= List of proclamations by Joe Biden (2022) =

The president of the United States may take any of several kinds of executive actions.

Executive orders are issued to help officers and agencies of the executive branch manage the operations within the federal government itself. Presidential memoranda are closely related, and have the force of law on the Executive Branch, but are generally considered less prestigious. Presidential memoranda do not have an established process for issuance, and unlike executive orders, they are not numbered. A presidential determination results in an official policy or position of the executive branch of the United States government. A presidential proclamation is a statement issued by a president on a matter of public policy, under specific authority granted to the president by Congress, typically on a matter of widespread interest. Administrative orders are signed documents such as notices, letters, and orders, that can be issued to conduct administrative operations of the federal government. A presidential notice or a presidential sequestration order can also be issued. National security directives (Note: National Security and Homeland Security Presidential Directives address continuity of government in the event of a "catastrophic emergency" disrupting the U.S. population, economy, environment, infrastructure and government policy.) operate like executive orders, but are only in the area of national security. They have been issued by different presidents under various names.

Listed below are the presidential proclamations signed by United States President Joe Biden, beginning with Proclamation 10140. President Biden has signed 745 presidential proclamations.

== Presidential proclamations ==
View source data.
Cumulative number of proclamations signed by Joe Biden

=== 2022 ===
Relative no.	Absolute no.	Title / description	Date signed	Date published	FR citation	FR doc. number	Ref.
195	10334	Religious Freedom Day, 2022	January 14, 2022	January 20, 2022	87 FR 3021	2022-01162	
196	10335	Martin Luther King Jr. Federal Holiday, 2022	January 14, 2022	January 20, 2022	87 FR 3023	2022-01163	
197	10336	American Heart Month, 2022	January 31, 2022	February 3, 2022	87 FR 6395	2022-02447	
198	10337	National Black History Month, 2022	January 31, 2022	February 3, 2022	87 FR 6397	2022-02456	
199	10338	National Teen Dating Violence Awareness and Prevention Month, 2022	January 31, 2022	February 3, 2022	87 FR 6401	2022-02458	
200	10339	To Continue Facilitating Positive Adjustment to Competition From Imports of Certain Crystalline Silicon Photovoltaic Cells (Whether or Not Partially or Fully Assembled Into Other Products)	February 4, 2022	February 9, 2022	87 FR 7357	2022-02906	
201	10340	National Eating Disorders Awareness Week, 2022	February 18, 2022	February 24, 2022	87 FR 10675	2022-04096	
202	10341	Day of Remembrance of Japanese American Incarceration During World War II	February 18, 2022	February 24, 2022	87 FR 10677	2022-04103	
203	10342	American Red Cross Month, 2022	February 28, 2022	March 3, 2022	87 FR 11923	2022-04610	
204	10343	Irish-American Heritage Month, 2022	February 28, 2022	March 3, 2022	87 FR 11925	2022-04611	
205	10344	National Colorectal Cancer Awareness Month, 2022	February 28, 2022	March 3, 2022	87 FR 11927	2022-04613	
206	10345	Women's History Month, 2022	February 28, 2022	March 3, 2022	87 FR 11929	2022-04614	
207	10346	Read Across America Day, 2022	March 1, 2022	March 4, 2022	87 FR 12389	2022-04776	
208	10347	National Consumer Protection Week, 2022	March 4, 2022	March 9, 2022	87 FR 13115	2022-05109	
209	10348	National Equal Pay Day, 2022	March 14, 2022	March 17, 2022	87 FR 15029	2022-05797	
210	10349	National Poison Prevention Week, 2022	March 18, 2022	March 23, 2022	87 FR 16369	2022-06248	
211	10350	National Agriculture Day, 2022	March 21, 2022	March 24, 2022	87 FR 16981	2022-06393	
212	10351	Death of Madeleine Korbel Albright	March 23, 2022	March 28, 2022	87 FR 17141	2022-06614	
213	10352	Greek Independence Day: A National Day of Celebration of Greek and American Democracy, 2022	March 24, 2022	March 29, 2022	87 FR 17937	2022-06727	
214	10353	Commemoration of the 50th Anniversary of the Vietnam War	March 28, 2022	March 31, 2022	87 FR 18601	2022-06933	
215	10354	César Chávez Day, 2022	March 30, 2022	April 1, 2022	87 FR 19347	2022-07134	
216	10355	Transgender Day of Visibility, 2022	March 30, 2022	April 1, 2022	87 FR 19349	2022-07135	
217	10356	Adjusting Imports of Steel Into the United States	March 31, 2022	April 1, 2022	87 FR 19351	2022-07136	
218	10357	Month of the Military Child, 2022	March 31, 2022	April 5, 2022	87 FR 19581	2022-07261	
219	10358	National Cancer Control Month, 2022	March 31, 2022	April 5, 2022	87 FR 19583	2022-07267	
220	10359	National Child Abuse Prevention Month, 2022	March 31, 2022	April 5, 2022	87 FR 19585	2022-07273	
221	10360	National Donate Life Month, 2022	March 31, 2022	April 5, 2022	87 FR 19587	2022-07274	
222	10361	National Sexual Assault Awareness And Prevention Month, 2022	March 31, 2022	April 5, 2022	87 FR 19589	2022-07275	
223	10362	Second Chance Month, 2022	March 31, 2022	April 5, 2022	87 FR 19593	2022-07276	
224	10363	National Public Health Week, 2022	April 1, 2022	April 6, 2022	87 FR 19779	2022-07444	
225	10364	World Autism Awareness Day, 2022	April 1, 2022	April 6, 2022	87 FR 19781	2022-07447	
226	10365	Black Maternal Health Week, 2022	April 8, 2022	April 13, 2022	87 FR 22095	2022-08074	
227	10366	Pan American Day and Pan American Week, 2022	April 8, 2022	April 13, 2022	87 FR 22097	2022-08079	
228	10367	National Former Prisoner of War Recognition Day, 2022	April 8, 2022	April 13, 2022	87 FR 22099	2022-08080	
229	10368	Education and Sharing Day, USA, 2022	April 11, 2022	April 14, 2022	87 FR 22101	2022-08131	
230	10369	National Park Week, 2022	April 15, 2022	April 20, 2022	87 FR 23747	2022-08613	
231	10370	National Volunteer Week, 2022	April 15, 2022	April 20, 2022	87 FR 23749	2022-08614	
232	10371	Declaration of National Emergency and Invocation of Emergency Authority Relating to the Regulation of the Anchorage and Movement of Russian-Affiliated Vessels to United States Ports	April 21, 2022	April 22, 2022	87 FR 24265	2022-08872	
233	10372	Earth Day, 2022	April 21, 2022	April 26, 2022	87 FR 24397	2022-09012	
234	10373	Days of Remembrance of Victims of the Holocaust, 2022	April 22, 2022	April 27, 2022	87 FR 24847	2022-09132	
235	10374	National Crime Victims’ Rights Week, 2022	April 22, 2022	April 27, 2022	87 FR 24849	2022-09137	
236	10375	Workers Memorial Day, 2022	April 27, 2022	May 2, 2022	87 FR 25569	2022-09484	
237	10376	Law Day, U.S.A., 2022	April 28, 2022	May 3, 2022	87 FR 26121	2022-09555	
238	10377	Asian American, Native Hawaiian, and Pacific Islander Heritage Month, 2022	April 29, 2022	May 5, 2022	87 FR 26653	2022-09756	
239	10378	National Building Safety Month, 2022	April 29, 2022	May 5, 2022	87 FR 26655	2022-09758	
240	10379	National Foster Care Month, 2022	April 29, 2022	May 5, 2022	87 FR 26657	2022-09759	
241	10380	National Mental Health Awareness Month, 2022	April 29, 2022	May 5, 2022	87 FR 26659	2022-09760	
242	10381	National Physical Fitness and Sports Month, 2022	April 29, 2022	May 5, 2022	87 FR 26661	2022-09761	
243	10382	Older Americans Month, 2022	April 29, 2022	May 5, 2022	87 FR 26663	2022-09762	
244	10383	National Hurricane Preparedness Week, 2022	April 29, 2022	May 5, 2022	87 FR 26665	2022-09763	
245	10384	National Small Business Week, 2022	April 29, 2022	May 5, 2022	87 FR 26667	2022-09764	
246	10385	National Teacher Appreciation Day and National Teacher Appreciation Week, 2022	April 29, 2022	May 5, 2022	87 FR 26669	2022-09765	
247	10386	Public Service Recognition Week, 2022	April 29, 2022	May 5, 2022	87 FR 26671	2022-09766	
248	10387	Loyalty Day, 2022	April 29, 2022	May 5, 2022	87 FR 26673	2022-09769	
249	10388	Jewish American Heritage Month, 2022	April 29, 2022	May 5, 2022	87 FR 26959	2022-09869	
250	10389	Missing or Murdered Indigenous Persons Awareness Day, 2022	May 4, 2022	May 9, 2022	87 FR 27905	2022-10073	
251	10390	National Day of Prayer, 2022	May 4, 2022	May 9, 2022	87 FR 27907	2022-10075	
252	10391	Military Spouse Appreciation Day, 2022	May 5, 2022	May 9, 2022	87 FR 27915	2022-10097	
253	10392	National Women's Health Week, 2022	May 6, 2022	May 11, 2022	87 FR 28751	2022-10191	
254	10393	Mother's Day, 2022	May 6, 2022	May 11, 2022	87 FR 28753	2022-10192	
255	10394	Remembering the 1,000,000 Americans Lost to COVID-19	May 12, 2022	May 17, 2022	87 FR 30095	2022-10750	
256	10395	Emergency Medical Services Week, 2022	May 13, 2022	May 19, 2022	87 FR 30385	2022-10879	
257	10396	National Defense Transportation Day and National Transportation Week, 2022	May 13, 2022	May 19, 2022	87 FR 30387	2022-10882	
258	10397	Peace Officers Memorial Day and Police Week, 2022	May 13, 2022	May 19, 2022	87 FR 30389	2022-10883	
259	10398	World Trade Week, 2022	May 13, 2022	May 19, 2022	87 FR 30391	2022-10884	
260	10399	National Safe Boating Week, 2022	May 20, 2022	May 24, 2022	87 FR 31699	2022-11321	
261	10400	Armed Forces Day, 2022	May 20, 2022	May 24, 2022	87 FR 31701	2022-11322	
262	10401	National Maritime Day, 2022	May 20, 2022	May 24, 2022	87 FR 31705	2022-11325	
263	10402	Honoring the Victims of the Tragedy in Uvalde, Texas	May 24, 2022	May 27, 2022	87 FR 32077	2022-11601	
264	10403	Adjusting Imports of Steel Into the United States	May 27, 2022	June 2, 2022	87 FR 33407	2022-11991	
265	10404	Prayer for Peace, Memorial Day, 2022	May 27, 2022	June 2, 2022	87 FR 33413	2022-11992	
266	10405	Adjusting Imports of Aluminum Into the United States	May 31, 2022	June 3, 2022	87 FR 33583	2022-12097	
267	10406	Adjusting Imports of Steel Into the United States	May 31, 2022	June 3, 2022	87 FR 33591	2022-12108	
268	10407	Black Music Appreciation Month, 2022	May 31, 2022	June 3, 2022	87 FR 33601	2022-12123	
269	10408	Great Outdoors Month, 2022	May 31, 2022	June 3, 2022	87 FR 33603	2022-12124	
270	10409	Lesbian, Gay, Bisexual, Transgender, Queer, and Intersex Pride Month, 2022	May 31, 2022	June 3, 2022	87 FR 33605	2022-12125	
271	10410	National Caribbean-American Heritage Month, 2022	May 31, 2022	June 3, 2022	87 FR 33607	2022-12126	
272	10411	National Homeownership Month, 2022	May 31, 2022	June 3, 2022	87 FR 33609	2022-12127	
273	10412	National Immigrant Heritage Month, 2022	May 31, 2022	June 3, 2022	87 FR 33611	2022-12128	
274	10413	National Ocean Month, 2022	May 31, 2022	June 3, 2022	87 FR 33613	2022-12129	
275	10414	Declaration of Emergency and Authorization for Temporary Extensions of Time and Duty-Free Importation of Solar Cells and Modules From Southeast Asia	June 6, 2022	June 9, 2022	87 FR 35067	2022-12578	
276	10415	Flag Day and National Flag Week, 2022	June 10, 2022	June 15, 2022	87 FR 36045	2022-12985	
277	10416	World Elder Abuse Awareness Day, 2022	June 14, 2022	June 17, 2022	87 FR 36381	2022-13215	
278	10417	Father's Day, 2022	June 17, 2022	June 23, 2022	87 FR 37435	2022-13545	
279	10418	Juneteenth Day of Observance, 2022	June 17, 2022	June 23, 2022	87 FR 37437	2022-13546	
280	10419	50th Anniversary of the Federal Pell Grant Program	June 22, 2022	June 27, 2022	87 FR 37977	2022-13785	
281	10420	Increasing Duties on Certain Articles From the Russian Federation	June 27, 2022	June 30, 2022	87 FR 38875	2022-14145	
282	10421	Honoring the Victims of the Tragedy in Highland Park, Illinois	July 5, 2022	July 8, 2022	87 FR 40707	2022-14709	
283	10422	Death of Abe Shinzo	July 8, 2022	July 13, 2022	87 FR 42051	2022-15135	
284	10423	Captive Nations Week, 2022	July 15, 2022	July 20, 2022	87 FR 43199	2022-15590	
285	10424	National Atomic Veterans Day, 2022	July 15, 2022	July 20, 2022	87 FR 43201	2022-15593	
286	10425	Made in America Week, 2022	July 22, 2022	July 27, 2022	87 FR 45003	2022-16196	
287	10426	Anniversary of the Americans With Disabilities Act, 2022	July 25, 2022	July 28, 2022	87 FR 45233	2022-16333	
288	10427	National Korean War Veterans Armistice Day, 2022	July 26, 2022	July 29, 2022	87 FR 45623	2022-16446	
289	10428	National Health Center Week, 2022	August 5, 2022	August 10, 2022	87 FR 48601	2022-17297	
290	10429	National Employer Support of the Guard and Reserve Week, 2022	August 19, 2022	August 24, 2022	87 FR 51859	2022-18357	
291	10430	Women's Equality Day, 2022	August 25, 2022	August 30, 2022	87 FR 52845	2022-18835	
292	10431	Overdose Awareness Week, 2022	August 26, 2022	August 31, 2022	87 FR 53361	2022-18933	
293	10432	National Childhood Cancer Awareness Month, 2022	August 31, 2022	September 6, 2022	87 FR 54297	2022-19275	
294	10433	National Ovarian Cancer Awareness Month, 2022	August 31, 2022	September 6, 2022	87 FR 54299	2022-19282	
295	10434	National Preparedness Month, 2022	August 31, 2022	September 6, 2022	87 FR 54301	2022-19296	
296	10435	National Prostate Cancer Awareness Month, 2022	August 31, 2022	September 6, 2022	87 FR 54303	2022-19300	
297	10436	National Recovery Month, 2022	August 31, 2022	September 6, 2022	87 FR 54305	2022-19301	
298	10437	National Sickle Cell Awareness Month, 2022	August 31, 2022	September 6, 2022	87 FR 54307	2022-19302	
299	10438	National Wilderness Month, 2022	August 31, 2022	September 6, 2022	87 FR 54309	2022-19303	
300	10439	Labor Day, 2022	September 2, 2022	September 8, 2022	87 FR 54857	2022-19531	
301	10440	Death of Queen Elizabeth II	September 8, 2022	September 13, 2022	87 FR 55901	2022-19875	
302	10441	National Days of Prayer and Remembrance, 2022	September 8, 2022	September 13, 2022	87 FR 55903	2022-19876	
303	10442	World Suicide Prevention Day, 2022	September 9, 2022	September 14, 2022	87 FR 56239	2022-20003	
304	10443	National Hispanic-Serving Institutions Week, 2022	September 9, 2022	September 14, 2022	87 FR 56241	2022-20004	
305	10444	National Grandparents Day, 2022	September 9, 2022	September 14, 2022	87 FR 56243	2022-20005	
306	10445	Patriot Day and National Day of Service and Remembrance, 2022	September 9, 2022	September 14, 2022	87 FR 56245	2022-20006	
307	10446	National Hispanic Heritage Month, 2022	September 14, 2022	September 19, 2022	87 FR 57137	2022-20325	
308	10447	National POW/MIA Recognition Day, 2022	September 15, 2022	September 20, 2022	87 FR 57367	2022-20449	
309	10448	Constitution Day and Citizenship Day, and Constitution Week, 2022	September 16, 2022	September 21, 2022	87 FR 57561	2022-20578	
310	10449	Minority Enterprise Development Week, 2022	September 16, 2022	September 21, 2022	87 FR 57563	2022-20579	
311	10450	National Farm Safety and Health Week, 2022	September 16, 2022	September 21, 2022	87 FR 57565	2022-20580	
312	10451	National Historically Black Colleges and Universities Week, 2022	September 16, 2022	September 21, 2022	87 FR 57567	2022-20581	
313	10452	National Voter Registration Day, 2022	September 19, 2022	September 22, 2022	87 FR 57793	2022-20695	
314	10453	National Hunting and Fishing Day, 2022	September 23, 2022	September 28, 2022	87 FR 58705	2022-21139	
315	10454	National Public Lands Day, 2022	September 23, 2022	September 28, 2022	87 FR 58707	2022-21140	
316	10455	Gold Star Mother's and Family's Day, 2022	September 23, 2022	September 28, 2022	87 FR 58709	2022-21141	
317	10456	Cybersecurity Awareness Month, 2022	September 30, 2022	October 5, 2022	87 FR 60241	2022-21767	
318	10457	National Arts and Humanities Month, 2022	September 30, 2022	October 5, 2022	87 FR 60243	2022-21768	
319	10458	National Breast Cancer Awareness Month, 2022	September 30, 2022	October 5, 2022	87 FR 60245	2022-21770	
320	10459	National Clean Energy Action Month, 2022	September 30, 2022	October 5, 2022	87 FR 60249	2022-21773	
321	10460	National Disability Employment Awareness Month, 2022	September 30, 2022	October 5, 2022	87 FR 60251	2022-21774	
322	10461	National Domestic Violence Awareness and Prevention Month, 2022	September 30, 2022	October 5, 2022	87 FR 60253	2022-21786	
323	10462	National Youth Justice Action Month, 2022	September 30, 2022	October 5, 2022	87 FR 60257	2022-21787	
324	10463	National Youth Substance Use Prevention Month, 2022	September 30, 2022	October 5, 2022	87 FR 60259	2022-21788	
325	10464	National Community Policing Week, 2022	September 30, 2022	October 5, 2022	87 FR 60261	2022-21789	
326	10465	Child Health Day, 2022	September 30, 2022	October 5, 2022	87 FR 60263	2022-21790	
327	10466	German-American Day, 2022	October 5, 2022	October 7, 2022	87 FR 61215	2022-22128	
328	10467	Granting Pardon for the Offense of Simple Possession of Marijuana	October 6, 2022	October 12, 2022	87 FR 61441	2022-22262	
329	10468	National Manufacturing Day, 2022	October 6, 2022	October 12, 2022	87 FR 61443	2022-22263	
330	10469	Fire Prevention Week, 2022	October 7, 2022	October 13, 2022	87 FR 61949	2022-22405	
331	10470	National School Lunch Week, 2022	October 7, 2022	October 13, 2022	87 FR 61951	2022-22406	
332	10471	Leif Erikson Day, 2022	October 7, 2022	October 13, 2022	87 FR 61953	2022-22407	
333	10472	Columbus Day, 2022	October 7, 2022	October 13, 2022	87 FR 61955	2022-22408	
334	10473	Indigenous Peoples' Day, 2022	October 7, 2022	October 13, 2022	87 FR 61957	2022-22410	
335	10474	General Pulaski Memorial Day, 2022	October 11, 2022	October 14, 2022	87 FR 62299	2022-22533	
336	10475	International Day of the Girl, 2022	October 11, 2022	October 14, 2022	87 FR 62301	2022-22534	
337	10476	Establishment of the Camp Hale-Continental Divide National Monument	October 12, 2022	October 19, 2022	87 FR 63381	2022-22810	
338	10477	Blind Americans Equality Day, 2022	October 14, 2022	October 19, 2022	87 FR 63393	2022-22828	
339	10478	National Character Counts Week, 2022	October 14, 2022	October 19, 2022	87 FR 63395	2022-22829	
340	10479	National Forest Products Week, 2022	October 14, 2022	October 19, 2022	87 FR 63397	2022-22830	
341	10480	50th Anniversary of the Clean Water Act	October 17, 2022	October 20, 2022	87 FR 63661	2022-22935	
342	10481	United Nations Day, 2022	October 21, 2022	October 26, 2022	87 FR 64683	2022-23432	
343	10482	National First Responders Day, 2022	October 27, 2022	November 1, 2022	87 FR 65649	2022-23853	
344	10483	Critical Infrastructure Security and Resilience Month, 2022	October 31, 2022	November 3, 2022	87 FR 66515	2022-24148	
345	10484	National Adoption Month, 2022	October 31, 2022	November 3, 2022	87 FR 66517	2022-24160	
346	10485	National Alzheimer's Disease Awareness Month, 2022	October 31, 2022	November 3, 2022	87 FR 66519	2022-24161	
347	10486	National Diabetes Month, 2022	October 31, 2022	November 3, 2022	87 FR 66521	2022-24162	
348	10487	National Entrepreneurship Month, 2022	October 31, 2022	November 3, 2022	87 FR 66525	2022-24165	
349	10488	National Family Caregivers Month, 2022	October 31, 2022	November 3, 2022	87 FR 66527	2022-24166	
350	10489	National Lung Cancer Awareness Month, 2022	October 31, 2022	November 3, 2022	87 FR 66529	2022-24169	
351	10490	National Native American Heritage Month, 2022	October 31, 2022	November 3, 2022	87 FR 66531	2022-24170	
352	10491	National Veterans and Military Families Month, 2022	October 31, 2022	November 3, 2022	87 FR 66533	2022-24171	
353	10492	Veterans Day, 2022	November 7, 2022	November 10, 2022	87 FR 67763	2022-24735	
354	10493	World Freedom Day, 2022	November 8, 2022	November 14, 2022	87 FR 68019	2022-24844	
355	10494	American Education Week, 2022	November 10, 2022	November 16, 2022	87 FR 68591	2022-25051	
356	10495	National Apprenticeship Week, 2022	November 10, 2022	November 16, 2022	87 FR 68593	2022-25052	
357	10496	America Recycles Day, 2022	November 14, 2022	November 17, 2022	87 FR 68885	2022-25195	
358	10497	National Rural Health Day, 2022	November 16, 2022	November 21, 2022	87 FR 70701	2022-25451	
359	10498	National Family Week, 2022	November 18, 2022	November 23, 2022	87 FR 71503	2022-25737	
360	10499	National Child's Day, 2022	November 18, 2022	November 23, 2022	87 FR 71505	2022-25740	
361	10500	Thanksgiving Day, 2022	November 23, 2022	November 30, 2022	87 FR 73431	2022-26158	
362	10501	National Impaired Driving Prevention Month, 2022	November 30, 2022	December 6, 2022	87 FR 74489	2022-26605	
363	10502	World AIDS Day, 2022	November 30, 2022	December 6, 2022	87 FR 74491	2022-26606	
364	10503	International Day of Persons With Disabilities, 2022	December 2, 2022	December 7, 2022	87 FR 74949	2022-26713	
365	10504	National Pearl Harbor Remembrance Day, 2022	December 6, 2022	December 9, 2022	87 FR 75455	2022-26934	
366	10505	Human Rights Day and Human Rights Week, 2022	December 9, 2022	December 14, 2022	87 FR 76403	2022-27248	
367	10506	Day of Remembrance: 10 Years After the 2012 Sandy Hook Elementary School Shooting	December 14, 2022	December 19, 2022	87 FR 77463	2022-27597	
368	10507	Bill of Rights Day, 2022	December 14, 2022	December 19, 2022	87 FR 77465	2022-27598	
369	10508	Wright Brothers Day, 2022	December 16, 2022	December 21, 2022	87 FR 78511	2022-27934	
370	10509	To Take Certain Actions Under the African Growth and Opportunity Act and for Other Purposes	December 23, 2022	December 29, 2022	87 FR 79977	2022-28473	
371	10510	National Human Trafficking Prevention Month, 2023	December 30, 2022	January 5, 2023	88 FR 739	2023-00092	
372	10511	National Mentoring Month, 2023	December 30, 2022	January 5, 2023	88 FR 741	2023-00093	
373	10512	National Stalking Awareness Month, 2023	December 30, 2022	January 5, 2023	88 FR 743	2023-00094	
