= List of presidential proclamations by George W. Bush =

This is a list of presidential proclamations by George W. Bush, the president of the United States from 2001 to 2009, which is a subset of the longer list of executive actions by George W. Bush.

== Presidential proclamations ==
=== 2001 ===
Rel #	Abs #	Title/Description	Date signed	Date published	FR Citation	FR Doc #	United States Code	Ref.
1	7403	National Day of Prayer and Thanksgiving, 2001	Jan 20, 2001	Jan 25, 2001	66 FR 7859	01-2400	36 U.S.C. § 119	
2	7404	National African American History Month, 2001	Feb 1, 2001	Feb 5, 2001	66 FR 9023	01-3163	—N/a	
3	7405	National Consumer Protection Week, 2001	Feb 5, 2001	Feb 8, 2001	66 FR 9637	01-3475	—N/a	
4	7406	American Heart Month, 2001	Feb 7, 2001	Feb 9, 2001	66 FR 9757	01-3588	36 U.S.C. § 101	
5	7407	National Burn Awareness Week, 2001	Feb 7, 2001	Feb 9, 2001	66 FR 9761	01-3589	—N/a	
6	7408	American Red Cross Month, 2001	Feb 26, 2001	Mar 1, 2001	66 FR 12987	01-5189	—N/a	
7	7409	Irish-American Heritage Month, 2001	Feb 26, 2001	Mar 1, 2001	66 FR 12991	01-5190	—N/a	
8	7410	Fortieth Anniversary of the Peace Corps	Feb 28, 2001	Mar 6, 2001	66 FR 13637	01-5669	—N/a	
9	7411	Women's History Month, 2001	Mar 1, 2001	Mar 6, 2001	66 FR 13641	01-5670	—N/a	
10	7412	National Poison Prevention Week, 2001	Mar 2, 2001	Mar 6, 2001	66 FR 13643	01-5671	36 U.S.C. § 130	
11	7413	Save Your Vision Week, 2001	Mar 5, 2001	Mar 8, 2001	66 FR 14065	01-6043	36 U.S.C. § 138	
12	7414	Greek Independence Day: A National Day of Celebration of Greek and American Democracy, 2001	Mar 5, 2001	Mar 8, 2001	66 FR 14069	01-6044	—N/a	
13	7453	National Colorectal Cancer Awareness Month, 2001	Mar 8, 2001	Mar 12, 2001	66 FR 14475	01-6309	—N/a	
14	7416	National Girl Scout Week, 2001	Mar 16, 2001	Mar 20, 2001	66 FR 15781	01-7091	—N/a	
15	7417	Education and Sharing Day, U.S.A., 2001	Mar 22, 2001	Mar 26, 2001	66 FR 16589	01-7616	—N/a	
16	7418	Cancer Control Month, 2001	Mar 28, 2001	Mar 29, 2001	66 FR 17315	01-8009	36 U.S.C. § 103	
17	7419	National Child Abuse Prevention Month, 2001	Mar 28, 2001	Mar 29, 2001	66 FR 17319	01-8010	—N/a	
18	7420	Pan American Day and Pan American Week, 2001	Apr 2, 2001	Apr 5, 2001	66 FR 18035	01-8506	36 U.S.C. § 134	
19	7421	National Former Prisoner of War Recognition Day, 2001	Apr 2, 2001	Apr 5, 2001	66 FR 18181	01-8581	—N/a	
20	7422	National Organ and Tissue Donor Awareness Week, 2001	Apr 4, 2001	Apr 9, 2001	66 FR 18395	01-8834	—N/a	
21	7423	Jewish Heritage Week, 2001	Apr 9, 2001	Apr 11, 2001	66 FR 18865	01-9151	—N/a	
22	7424	National Crime Victims' Rights Week, 2001	Apr 9, 2001	Apr 12, 2001	66 FR 19075	01-9343	—N/a	
23	7425	National D.A.R.E. Day, 2001	Apr 10, 2001	Apr 12, 2001	66 FR 19079	01-9344	—N/a	
24	7426	Thomas Jefferson Day, 2001	Apr 12, 2001	Apr 17, 2001	66 FR 19843	01-9675	36 U.S.C. § 141	
25	7427	National Volunteer Week, 2001	Apr 16, 2001	Apr 19, 2001	66 FR 20081	01-9871	—N/a	
26	7428	National Park Week, 2001	Apr 17, 2001	Apr 20, 2001	66 FR 20183	01-9988	—N/a	
27	7429	Loyalty Day, 2001	Apr 25, 2001	Apr 30, 2001	66 FR 21627	01-10935	36 U.S.C. § 115	
28	7430	National Day of Prayer, 2001	Apr 27, 2001	May 2, 2001	66 FR 22101	01-11209	—N/a	
29	7431	Law Day, U.S.A., 2001	Apr 30, 2001	May 3, 2001	66 FR 22421	01-11359	36 U.S.C. § 113	
30	7432	Older Americans Month, 2001	May 4, 2001	May 9, 2001	66 FR 23533	01-11849	—N/a	
31	7433	Small Business Week, 2001	May 4, 2001	May 9, 2001	66 FR 23535	01-11850	—N/a	
32	7434	Asian/Pacific American Heritage Month, 2001	May 7, 2001	May 10, 2001	66 FR 23831	01-11913	36 U.S.C. § 102	
33	7435	Peace Officers Memorial Day and Police Week, 2001	May 8, 2001	May 11, 2001	66 FR 24043	01-12078	36 U.S.C. § 136; 36 U.S.C. § 137	
34	7436	National Salvation Army Week, 2001	May 8, 2001	May 11, 2001	66 FR 24045	01-12079	—N/a	
35	7437	Mother's Day, 2001	May 9, 2001	May 11, 2001	66 FR 24046	01-12080	36 U.S.C. § 117	
36	7438	National Biotechnology Week, 2001	May 16, 2001	May 21, 2001	66 FR 28043	01-12966	—N/a	
37	7439	National Defense Transportation Day, 2001	May 16, 2001	May 21, 2001	66 FR 28047	01-12967	36 U.S.C. § 120	
38	7440	National Safe Boating Week, 2001	May 17, 2001	May 22, 2001	66 FR 28049	01-13056	36 U.S.C. § 131	
39	7441	World Trade Week, 2001	May 18, 2001	May 22, 2001	66 FR 28351	01-13115	—N/a	
40	7442	National Maritime Day, 2001	May 18, 2001	May 24, 2001	66 FR 28639	01-13296	36 U.S.C. § 128	
41	7443	National Hurricane Awareness Week, 2001	May 22, 2001	May 24, 2001	66 FR 28823	01-13367	—N/a	
42	7444	Prayer for Peace, Memorial Day, 2001	May 25, 2001	May 31, 2001	66 FR 29445	01-13788	36 U.S.C. § 116	
43	7445	To Provide for the Efficient and Fair Administration of Action Taken With Regard to Imports of Lamb Meat and for Other Purposes	May 30, 2001	Jun 4, 2001	66 FR 30051	01-14193	—N/a	
44	7446	National Child's Day, 2001	Jun 2, 2001	Jun 6, 2001	66 FR 30287	01-14407	—N/a	
45	7447	Flag Day and National Flag Week, 2001	Jun 6, 2001	Jun 11, 2001	66 FR 31365	01-14854	36 U.S.C. § 110; 36 U.S.C. § 122	
46	7448	Asiatic Fleet Memorial Day, 2001	Jun 7, 2001	Jun 11, 2001	66 FR 31369	01-14861	—N/a	
47	7449	To Implement the Agreement Between the United States of America and the Socialist Republic of Vietnam on Trade Relations	Jun 8, 2001	Jun 12, 2001	66 FR 31375	01-14938	—N/a	
48	7450	Great Outdoors Week, 2001	Jun 11, 2001	Jun 13, 2001	66 FR 32203	01-15117	—N/a	
49	7451	Father's Day, 2001	Jun 15, 2001	Jun 19, 2001	66 FR 32891	01-15571	36 U.S.C. § 109	
50	7452	Suspension of Entry as Immigrants and Nonimmigrants of Persons Responsible for Actions That Threaten International Stabilization Efforts in the Western Balkans, and Persons Responsible for Wartime Atrocities in That Region	Jun 26, 2001	Jun 29, 2001	66 FR 34773	01-16667	—N/a	
51	7453	Black Music Month, 2001	Jun 29, 2001	Jul 3, 2001	66 FR 35359	01-16911	—N/a	
52	7454	To Modify Duty-Free Treatment Under the Generalized, 2001	Jun 29, 2001	Jul 5, 2001	66 FR 35365	01-16951	—N/a	
53	7455	Captive Nations Week, 2001	Jul 12, 2001	Jul 17, 2001	66 FR 37103	01-17966	—N/a	
54	7456	Parents' Day 2001	Jul 21, 2001	Jul 25, 2001	66 FR 38887	01-18734	36 U.S.C. § 135	
55	7457	National Korean War Veterans Armistice Day, 2001	Jul 25, 2001	Jul 30, 2001	66 FR 39401	01-19112	36 U.S.C. § 127	
56	7458	Women's Equality Day, 2001	Aug 24, 2001	Aug 29, 2001	66 FR 45563	01-21962	—N/a	
57	7459	National Ovarian Cancer Awareness Month, 2001	Aug 30, 2001	Sep 5, 2001	66 FR 46505	01-22474	—N/a	
58	7460	National Birmingham Pledge Week, 2001	Sep 8, 2001	Sep 12, 2001	66 FR 47567	01-23078	—N/a	
59	7461	Honoring the Victims of the Incidents on Tuesday, Sep 11, 2001	Sep 11, 2001	Sep 14, 2001	66 FR 47937	01-23193	—N/a	
60	7462	National Day of Prayer and Remembrance for the Victims of the Terrorist Attacks on Sep 11, 2001	Sep 13, 2001	Sep 14, 2001	66 FR 47945	01-23257	—N/a	
61	7463	Declaration of National Emergency by Reason of Certain Terrorist Attacks	Sep 14, 2001	Sep 18, 2001	66 FR 48197	01-23358	—N/a	
62	7464	Amendment to Proclamation 74461, Display of the Flag at Half-Staff as a Mark of Respect for the Victims of the Incidents on Tuesday, Sep 11, 2001	Sep 14, 2001	Sep 19, 2001	66 FR 48203	01-23473	—N/a	
63	7465	National Farm and Ranch Safety and Health Week, 2001	Sep 17, 2001	Sep 19, 2001	66 FR 48315	01-23620	—N/a	
64	7466	Citizenship Day and Constitution Week, 2001	Sep 17, 2001	Sep 19, 2001	66 FR 48319	01-23621	36 U.S.C. § 106; 36 U.S.C. § 108	
65	7467	Minority Enterprise Development Week, 2001	Sep 17, 2001	Sep 19, 2001	66 FR 48321	01-23622	—N/a	
66	7468	To Modify Duty-Free Treatment Under the Generalized System of Preferences, 2001	Sep 19, 2001	Sep 24, 2001	66 FR 48945	01-23984	—N/a	
67	7469	National POW/MIA Recognition Day, 2001	Sep 21, 2001	Sep 25, 2001	66 FR 48949	01-24106	—N/a	
68	7470	Family Day, 2001	Sep 24, 2001	Sep 27, 2001	66 FR 49503	01-24453	—N/a	
69	7471	National Historically Black Colleges and Universities Week, 2001	Sep 28, 2001	Oct 2, 2001	66 FR 50099	01-24772	—N/a	
70	7472	National Hispanic Heritage Month, 2001	Sep 28, 2001	Oct 2, 2001	66 FR 50097	01-24771	36 U.S.C. § 126	
71	7473	National Public Lands Day, 2001	Sep 28, 2001	Oct 3, 2001	66 FR 50287	01-24915	—N/a	
72	7474	Gold Star Mother's Day, 2001	Sep 28, 2001	Oct 3, 2001	66 FR 50289	01-24916	36 U.S.C. § 111	
73	7475	National Domestic Violence Awareness Month, 2001	Oct 1, 2001	Oct 4, 2001	66 FR 50525	01-25040	—N/a	
74	7476	Child Health Day, 2001	Oct 1, 2001	Oct 4, 2001	66 FR 50527	01-25041	36 U.S.C. § 105	
75	7477	National Breast Cancer Awareness Month, 2001	Oct 3, 2001	Oct 9, 2001	66 FR 51295	01-25439	—N/a	
76	7478	National Disability Employment Awareness Month, 2001	Oct 3, 2001	Oct 9, 2001	66 FR 51297	01-25440	36 U.S.C. § 121	
77	7479	Death of Michael J. Mansfield	Oct 5, 2001	Oct 10, 2001	66 FR 51805	01-25674	—N/a	
78	7480	Fire Prevention Week, 2001	Oct 5, 2001	Oct 10, 2001	66 FR 51808	01-25675	—N/a	
79	7481	German-American Day, 2001	Oct 5, 2001	Oct 10, 2001	66 FR 51810	01-25676	—N/a	
80	74482	Columbus Day, 2001	Oct 8, 2001	Oct 11, 2001	66 FR 52009	01-25787	36 U.S.C. § 107	
81	7483	Leif Erikson Day, 2001	Oct 9, 2001	Oct 12, 2001	66 FR 52015	01-25884	36 U.S.C. § 114	
82	7484	General Pulaski Memorial Day, 2001	Oct 10, 2001	Oct 12, 2001	66 FR 52301	01-25940	—N/a	
83	7485	National School Lunch Week, 2001	Oct 15, 2001	Oct 17, 2001	66 FR 52845	01-26340	36 U.S.C. § 132	
84	7486	White Cane Safety Day, 2001	Oct 15, 2001	Oct 17, 2001	66 FR 52847	01-26341	36 U.S.C. § 142	
85	7487	National Forest Products Week, 2001	Oct 19, 2001	Oct 25, 2001	66 FR 53943	01-27060	—N/a	
86	7488	National Character Counts Week, 2001	Oct 22, 2001	Oct 30, 2001	66 FR 54901	01-27443	—N/a	
87	7489	United Nations Day, 2001	Oct 24, 2001	Oct 30, 2001	66 FR 54907	01-27445	—N/a	
88	7490	National Red Ribbon Week for a Drug-Free America, 2001	Oct 24, 2001	Oct 30, 2001	66 FR 54905	01-27444	—N/a	
89	7491	Veterans Day, 2001	Oct 30, 2001	Nov 2, 2001	66 FR 55555	01-27717	36 U.S.C. § 145	
90	7492	National Prostate Cancer Awareness Month, 2001	Nov 1, 2001	Nov 6, 2001	66 FR 56031	01-27989	—N/a	
91	7493	National Adoption Month, 2001	Nov 5, 2001	Nov 8, 2001	66 FR 56425	01-28210	—N/a	
92	7494	National Employer Support of the Guard and Reserve Week, 2001	Nov 9, 2001	Nov 15, 2001	66 FR 57625	01-28799	—N/a	
93	7495	Chronic Obstructive Pulmonary Disease Month, 2001	Nov 9, 2001	Nov 15, 2001	66 FR 57629	01-28800	—N/a	
94	7496	National Alcohol and Drug Addiction Recovery Month, 2001	Nov 9, 2001	Nov 15, 2001	66 FR 57633	01-28801	—N/a	
95	7497	National Alzheimer's Disease Awareness Month, 2001	Nov 9, 2001	Nov 15, 2001	66 FR 57635	01-28802	—N/a	
96	7498	National Family Caregivers Month, 2001	Nov 9, 2001	Nov 15, 2001	66 FR 57637	01-28803	—N/a	
97	7499	World Freedom Day, 2001	Nov 9, 2001	Nov 15, 2001	66 FR 57639	01-28804	—N/a	
98	7500	National American Indian Heritage Month, 2001	Nov 12, 2001	Nov 15, 2001	66 FR 57641	01-28805	—N/a	
99	7501	National Farm-City Week, 2001	Nov 13, 2001	Nov 15, 2001	66 FR 57643	01-28806	—N/a	
100	7502	To Provide for the Termination of Action Taken With Regard to Imports of Lamb Meat	Nov 14, 2001	Nov 19, 2001	66 FR 57837	01-28993	—N/a	
101	7503	America Recycles Day, 2001	Nov 15, 2001	Nov 20, 2001	66 FR 58049	01-29158	—N/a	
102	7504	Thanksgiving Day, 2001	Nov 15, 2001	Nov 20, 2001	66 FR 58345	01-29234	—N/a	
103	7505	To Modify the Tariff-Rate Quota Applicable to Imports of Steel Wire Rod	Nov 21, 2001	Nov 28, 2001	66 FR 59353	01-29654	—N/a	
104	7506	National Family Week, 2001	Nov 21, 2001	Nov 29, 2001	66 FR 59529	01-29809	—N/a	
105	7507	National Diabetes Month, 2001	Nov 29, 2001	Dec 4, 2001	66 FR 62907	01-30145	—N/a	
106	7508	National Hospice Month, 2001	Nov 29, 2001	Dec 4, 2001	66 FR 62909	01-30146	—N/a	
107	7509	National Drunk and Drugged Driving Prevention Month, 2001	Nov 29, 2001	Dec 4, 2001	66 FR 62911	01-30147	—N/a	
108	7510	World Aids Day, 2001	Nov 30, 2001	Dec 5, 2001	66 FR 63149	01-30279	—N/a	
109	7511	National Pearl Harbor Remembrance Day, 2001	Dec 5, 2001	Dec 10, 2001	66 FR 63897	01-30660	36 U.S.C. § 129	
110	7512	To Implement the Agreement Between the United States of America and the Hashemite Kingdom of Jordan on the Establishment of a Free Trade Area	Dec 7, 2001	Dec 13, 2001	66 FR 64495	01-30785	—N/a	
111	7513	Human Rights Day, Bill of Rights Day, and Human Rights Week, 2001	Dec 9, 2001	Dec 12, 2001	66 FR 64095	01-30834	—N/a	
112	7514	Wright Brothers Day, 2001	Dec 13, 2001	Dec 17, 2001	66 FR 65087	01-31208	36 U.S.C. § 143	
113	7515	To Modify the Harmonized Tariff Schedule of the United States, To Provide Rules of Origin Under the North American Free Trade Agreement for Affected Goods, and for Other Purposes	Dec 18, 2001	Dec 26, 2001	66 FR 66547	01-31522	—N/a	
114	7516	To Extend Nondiscriminatory Treatment (Normal Trade Relations Treatment) to the Products of the People's Republic of China	Dec 27, 2001	Jan 4, 2002	67 FR 479	02-326	—N/a	

=== 2002 ===
Rel #	Abs #	Title/Description	Date signed	Date published	FR Citation	FR Doc #	United States Code	Ref.
115	7517	Religious Freedom Day, 2002	Jan 15, 2002	Jan 18, 2002	67 FR 2785	02-1593	—N/a	
116	7518	Martin Luther King, Jr., Federal Holiday, 2002	Jan 17, 2002	Jan 24, 2002	67 FR 3573	02-1969	—N/a	
117	7519	National Mentoring Month, 2002	Jan 18, 2002	Jan 24, 2002	67 FR 3577	02-1970	—N/a	
118	7520	National Sanctity of Human Life Day, 2002	Jan 18, 2002	Jan 24, 2002	67 FR 3579	02-1971	—N/a	
119	7521	American Heart Month, 2002	Feb 1, 2002	Feb 6, 2002	67 FR 5431	02-3000	36 U.S.C. § 101	
120	7522	National African American History Month, 2002	Feb 1, 2002	Feb 6, 2002	67 FR 5433	02-3001	—N/a	
121	7523	National Consumer Protection Week, 2002	Feb 4, 2002	Feb 7, 2002	67 FR 5919	02-3158	—N/a	
122	7524	Suspension of Entry as Immigrants and Nonimmigrants of Persons Responsible for Actions That Threaten Zimbabwe's Democratic Institutions and Transition to a Multi-Party Democracy	Feb 22, 2002	Feb 26, 2002	67 FR 8855	02-4744	—N/a	
123	7525	American Red Cross Month, 2002	Mar 2, 2002	Mar 6, 2002	67 FR 10309	02-5505	—N/a	
124	7526	Irish-American Heritage Month, 2002	Mar 2, 2002	Mar 6, 2002	67 FR 10313	02-5506	—N/a	
125	7527	National Colorectal Cancer Awareness Month, 2002	Mar 2, 2002	Mar 6, 2002	67 FR 10315	02-5507	—N/a	
126	7528	Save Your Vision Week, 2002	Mar 2, 2002	Mar 6, 2002	67 FR 10317	02-5508	36 U.S.C. § 138	
127	7529	To Facilitate Positive Adjustment to Competition From Imports of Certain Steel Products	Mar 5, 2002	Mar 7, 2002	67 FR 10551	02-5711	—N/a	
128	7530	Women's History Month, 2002	Mar 6, 2002	Mar 8, 2002	67 FR 10823	02-5830	—N/a	
129	7531	Bicentennial Day of the United States Military Academy at West Point, 2002	Mar 11, 2002	Mar 13, 2002	67 FR 11379	02-6217	—N/a	
130	7532	National Poison Prevention Week, 2002	Mar 14, 2002	Mar 19, 2002	67 FR 12441	02-6718	36 U.S.C. § 130	
131	7533	National Bone and Joint Decade, 2002-2011	Mar 21, 2002	Mar 26, 2002	67 FR 13703	02-7360	—N/a	
132	7534	Education and Sharing Day, U.S.A., 2002	Mar 21, 2002	Mar 26, 2002	67 FR 13705	02-07361	—N/a	
133	7535	Greek Independence Day: A National Day of Celebration of Greek and American Democracy, 2002	Mar 25, 2002	Mar 28, 2002	67 FR 15091	02-7754	—N/a	
134	7536	Cancer Control Month, 2002	Apr 1, 2002	Apr 10, 2002	67 FR 17597	02-8856	36 U.S.C. § 103	
135	7537	National Child Abuse Prevention Month, 2002	Apr 1, 2002	Apr 10, 2002	67 FR 17601	02-8857	—N/a	
136	7538	National Former Prisoner of War Recognition Day, 2002	Apr 4, 2002	Apr 12, 2002	67 FR 17905	02-9104	—N/a	
138	7539	National D.A.R.E. Day, 2002	Apr 10, 2002	Apr 12, 2002	67 FR 18081	02-9174	—N/a	
139	7540	Pan American Day and Pan American Week, 2002	Apr 10, 2002	Apr 17, 2002	67 FR 19095	02-9606	36 U.S.C. § 134	
140	7541	Jewish Heritage Week, 2002	Apr 12, 2002	Apr 17, 2002	67 FR 19099	02-9607	—N/a	
141	7542	Death of Byron R. White	Apr 17, 2002	Apr 22, 2002	67 FR 19631	02-9979	—N/a	
142	7543	National Crime Victims' Rights Week, 2002	Apr 18, 2002	Apr 23, 2002	67 FR 19635	02-10086	—N/a	
143	7544	National Organ and Tissue Donor Awareness Week, 2002	Apr 19, 2002	Apr 24, 2002	67 FR 20005	02-10201	—N/a	
144	7545	National Volunteer Week, 2002	Apr 19, 2002	Apr 24, 2002	67 FR 20007	02-10202	—N/a	
145	7546	National Park Week, 2002	Apr 23, 2002	Apr 25, 2002	67 FR 20603	02-10424	—N/a	
146	7547	National Day of Prayer, 2002	Apr 26, 2002	May 1, 2002	67 FR 21559	02-10959	36 U.S.C. § 119	
147	7548	Law Day, U.S.A., 2002	Apr 30, 2002	May 6, 2002	67 FR 30307	02-11245	36 U.S.C. § 113	
148	7549	Loyalty Day, 2002	Apr 30, 2002	May 6, 2002	67 FR 30309	02-11246	36 U.S.C. § 115	
149	7550	Asian/Pacific American Heritage Month, 2002	May 1, 2002	May 6, 2002	67 FR 30311	02-11293	36 U.S.C. § 102	
150	7551	Older Americans Month, 2002	May 1, 2002	May 6, 2002	67 FR 30313	02-11294	—N/a	
151	7555	National Charter Schools Week, 2002	May 2, 2002	May 7, 2002	67 FR 30533	02-11486	—N/a	
152	7553	To Restore Nondiscriminatory Trade Treatment (Normal Trade Relations Treatment) to the Products of Afghanistan	May 3, 2002	May 7, 2002	67 FR 30535	02-11487	—N/a	
153	7554	To Extend Duty-Free Treatment for Certain Agricultural Products of Israel, 2002	May 3, 2002	May 7, 2002	67 FR 30537	02-11488	—N/a	
154	7555	Small Business Week, 2002	May 3, 2002	May 9, 2002	67 FR 31105	02-11780	—N/a	
155	7556	National Tourism Week, 2002	May 6, 2002	May 9, 2002	67 FR 31108	02-11781	—N/a	
156	7557	Mother's Day, 2002	May 9, 2002	May 14, 2002	67 FR 34581	02-12230	36 U.S.C. § 117	
157	7558	Peace Officers Memorial Day and Police Week, 2002	May 10, 2002	May 15, 2002	67 FR 34585	02-12297	36 U.S.C. § 136; 36 U.S.C. § 137	
158	7559	National Defense Transportation Day, 2002 and National Transportation Week, 2002	May 10, 2002	May 15, 2002	67 FR 34587	02-12298	36 U.S.C. § 120; 36 U.S.C. § 133	
159	7560	National Hurricane Awareness Week, 2002	May 13, 2002	May 15, 2002	67 FR 34813	02-12371	—N/a	
160	7561	To Designate the Republic of Côte d'Ivoire as a Beneficiary Sub-Saharan African Country	May 16, 2002	May 21, 2002	67 FR 35705	02-12859	—N/a	
161	7562	Armed Forces Day, 2002	May 16, 2002	May 21, 2002	67 FR 35707	02-12860	—N/a	
162	7563	National Safe Boating Week, 2002	May 17, 2002	May 22, 2002	67 FR 35891	02-13029	36 U.S.C. § 131	
163	7564	World Trade Week, 2002	May 17, 2002	May 22, 2002	67 FR 35893	02-13030	—N/a	
164	7565	National Maritime Day, 2002	May 21, 2002	May 24, 2002	67 FR 36495	02-13267	36 U.S.C. § 128	
165	7566	National Missing Children's Day, 2002	May 21, 2002	May 24, 2002	67 FR 36497	02-13268	—N/a	
166	7567	Prayer for Peace, Memorial Day, 2002	May 21, 2002	May 24, 2002	67 FR 36499	02-13269	36 U.S.C. § 116	
167	7568	Black Music Month, 2002	May 31, 2002	Jun 5, 2002	67 FR 38583	02-14239	—N/a	
168	7569	National Fishing and Boating Week, 2002	May 31, 2002	Jun 5, 2002	67 FR 38585	02-14240	—N/a	
169	7570	National Homeownership Month, 2002	Jun 4, 2002	Jun 7, 2002	67 FR 39241	02-14534	—N/a	
170	7571	National Child's Day, 2002	Jun 5, 2002	Jun 10, 2002	67 FR 39595	02-14648	—N/a	
171	7572	Great Outdoors Week, 2002	Jun 7, 2002	Jun 12, 2002	67 FR 40137	02-14974	—N/a	
172	7573	Flag Day and National Flag Week, 2002	Jun 7, 2002	Jun 12, 2002	67 FR 40139	02-14975	36 U.S.C. § 110; 36 U.S.C. § 122	
173	7574	Father's Day, 2002	Jun 14, 2002	Jun 20, 2002	67 FR 42175	02-15823	36 U.S.C. § 109	
174	7575	Lewis and Clark Bicentennial	Jun 28, 2002	Jul 3, 2002	67 FR 44753	02-16965	—N/a	
175	7576	To Provide for the Efficient and Fair Administration of Safeguard Measures on Imports of Certain Steel Products	Jul 3, 2002	Jul 8, 2002	67 FR 45283	02-17272	—N/a	
176	7577	Captive Nations Week, 2002	Jul 17, 2002	Jul 19, 2002	67 FR 47675	02-18556	—N/a	
177	7578	National Korean War Veterans Armistice Day, 2002	Jul 26, 2002	Jul 30, 2002	67 FR 47675	02-18556	36 U.S.C. § 127	
178	7579	Anniversary of the Americans with Disabilities Act, 2002	Jul 26, 2002	Jul 30, 2002	67 FR 49553	02-19401	—N/a	
179	7580	Parents' Day, 2002	Jul 26, 2002	Jul 31, 2002	67 FR 49557	02-19484	36 U.S.C. § 135	
180	7581	The Bicentennial of the United States Patent and Trademark Office, 2002	Jul 29, 2002	Jul 31, 2002	67 FR 49559	02-19485	—N/a	
181	7582	National Airborne Day, 2002	Aug 14, 2002	Aug 19, 2002	67 FR 53723	02-21212	—N/a	
182	7583	National Health Center Week, 2002	Aug 16, 2002	Aug 20, 2002	67 FR 53873	02-21341	—N/a	
183	7584	Women's Equality Day, 2002	Aug 23, 2002	Aug 28, 2002	67 FR 55315	02-22163	—N/a	
184	7585	To Implement an Agreement Regarding Imports of Line Pipe Under Section 203 of the Trade Act of 1974	Aug 28, 2002	Aug 30, 2002	67 FR 56205	02-22502	—N/a	
185	7586	To Modify Duty-Free Treatment Under the Generalized, 2002	Aug 28, 2002	Sep 3, 2002	67 FR 56211	02-22527	—N/a	
186	7587	National Ovarian Cancer Awareness Month, 2002	Aug 30, 2002	Sep 5, 2002	67 FR 56745	02-22748	—N/a	
187	7588	National Days of Prayer and Remembrance, 2002	Aug 31, 2002	Sep 5, 2002	67 FR 56891	02-22779	—N/a	
187	7589	National Alcohol and Drug Addiction Recovery Month, 2002	Sep 4, 2002	Sep 9, 2002	67 FR 57123	02-23006	—N/a	
188	7590	Patriot Day, 2002	Sep 4, 2002	Sep 9, 2002	67 FR 57125	02-23007	36 U.S.C. § 144	
189	7591	National Hispanic Heritage Month, 2002	Sep 13, 2002	Sep 19, 2002	67 FR 58955	02-23997	—N/a	
190	7592	National Farm Safety and Health Week, 2002	Sep 13, 2002	Sep 19, 2002	67 FR 58957	02-23998	—N/a	
191	7593	National Historically Black Colleges and Universities Week, 2002	Sep 13, 2002	Sep 19, 2002	67 FR 58959	02-23999	—N/a	
192	7594	Citizenship Day and Constitution Week, 2002	Sep 16, 2002	Sep 20, 2002	67 FR 59133	02-24158	36 U.S.C. § 106; 36 U.S.C. § 108	
193	7595	National POW/MIA Recognition Day, 2002	Sep 19, 2002	Sep 25, 2002	67 FR 59133	02-24158	—N/a	
194	7596	Minority Enterprise Development Week, 2002	Sep 20, 2002	Sep 25, 2002	67 FR 60101	02-24465	—N/a	
195	7597	Family Day, 2002	Sep 20, 2002	Sep 25, 2002	67 FR 60103	02-24466	—N/a	
196	7598	Gold Star Mother's Day, 2002	Sep 27, 2002	Oct 3, 2002	67 FR 62159	02-25367	—N/a	
196	7599	National Breast Cancer Awareness Month, 2002	Oct 1, 2002	Oct 4, 2002	67 FR 62165	02-25466	—N/a	
197	7600	National Disability Employment Awareness Month, 2002	Oct 1, 2002	Oct 4, 2002	67 FR 62167	02-25467	—N/a	
198	7601	National Domestic Violence Awareness Month, 2002	Oct 1, 2002	Oct 4, 2002	67 FR 62169	02-25468	—N/a	
199	7602	Fire Prevention Week, 2002	Oct 4, 2002	Oct 9, 2002	67 FR 62863	02-25897	—N/a	
200	7603	Child Health Day, 2002	Oct 4, 2002	Oct 9, 2002	67 FR 62865	02-25898^{214}	36 U.S.C. § 105	
201	7604	German-American Day, 2002	Oct 4, 2002	Oct 9, 2002	67 FR 62867	02-25899^{214}	—N/a	
202	7605	Leif Erikson Day, 2002	Oct 8, 2002	Oct 11, 2002	67 FR 63525	02-26242	36 U.S.C. § 114	
203	7606	Columbus Day, 2002	Oct 9, 2002	Oct 15, 2002	67 FR 63809	02-26373	36 U.S.C. § 107	
204	7607	General Pulaski Memorial Day, 2002	Oct 10, 2002	Oct 16, 2002	67 FR 64023	02-26521	—N/a	
205	7608	National Cystic Fibrosis Awareness Week, 2002	Oct 11, 2002	Oct 17, 2002	67 FR 64027	02-26628	—N/a	
206	7609	National School Lunch Week, 2002	Oct 11, 2002	Oct 17, 2002	67 FR 64029	02-26629	36 U.S.C. § 132	
207	7610	White Cane Safety Day, 2002	Oct 11, 2002	Oct 17, 2002	67 FR 64031	02-26630	36 U.S.C. § 132	
208	7611	Year of Clean Water, 2002-2003	Oct 17, 2002	Oct 22, 2002	67 FR 64031	02-26630	—N/a	
209	7612	National Character Counts Week, 2002	Oct 18, 2002	Oct 23, 2002	67 FR 65279	02-27192	—N/a	
210	7613	National Forest Products Week, 2002	Oct 18, 2002	Oct 23, 2002	67 FR 65283	02-27193	—N/a	
211	7614	United Nations Day, 2002	Oct 23, 2002	Oct 28, 2002	67 FR 65867	02-27547	—N/a	
212	7615	National Family Caregivers Month, 2002	Oct 29, 2002	Nov 1, 2002	67 FR 67085	02-28058	—N/a	
213	7616	To Implement the Andean Trade Promotion and Drug Eradication Act	Oct 31, 2002	Nov 5, 2002	67 FR 67283	02-28258	—N/a	
214	7617	National Alzheimer's Disease Awareness Month, 2002	Oct 31, 2002	Nov 5, 2002	67 FR 67293	02-28259	—N/a	
215	7618	National Diabetes Month, 2002	Oct 31, 2002	Nov 5, 2002	67 FR 67295	02-28260	—N/a	
216	7619	National Adoption Month, 2002	Nov 1, 2002	Nov 6, 2002	67 FR 67769	02-28432	—N/a	
217	7620	National American Indian Heritage Month, 2002	Nov 1, 2002	Nov 6, 2002	67 FR 67773	02-28433	—N/a	
218	7621	National Hospice Month, 2002	Nov 1, 2002	Nov 6, 2002	67 FR 67775	02-28434	—N/a	
219	7622	In Celebration of the Centennial of the West Wing of the White House, 2002	Nov 5, 2002	Nov 8, 2002	67 FR 68017	02-28711	—N/a	
220	7623	Veterans Day, 2002	Nov 6, 2002	Nov 12, 2002	67 FR 68749	02-28892	36 U.S.C. § 145	
221	7624	National Employer Support of the Guard and Reserve Week, 2002	Nov 8, 2002	Nov 13, 2002	67 FR 68919	02-28995	—N/a	

=== 2008 ===
Rel #	Abs #	Title/Description	Date signed	Date published	FR Citation	FR Doc #	United States Code	Ref.
222	8315	National Adoption Month, 2008	Oct 31, 2008	Nov 5, 2008	73 FR 65959	E8-26522	—N/a	
223	8316	National Hospice Month, 2008	Oct 31, 2008	Nov 5, 2008	73 FR 65961	E8-26524	—N/a	
224	8317	Veterans Day, 2008	Oct 31, 2008	Nov 5, 2008	73 FR 65963	E8-26526	36 U.S.C. § 145	
225	8318	World Freedom Day, 2008	Nov 7, 2008	Nov 12, 2008	73 FR 66713	E8-26989	36 U.S.C. § 134	
226	8319	America Recycles Day, 2008	Nov 14, 2008	Nov 19, 2008	73 FR 69519	E8-27642	—N/a	
227	8320	National Farm-City Week, 2008	Nov 19, 2008	Nov 24, 2008	73 FR 70857	E8-28002	—N/a	
228	8321	National Family Week, 2008	Nov 20, 2008	Nov 24, 2008	73 FR 70859	E8-27997	—N/a	
229	8322	Thanksgiving Day, 2008	Nov 21, 2008	Nov 26, 2008	73 FR 72301	E8-28415	—N/a	
230	8323	To Provide for Duty-Free Treatment Under the Earned Import Allowance Program, and for Other Purposes, 2008	Nov 25, 2008	Nov 28, 2008	73 FR 72677	E8-28537	—N/a	
231	8324	National Drunk and Drugged Driving Prevention Month, 2008	Nov 26, 2008	Dec 2, 2008	73 FR 73149	E8-28687	—N/a	
232	8325	World AIDS Day, 2008	Nov 26, 2008	Dec 2, 2008	73 FR 73151	E8-28691	—N/a	
233	8326	National Pearl Harbor Remembrance Day, 2008	Dec 5, 2008	Dec 9, 2008	73 FR 74925	E8-29315	36 U.S.C. § 108	
234	8327	Establishment of the World War II Valor in the Pacific National Monument	Dec 5, 2008	Dec 10, 2008	73 FR 75293	E8-29344	—N/a	
235	8328	Human Rights Day, Bill of Rights Day, and Human Rights Week, 2008	Dec 9, 2008	Dec 12, 2008	73 FR 75925	E8-29704	36 U.S.C. § 129	
236	8329	Wright Brothers Day, 2008	Dec 16, 2008	Dec 19, 2008	73 FR 78147	E8-30371	36 U.S.C. § 143	
237	8330	To Take Certain Actions Under the African Growth and Opportunity Act and the Generalized System of Preferences	Dec 19, 2008	Dec 23, 2008	73 FR 78913	E8-30765	—N/a	
238	8331	To Implement the Dominican Republic-Central America-United States Free Trade Agreement with Respect to Costa Rica and for Other Purposes	Dec 23, 2008	Dec 30, 2008	73 FR 79585	E8-31137	—N/a	
239	8332	To Implement the United States-Oman Free Trade Agreement	Dec 29, 2008	Dec 31, 2008	73 FR 80289	E8-31234	—N/a	
240	8333	National Mentoring Month, 2009	Dec 30, 2008	Jan 7, 2009	74 FR 609	E9-113	—N/a	
241	8334	To Extend Duty-Free Treatment for Certain Agricultural Products of Israel and for Other Purposes, 2008	Dec 31, 2008	Jan 7, 2009	74 FR 611	E9-115	—N/a	

=== 2009 ===
Rel #	Abs #	Title/Description	Date signed	Date published	FR Citation	FR Doc #	United States Code	Ref.
242	8335	Establishment of the Marianas Trench Marine National Monument	Jan 6, 2009	Jan 12, 2009	74 FR 1555	E9-496	—N/a	
243	8336	Establishment—the Pacific Remote Islands Marine National Monument	Jan 6, 2009	Jan 12, 2009	74 FR 1565	E9-500	—N/a	
244	8337	Establishment of the Rose Atoll Marine National Monument	Jan 6, 2009	Jan 12, 2009	74 FR 1577	E9-505	—N/a	
245	8338	Religious Freedom Day, 2009	Jan 13, 2009	Jan 15, 2009	74 FR 2753	E9-1032	—N/a	
246	8339	National Sanctity of Human Life Day, 2009	Jan 15, 2009	Jan 21, 2009	74 FR 3953	E9-1361	—N/a	
247	8340	Martin Luther King, Jr., Federal Holiday, 2009	Jan 15, 2009	Jan 22, 2009	74 FR 4089	E9-1526	—N/a	
248	8341	To Implement the United States-Peru Trade Promotion Agreement and for Other Purposes, 2009	Jan 16, 2009	Jan 22, 2009	74 FR 4103	E9-1573	—N/a	
249	8342	To Suspend Entry As Immigrants And Nonimmigrants of Foreign Government Officials Responsible for Failing To Combat Trafficking In Persons	Jan 16, 2009	Jan 22, 2009	74 FR 1555	E9-496	—N/a	

== See also ==
- List of executive actions by Bill Clinton, EO #12834–13197 (1993–2001)
- List of executive actions by Barack Obama, EO #13489–13764 (2009–2017)
- List of executive actions by George W. Bush
