= List of proclamations by Joe Biden (2021) =

The president of the United States may take any of several kinds of executive actions.

Executive orders are issued to help officers and agencies of the executive branch manage the operations within the federal government itself. Presidential memoranda are closely related, and have the force of law on the Executive Branch, but are generally considered less prestigious. Presidential memoranda do not have an established process for issuance, and unlike executive orders, they are not numbered. A presidential determination results in an official policy or position of the executive branch of the United States government. A presidential proclamation is a statement issued by a president on a matter of public policy, under specific authority granted to the president by Congress, typically on a matter of widespread interest. Administrative orders are signed documents such as notices, letters, and orders, that can be issued to conduct administrative operations of the federal government. A presidential notice or a presidential sequestration order can also be issued. National security directives (Note: National Security and Homeland Security Presidential Directives address continuity of government in the event of a "catastrophic emergency" disrupting the U.S. population, economy, environment, infrastructure and government policy.) operate like executive orders, but are only in the area of national security. They have been issued by different presidents under various names.

Listed below are the presidential proclamations signed by United States President Joe Biden, beginning with Proclamation 10140. President Biden has signed 745 presidential proclamations.

== Presidential proclamations ==
View source data.
Cumulative number of proclamations signed by Joe Biden

=== 2021 ===
Relative no.	Absolute no.	Title / description	Date signed	Date published	FR citation	FR doc. number	Ref.
1	10140	A National Day of Unity	January 20, 2021	January 25, 2021	86 FR 7003	2021-01748	
2	10141	Ending Discriminatory Bans on Entry to The United States	January 20, 2021	January 25, 2021	86 FR 7005	2021-01749	
3	10142	Termination of Emergency with Respect to the Southern Border of the United States and Redirection of Funds Diverted to Border Wall Construction	January 20, 2021	January 27, 2021	86 FR 7225	2021-01922	
4	10143	Suspension of Entry as Immigrants and Nonimmigrants of Certain Additional Persons Who Pose a Risk of Transmitting Coronavirus Disease 2019	January 25, 2021	January 28, 2021	86 FR 7467	2021-02024	
5	10144	Adjusting Imports of Aluminum Into the United States	February 1, 2021	February 4, 2021	86 FR 8265	2021-02490	
6	10145	American Heart Month, 2021	February 3, 2021	February 8, 2021	86 FR 8537	2021-02675	
7	10146	National Black History Month, 2021	February 3, 2021	February 8, 2021	86 FR 8539	2021-02676	
8	10147	National Teen Dating Violence Awareness and Prevention Month, 2021	February 3, 2021	February 8, 2021	86 FR 8541	2021-02677	
9	10148	Remembering the 500,000 Americans Lost to COVID-19	February 22, 2021	February 25, 2021	86 FR 11597	2021-04097	
10	10149	Revoking Proclamation 10014	February 24, 2021	March 1, 2021	86 FR 11847	2021-04279	
11	10150	American Red Cross Month, 2021	March 1, 2021	March 4, 2021	86 FR 12515	2021-04639	
12	10151	Irish-American Heritage Month, 2021	March 1, 2021	March 4, 2021	86 FR 12517	2021-04641	
13	10152	National Colorectal Cancer Awareness Month, 2021	March 1, 2021	March 4, 2021	86 FR 12519	2021-04644	
14	10153	Women's History Month, 2021	March 1, 2021	March 4, 2021	86 FR 12523	2021-04645	
15	10154	National Consumer Protection Week, 2021	March 1, 2021	March 4, 2021	86 FR 12523	2021-04645	
16	10155	Read Across America Day, 2021	March 1, 2021	March 4, 2021	86 FR 12527	2021-04647	
17	10156	Honoring the Victims of the Tragedy in the Atlanta Metropolitan Area	March 18, 2021	March 23, 2021	86 FR 15559	2021-06140	
18	10157	National Poison Prevention Week, 2021	March 19, 2021	March 24, 2021	86 FR 15775	2021-06252	
19	10158	National Agriculture Day, 2021	March 22, 2021	March 25, 2021	86 FR 15777	2021-06293	
20	10159	Education and Sharing Day, USA, 2021	March 23, 2021	March 26, 2021	86 FR 16023	2021-06433	
21	10160	Honoring the Victims of the Tragedy in Boulder, Colorado	March 23, 2021	March 26, 2021	86 FR 16025	2021-06435	
22	10161	Greek Independence Day: A National Day of Celebration of Greek and American Democracy, 2021	March 24, 2021	March 29, 2021	86 FR 16283	2021-06536	
23	10162	National Equal Pay Day, 2021	March 24, 2021	March 29, 2021	86 FR 16285	2021-06538	
24	10163	César Chávez Day, 2021	March 31, 2021	April 5, 2021	86 FR 17493	2021-07054	
25	10164	Transgender Day Of Visibility, 2021	March 31, 2021	April 5, 2021	86 FR 17495	2021-07064	
26	10165	Month of the Military Child, 2021	March 31, 2021	April 6, 2021	86 FR 17675	2021-07165	
27	10166	National Cancer Control Month, 2021	March 31, 2021	April 6, 2021	86 FR 17677	2021-07166	
28	10167	National Child Abuse Prevention Month, 2021	March 31, 2021	April 6, 2021	86 FR 17679	2021-07167	
29	10168	National Donate Life Month, 2021	March 31, 2021	April 6, 2021	86 FR 17681	2021-07168	
30	10169	National Financial Capability Month, 2021	March 31, 2021	April 6, 2021	86 FR 17683	2021-07169	
31	10170	National Sexual Assault Prevention and Awareness Month, 2021	March 31, 2021	April 6, 2021	86 FR 17685	2021-07178	
32	10171	Second Chance Month, 2021	March 31, 2021	April 6, 2021	86 FR 17689	2021-07179	
33	10172	World Autism Awareness Day, 2021	April 1, 2021	April 7, 2021	86 FR 17893	2021-07238	
34	10173	Days of Remembrance of Victims of the Holocaust, 2021	April 2, 2021	April 7, 2021	86 FR 18167	2021-07289	
35	10174	Honoring United States Capitol Police Officers	April 2, 2021	April 7, 2021	86 FR 18169	2021-07293	
36	10175	National Public Health Week, 2021	April 5, 2021	April 8, 2021	86 FR 18171	2021-07338	
37	10176	National Former Prisoner of War Recognition Day, 2021	April 9, 2021	April 14, 2021	86 FR 19567	2021-07755	
38	10177	National Fair Housing Month, 2021	April 11, 2021	April 15, 2021	86 FR 19775	2021-07861	
39	10178	Black Maternal Health Week, 2021	April 13, 2021	April 16, 2021	86 FR 20023	2021-08008	
40	10179	Pan American Day and Pan American Week, 2021	April 13, 2021	April 16, 2021	86 FR 20025	2021-08010	
41	10180	160th Anniversary of the Unification of Italy and the Establishment of United States-Italy Diplomatic Relations	April 13, 2021	April 16, 2021	86 FR 20027	2021-08012	
42	10181	Honoring the Victims of the Tragedy in Indianapolis, Indiana	April 16, 2021	April 21, 2021	86 FR 20615	2021-08413	
43	10182	National Crime Victims’ Rights Week, 2021	April 16, 2021	April 21, 2021	86 FR 20617	2021-08414	
44	10183	National Volunteer Week, 2021	April 16, 2021	April 21, 2021	86 FR 20619	2021-08415	
45	10184	National Park Week, 2021	April 17, 2021	April 22, 2021	86 FR 21161	2021-08547	
46	10185	Death of Walter F. Mondale	April 20, 2021	April 23, 2021	86 FR 21633	2021-08655	
47	10186	Earth Day, 2021	April 22, 2021	April 27, 2021	86 FR 22105	2021-08835	
48	10187	World Intellectual Property Day, 2021	April 23, 2021	April 28, 2021	86 FR 22339	2021-09001	
49	10188	Workers Memorial Day, 2021	April 27, 2021	April 30, 2021	86 FR 22833	2021-09262	
50	10189	Asian American and Native Hawaiian/Pacific Islander Heritage Month, 2021	April 30, 2021	May 5, 2021	86 FR 23843	2021-09570	
51	10190	Jewish American Heritage Month, 2021	April 30, 2021	May 5, 2021	86 FR 23845	2021-09571	
52	10191	National Building Safety Month, 2021	April 30, 2021	May 5, 2021	86 FR 23847	2021-09572	
53	10192	National Foster Care Month, 2021	April 30, 2021	May 5, 2021	86 FR 23849	2021-09573	
54	10193	National Mental Health Awareness Month, 2021	April 30, 2021	May 5, 2021	86 FR 23851	2021-09574	
55	10194	National Physical Fitness and Sports Month, 2021	April 30, 2021	May 5, 2021	86 FR 23853	2021-09591	
56	10195	National Teacher Appreciation Day and National Teacher Appreciation Week, 2021	April 30, 2021	May 5, 2021	86 FR 23855	2021-09592	
57	10196	Public Service Recognition Week, 2021	April 30, 2021	May 5, 2021	86 FR 23857	2021-09593	
58	10197	Law Day, U.S.A., 2021	April 30, 2021	May 5, 2021	86 FR 23859	2021-09594	
59	10198	Loyalty Day, 2021	April 30, 2021	May 5, 2021	86 FR 23861	2021-09595	
60	10199	Suspension of Entry as Nonimmigrants of Certain Additional Persons Who Pose a Risk of Transmitting Coronavirus Disease 2019	April 30, 2021	May 6, 2021	86 FR 24297	2021-09711	
61	10200	Older Americans Month, 2021	May 3, 2021	May 6, 2021	86 FR 24301	2021-09739	
62	10201	60th Anniversary of the Freedom Rides, 2021	May 4, 2021	May 7, 2021	86 FR 24477	2021-09852	
63	10202	Missing and Murdered Indigenous Persons Awareness Day, 2021	May 4, 2021	May 7, 2021	86 FR 24477	2021-09852	
64	10203	National Day of Prayer, 2021	May 5, 2021	May 10, 2021	86 FR 24697	2021-09946	
65	10204	Military Spouse Appreciation Day, 2021	May 6, 2021	May 11, 2021	86 FR 25799	2021-10038	
66	10205	National Hurricane Preparedness Week, 2021	May 7, 2021	May 12, 2021	86 FR 25943	2021-10128	
67	10206	National Women's Health Week, 2021	May 7, 2021	May 12, 2021	86 FR 25945	2021-10130	
68	10207	Mother's Day, 2021	May 7, 2021	May 12, 2021	86 FR 26147	2021-10215	
69	10208	Peace Officers Memorial Day and Police Week, 2021	May 7, 2021	May 13, 2021	86 FR 26345	2021-10306	
70	10209	Revoking Proclamation 9945	May 14, 2021	May 19, 2021	86 FR 27015	2021-10686	
71	10210	Armed Forces Day, 2021	May 14, 2021	May 19, 2021	86 FR 27017	2021-10687	
72	10211	Emergency Medical Services Week, 2021	May 14, 2021	May 19, 2021	86 FR 27019	2021-10688	
73	10212	National Defense Transportation Day and National Transportation Week, 2021	May 14, 2021	May 19, 2021	86 FR 27021	2021-10689	
74	10213	World Trade Week, 2021	May 14, 2021	May 19, 2021	86 FR 27023	2021-10690	
75	10214	National Hepatitis Testing Day, 2021	May 18, 2021	May 21, 2021	86 FR 27505	2021-10922	
76	10215	National Safe Boating Week, 2021	May 21, 2021	May 28, 2021	86 FR 28687	2021-11457	
77	10216	National Maritime Day, 2021	May 21, 2021	May 28, 2021	86 FR 28689	2021-11458	
78	10217	Honoring the Victims of the Tragedy in San Jose, California	May 26, 2021	May 28, 2021	86 FR 29171	2021-11562	
79	10218	Prayer for Peace, Memorial Day, 2021	May 28, 2021	June 3, 2021	86 FR 29925	2021-11817	
80	10219	Day of Remembrance: 100 Years After the 1921 Tulsa Race Massacre	May 31, 2021	June 4, 2021	86 FR 29929	2021-11874	
81	10220	Black Music Appreciation Month, 2021	June 1, 2021	June 7, 2021	86 FR 30131	2021-11968	
82	10221	Great Outdoors Month, 2021	June 1, 2021	June 7, 2021	86 FR 30133	2021-11972	
83	10222	Lesbian, Gay, Bisexual, Transgender, and Queer Pride Month, 2021	June 1, 2021	June 7, 2021	86 FR 30135	2021-11973	
84	10223	National Caribbean-American Heritage Month, 2021	June 1, 2021	June 7, 2021	86 FR 30137	2021-11976	
85	10224	National Homeownership Month, 2021	June 1, 2021	June 7, 2021	86 FR 30139	2021-11977	
86	10225	National Immigrant Heritage Month, 2021	June 1, 2021	June 7, 2021	86 FR 30141	2021-11978	
87	10226	National Ocean Month, 2021	June 1, 2021	June 7, 2021	86 FR 30143	2021-11979	
88	10227	Flag Day and National Flag Week, 2021	June 11, 2021	June 16, 2021	86 FR 31903	2021-12842	
89	10228	World Elder Abuse Awareness Day, 2021	June 14, 2021	June 17, 2021	86 FR 32359	2021-13019	
90	10229	Juneteenth Day of Observance, 2021	June 18, 2021	June 23, 2021	86 FR 32717	2021-13451	
91	10230	Father's Day, 2021	June 18, 2021	June 23, 2021	86 FR 32719	2021-13455	
92	10231	50th Anniversary of the 26th Amendment	June 30, 2021	July 6, 2021	86 FR 35385	2021-14497	
93	10232	National Atomic Veterans Day, 2021	July 15, 2021	July 20, 2021	86 FR 38207	2021-15520	
94	10233	Captive Nations Week, 2021	July 16, 2021	July 21, 2021	86 FR 38535	2021-15686	
95	10234	Made in America Week, 2021	July 26, 2021	July 29, 2021	86 FR 40757	2021-16301	
96	10235	National Korean War Veterans Armistice Day, 2021	July 26, 2021	July 29, 2021	86 FR 40759	2021-16302	
97	10236	Anniversary of the Americans With Disabilities Act, 2021	July 26, 2021	July 29, 2021	86 FR 40761	2021-16303	
98	10237	National Health Center Week, 2021	August 6, 2021	August 11, 2021	86 FR 43903	2021-17252	
99	10238	National Employer Support of the Guard and Reserve Week, 2021	August 13, 2021	August 18, 2021	86 FR 46101	2021-17801	
100	10239	Women's Equality Day, 2021	August 26, 2021	August 31, 2021	86 FR 48479	2021-18921	
101	10240	Honoring the Victims of the Attack in Kabul, Afghanistan	August 26, 2021	August 31, 2021	86 FR 48481	2021-18925	
102	10241	Overdose Awareness Week, 2021	August 27, 2021	September 1, 2021	86 FR 48885	2021-19006	
103	10242	National Childhood Cancer Awareness Month, 2021	August 31, 2021	September 3, 2021	86 FR 49887	2021-19323	
104	10243	National Ovarian Cancer Awareness Month, 2021	August 31, 2021	September 3, 2021	86 FR 49891	2021-19324	
105	10244	National Preparedness Month, 2021	August 31, 2021	September 3, 2021	86 FR 49893	2021-19325	
106	10245	National Prostate Cancer Awareness Month, 2021	August 31, 2021	September 3, 2021	86 FR 49895	2021-19326	
107	10246	National Recovery Month, 2021	August 31, 2021	September 3, 2021	86 FR 49897	2021-19327	
108	10247	National Sickle Cell Awareness Month, 2021	August 31, 2021	September 3, 2021	86 FR 49899	2021-19328	
109	10248	National Wilderness Month, 2021	August 31, 2021	September 3, 2021	86 FR 49901	2021-19329	
110	10249	National Historically Black Colleges and Universities Week, 2021	September 3, 2021	September 9, 2021	86 FR 50433	2021-19575	
111	10250	Labor Day, 2021	September 3, 2021	September 9, 2021	86 FR 50437	2021-19576	
112	10251	National Days of Prayer and Remembrance, 2021	September 9, 2021	September 14, 2021	86 FR 50981	2021-19920	
113	10252	World Suicide Prevention Day, 2021	September 9, 2021	September 14, 2021	86 FR 50983	2021-19923	
114	10253	National Small Business Week, 2021	September 10, 2021	September 15, 2021	86 FR 51257	2021-20031	
115	10254	Patriot Day and National Day of Service and Remembrance, 2021	September 10, 2021	September 15, 2021	86 FR 51261	2021-20036	
116	10255	National Grandparents Day, 2021	September 10, 2021	September 15, 2021	86 FR 51263	2021-20038	
117	10256	National Hispanic-Serving Institutions Week, 2021	September 13, 2021	September 16, 2021	86 FR 51577	2021-20163	
118	10257	National Hispanic Heritage Month, 2021	September 14, 2021	September 17, 2021	86 FR 52067	2021-20345	
119	10258	Constitution Day and Citizenship Day, and Constitution Week, 2021	September 16, 2021	September 21, 2021	86 FR 52385	2021-20506	
120	10259	National POW/MIA Recognition Day, 2021	September 16, 2021	September 21, 2021	86 FR 52387	2021-20507	
121	10260	Minority Enterprise Development Week, 2021	September 17, 2021	September 22, 2021	86 FR 52587	2021-20625	
122	10261	National Farm Safety and Health Week, 2021	September 17, 2021	September 22, 2021	86 FR 52589	2021-20627	
123	10262	National Hunting and Fishing Day, 2021	September 24, 2021	September 29, 2021	86 FR 54021	2021-21361	
124	10263	National Public Lands Day, 2021	September 24, 2021	September 29, 2021	86 FR 54023	2021-21362	
125	10264	Gold Star Mother's and Family's Day, 2021	September 24, 2021	September 29, 2021	86 FR 54025	2021-21363	
126	10265	National Voter Registration Day, 2021	September 27, 2021	September 30, 2021	86 FR 54027	2021-21449	
127	10266	Cybersecurity Awareness Month, 2021	September 30, 2021	October 5, 2021	86 FR 55443	2021-21881	
128	10267	National Arts and Humanities Month, 2021	September 30, 2021	October 5, 2021	86 FR 55445	2021-21884	
129	10268	National Breast Cancer Awareness Month, 2021	September 30, 2021	October 5, 2021	86 FR 55447	2021-21885	
130	10269	National Clean Energy Action Month, 2021	September 30, 2021	October 5, 2021	86 FR 55449	2021-21886	
131	10270	National Disability Employment Awareness Month, 2021	September 30, 2021	October 5, 2021	86 FR 55451	2021-21887	
132	10271	National Domestic Violence Awareness and Prevention Month, 2021	September 30, 2021	October 5, 2021	86 FR 55455	2021-21895	
133	10272	National Youth Justice Action Month, 2021	September 30, 2021	October 5, 2021	86 FR 55459	2021-21896	
134	10273	National Youth Substance Use Prevention Month, 2021	September 30, 2021	October 5, 2021	86 FR 55461	2021-21906	
135	10274	National Manufacturing Day, 2021	September 30, 2021	October 5, 2021	86 FR 55463	2021-21907	
136	10275	Fire Prevention Week, 2021	October 1, 2021	October 6, 2021	86 FR 55469	2021-21949	
137	10276	National Community Policing Week, 2021	October 1, 2021	October 6, 2021	86 FR 55471	2021-21953	
138	10277	Child Health Day, 2021	October 1, 2021	October 6, 2021	86 FR 55473	2021-21956	
139	10278	German-American Day, 2021	October 5, 2021	October 8, 2021	86 FR 56181	2021-22134	
140	10279	National School Lunch Week, 2021	October 8, 2021	October 14, 2021	86 FR 57003	2021-22511	
141	10280	Leif Erikson Day, 2021	October 8, 2021	October 14, 2021	86 FR 57005	2021-22513	
142	10281	Columbus Day, 2021	October 8, 2021	October 14, 2021	86 FR 57007	2021-22514	
143	10282	General Pulaski Memorial Day, 2021	October 8, 2021	October 14, 2021	86 FR 57009	2021-22522	
144	10283	Indigenous Peoples' Day, 2021	October 8, 2021	October 14, 2021	86 FR 57307	2021-22583	
145	10284	International Day of the Girl, 2021	October 8, 2021	October 14, 2021	86 FR 57309	2021-22584	
146	10285	Bears Ears National Monument	October 8, 2021	October 15, 2021	86 FR 57321	2021-22672	
147	10286	Grand Staircase-Escalante National Monument	October 8, 2021	October 15, 2021	86 FR 57335	2021-22673	
148	10287	Northeast Canyons and Seamounts Marine National Monument	October 8, 2021	October 15, 2021	86 FR 57349	2021-22674	
149	10288	Blind Americans Equality Day, 2021	October 14, 2021	October 19, 2021	86 FR 57749	2021-22877	
150	10289	National Peace Officers' Memorial Service	October 15, 2021	October 20, 2021	86 FR 58197	2021-23049	
151	10290	National Character Counts Week, 2021	October 15, 2021	October 20, 2021	86 FR 58199	2021-23051	
152	10291	National Forest Products Week, 2021	October 15, 2021	October 20, 2021	86 FR 58201	2021-23052	
153	10292	Death of General Colin Powell	October 18, 2021	October 21, 2021	86 FR 58203	2021-23094	
154	10293	United Nations Day, 2021	October 22, 2021	October 27, 2021	86 FR 59597	2021-23559	
155	10294	Advancing the Safe Resumption of Global Travel During the COVID-19 Pandemic	October 25, 2021	October 28, 2021	86 FR 59603	2021-23645	
156	10295	Critical Infrastructure Security and Resilience Month, 2021	October 29, 2021	November 3, 2021	86 FR 60531	2021-24113	
157	10296	National Adoption Month, 2021	October 29, 2021	November 3, 2021	86 FR 60533	2021-24114	
158	10297	National Alzheimer’s Disease Awareness Month, 2021	October 29, 2021	November 3, 2021	86 FR 60535	2021-24115	
159	10298	National College Application Month, 2021	October 29, 2021	November 3, 2021	86 FR 60537	2021-24116	
160	10299	National Diabetes Month, 2021	October 29, 2021	November 3, 2021	86 FR 60539	2021-24117	
161	10300	National Entrepreneurship Month, 2021	October 29, 2021	November 3, 2021	86 FR 60541	2021-24119	
162	10301	National Family Caregivers Month, 2021	October 29, 2021	November 3, 2021	86 FR 60543	2021-24120	
163	10302	National Native American Heritage Month, 2021	October 29, 2021	November 3, 2021	86 FR 60545	2021-24121	
164	10303	National Veterans and Military Families Month, 2021	October 29, 2021	November 3, 2021	86 FR 60547	2021-24122	
165	10304	World Freedom Day, 2021	November 8, 2021	November 15, 2021	86 FR 62893	2021-24959	
166	10305	Veterans Day, 2021	November 9, 2021	November 15, 2021	86 FR 63303	2021-25036	
167	10306	American Education Week, 2021	November 12, 2021	November 17, 2021	86 FR 64057	2021-25190	
168	10307	National Apprenticeship Week, 2021	November 12, 2021	November 17, 2021	86 FR 64059	2021-25191	
169	10308	America Recycles Day, 2021	November 12, 2021	November 17, 2021	86 FR 64061	2021-25192	
170	10309	Suspension of Entry as Immigrants and Nonimmigrants of Persons Responsible for Policies or Actions That Threaten Democracy in Nicaragua	November 16, 2021	November 19, 2021	86 FR 64797	2021-25418	
171	10310	Antibiotic Awareness Week, 2021	November 17, 2021	November 22, 2021	86 FR 66151	2021-25602	
172	10311	National Rural Health Day, 2021	November 17, 2021	November 22, 2021	86 FR 66153	2021-25603	
173	10312	National Child's Day, 2021	November 19, 2021	November 24, 2021	86 FR 66915	2021-25799	
174	10313	National Family Week, 2021	November 19, 2021	November 24, 2021	86 FR 66917	2021-25800	
175	10314	Thanksgiving Day, 2021	November 24, 2021	December 1, 2021	86 FR 68103	2021-26219	
176	10315	Suspension of Entry as Immigrants and Nonimmigrants of Certain Additional Persons Who Pose a Risk of Transmitting Coronavirus Disease 2019	November 26, 2021	December 1, 2021	86 FR 68385	2021-26253	
177	10316	National Impaired Driving Prevention Month, 2021	November 30, 2021	December 3, 2021	86 FR 68867	2021-26456	
178	10317	World AIDS Day, 2021	November 30, 2021	December 3, 2021	86 FR 68869	2021-26458	
179	10318	International Day of Persons With Disabilities, 2021	December 2, 2021	December 7, 2021	86 FR 69157	2021-26588	
180	10319	National Pearl Harbor Remembrance Day, 2021	December 3, 2021	December 8, 2021	86 FR 69575	2021-26695	
181	10320	Death of Robert Joseph Dole	December 5, 2021	December 9, 2021	86 FR 69975	2021-26810	
182	10321	Human Rights Day and Human Rights Week, 2021	December 9, 2021	December 15, 2021	86 FR 71127	2021-27284	
183	10322	Amending Proclamation 10320, Death of Robert J. Dole	December 9, 2021	December 16, 2021	86 FR 71355	2021-27379	
184	10323	Bill of Rights Day, 2021	December 14, 2021	December 17, 2021	86 FR 71787	2021-27540	
185	10324	Wright Brothers Day, 2021	December 16, 2021	December 21, 2021	86 FR 72505	2021-27841	
186	10325	50th Anniversary of the National Cancer Act of 1971	December 22, 2021	December 28, 2021	86 FR 73591	2021-28312	
187	10326	To Modify the Harmonized Tariff Schedule of the United States and for Other Purposes	December 23, 2021	December 28, 2021	86 FR 73593	2021-28334	
188	10327	Adjusting Imports of Aluminum Into the United States	December 27, 2021	January 3, 2022	87 FR 1	2021-28514	
189	10328	Adjusting Imports of Steel Into the United States	December 27, 2021	January 3, 2022	87 FR 11	2021-28516	
190	10329	Revoking Proclamation 10315	December 28, 2021	January 3, 2022	87 FR 149	2021-28534	
191	10330	Death of Harry Reid	December 29, 2021	January 4, 2022	87 FR 151	2021-28554	
192	10331	National Human Trafficking Prevention Month, 2022	December 30, 2021	January 6, 2022	87 FR 869	2022-00162	
193	10332	National Mentoring Month, 2022	December 30, 2021	January 6, 2022	87 FR 871	2022-00167	
194	10333	National Stalking Awareness Month, 2022	December 30, 2021	January 6, 2022	87 FR 873	2022-00169	
