= List of observances in the United States by presidential proclamation =

Observances in the United States
- Public • Federal • Observance • School • Hallmark
- Observed by: Federal government
- Type: National

U.S. law provides for the declaration of selected public observances by the president of the United States as designated by Congress or by the discretion of the president. Generally the president will provide a statement about the purpose and significance of the observance, and call on the people of the United States to observe the day "with appropriate ceremonies and activities". These events are typically to honor or commemorate a public issue or social cause, ethnic group, historic event or noted individual. However, (with several exceptions) there is no requirement that government or business close on these days, and many members of the general public may not be aware that such holidays even exist. Holidays proclaimed in this way may be considered a U.S. "national observance", but it would be improper to refer to them as "federal holidays". Many of these observances designated by Congress are authorized under permanent law under Title 36, U.S. Code, in which cases the president is under obligation to issue an annual proclamation.

In addition to annual commemorative events, the president may proclaim a day or period designated for mourning or prayer after the death of noted officials including U.S. presidents and chief justices of the United States or after major tragic events or disasters with serious casualties.

The policy of issuing proclamations calling for the observance of special days or events is in 1 CFR Section 19.4, which allows for the responsibility for the preparation and presentation of proposed proclamations calling for the observance of special days, or events to the Director of Management and Budget to such agencies as deemed appropriate. Proposed proclamations shall be submitted at least 60 days in advance of the specified observance, with any approved commemorative proclamations transmitted to the president.

== Annual special days recognized by presidential proclamation ==
Bold text indicates a public holiday, on which most government agencies and major businesses are closed.

- January 16: Religious Freedom Day
- 3rd Monday in January: **Martin Luther King Jr. Federal Holiday**
- 3rd Sunday in January: National Sanctity of Human Life Day
- various March/April: Education and Sharing Day (based on Hebrew calendar)
- February 15: Susan B. Anthony Day
- March 10: Harriet Tubman Day
- March 19: National Day of Honor
- March 25: Greek Independence Day
- March 29: National Vietnam War Veterans Day
- March 31: Cesar Chavez Day
- April 6: National Tartan Day
- 2nd Thursday in April: National D.A.R.E. Day
- April 9: National Former Prisoner of War Recognition Day
- April 14: Pan American Day and Pan American Week
- May 1: Loyalty Day
- May 1: Law Day, U.S.A.
- May 15: Peace Officers Memorial Day
- 1st Thursday in May: National Day of Prayer
- 2nd Friday in May: Military Spouse Day
- 2nd Sunday in May: Mother's Day
- 3rd Friday in May: National Defense Transportation Day and National Transportation Week
- 3rd Saturday in May: Armed Forces Day
- May 22: National Maritime Day
- May 25: National Missing Children's Day
- last Monday in May: **Memorial Day**
- 1st Monday in June: National Child's Day
- June 14: Flag Day and National Flag Week
- June 19: **Juneteenth**
- 3rd Sunday in June: Father's Day
- July 27: National Korean War Veterans Armistice Day
- 4th Sunday in July: Parent's Day
- August 16: National Airborne Day
- August 26: Women's Equality Day
- 1st Monday in September: **Labor Day**
- 1st Sunday after Labor Day: National Grandparents' Day
- weekend before September 11: National Days of Prayer and Remembrance
- September 11: Patriot Day
- September 11: Emergency Number Day
- 3rd Friday in September National POW/MIA Recognition Day
- September 17: Constitution Day and Citizenship Day and Constitution Week
- September 22: American Business Women's Day
- September 28: National Good Neighbor Day
- 4th Monday in September: Family Day
- last Sunday in September: Gold Star Mother's Day
- 1st Monday in October: Child Health Day
- October 6: German-American Day
- 2nd Monday in October: **Columbus Day**
- October 9: Leif Erikson Day
- October 11: General Pulaski Memorial Day
- October 14: National Day of Remembrance of Charlie Kirk
- October 15: White Cane Safety Day
- October 24: United Nations Day
- November 9: World Freedom Day
- November 11: **Veterans Day**
- November 15: National Philanthropy Day
- November 15: America Recycles Day
- 4th Thursday in November: **Thanksgiving Day**
- Friday after Thanksgiving: Native American Heritage Day
- December 1: World AIDS Day
- December 3: International Day of Persons with Disabilities
- December 7: National Pearl Harbor Remembrance Day
- December 10: Human Rights Day and Human Rights Week
- December 15: Bill of Rights Day
- December 17: Wright Brothers Day

== Annual special weeks recognized by presidential proclamation ==
- 1st week of March: Save Your Vision Week
- 3rd week of March: National Poison Prevention Week
- last week of April: National Volunteer Week
- varies in April: Crime Victims' Rights Week
- varies in April: National Park Week
- first week of May: Public Service Recognition Week
- third week of May: World Trade Week
- third week of May: National Hurricane Preparedness Week
- week prior to Memorial Day: National Safe Boating Week
- third week of July: Captive Nations Week
- varies in August: National Employer Support of the Guard and Reserve Week
- 3rd week of September: National Farm Safety and Health Week
- varies in September: National Historically Black Colleges and Universities Week
- week of October 9: Fire Prevention Week
- week of 2nd Sunday in October: National School Lunch Week
- week of 3rd Sunday in October: National Forest Products Week
- 3rd week in October: National Character Counts Week
- varies in October: Minority Enterprise Development Week
- week prior to Thanksgiving: National Farm-City Week
- week of Thanksgiving: National Family Week

== Annual special months recognized by presidential proclamation ==
- January: National Mentoring Month
- January: Stalking Awareness Month
- January: Slavery and Human Trafficking Prevention Month
- February: American Heart Month
- February: Black History Month
- February: Career and Technical Education Month
- February: Teen Dating Violence Awareness Month
- March: American Red Cross Month
- March: Women's History Month
- March: Irish-American Heritage Month
- April: Arab American Heritage Month
- April: Cancer Control Month
- April: National Donate Life Month
- April: National Child Abuse Prevention Month
- April: National Sexual Assault Awareness Month
- April: National Financial Literacy Month
- May: Older Americans Month
- May: Jewish American Heritage Month
- May: (Revoked) Asian Pacific American Heritage Month
- May: Mental Health Awareness Month
- May: National Physical Fitness and Sports Month
- May: National Foster Care Month
- June: Gay and Lesbian Pride Month
- June: Caribbean-American Heritage Month
- June: Great Outdoors Month
- June: National Oceans Month
- June: African-American Music Appreciation Month
- July: National Ice Cream Month
- September: National Childhood Cancer Awareness Month
- September: National Sickle Cell Awareness Month
- September: National Alcohol and Drug Addiction Recovery Month
- September: National Ovarian and Prostate Cancer Awareness Month
- September: National Wilderness Month
- September: National Preparedness Month
- September: National Childhood Obesity Awareness Month
- September: Prostate Cancer Awareness Month
- September 15 – October 15: National Hispanic Heritage Month
- October: National Information Literacy Awareness Month
- October: Italian-American Heritage and Culture Month
- October: Country Music Month
- October: National Breast Cancer Awareness Month
- October: National Domestic Violence Awareness Month
- October: National Arts & Humanities Month
- October: National Disability Employment Awareness Month
- October: National Cyber Security Awareness Month
- October: National Energy Dominance Month [formerly National Energy Awareness Month (1991), National Energy Action Month (2011), National Clean Energy Action Month (2021)]
- October: National Down Syndrome Awareness Month
- November: National Entrepreneurship Month
- November: Military Family Month
- November: National Bone Marrow Donor Awareness Month
- November: National Hospice Month
- November: National Adoption Month
- November: National Family Caregivers Month
- November: National Alzheimer's Disease Awareness Month
- November: National Diabetes Month
- November: National American Indian Heritage Month
- November: National Critical Infrastructure Protection Month
- December: National Impaired Driving Prevention Month

== Defunct observances ==
The following observances have been mandated or authorized by Congress or the President, but are no longer proclaimed or observed on a regular basis.

- March 21 (1982–1988): Afghanistan Day
- March 31: Transgender Day of Visibility
- June 14 (1982–1992): Baltic Freedom Day
- June 25, 1987: National Catfish Day
- October 6, 1972: National Coaches Day

== See also ==
- Public holidays in the United States
- Federal holidays in the United States
- Presidential proclamation
- List of month-long observances
