= List of proclamations by Joe Biden (2023) =

The president of the United States may take any of several kinds of executive actions.

Executive orders are issued to help officers and agencies of the executive branch manage the operations within the federal government itself. Presidential memoranda are closely related, and have the force of law on the Executive Branch, but are generally considered less prestigious. Presidential memoranda do not have an established process for issuance, and unlike executive orders, they are not numbered. A presidential determination results in an official policy or position of the executive branch of the United States government. A presidential proclamation is a statement issued by a president on a matter of public policy, under specific authority granted to the president by Congress, typically on a matter of widespread interest. Administrative orders are signed documents such as notices, letters, and orders, that can be issued to conduct administrative operations of the federal government. A presidential notice or a presidential sequestration order can also be issued. National security directives (Note: National Security and Homeland Security Presidential Directives address continuity of government in the event of a "catastrophic emergency" disrupting the U.S. population, economy, environment, infrastructure and government policy.) operate like executive orders, but are only in the area of national security. They have been issued by different presidents under various names.

Listed below are the presidential proclamations signed by United States President Joe Biden, beginning with Proclamation 10140. President Biden has signed 745 presidential proclamations.

== Presidential proclamations ==
View source data.
Cumulative number of proclamations signed by Joe Biden

=== 2023 ===
Relative no.	Absolute no.	Title / description	Date signed	Date published	FR citation	FR doc. number	Ref.
374	10513	Martin Luther King Jr., Federal Holiday, 2023	January 13, 2023	January 19, 2023	88 FR 3283	2023-01095	
375	10514	Religious Freedom Day, 2023	January 13, 2023	January 19, 2023	88 FR 3285	2023-01096	
376	10515	50th Anniversary of the Roe v. Wade Decision	January 20, 2023	January 25, 2023	88 FR 4719	2023-01599	
377	10516	Honoring the Victims of the Tragedy in Monterey Park, California	January 22, 2023	January 26, 2023	88 FR 4893	2023-01689	
378	10517	American Heart Month, 2023	January 31, 2023	February 3, 2023	88 FR 7347	2023-02430	
379	10518	National Black History Month, 2023	January 31, 2023	February 3, 2023	88 FR 7349	2023-02431	
380	10519	National Teen Dating Violence Awareness and Prevention Month, 2023	January 31, 2023	February 3, 2023	88 FR 7353	2023-02432	
381	10520	30th Anniversary of the Family and Medical Leave Act	February 3, 2023	February 7, 2023	88 FR 8203	2023-02757	
382	10521	National Eating Disorders Awareness Week, 2023	February 24, 2023	March 1, 2023	88 FR 12803	2023-04326	
383	10522	Adjusting Imports of Aluminum Into the United States	February 24, 2023	March 2, 2023	88 FR 13267	2023-04470	
384	10523	Increasing Duties on Certain Articles From the Russian Federation	February 24, 2023	March 2, 2023	88 FR 13277	2023-04471	
385	10524	American Red Cross Month, 2023	February 28, 2023	March 3, 2023	88 FR 13291	2023-04543	
386	10525	Irish-American Heritage Month, 2023	February 28, 2023	March 3, 2023	88 FR 13293	2023-04545	
387	10526	National Colorectal Cancer Awareness Month, 2023	February 28, 2023	March 3, 2023	88 FR 13295	2023-04546	
388	10527	Women's History Month, 2023	February 28, 2023	March 3, 2023	88 FR 13297	2023-04547	
389	10528	Read Across America Day, 2023	March 1, 2023	March 6, 2023	88 FR 13655	2023-04616	
390	10529	National Consumer Protection Week, 2023	March 3, 2023	March 8, 2023	88 FR 14249	2023-04838	
391	10530	National Equal Pay Day, 2023	March 13, 2023	March 16, 2023	88 FR 16169	2023-05510	
392	10531	National Poison Prevention Week, 2023	March 17, 2023	March 22, 2023	88 FR 17143	2023-05989	
393	10532	National Agriculture Day, 2023	March 20, 2023	March 23, 2023	88 FR 17363	2023-06106	
394	10533	Establishment of the Avi Kwa Ame National Monument	March 21, 2023	March 27, 2023	88 FR 17987	2023-06387	
395	10534	Establishment of the Castner Range National Monument	March 21, 2023	March 27, 2023	88 FR 17999	2023-06401	
396	10535	Greek Independence Day: A National Day of Celebration of Greek and American Democracy, 2023	March 24, 2023	March 29, 2023	88 FR 18377	2023-06621	
397	10536	Honoring the Victims of the Tragedy in Nashville, Tennessee	March 27, 2023	March 30, 2023	88 FR 19207	2023-06866	
398	10537	César Chávez Day, 2023	March 30, 2023	April 4, 2023	88 FR 19797	2023-07088	
399	10538	Transgender Day Of Visibility, 2023	March 30, 2023	April 4, 2023	88 FR 19799	2023-07089	
400	10539	Arab American Heritage Month, 2023	March 31, 2023	April 5, 2023	88 FR 20357	2023-07307	
401	10540	Care Workers Recognition Month, 2023	March 31, 2023	April 5, 2023	88 FR 20359	2023-07308	
402	10541	Month of the Military Child, 2023	March 31, 2023	April 5, 2023	88 FR 20361	2023-07309	
403	10542	National Cancer Control Month, 2023	March 31, 2023	April 5, 2023	88 FR 20363	2023-07310	
404	10543	National Child Abuse Prevention Month, 2023	March 31, 2023	April 5, 2023	88 FR 20367	2023-07311	
405	10544	National Donate Life Month, 2023	March 31, 2023	April 5, 2023	88 FR 20369	2023-07312	
406	10545	National Sexual Assault Awareness and Prevention Month, 2023	March 31, 2023	April 5, 2023	88 FR 20371	2023-07313	
407	10546	Second Chance Month, 2023	March 31, 2023	April 5, 2023	88 FR 20373	2023-07314	
408	10547	National Public Health Week, 2023	March 31, 2023	April 5, 2023	88 FR 20375	2023-07316	
409	10548	Education and Sharing Day, USA, 2023	March 31, 2023	April 5, 2023	88 FR 20379	2023-07317	
410	10549	World Autism Awareness Day, 2023	March 31, 2023	April 5, 2023	88 FR 20381	2023-07318	
411	10550	National Former Prisoner of War Recognition Day, 2023	April 7, 2023	April 12, 2023	88 FR 22349	2023-07890	
412	10551	Black Maternal Health Week, 2023	April 10, 2023	April 13, 2023	88 FR 22351	2023-07951	
413	10552	Days of Remembrance of Victims of the Holocaust, 2023	April 14, 2023	April 19, 2023	88 FR 24323	2023-08430	
414	10553	National Volunteer Week, 2023	April 14, 2023	April 19, 2023	88 FR 24325	2023-08431	
415	10554	National Park Week, 2023	April 21, 2023	April 26, 2023	88 FR 25263	2023-08936	
416	10555	National Crime Victims' Rights Week, 2023	April 21, 2023	April 26, 2023	88 FR 25265	2023-08937	
417	10556	Earth Day, 2023	April 21, 2023	April 26, 2023	88 FR 25267	2023-08938	
418	10557	70th Anniversary of the Lavender Scare	April 26, 2023	May 1, 2023	88 FR 26473	2023-09258	
419	10558	Workers Memorial Day, 2023	April 27, 2023	May 2, 2023	88 FR 27395	2023-09414	
420	10559	Asian American, Native Hawaiian, and Pacific Islander Heritage Month, 2023	April 28, 2023	May 3, 2023	88 FR 27655	2023-09522	
421	10560	Jewish American Heritage Month, 2023	April 28, 2023	May 3, 2023	88 FR 27657	2023-09523	
422	10561	National Building Safety Month, 2023	April 28, 2023	May 3, 2023	88 FR 27661	2023-09527	
423	10562	National Foster Care Month, 2023	April 28, 2023	May 3, 2023	88 FR 27663	2023-09532	
424	10563	National Mental Health Awareness Month, 2023	April 28, 2023	May 3, 2023	88 FR 27667	2023-09535	
425	10564	National Physical Fitness and Sports Month, 2023	April 28, 2023	May 3, 2023	88 FR 27671	2023-09536	
426	10565	Older Americans Month, 2023	April 28, 2023	May 3, 2023	88 FR 27673	2023-09537	
427	10566	National Hurricane Preparedness Week, 2023	April 28, 2023	May 3, 2023	88 FR 27675	2023-09538	
428	10567	National Small Business Week, 2023	April 28, 2023	May 3, 2023	88 FR 27677	2023-09539	
429	10568	Law Day, U.S.A., 2023	April 28, 2023	May 3, 2023	88 FR 27681	2023-09540	
430	10569	Loyalty Day, 2023	April 28, 2023	May 3, 2023	88 FR 27683	2023-09541	
431	10570	National Day of Prayer, 2023	May 3, 2023	May 8, 2023	88 FR 29535	2023-09867	
432	10571	Missing or Murdered Indigenous Persons Awareness Day, 2023	May 4, 2023	May 9, 2023	88 FR 29813	2023-09981	
433	10572	National Teacher Appreciation Day and National Teacher Appreciation Week, 2023	May 5, 2023	May 10, 2023	88 FR 30025	2023-10086	
434	10573	Public Service Recognition Week, 2023	May 5, 2023	May 10, 2023	88 FR 30027	2023-10087	
435	10574	Honoring the Victims of the Tragedy in Allen, Texas	May 7, 2023	May 11, 2023	88 FR 30213	2023-10214	
436	10575	Revoking the Air Travel COVID-19 Vaccination Requirement	May 9, 2023	May 15, 2023	88 FR 30889	2023-10406	
437	10576	Military Spouse Appreciation Day, 2023	May 11, 2023	May 16, 2023	88 FR 31143	2023-10540	
438	10577	National Defense Transportation Day and National Transportation Week, 2023	May 12, 2023	May 17, 2023	88 FR 31453	2023-10658	
439	10578	National Women's Health Week, 2023	May 12, 2023	May 17, 2023	88 FR 31457	2023-10663	
440	10579	Peace Officers Memorial Day and Police Week, 2023	May 12, 2023	May 17, 2023	88 FR 31461	2023-10664	
441	10580	Mother's Day, 2023	May 12, 2023	May 17, 2023	88 FR 31465	2023-10665	
442	10581	National Hepatitis Testing Day, 2023	May 18, 2023	May 23, 2023	88 FR 32949	2023-11054	
443	10582	National Safe Boating Week, 2023	May 19, 2023	May 24, 2023	88 FR 33523	2023-11194	
444	10583	Emergency Medical Services Week, 2023	May 19, 2023	May 24, 2023	88 FR 33525	2023-11202	
445	10584	World Trade Week, 2023	May 19, 2023	May 24, 2023	88 FR 33527	2023-11206	
446	10585	Armed Forces Day, 2023	May 19, 2023	May 24, 2023	88 FR 33529	2023-11208	
447	10586	National Maritime Day, 2023	May 19, 2023	May 24, 2023	88 FR 33531	2023-11209	
448	10587	Prayer for Peace, Memorial Day, 2023	May 26, 2023	June 1, 2023	88 FR 35729	2023-11781	
449	10588	Adjusting Imports of Steel Into the United States	May 31, 2023	June 5, 2023	88 FR 36437	2023-12055	
450	10589	Black Music Month, 2023	May 31, 2023	June 5, 2023	88 FR 36445	2023-12056	
451	10590	Lesbian, Gay, Bisexual, Transgender, Queer, and Intersex Pride Month, 2023	May 31, 2023	June 5, 2023	88 FR 36447	2023-12057	
452	10591	National Caribbean-American Heritage Month, 2023	May 31, 2023	June 5, 2023	88 FR 36451	2023-12058	
453	10592	National Homeownership Month, 2023	May 31, 2023	June 5, 2023	88 FR 36453	2023-12060	
454	10593	National Immigrant Heritage Month, 2023	May 31, 2023	June 5, 2023	88 FR 36455	2023-12061	
455	10594	National Ocean Month, 2023	May 31, 2023	June 5, 2023	88 FR 36459	2023-12062	
456	10595	Flag Day and National Flag Week, 2023	June 9, 2023	June 14, 2023	88 FR 38737	2023-12818	
457	10596	World Elder Abuse Awareness Day, 2023	June 14, 2023	June 20, 2023	88 FR 39765	2023-13170	
458	10597	Father's Day, 2023	June 16, 2023	June 22, 2023	88 FR 40677	2023-13407	
459	10598	Juneteenth Day of Observance, 2023	June 16, 2023	June 22, 2023	88 FR 40679	2023-13410	
460	10599	Captive Nations Week, 2023	July 14, 2023	July 19, 2023	88 FR 46043	2023-15416	
461	10600	National Atomic Veterans Day, 2023	July 14, 2023	July 19, 2023	88 FR 46045	2023-15417	
462	10601	Made in America Week, 2023	July 21, 2023	July 26, 2023	88 FR 48029	2023-15932	
463	10602	Establishment of the Emmett Till and Mamie Till-Mobley National Monument	July 25, 2023	July 28, 2023	88 FR 48705	2023-16211	
464	10603	Anniversary of the Americans with Disabilities Act, 2023	July 25, 2023	July 28, 2023	88 FR 48715	2023-16212	
465	10604	National Korean War Veterans Armistice Day, 2023	July 26, 2023	July 31, 2023	88 FR 49991	2023-16400	
466	10605	National Health Center Week, 2023	August 4, 2023	August 9, 2023	88 FR 53759	2023-17179	
467	10606	Establishment of the Baaj Nwaavjo I'tah Kukveni—Ancestral Footprints of the Grand Canyon National Monument	August 8, 2023	August 15, 2023	88 FR 55331	2023-17628	
468	10607	National Employer Support of the Guard and Reserve Week, 2023	August 18, 2023	August 23, 2023	88 FR 57329	2023-18246	
469	10608	Overdose Awareness Week, 2023	August 25, 2023	August 30, 2023	88 FR 59785	2023-18882	
470	10609	Women's Equality Day, 2023	August 25, 2023	August 30, 2023	88 FR 59787	2023-18883	
471	10610	National Childhood Cancer Awareness Month, 2023	August 31, 2023	September 6, 2023	88 FR 60867	2023-19322	
472	10611	National Ovarian Cancer Awareness Month, 2023	August 31, 2023	September 6, 2023	88 FR 60869	2023-19325	
473	10612	National Preparedness Month, 2023	August 31, 2023	September 6, 2023	88 FR 60871	2023-19328	
474	10613	National Prostate Cancer Awareness Month, 2023	August 31, 2023	September 6, 2023	88 FR 60873	2023-19329	
475	10614	National Recovery Month, 2023	August 31, 2023	September 6, 2023	88 FR 60875	2023-19338	
476	10615	National Sickle Cell Awareness Month, 2023	August 31, 2023	September 6, 2023	88 FR 60877	2023-19345	
477	10616	National Wilderness Month, 2023	August 31, 2023	September 6, 2023	88 FR 60879	2023-19346	
478	10617	Labor Day, 2023	September 1, 2023	September 7, 2023	88 FR 61463	2023-19442	
479	10618	National Days of Prayer and Remembrance, 2023	September 7, 2023	September 12, 2023	88 FR 62443	2023-19799	
480	10619	National Hispanic-Serving Institutions Week, 2023	September 8, 2023	September 13, 2023	88 FR 62687	2023-19921	
481	10620	National Grandparents Day, 2023	September 8, 2023	September 13, 2023	88 FR 62689	2023-19922	
482	10621	World Suicide Prevention Day, 2023	September 8, 2023	September 13, 2023	88 FR 62691	2023-19923	
483	10622	Patriot Day and National Day of Service and Remembrance, 2023	September 8, 2023	September 13, 2023	88 FR 62693	2023-19924	
484	10623	National Hispanic Heritage Month, 2023	September 14, 2023	September 19, 2023	88 FR 64349	2023-20397	
485	10624	National POW/MIA Recognition Day, 2023	September 14, 2023	September 20, 2023	88 FR 64791	2023-20486	
486	10625	Constitution Day and Citizenship Day, and Constitution Week, 2023	September 15, 2023	September 21, 2023	88 FR 65109	2023-20600	
487	10626	National Farm Safety and Health Week, 2023	September 15, 2023	September 21, 2023	88 FR 65111	2023-20605	
488	10627	National Voter Registration Day, 2023	September 18, 2023	September 22, 2023	88 FR 65579	2023-20819	
489	10628	National Historically Black Colleges and Universities Week, 2023	September 22, 2023	September 28, 2023	88 FR 67045	2023-21637	
490	10629	Asian American and Native American Pacific Islander-Serving Institutions Week, 2023	September 22, 2023	September 28, 2023	88 FR 67049	2023-21638	
491	10630	National Hunting and Fishing Day, 2023	September 22, 2023	September 28, 2023	88 FR 67051	2023-21650	
492	10631	National Public Lands Day, 2023	September 22, 2023	September 28, 2023	88 FR 67053	2023-21651	
493	10632	Gold Star Mother's and Family's Day, 2023	September 25, 2023	September 29, 2023	88 FR 67615	2023-21797	
494	10633	Cybersecurity Awareness Month, 2023	September 29, 2023	October 4, 2023	88 FR 68423	2023-22220	
495	10634	National Arts and Humanities Month, 2023	September 29, 2023	October 4, 2023	88 FR 68425	2023-22222	
496	10635	National Breast Cancer Awareness Month, 2023	September 29, 2023	October 4, 2023	88 FR 68427	2023-22230	
497	10636	National Clean Energy Action Month, 2023	September 29, 2023	October 4, 2023	88 FR 68429	2023-22235	
498	10637	National Disability Employment Awareness Month, 2023	September 29, 2023	October 4, 2023	88 FR 68431	2023-22236	
499	10638	National Domestic Violence Awareness and Prevention Month, 2023	September 29, 2023	October 4, 2023	88 FR 68433	2023-22239	
500	10639	National Youth Justice Action Month, 2023	September 29, 2023	October 4, 2023	88 FR 68435	2023-22240	
501	10640	National Youth Substance Use Prevention Month, 2023	September 29, 2023	October 4, 2023	88 FR 68437	2023-22241	
502	10641	National Community Policing Week, 2023	September 29, 2023	October 4, 2023	88 FR 68439	2023-22242	
503	10642	Child Health Day, 2023	September 29, 2023	October 4, 2023	88 FR 68441	2023-22243	
504	10643	Death of Dianne Feinstein	September 29, 2023	October 4, 2023	88 FR 68445	2023-22244	
505	10644	National Manufacturing Day, 2023	October 5, 2023	October 11, 2023	88 FR 70337	2023-22581	
506	10645	Fire Prevention Week, 2023	October 6, 2023	October 12, 2023	88 FR 70565	2023-22663	
507	10646	National School Lunch Week, 2023	October 6, 2023	October 12, 2023	88 FR 70567	2023-22664	
508	10647	German-American Day, 2023	October 6, 2023	October 12, 2023	88 FR 70569	2023-22665	
509	10648	Columbus Day, 2023	October 6, 2023	October 12, 2023	88 FR 70571	2023-22666	
510	10649	Indigenous Peoples' Day, 2023	October 6, 2023	October 12, 2023	88 FR 70573	2023-22667	
511	10650	Leif Erikson Day, 2023	October 6, 2023	October 12, 2023	88 FR 70577	2023-22668	
512	10651	General Pulaski Memorial Day, 2023	October 10, 2023	October 13, 2023	88 FR 71263	2023-22828	
513	10652	International Day of the Girl, 2023	October 10, 2023	October 13, 2023	88 FR 71265	2023-22829	
514	10653	National Character Counts Week, 2023	October 13, 2023	October 18, 2023	88 FR 71725	2023-23097	
515	10654	National Forest Products Week, 2023	October 13, 2023	October 18, 2023	88 FR 71727	2023-23098	
516	10655	Blind Americans Equality Day, 2023	October 13, 2023	October 18, 2023	88 FR 71729	2023-23099	
517	10656	Minority Enterprise Development Week, 2023	October 20, 2023	October 25, 2023	88 FR 73213	2023-23670	
518	10657	United Nations Day, 2023	October 23, 2023	October 26, 2023	88 FR 73527	2023-23803	
519	10658	Honoring the Victims of the Tragedy in Lewiston, Maine	October 26, 2023	October 31, 2023	88 FR 74327	2023-24104	
520	10659	National First Responders Day, 2023	October 27, 2023	November 1, 2023	88 FR 74877	2023-24246	
521	10660	Critical Infrastructure Security and Resilience Month, 2023	October 31, 2023	November 3, 2023	88 FR 75451	2023-24482	
522	10661	National Adoption Month, 2023	October 31, 2023	November 3, 2023	88 FR 75453	2023-24483	
523	10662	National Alzheimer's Disease Awareness Month, 2023	October 31, 2023	November 3, 2023	88 FR 75455	2023-24488	
524	10663	National Diabetes Month, 2023	October 31, 2023	November 3, 2023	88 FR 75457	2023-24497	
525	10664	National Entrepreneurship Month, 2023	October 31, 2023	November 3, 2023	88 FR 75461	2023-24499	
526	10665	National Family Caregivers Month, 2023	October 31, 2023	November 3, 2023	88 FR 75463	2023-24500	
527	10666	National Lung Cancer Awareness Month, 2023	October 31, 2023	November 3, 2023	88 FR 75465	2023-24501	
528	10667	National Native American Heritage Month, 2023	October 31, 2023	November 3, 2023	88 FR 75469	2023-24502	
529	10668	National Veterans and Military Families Month, 2023	October 31, 2023	November 3, 2023	88 FR 75473	2023-24503	
530	10669	Veterans Day, 2023	November 7, 2023	November 13, 2023	88 FR 77491	2023-25056	
531	10670	World Freedom Day, 2023	November 8, 2023	November 14, 2023	88 FR 77881	2023-25223	
532	10671	American Education Week, 2023	November 9, 2023	November 15, 2023	88 FR 78217	2023-25338	
533	10672	National Apprenticeship Week, 2023	November 9, 2023	November 15, 2023	88 FR 78221	2023-25339	
534	10673	America Recycles Day, 2023	November 14, 2023	November 17, 2023	88 FR 80089	2023-25639	
535	10674	National Rural Health Day, 2023	November 15, 2023	November 20, 2023	88 FR 80551	2023-25743	
536	10675	National Family Week, 2023	November 17, 2023	November 22, 2023	88 FR 81337	2023-25980	
537	10676	National Child's Day, 2023	November 17, 2023	November 22, 2023	88 FR 81339	2023-25985	
538	10677	Death of Rosalynn Carter	November 21, 2023	November 29, 2023	88 FR 83303	2023-26350	
539	10678	Thanksgiving Day, 2023	November 22, 2023	November 30, 2023	88 FR 83465	2023-26505	
540	10679	National Impaired Driving Prevention Month, 2023	November 30, 2023	December 5, 2023	88 FR 84679	2023-26840	
541	10680	World AIDS Day, 2023	November 30, 2023	December 5, 2023	88 FR 84681	2023-26841	
542	10681	International Day of Persons With Disabilities, 2023	December 1, 2023	December 6, 2023	88 FR 84683	2023-26898	
543	10682	Death of Sandra Day O'Connor	December 4, 2023	December 7, 2023	88 FR 85091	2023-27043	
544	10683	National Pearl Harbor Remembrance Day, 2023	December 6, 2023	December 11, 2023	88 FR 85817	2023-27218	
545	10684	Human Rights Day and Human Rights Week, 2023	December 8, 2023	December 13, 2023	88 FR 86257	2023-27485	
546	10685	Suspension of Entry as Immigrants and Nonimmigrants of Persons Enabling Corruption	December 11, 2023	December 14, 2023	88 FR 86541	2023-27630	
547	10686	Bill of Rights Day, 2023	December 14, 2023	December 19, 2023	88 FR 87653	2023-27968	
548	10687	Wright Brothers Day, 2023	December 15, 2023	December 20, 2023	88 FR 87893	2023-28169	
549	10688	Granting Pardon for the Offense of Simple Possession of Marijuana, Attempted Simple Possession of Marijuana, or Use of Marijuana	December 22, 2023	December 28, 2023	88 FR 90083	2023-28805	
550	10689	50th Anniversary of the Endangered Species Act, 2023	December 27, 2023	January 2, 2024	89 FR 1	2023-28935	
551	10690	Adjusting Imports of Aluminum Into the United States	December 28, 2023	January 3, 2024	89 FR 223	2023-28995	
552	10691	Adjusting Imports of Steel Into the United States	December 28, 2023	January 3, 2024	89 FR 227	2023-28996	
553	10692	To Take Certain Actions Under the African Growth and Opportunity Act and for Other Purposes	December 29, 2023	January 4, 2024	89 FR 437	2024-00051	
554	10693	National Human Trafficking Prevention Month, 2024	December 29, 2023	January 4, 2024	89 FR 443	2024-00052	
555	10694	National Mentoring Month, 2024	December 29, 2023	January 4, 2024	89 FR 445	2024-00053	
556	10695	National Stalking Awareness Month, 2024	December 29, 2023	January 4, 2024	89 FR 447	2024-00061	
