= National Sanctity of Human Life Day =

Anti-abortion observance

National Sanctity of Human Life Day is an observance declared by several United States Presidents who opposed abortion typically proclaimed on or near the anniversary of the Supreme Court's decision in Roe v. Wade.

== History ==
President Ronald Reagan issued a presidential proclamation on January 13, 1984, designating Sunday, January 22, 1984 as National Sanctity of Human Life Day, noting that it was the 11th anniversary of Roe v. Wade, in which the Supreme Court issued a ruling that guaranteed women access to abortion. President Reagan was a strong anti-abortion advocate who said that in Roe v. Wade the Supreme Court "struck down our laws protecting the lives of unborn children".

Reagan issued the proclamation annually thereafter, designating Sanctity of Human Life Day to be the closest Sunday to the original January 22 date. His successor, George H. W. Bush, continued the annual proclamation throughout his presidency. Bush's successor, Bill Clinton, discontinued the practice throughout his eight years in office, but Bush's son and Clinton's successor, George W. Bush, resumed the proclamation and did so every year of his presidency.

At the end of the first year of his presidency, Donald Trump issued a proclamation declaring Monday, January 22, 2018 to be National Sanctity of Human Life Day; however, the next year, his proclamation set it again to a Sunday, that being January 20, 2019.

The day is observed in some churches as Sanctity of Human Life Sunday, including in some parishes of the Lutheran Church–Missouri Synod.

According to the Proper Calendar of the Catholic Church in the United States, as requested by the United States Conference of Catholic Bishops (USCCB) and approved by the Holy See, 22 January (or the 23rd if the 22nd is a Sunday) is observed as the "Day of Prayer for the Legal Protection of Unborn Children".

== Response ==
In an amicus brief filed by the National Lawyers Association in the case of Elk Grove Unified School District v. Newdow, National Sanctity of Human Life Day was cited as an instance of the executive branch acknowledging the theistic philosophy of the United States government.

== See also ==
- Abortion and religion
- Abortion debate
- Abortion in the United States
- Abortion-rights movements
- List of observances in the United States by presidential proclamation
