= National Arts & Humanities Month =

National Arts & Humanities Month

National Arts & Humanities Month was established in 1993 and is celebrated every October in the United States. It was initiated to encourage Americans to explore new facets of the arts and humanities in their lives, and to begin a lifelong habit of participation in the arts and humanities. It has become the nation's largest collective annual celebration of the arts and humanities.

National Arts and Humanities Month's four goals are:

- FOCUSING: To create a national, state and local focus on the arts and humanities through the media,
- ENCOURAGING: To encourage the participation of individuals, as well as arts, humanities and other organizations nationwide,
- ALLOWING: To provide an opportunity for federal, state and local business, government and civic leaders to declare their support for the arts and humanities,
- RAISING: To establish a highly visible vehicle for raising public awareness about the arts and humanities.

== See also ==
- Americans for the Arts
- National Arts Awards
