= National Farm Safety & Health Week =

- Official name: National Farm Safety & Health Week
- Observed by: United States
- Celebrations: Agricultural & farming safety and health safety
- Date: Third week of September
- Duration: 1 week
- Frequency: Annual

National Farm Safety & Health Week is a week of commemoration, recognized annually on the third week of September in the United States.

== Origins ==
In 1944, President Franklin D. Roosevelt signed the first proclamation for farm safety due to the high injury rate in agriculture. Agriculture is one of the most hazardous industries with a death rate of 23.2 deaths per 100,000 workers annually according to U.S. Bureau of Labor Statistics in 2013. However, many injuries are preventable through education. Serious injuries and death can be prevented by cautiously approaching field adjustments or repairs, taking precautions to avoid slips and falls, making smart decisions while assigning tasks to youth, using and maintaining the slow moving vehicle emblem correctly, and retrofitting tractors with rollover structures.

== History ==
In September 2015, President Obama gave an official proclamation to accentuate the importance of agriculture for our society and economy as well as affirm farm safety and health programs "America's farmers and ranchers have played a critical role in shaping our progress and forging a better future for coming generations. Through centuries of hard work, they have supplied our Nation with products and services essential to the economic and physical well-being of our society. "Across our country, those who work on farms bolster our economy and nourish our people by providing what we need at a most human level, helping to uphold America's founding creed: Out of many, we are one. This week, let us recognize the steadfast dedication and commitment of agricultural producers and their families, and let us reaffirm our resolve to promote their health and safety."

Over the years, the development and dissemination of National Farm Safety & Health Week materials shifted from the National Safety Council to National Education Center for Ag Safety (NECAS). NECAS is the agricultural partner for the National Safety Council and has been serving the agricultural family and business community since 1997. Each year they provide farmers with programs and materials to promote farmer safety and health.

== Observances ==
President Donald Trump proclaimed National Farm Safety & Health Week on September 15, 2017.
