= National Religious Freedom Day =

United States observance on freedom of religion

Religious Freedom Day commemorates the Virginia General Assembly's adoption of Thomas Jefferson's landmark Virginia Statute for Religious Freedom on January 16, 1786. The statute, written by Jefferson in 1777 and shepherded through the legislature by James Madison in 1786, became the basis for the Establishment Clause of the First Amendment of the U.S. Constitution and led to freedom of religion for all Americans.

Religious Freedom Day is commemorated on January 16 via a proclamation by the President of the United States since 1993. Legislation has been introduced in Minnesota to commemorate Religious Freedom Day in the state as well. It is not a federal holiday.

== See also ==
- International Religious Freedom Day
