= National Poison Prevention Week =

American observance in March

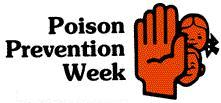
The National Poison Prevention Week logo

National Poison Prevention Week is observed in the United States the third week of March. The goal of the week is to raise awareness of the risk of being poisoned by household products, medicines, pesticides, plants, bites and stings, food poisoning, and fumes. Awareness being duly raised, it is hoped that this will prevent poisoning.

== Origin ==
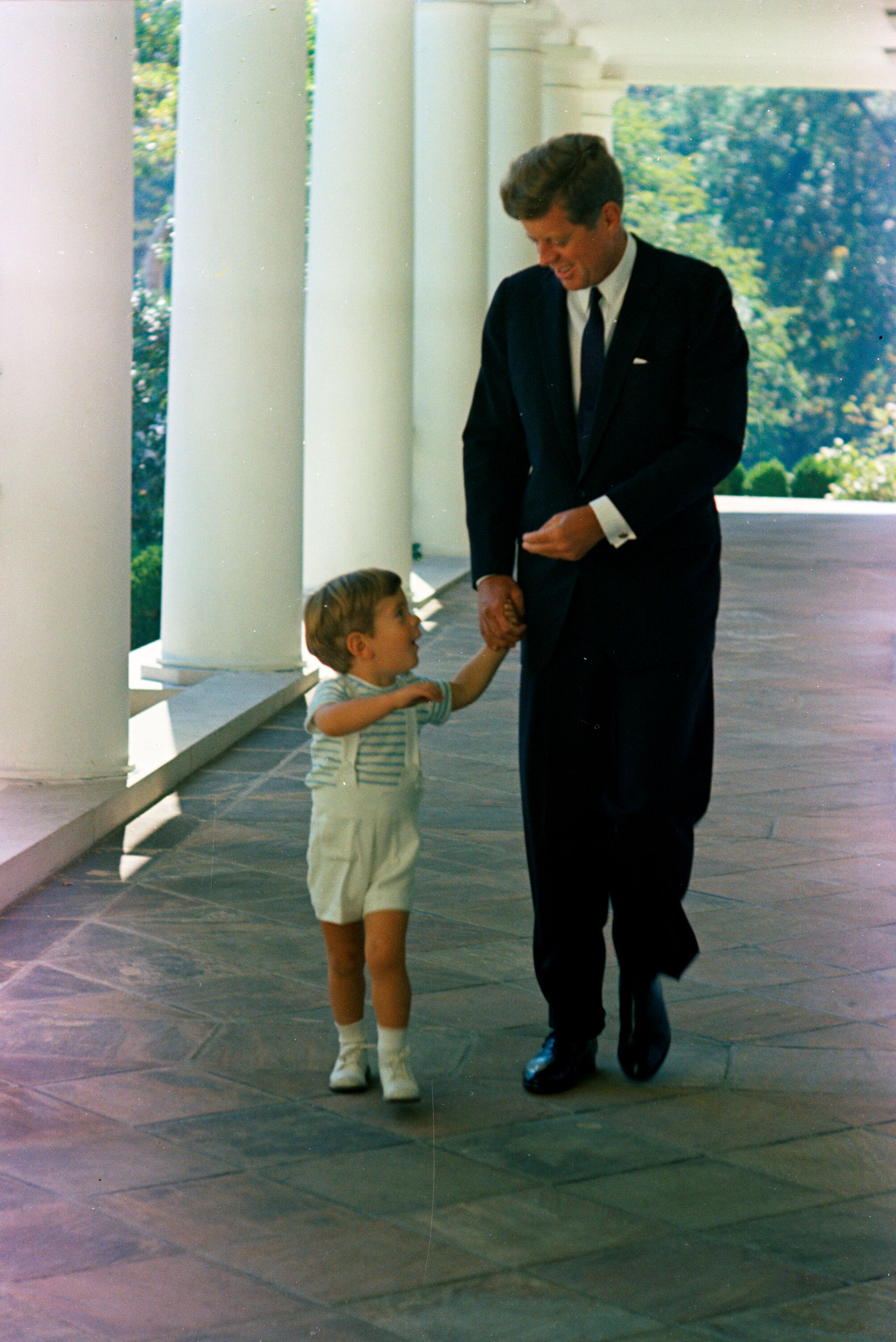
John F. Kennedy, who proclaimed National Poison Prevention Week in early 1962, together with his son, John F. Kennedy Jr. National Poison Prevention Week is particularly concerned with preventing the poisoning of children, who are the major victims of poisoning.

On September 26, 1961, the 87th United States Congress passed a joint resolution (Pub. L. 87–319) requesting that the President of the United States proclaim the third week of March National Poison Prevention Week. On February 7, 1962, President John F. Kennedy responded to this request and proclaimed the third week of March as National Poison Prevention Week. The first National Poison Prevention Week was therefore observed in March 1962.

== Poisoning: A National Scourge ==
More than two million potential poison exposures are reported every year to American poison control centers. More than 90% of these poisoning occur in the home, and a majority of these occur with children five years of age and younger.

Though calls regarding children still make up more than half of all calls to poison control centers, they only account for a small percent of the deaths due to poisoning. Poisoning of adults is on the rise in our nation and only stands behind motor vehicle accidents as the leading cause of unintentional injury deaths.

Over 1000 Americans die from poisoning every year.

== Poisoning: Prevent It ==
The American Association of Poison Control Centers, representing the poison control center network of the United States, offers the following poison prevention tips:

1. If you think someone has been poisoned, call 1-800-222-1222 right away. Serious poisonings don't always have early signs.
2. Put the number for your poison control center (1-800-222-1222) in your cell phone and near home phones.
3. Keep medicines and household products in their original containers in a different place than food.
4. Always read product labels and follow any directions.
5. Keep household products and medicines locked up. Put them where kids can't see them or reach them.
6. Buy products with child-resistant packaging. But remember, nothing is child-proof.
7. Never call medicine "candy." Poisons may look like food or drink. Teach children to ask an adult before tasting anything.
8. Learn about products and drugs that young people use to get "high." Talk to your teen or pre-teen about these dangers.
9. Have a working carbon monoxide alarm in your home.

Call 1-800-222-1222 to reach your local poison control center, anywhere in the United States. The call is free, private, 24/7/365, and expert help is available in more than 150 languages.

== The National Poison Prevention Week Council ==
The National Poison Week Prevention Week Council was established in early 1962 to oversee the national observation of National Poison Prevention Week.

As of August 2011, the National Poison Prevention Week Council included representatives of the following organizations:

The skull and crossbones, the international symbol of poison. National Poison Prevention Week seeks to prevent poisoning.

- American Academy of Clinical Toxicology
- American Academy of Pediatrics
- American Association of Poison Control Centers
- American Cleaning Institute
- American College of Emergency Physicians
- American Pharmacists Association
- American Red Cross National Headquarters
- American Society for Testing and Materials
- Art & Creative Materials Institute
- Closure & Container Manufacturers Association
- Consumer Healthcare Products Association
- Consumer Specialty Products Association
- Healthcare Compliance Packaging Council
- National Association of Pediatric Nurse Practitioners
- National Community Pharmacists Association
- National Safety Council
- SAFE KIDS Worldwide
- U.S. Centers for Disease Control and Prevention
- U.S. Consumer Product Safety Commission
- U.S. Environmental Protection Agency
- Health Resources and Services Administration, HHS
- U.S. Environmental Protection Agency
