= Loyalty Day =

American annual observance on May 1

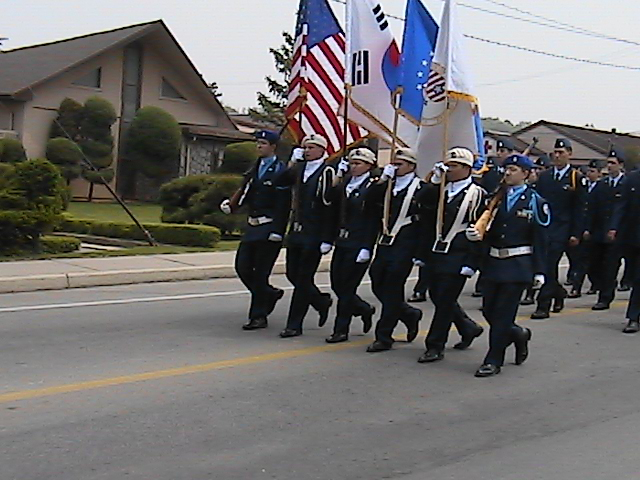
- Color guard walking for Loyalty Day in 2005
- Observed by: United States
- Significance: Special day for acknowledging American history and declaring loyalty to the United States
- Celebrations: Parades and ceremonies
- Date: May 1
- Frequency: Annual
- Started by: Dwight D. Eisenhower

Loyalty Day is observed on May 1 in the United States, though not widely celebrated. It was proclaimed by President Dwight D. Eisenhower as a day for declaring loyalty to the United States and to acknowledge American history.

The date, May 1, was set in order to counter International Workers' Day and was recognized by the U.S. Congress during the height of the Second Red Scare.

Each year on Loyalty Day, the current president is requested to issue a proclamation that asks the American government officials to display the American flag on all government buildings. The proclamations also ask for the American people to observe Loyalty Day with ceremonies in suitable places. The most common way of celebrating is with parades.

== History ==
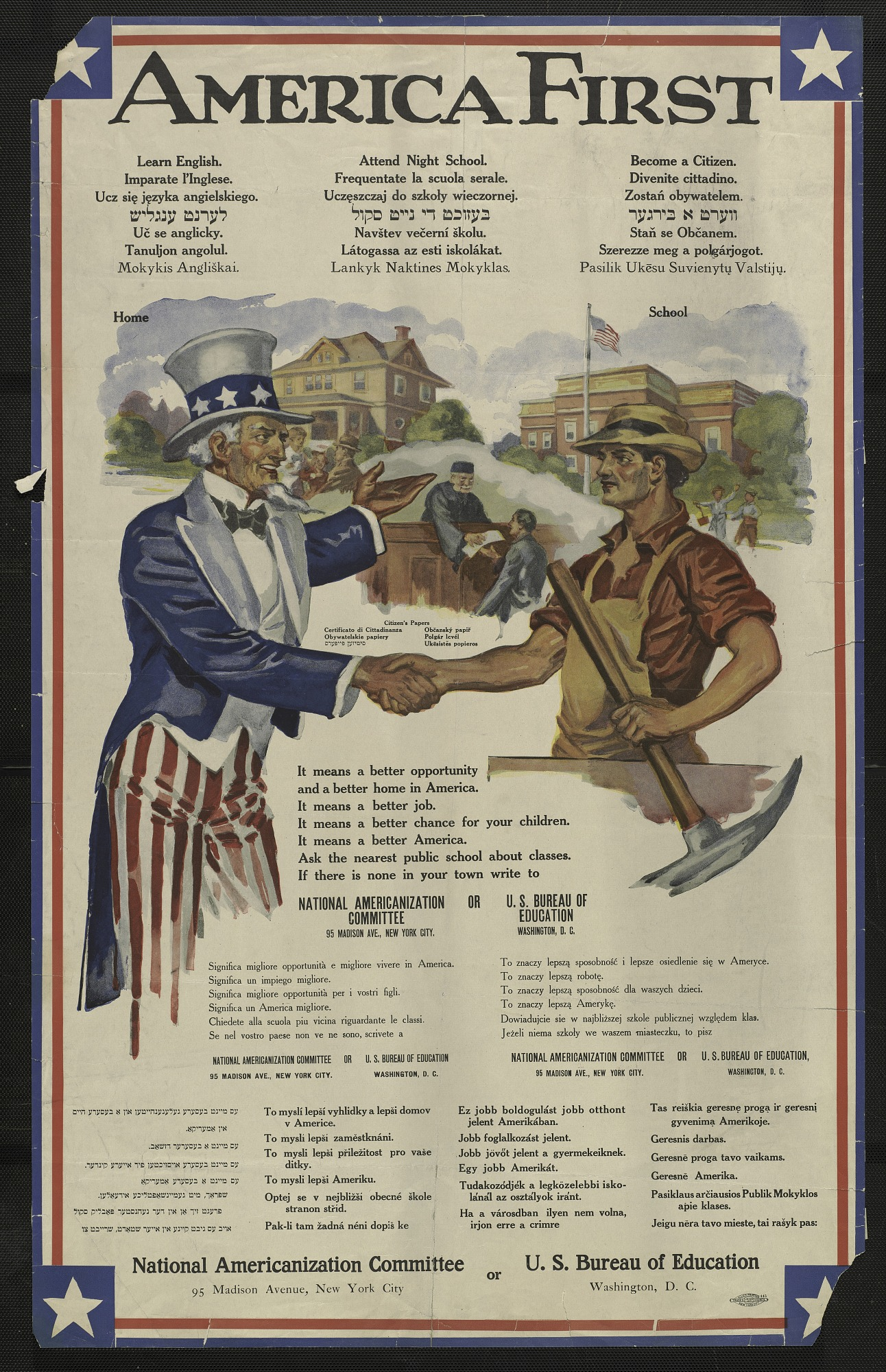
A poster from 1915–1929 used to promote Americanization day, which later evolved into Loyalty Day

International Workers' Day, held annually on May 1, has commemorated the labor struggle since the late 19th century. The date commemorates the 1886 Haymarket affair in Chicago. Social upheaval following World War I, and especially the October Revolution in Russia, developed into the First Red Scare, which led to government crackdowns on organized labor, the communist movement, and other activities seen as "radical". It was in this environment that Loyalty Day (originally called "Americanization Day") was created in 1921 as an explicit replacement for International Workers' Day.

An early celebration held for Americanization Day was on May 1, 1930, when 10,000 VFW members staged a rally at New York's Union Square to promote patriotism.

During the Second Red Scare, it was recognized by the U.S. Congress on April 27, 1955, and made an official reoccurring holiday on July 18, 1958 (Public Law 85-529). President Dwight D. Eisenhower proclaimed May 1, 1955, the first observance of Loyalty Day. In 1958, Eisenhower urged Congress to move Child Health Day to the First Monday in October, to avoid conflicting with Loyalty Day. Loyalty Day has been recognized with an official proclamation every year by every president since its inception as a legal holiday in 1958.

== Celebrations and activities ==
Loyalty Day events, mostly parades, have been held in

- Golden Shores, Arizona
- Calhan, Colorado
- New Lenox, Illinois
- Brazil, Indiana
- Murray, Kentucky (not annually)
- Standish, Michigan
- Norfolk, Nebraska
- Newport, Oregon
- Brandon, South Dakota
- El Paso, Texas
- Rutland, Vermont
- Long Beach, Washington
- Freedom, Wisconsin

These parades usually involve color guards, various marching bands, and even motorcycle clubs, in addition to the appearance of vintage cars and emergency vehicles.

== Statutory definition ==
Loyalty Day is defined as follows in 36 U.S.C. § 115:

(a) Designation.— May 1 is Loyalty Day.
(b) Purpose.— Loyalty Day is a special day for the reaffirmation of loyalty to the United States and for the recognition of the heritage of American freedom.
(c) Proclamation.— The President is requested to issue a proclamation—

(1) calling on United States Government officials to display the flag of the United States on all Government buildings on Loyalty Day; and
(2) inviting the people of the United States to observe Loyalty Day with appropriate ceremonies in schools and other suitable places.

== See also ==
- Holidays of the United States
- Labour Day
- Law Day (United States)
