= Child Health Day =

United States Federal Observance Day

- Observed by: United States
- Date: First Monday in October
- 2025 date: October 6
- 2026 date: October 5
- 2027 date: October 4
- 2028 date: October 2
- Frequency: annual

Child Health Day (Pub. L. 105–225 (text) (PDF), 112 Stat. 1255) is a United States Federal Observance Day observed on the first Monday in October.

== History ==
According to 36 U.S.C. § 105, on Child Health Day, the president invites "all agencies and organizations interested in child welfare to unite on Child Health Day in observing exercises that will make the people of the United States aware of the fundamental necessity of a year-round program to protect and develop the health of the children of the United States." The holiday was enacted by Congress in 1928, and was first celebrated on May 1, 1929.

In 1932, the labor activist Harriet Silverman declared the day a hypocrisy. Silverman stated that rather than providing food, clothing, shelter, or medical care, the presidents merely gave their words and, and blamed the poverty on the parents. During one of President Hoover's addresses he said "The ill-nourished child in our country is not the product of poverty; it is largely the product of 'ill-instructed children and ignorant parents'". One of Silverman's solutions to address the failures of the system that exploited the poor and the millions of starving American children was to hold hunger march demonstrations for free clothes, free lunches in schools, free medical care, and unemployment insurance.

== Observances ==
First proclaimed to be May 1 by President Coolidge in 1928, this national observance has taken place on the first Monday in October since 1926. On Child Health Day, citizens are encouraged to pay special attention to the physical and mental health and safety of children in the United States. Topics covered on this day include prenatal care, environmental hazards, and adolescent issues.
