= National Defense Transportation Day =

US federal observance

- Date: Third Friday in May
- 2025 date: May 16
- 2026 date: May 15
- 2027 date: May 21
- 2028 date: May 19
- Frequency: annual

National Defense Transportation Day is a United States Federal Observance Day observed on the third Friday in May.

== History and definition ==
The observance was first signed into law by President Eisenhower in 1957. According to 36 U.S.C. § 120, on National Defense Transportation Day, the president urges "the people of the United States, including labor, management, users, and investors, in all communities served by the various forms of transportation to observe National Defense Transportation Day by appropriate ceremonies that will give complete recognition to the importance to each community and its people of the transportation system of the United States and the maintenance of the facilities of the system in the most modern state of adequacy to serve the needs of the United States in times of peace and in national defense."

== National Transportation Week ==
National Transportation Week is the week during which National Defense Transportation Day falls, and was established in 1962.

== Celebration and observance ==
The week during which the day falls is often observed by a wide range of activities including poster contests for schools, educational expositions on transport, and programs with guest speakers.

== History ==
On May 16, 1957, Congress designated the third Friday of May each year as National Defense Transportation Day. In 1962 Congress included the whole week within which the Friday falls as National Transportation Week.
