= National Child Abuse Prevention Month =

Annual observance celebrating in April

- Also called: Child Abuse Prevention Month
- Observed by: United States
- Date: Month of April
- Duration: 1 month
- Frequency: annual

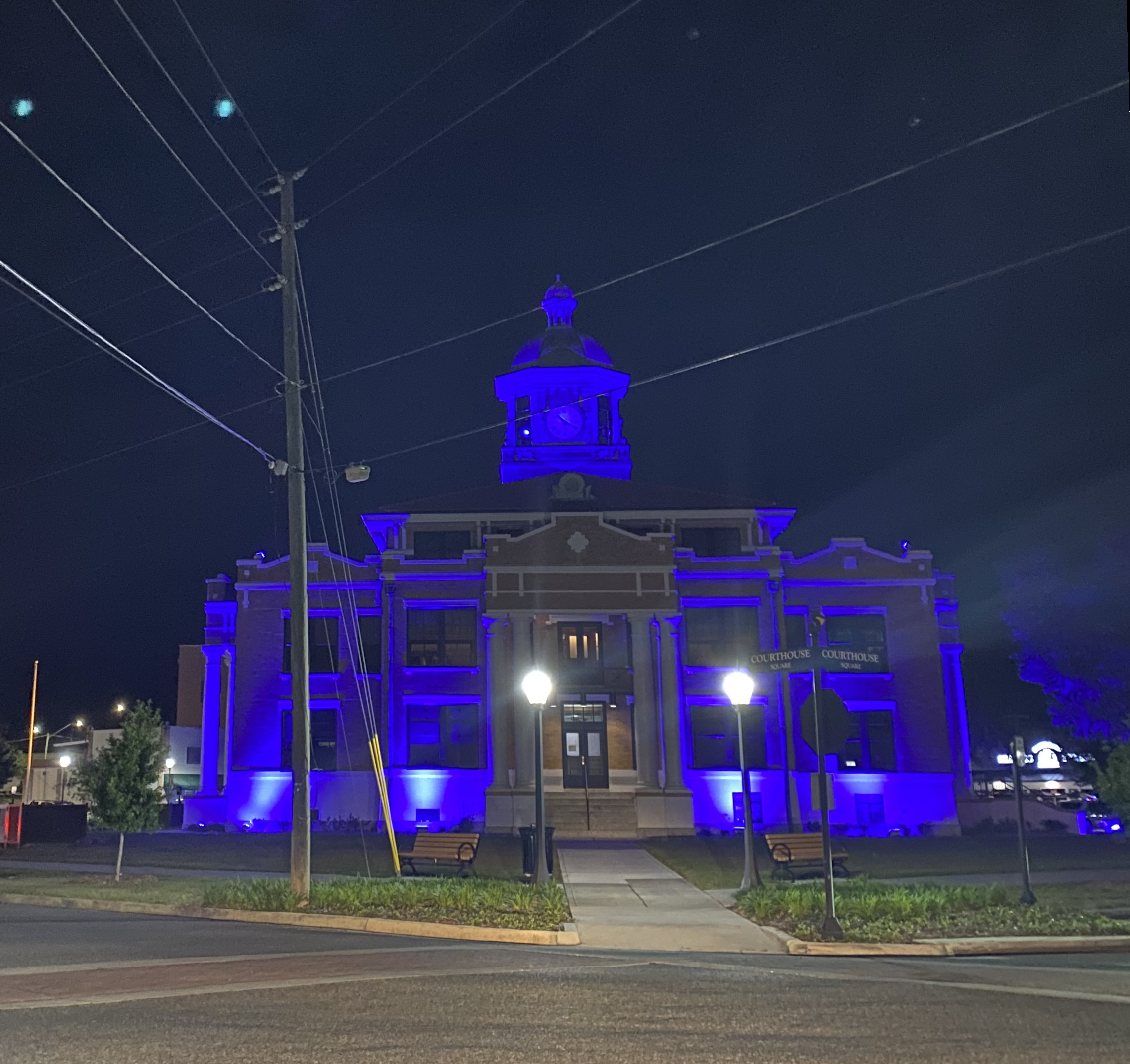
The Old Courthouse in Citrus County, Florida is lit up in blue throughout April in observance of Child Abuse Prevention Month.

National Child Abuse Prevention Month, also known as Child Abuse Prevention Month in America, is an annual observance in the United States dedicated to raising awareness and preventing child abuse. April has been designated Child Abuse Prevention Month in the United States since 1983. U.S. President Barack Obama continued that tradition, and in 2016 issued a Presidential proclamation stating: "During National Child Abuse Prevention Month, we recommit to giving every child a chance to succeed and to ensuring that every child grows up in a safe, stable, and nurturing environment that is free from abuse and neglect."

== Definition of child abuse ==
The World Health Organization (WHO) defines child abuse and child maltreatment as "all forms of physical and/or emotional ill-treatment, sexual abuse, neglect or negligent treatment or commercial or other exploitation, resulting in actual or potential harm to the child's health, survival, development or dignity in the context of a relationship of responsibility, trust or power." In the United States, the Centers for Disease Control and Prevention (CDC) uses the term child maltreatment to refer to both acts of commission (abuse), which include "words or overt actions that cause harm, potential harm, or threat of harm to a child", and acts of omission (neglect), meaning "the failure to provide for a child's basic physical, emotional, or educational needs or to protect a child from harm or potential harm". The United States federal Child Abuse Prevention and Treatment Act defines child abuse and neglect as, at minimum, "any recent act or failure to act on the part of a parent or caretaker which results in death, serious physical or emotional harm, sexual abuse or exploitation" and/or "an act or failure to act which presents an imminent risk of serious harm".

== Purpose of National Child Abuse Prevention Month ==
The U.S. Department of Health and Human Services (HHS) states that for National Child Abuse Prevention Month, communities should rededicate themselves to being supportive of families, and play an active role in preventing child abuse and neglect as well as taking positive action to promote child and family well-being. One way the federal government of the United States provides funding for child-abuse prevention is through Community-Based Grants for the Prevention of Child Abuse and Neglect (CBCAP).

A report by HHS noted that in FFY 2014 in the United States, an approximately 646,000 children were victims of child abuse or neglect, while still another 1,580 children died from abuse or neglect. The majority of child abuse cases result from conditions that can be prevented through community programs, systems, support and interventions.

== History ==
April has been designated Child Abuse Prevention Month in the United States since 1983.

== See also ==
- Abuse
- Abusive power and control
- Adverse Childhood Experiences Study
- Attachment theory
- Child murder
- Cinderella effect
- Complex post-traumatic stress disorder
- Corporal punishment in the home
- Domestic violence
- Dysfunctional family
- Institutional abuse
- Mandatory reporter
- Parental bullying of children
- Reactive attachment disorder
- School corporal punishment
- Sociology of the family
