= National Hurricane Preparedness Week =

In 2004, National Hurricane Preparedness Week in the United States replaced the previous observance of National Hurricane Awareness Week, as awareness does not equate to preparedness. National Hurricane Preparedness Week is a nationwide effort to inform the public about hurricane hazards and to disseminate knowledge which can be used to prepare and take action. National Hurricane Awareness Week 2025 will be May 1-May 7.

== History ==
National Hurricane Awareness Week was started to spread awareness of the dangers and hazards of hurricanes. Being aware is not being prepared, and history has shown that by knowing vulnerability and what actions to take, people can reduce the effects of a hurricane disaster. Therefore, the name was changed to put more focus on the need to be both hurricane aware and hurricane prepared.

== Goals ==
Each day during National Hurricane Preparedness Week addresses a specific hurricane-related topic. The topics covered include: overview of major US hurricanes; hurricane hazards such as storm surge, high winds, and inland flooding; the forecast process; disaster planning/preparation; and knowing when to take action. The goal is to make sure that every family has a disaster plan; every business has a disaster checklist; and everyone gets out of the path of the hurricane safely.
