= List of proclamations by Donald Trump (2018) =

The president of the United States may take any of several kinds of executive actions.

Executive orders are issued to help officers and agencies of the executive branch manage the operations within the federal government itself. Presidential memoranda are closely related, and have the force of law on the Executive Branch, but are generally considered less prestigious. Presidential memoranda do not have an established process for issuance, and unlike executive orders, they are not numbered. A presidential determination results in an official policy or position of the executive branch of the United States government. A presidential proclamation is a statement issued by a president on a matter of public policy, under specific authority granted to the president by Congress, typically on a matter of widespread interest. Administrative orders are signed documents such as notices, letters, and orders, that can be issued to conduct administrative operations of the federal government. A presidential notice or a presidential sequestration order can also be issued.

== Presidential proclamations ==
Relative no.	Absolute no.	Title / description	Date signed	Date published	FR citation	FR doc. number	Ref.
119	9688	National Slavery and Human Trafficking Prevention Month, 2018	December 29, 2017	January 4, 2018	83 FR 587	2018-00099	
120	9689	Martin Luther King Jr., Federal Holiday, 2018	January 12, 2018	January 19, 2018	83 FR 2883	2018-01130	
121	9690	Religious Freedom Day, 2018	January 16, 2018	January 22, 2018	83 FR 3057	2018-01234	
122	9691	National Sanctity of Human Life Day, 2018	January 19, 2018	January 25, 2018	83 FR 3531	2018-01551	
123	9692	National School Choice Week, 2018	January 22, 2018	January 25, 2018	83 FR 3539	2018-01620	
124	9693	To Facilitate Positive Adjustment to Competition From Imports of Certain Crystalline Silicon Photovoltaic Cells (Whether or Not Partially or Fully Assembled Into Other Products) and for Other Purposes	January 23, 2018	January 25, 2018	83 FR 3541	2018-01592	
125	9694	To Facilitate Positive Adjustment to Competition From Imports of Large Residential Washers	January 23, 2018	January 25, 2018	83 FR 3553	2018-01604	
126	9695	American Heart Month, 2018	January 31, 2018	February 5, 2018	83 FR 5171	2018-02430	
127	9696	National African American History Month, 2018	January 31, 2018	February 5, 2018	83 FR 5173	2018-02431	
128	9697	Honoring the Victims of the Tragedy in Parkland, Florida	February 15, 2018	February 21, 2018	83 FR 7591	2018-03728	
129	9698	Death of Billy Graham	February 21, 2018	February 23, 2018	83 FR 8159	2018-03959	
130	9699	Modifying and Continuing the National Emergency With Respect to Cuba and Continuing To Authorize the Regulation of the Anchorage and Movement of Vessels	February 22, 2018	February 23, 2018	83 FR 8161	2018-03962	
131	9700	American Red Cross Month, 2018	February 28, 2018	March 5, 2018	83 FR 9405	2018-04620	
132	9701	Irish-American Heritage Month, 2018	February 28, 2018	March 5, 2018	83 FR 9407	2018-04621	
133	9702	Women's History Month, 2018	February 28, 2018	March 5, 2018	83 FR 9409	2018-04622	
134	9703	National Consumer Protection Week, 2018	March 2, 2018	March 8, 2018	83 FR 10355	2018-04887	
135	9704	Adjusting Imports of Aluminum Into the United States	March 8, 2018	March 15, 2018	83 FR 11619	2018-05477	
136	9705	Adjusting Imports of Steel Into the United States	March 8, 2018	March 15, 2018	83 FR 11625	2018-05478	
137	9706	National Poison Prevention Week, 2018	March 16, 2018	March 21, 2018	83 FR 12243	2018-05875	
138	9707	Vocational-Technical Education Week, 2018	March 16, 2018	March 21, 2018	83 FR 12245	2018-05878	
139	9708	National Agriculture Day, 2018	March 19, 2018	March 22, 2018	83 FR 12471	2018-05980	
140	9709	Greek Independence Day: A National Day of Celebration of Greek and American Democracy, 2018	March 22, 2018	March 27, 2018	83 FR 13097	2018-06303	
141	9710	Adjusting Imports of Aluminum Into the United States	March 22, 2018	March 28, 2018	83 FR 13355	2018-06420	
142	9711	Adjusting Imports of Steel Into the United States	March 22, 2018	March 28, 2018	83 FR 13361	2018-06425	
143	9712	Education and Sharing Day, U.S.A., 2018	March 27, 2018	March 29, 2018	83 FR 13623	2018-06598	
144	9713	Cancer Control Month, 2018	March 29, 2018	April 3, 2018	83 FR 14341	2018-06921	
145	9714	National Child Abuse Prevention Month, 2018	March 29, 2018	April 3, 2018	83 FR 14343	2018-06922	
146	9715	National Donate Life Month, 2018	March 29, 2018	April 3, 2018	83 FR 14345	2018-06923	
147	9716	National Fair Housing Month, 2018	March 30, 2018	April 4, 2018	83 FR 14559	2018-07025	
148	9717	National Sexual Assault Awareness and Prevention Month, 2018	March 30, 2018	April 4, 2018	83 FR 14561	2018-07027	
149	9718	Second Chance Month, 2018	March 30, 2018	April 4, 2018	83 FR 14563	2018-07029	
150	9719	World Autism Awareness Day, 2018	April 2, 2018	April 5, 2018	83 FR 14727	2018-07143	
151	9720	50th Anniversary of the Assassination of Dr. Martin Luther King Jr.	April 3, 2018	April 6, 2018	83 FR 15017	2018-07253	
152	9721	National Crime Victims' Rights Week, 2018	April 6, 2018	April 12, 2018	83 FR 15727	2018-07758	
153	9722	National Former Prisoner of War Recognition Day, 2018	April 6, 2018	April 12, 2018	83 FR 15729	2018-07775	
154	9723	Maintaining Enhanced Vetting Capabilities and Processes for Detecting Attempted Entry Into the United States by Terrorists or Other Public-Safety Threats	April 10, 2018	April 13, 2018	83 FR 15937	2018-07864	
155	9724	Days of Remembrance of Victims of the Holocaust, 2018	April 11, 2018	April 16, 2018	83 FR 16183	2018-08038	
156	9725	Pan American Day and Pan American Week, 2018	April 12, 2018	April 17, 2018	83 FR 17075	2018-08172	
157	9726	National Volunteer Week, 2018	April 16, 2018	April 19, 2018	83 FR 17285	2018-08346	
158	9727	Death of Barbara Bush	April 17, 2018	April 23, 2018	83 FR 17735	2018-08620	
159	9728	National Park Week, 2018	April 20, 2018	April 25, 2018	83 FR 17899	2018-08822	
160	9729	World Intellectual Property Day, 2018	April 26, 2018	May 1, 2018	83 FR 19155	2018-09363	
161	9730	National Small Business Week, 2018	April 27, 2018	May 2, 2018	83 FR 19425	2018-09471	
162	9731	Jewish American Heritage Month, 2018	April 30, 2018	May 3, 2018	83 FR 19599	2018-09587	
163	9732	Law Day, U.S.A., 2018	April 30, 2018	May 3, 2018	83 FR 19601	2018-09588	
164	9733	Asian American and Pacific Islander Heritage Month, 2018	April 30, 2018	May 4, 2018	83 FR 19893	2018-09726	
165	9734	National Foster Care Month, 2018	April 30, 2018	May 4, 2018	83 FR 19895	2018-09727	
166	9735	National Mental Health Awareness Month, 2018	April 30, 2018	May 4, 2018	83 FR 19897	2018-09730	
167	9736	Older Americans Month, 2018	April 30, 2018	May 4, 2018	83 FR 19899	2018-09733	
168	9737	National Physical Fitness and Sports Month, 2018	April 30, 2018	May 4, 2018	83 FR 19901	2018-09737	
169	9738	Loyalty Day, 2018	April 30, 2018	May 4, 2018	83 FR 19903	2018-09739	
170	9739	Adjusting Imports of Aluminum Into the United States	April 30, 2018	May 7, 2018	83 FR 20677	2018-09840	
171	9740	Adjusting Imports of Steel Into the United States	April 30, 2018	May 7, 2018	83 FR 20683	2018-09841	
172	9741	National Day of Prayer, 2018	May 3, 2018	May 8, 2018	83 FR 20713	2018-09893	
173	9742	National Charter Schools Week, 2018	May 4, 2018	May 11, 2018	83 FR 22165	2018-10275	
174	9743	National Hurricane Preparedness Week, 2018	May 4, 2018	May 11, 2018	83 FR 22167	2018-10276	
175	9744	Public Service Recognition Week, 2018	May 4, 2018	May 11, 2018	83 FR 22169	2018-10279	
176	9745	Be Best Day, 2018	May 7, 2018	May 11, 2018	83 FR 22171	2018-10280	
177	9746	Military Spouse Day, 2018	May 10, 2018	May 15, 2018	83 FR 22347	2018-10453	
178	9747	National Defense Transportation Day and National Transportation Week, 2018	May 11, 2018	May 17, 2018	83 FR 23201	2018-10719	
179	9748	Peace Officers Memorial Day and Police Week, 2018	May 11, 2018	May 17, 2018	83 FR 23203	2018-10720	
180	9749	Mother's Day, 2018	May 11, 2018	May 17, 2018	83 FR 23205	2018-10721	
181	9750	National Safe Boating Week, 2018	May 18, 2018	May 24, 2018	83 FR 24209	2018-11368	
182	9751	Emergency Medical Services Week, 2018	May 18, 2018	May 24, 2018	83 FR 24211	2018-11369	
183	9752	World Trade Week, 2018	May 18, 2018	May 24, 2018	83 FR 24213	2018-11372	
184	9753	Armed Forces Day, 2018	May 18, 2018	May 24, 2018	83 FR 24215	2018-11373	
185	9754	Honoring the Victims of the Tragedy in Santa Fe, Texas	May 18, 2018	May 24, 2018	83 FR 24217	2018-11377	
186	9755	National Maritime Day, 2018	May 21, 2018	May 25, 2018	83 FR 24395	2018-11513	
187	9756	Prayer for Peace, Memorial Day, 2018	May 25, 2018	June 1, 2018	83 FR 25327	2018-11909	
188	9757	Great Outdoors Month, 2018	May 30, 2018	June 4, 2018	83 FR 25545	2018-12033	
189	9758	Adjusting Imports of Aluminum Into the United States	May 31, 2018	June 5, 2018	83 FR 25849	2018-12137	
190	9759	Adjusting Imports of Steel Into the United States	May 31, 2018	June 5, 2018	83 FR 25857	2018-12140	
191	9760	National Caribbean-American Heritage Month, 2018	May 31, 2018	June 5, 2018	83 FR 25879	2018-12152	
192	9761	National Homeownership Month, 2018	May 31, 2018	June 5, 2018	83 FR 26197	2018-12157	
193	9762	National Ocean Month, 2018	May 31, 2018	June 5, 2018	83 FR 26199	2018-12159	
194	9763	African-American Music Appreciation Month, 2018	June 1, 2018	June 5, 2018	83 FR 26201	2018-12260	
195	9764	Flag Day and National Flag Week, 2018	June 8, 2018	June 14, 2018	83 FR 27887	2018-12963	
196	9765	Father's Day, 2018	June 15, 2018	June 21, 2018	83 FR 28967	2018-13514	
197	9766	Honoring the Victims of the Tragedy in Annapolis, Maryland	July 3, 2018	July 9, 2018	83 FR 31641	2018-14744	
198	9767	Captive Nations Week, 2018	July 13, 2018	July 18, 2018	83 FR 34017	2018-15509	
199	9768	Made in America Day and Made in America Week, 2018	July 13, 2018	July 18, 2018	83 FR 34019	2018-15510	
200	9769	Anniversary of the Americans with Disabilities Act, 2018	July 25, 2018	July 30, 2018	83 FR 36721	2018-16429	
201	9770	National Korean War Veterans Armistice Day, 2018	July 26, 2018	July 31, 2018	83 FR 37419	2018-16555	
202	9771	To Take Certain Actions Under the African Growth and Opportunity Act and for Other Purposes	July 30, 2018	August 2, 2018	83 FR 37993	2018-16725	
203	9772	Adjusting Imports of Steel Into the United States	August 10, 2018	August 15, 2018	83 FR 40429	2018-17703	
204	9773	National Employer Support of the Guard and Reserve Week, 2018	August 17, 2018	August 22, 2018	83 FR 42583	2018-18306	
205	9774	Women's Equality Day, 2018	August 24, 2018	August 29, 2018	83 FR 44169	2018-18928	
206	9775	Death of Senator John Sidney McCain III	August 27, 2018	August 30, 2018	83 FR 44171	2018-19025	
207	9776	Adjusting Imports of Aluminum Into the United States	August 29, 2018	September 4, 2018	83 FR 45019	2018-19283	
208	9777	Adjusting Imports of Steel Into the United States	August 29, 2018	September 4, 2018	83 FR 45025	2018-19284	
209	9778	National Alcohol and Drug Addiction Recovery Month, 2018	August 31, 2018	September 6, 2018	83 FR 45313	2018-19506	
210	9779	National Preparedness Month, 2018	August 31, 2018	September 6, 2018	83 FR 45315	2018-19509	
211	9780	Labor Day, 2018	August 31, 2018	September 6, 2018	83 FR 45317	2018-19513	
212	9781	National Days of Prayer and Remembrance, 2018	September 7, 2018	September 12, 2018	83 FR 46345	2018-20012	
213	9782	Patriot Day, 2018	September 10, 2018	September 13, 2018	83 FR 46625	2018-20089	
214	9783	National Hispanic Heritage Month, 2018	September 13, 2018	September 18, 2018	83 FR 47279	2018-20468	
215	9784	National Farm Safety and Health Week, 2018	September 13, 2018	September 18, 2018	83 FR 47281	2018-20469	
216	9785	National Gang Violence Prevention Week, 2018	September 14, 2018	September 19, 2018	83 FR 47539	2018-20563	
217	9786	National Historically Black Colleges and Universities Week, 2018	September 14, 2018	September 19, 2018	83 FR 47541	2018-20564	
218	9787	Prescription Opioid and Heroin Epidemic Awareness Week, 2018	September 14, 2018	September 19, 2018	83 FR 47543	2018-20565	
219	9788	Constitution Day, Citizenship Day, and Constitution Week, 2018	September 14, 2018	September 19, 2018	83 FR 47545	2018-20570	
220	9789	National POW/MIA Recognition Day, 2018	September 20, 2018	September 25, 2018	83 FR 48519	2018-21034	
221	9790	National Hunting and Fishing Day, 2018	September 21, 2018	September 27, 2018	83 FR 48903	2018-21244	
222	9791	National Breast Cancer Awareness Month, 2018	September 28, 2018	October 4, 2018	83 FR 50241	2018-21811	
223	9792	National Cybersecurity Awareness Month, 2018	September 28, 2018	October 4, 2018	83 FR 50243	2018-21812	
224	9793	National Disability Employment Awareness Month, 2018	September 28, 2018	October 4, 2018	83 FR 50245	2018-21813	
225	9794	National Energy Awareness Month, 2018	September 28, 2018	October 4, 2018	83 FR 50247	2018-21816	
226	9795	National Substance Abuse Prevention Month, 2018	September 28, 2018	October 4, 2018	83 FR 50249	2018-21817	
227	9796	Gold Star Mother's and Family's Day, 2018	September 28, 2018	October 4, 2018	83 FR 50251	2018-21819	
228	9797	Child Health Day, 2018	September 28, 2018	October 4, 2018	83 FR 50253	2018-21820	
229	9798	National Manufacturing Day, 2018	October 4, 2018	October 10, 2018	83 FR 50803	2018-22186	
230	9799	German-American Day, 2018	October 5, 2018	October 10, 2018	83 FR 51299	2018-22232	
231	9800	Fire Prevention Week, 2018	October 5, 2018	October 11, 2018	83 FR 51613	2018-22333	
232	9801	Columbus Day, 2018	October 5, 2018	October 11, 2018	83 FR 51615	2018-22335	
233	9802	Leif Erikson Day, 2018	October 8, 2018	October 12, 2018	83 FR 51621	2018-22376	
234	9803	National Domestic Violence Awareness Month, 2018	October 9, 2018	October 15, 2018	83 FR 52111	2018-22557	
235	9804	General Pulaski Memorial Day, 2018	October 10, 2018	October 15, 2018	83 FR 52113	2018-22558	
236	9805	Minority Enterprise Development Week, 2018	October 12, 2018	October 18, 2018	83 FR 52933	2018-22936	
237	9806	National School Lunch Week, 2018	October 12, 2018	October 18, 2018	83 FR 52935	2018-22937	
238	9807	Blind Americans Equality Day, 2018	October 12, 2018	October 18, 2018	83 FR 52937	2018-22938	
239	9808	National Character Counts Week, 2018	October 19, 2018	October 24, 2018	83 FR 53797	2018-23415	
240	9809	National Forest Products Week, 2018	October 19, 2018	October 24, 2018	83 FR 53799	2018-23416	
241	9810	United Nations Day, 2018	October 23, 2018	October 29, 2018	83 FR 54511	2018-23776	
242	9811	Establishment of the Camp Nelson National Monument	October 26, 2018	October 31, 2018	83 FR 54845	2018-24027	
243	9812	Honoring the Victims of the Tragedy in Pittsburgh, Pennsylvania	October 27, 2018	October 31, 2018	83 FR 54851	2018-24030	
244	9813	To Modify the List of Products Eligible for Duty- Free Treatment Under the Generalized System of Preferences	October 30, 2018	October 31, 2018	83 FR 54853	2018-24032	
245	9814	Critical Infrastructure Security and Resilience Month, 2018	October 31, 2018	November 6, 2018	83 FR 55453	2018-24357	
246	9815	National Adoption Month, 2018	October 31, 2018	November 6, 2018	83 FR 55455	2018-24359	
247	9816	National Entrepreneurship Month, 2018	October 31, 2018	November 6, 2018	83 FR 55457	2018-24360	
248	9817	National Family Caregivers Month, 2018	October 31, 2018	November 6, 2018	83 FR 55459	2018-24361	
249	9818	National Native American Heritage Month, 2018	October 31, 2018	November 6, 2018	83 FR 55461	2018-24363	
250	9819	National Veterans and Military Families Month, 2018	October 31, 2018	November 6, 2018	83 FR 55463	2018-24364	
251	9820	Honoring the Victims of the Tragedy in Thousand Oaks, California	November 8, 2018	November 14, 2018	83 FR 57303	2018-25042	
252	9821	World Freedom Day, 2018	November 8, 2018	November 14, 2018	83 FR 57305	2018-25046	
253	9822	Addressing Mass Migration Through the Southern Border of the United States	November 9, 2018	November 15, 2018	83 FR 57661	2018-25117	
254	9823	American Education Week, 2018	November 9, 2018	November 15, 2018	83 FR 57665	2018-25122	
255	9824	National Apprenticeship Week, 2018	November 9, 2018	November 15, 2018	83 FR 57667	2018-25126	
256	9825	Veterans Day, 2018	November 9, 2018	November 15, 2018	83 FR 57669	2018-25127	
257	9826	National Family Week, 2018	November 16, 2018	November 23, 2018	83 FR 60331	2018-25766	
258	9827	Thanksgiving Day, 2018	November 20, 2018	November 28, 2018	83 FR 61109	2018-25982	
259	9828	National Impaired Driving Prevention Month, 2018	November 30, 2018	December 4, 2018	83 FR 62683	2018-26540	
260	9829	World AIDS Day, 2018	November 30, 2018	December 4, 2018	83 FR 62685	2018-26543	
261	9830	Announcing the Death of George Herbert Walker Bush	December 1, 2018	December 6, 2018	83 FR 63039	2018-26612	
262	9831	National Pearl Harbor Remembrance Day, 2018	December 6, 2018	December 11, 2018	83 FR 63773	2018-26967	
263	9832	Human Rights Day, Bill of Rights Day, and Human Rights Week, 2018	December 7, 2018	December 12, 2018	83 FR 64021	2018-27096	
264	9833	Wright Brothers Day, 2018	December 14, 2018	December 19, 2018	83 FR 65273	2018-27624	
265	9834	To Take Certain Actions Under the African Growth and Opportunity Act and for Other Purposes	December 21, 2018	January 7, 2019	84 FR 35	2019-00013	
266	9835	National Slavery and Human Trafficking Prevention Month, 2019	December 31, 2018	January 8, 2019	84 FR 79	2019-00049	

== See also ==
- List of proclamations by Donald Trump (2017)
- List of proclamations by Donald Trump (2019)
- List of proclamations by Donald Trump (2020-21)
- List of proclamations by Donald Trump (2025)
