= List of proclamations by Donald Trump (2017) =

The president of the United States may take any of several kinds of executive actions.

Executive orders are issued to help officers and agencies of the executive branch manage the operations within the federal government itself. Presidential memoranda are closely related, and have the force of law on the Executive Branch, but are generally considered less prestigious. Presidential memoranda do not have an established process for issuance, and unlike executive orders, they are not numbered. A presidential determination results in an official policy or position of the executive branch of the United States government. A presidential proclamation is a statement issued by a president on a matter of public policy, under specific authority granted to the president by Congress, typically on a matter of widespread interest. Administrative orders are signed documents such as notices, letters, and orders, that can be issued to conduct administrative operations of the federal government. A presidential notice or a presidential sequestration order can also be issued.

== Presidential proclamations ==
Relative no.	Absolute no.	Title / description	Date signed	Date published	FR citation	FR doc. number	Ref.
1	9570	National Day of Patriotic Devotion, 2017	January 20, 2017	January 24, 2017	82 FR 8349	2017-01798	
2	9571	National School Choice Week, 2017	January 26, 2017	January 30, 2017	82 FR 8791	2017-02092	
3	9572	National African American History Month, 2017	February 1, 2017	February 6, 2017	82 FR 9487	2017-02559	
4	9573	American Heart Month, February 2017	February 2, 2017	February 7, 2017	82 FR 9673	2017-02655	
5	9574	American Red Cross Month, 2017	March 1, 2017	March 6, 2017	82 FR 12707	2017-04503	
6	9575	Irish-American Heritage Month, 2017	March 1, 2017	March 6, 2017	82 FR 12709	2017-04504	
7	9576	Women's History Month, 2017	March 1, 2017	March 6, 2017	82 FR 12711	2017-04505	
8	9577	National Consumer Protection Week, 2017	March 6, 2017	March 9, 2017	82 FR 13223	2017-04859	
9	9578	National Poison Prevention Week, 2017	March 17, 2017	March 22, 2017	82 FR 14809	2017-05859	
10	9579	National Agriculture Day, 2017	March 21, 2017	March 24, 2017	82 FR 15111	2017-06080	
11	9580	Greek Independence Day: A National Day of Celebration of Greek and American Democracy, 2017	March 24, 2017	March 29, 2017	82 FR 15605	2017-06357	
12	9581	Cancer Control Month, 2017	March 31, 2017	April 5, 2017	82 FR 16707	2017-06940	
13	9582	National Child Abuse Prevention Month, 2017	March 31, 2017	April 5, 2017	82 FR 16709	2017-06944	
14	9583	National Donate Life Month, 2017	March 31, 2017	April 5, 2017	82 FR 16711	2017-06945	
15	9584	National Financial Capability Month, 2017	March 31, 2017	April 5, 2017	82 FR 16713	2017-06946	
16	9585	National Sexual Assault Awareness and Prevention Month, 2017	March 31, 2017	April 5, 2017	82 FR 16715	2017-06948	
17	9586	World Autism Awareness Day, 2017	March 31, 2017	April 5, 2017	82 FR 16717	2017-06949	
18	9587	National Crime Victims' Rights Week, 2017	April 3, 2017	April 6, 2017	82 FR 16889	2017-07065	
19	9588	Honoring the Memory of John Glenn	April 5, 2017	April 10, 2017	82 FR 17377	2017-07332	
20	9589	Education and Sharing Day, U.S.A., 2017	April 6, 2017	April 11, 2017	82 FR 17529	2017-07471	
21	9590	Pan American Day and Pan American Week, 2017	April 7, 2017	April 13, 2017	82 FR 17745	2017-07578	
22	9591	National Former Prisoner of War Recognition Day, 2017	April 7, 2017	April 13, 2017	82 FR 17747	2017-07580	
23	9592	National Park Week, 2017	April 14, 2017	April 19, 2017	82 FR 18545	2017-08071	
24	9593	National Volunteer Week, 2017	April 21, 2017	April 27, 2017	82 FR 19611	2017-08723	
25	9594	Days of Remembrance of Victims of the Holocaust, 2017	April 24, 2017	April 28, 2017	82 FR 20235	2017-08817	
26	9595	Asian American and Pacific Islander Heritage Month, 2017	April 28, 2017	May 3, 2017	82 FR 20795	2017-09073	
27	9596	Jewish American Heritage Month, 2017	April 28, 2017	May 3, 2017	82 FR 20797	2017-09074	
28	9597	National Foster Care Month, 2017	April 28, 2017	May 3, 2017	82 FR 20799	2017-09075	
29	9598	National Physical Fitness and Sports Month, 2017	April 28, 2017	May 3, 2017	82 FR 20801	2017-09076	
30	9599	Older Americans Month, 2017	April 28, 2017	May 3, 2017	82 FR 20803	2017-09077	
31	9600	National Charter Schools Week, 2017	April 28, 2017	May 3, 2017	82 FR 20805	2017-09078	
32	9601	Small Business Week, 2017	April 28, 2017	May 3, 2017	82 FR 20807	2017-09079	
33	9602	Loyalty Day, 2017	April 28, 2017	May 3, 2017	82 FR 20809	2017-09082	
34	9603	National Mental Health Awareness Month, 2017	May 1, 2017	May 4, 2017	82 FR 21103	2017-09209	
35	9604	Law Day, U.S.A., 2017	May 1, 2017	May 4, 2017	82 FR 21105	2017-09211	
36	9605	National Day of Prayer, 2017	May 4, 2017	May 9, 2017	82 FR 21673	2017-09570	
37	9606	National Hurricane Preparedness Week, 2017	May 5, 2017	May 10, 2017	82 FR 21901	2017-09632	
38	9607	Public Service Recognition Week, 2017	May 5, 2017	May 10, 2017	82 FR 21903	2017-09634	
39	9608	Military Spouse Day, 2017	May 12, 2017	May 17, 2017	82 FR 22729	2017-10159	
40	9609	Mother's Day, 2017	May 12, 2017	May 17, 2017	82 FR 22731	2017-10164	
41	9610	National Defense Transportation Day, 2017 and National Transportation Week, 2017	May 12, 2017	May 17, 2017	82 FR 22733	2017-10175	
42	9611	Peace Officers Memorial Day and Police Week, 2017	May 15, 2017	May 18, 2017	82 FR 22875	2017-10313	
43	9612	Emergency Medical Services Week, 2017	May 19, 2017	May 24, 2017	82 FR 23989	2017-10845	
44	9613	National Safe Boating Week, 2017	May 19, 2017	May 24, 2017	82 FR 23991	2017-10847	
45	9614	World Trade Week, 2017	May 19, 2017	May 24, 2017	82 FR 23993	2017-10848	
46	9615	Armed Forces Day, 2017	May 19, 2017	May 24, 2017	82 FR 23995	2017-10850	
47	9616	National Maritime Day, 2017	May 19, 2017	May 24, 2017	82 FR 23997	2017-10851	
48	9617	National Day of Prayer, Memorial Day, 2017	May 24, 2017	May 31, 2017	82 FR 24823	2017-11354	
49	9618	African-American Music Appreciation Month, 2017	May 31, 2017	June 5, 2017	82 FR 25921	2017-11773	
50	9619	Great Outdoors Month, 2017	May 31, 2017	June 5, 2017	82 FR 25923	2017-11774	
51	9620	National Caribbean-American Heritage Month, 2017	May 31, 2017	June 5, 2017	82 FR 25925	2017-11776	
52	9621	National Homeownership Month, 2017	May 31, 2017	June 5, 2017	82 FR 25927	2017-11778	
53	9622	National Ocean Month, 2017	May 31, 2017	June 5, 2017	82 FR 25929	2017-11779	
54	9623	Flag Day, 2017 and Flag Week, 2017	June 14, 2017	June 19, 2017	82 FR 27963	2017-12900	
55	9624	Father's Day, 2017	June 16, 2017	June 21, 2017	82 FR 28389	2017-13116	
56	9625	Expanding the Generalized System of Preferences Pursuant to sections 501 and 503(a)(1)(A) of the Trade Act of 1974, 2017	June 29, 2017	June 30, 2017	82 FR 30711	2017-14063	
57	9626	Captive Nations Week, 2017	July 14, 2017	July 19, 2017	82 FR 33437	2017-15339	
58	9627	Made in America Day, 2017 and Made in America Week, 2017	July 17, 2017	July 20, 2017	82 FR 33769	2017-15440	
59	9628	27th Anniversary of the Americans with Disabilities Act	July 25, 2017	July 31, 2017	82 FR 35435	2017-16145	
60	9629	National Korean War Veterans Armistice Day, 2017	July 26, 2017	August 1, 2017	82 FR 35881	2017-16327	
61	9630	National Employer Support of the Guard and Reserve Week, 2017	August 20, 2017	August 24, 2017	82 FR 40471	2017-18142	
62	9631	Women's Equality Day, 2017	August 25, 2017	August 30, 2017	82 FR 41317	2017-18541	
63	9632	National Preparedness Month, 2017	August 30, 2017	September 5, 2017	82 FR 42019	2017-18951	
64	9633	National Alcohol and Drug Addiction Recovery Month, 2017	August 31, 2017	September 6, 2017	82 FR 42231	2017-19046	
65	9634	National Day of Prayer for the Victims of Hurricane Harvey and for our National Response and Recovery Efforts	September 1, 2017	September 7, 2017	82 FR 42439	2017-19131	
66	9635	National Days of Prayer and Remembrance, 2017	September 8, 2017	September 14, 2017	82 FR 43293	2017-19739	
67	9636	Patriot Day, 2017	September 8, 2017	September 14, 2017	82 FR 43295	2017-19740	
68	9637	National Hispanic Heritage Month, 2017	September 13, 2017	September 18, 2017	82 FR 43661	2017-20003	
69	9638	National POW/MIA Recognition Day, 2017^{3}	September 13, 2017	September 18, 2017	82 FR 43663	2017-20004	
70	9639	Constitution Day and Citizenship Day, 2017 and Constitution Week, 2017	September 15, 2017	September 21, 2017	82 FR 44289	2017-20376	
71	9640	National Farm Safety and Health Week, 2017	September 15, 2017	September 21, 2017	82 FR 44291	2017-20377	
72	9641	National Gang Violence Prevention Week, 2017	September 15, 2017	September 21, 2017	82 FR 44293	2017-20378	
73	9642	National Historically Black Colleges and Universities Week, 2017	September 15, 2017	September 21, 2017	82 FR 44295	2017-20379	
74	9643	Prescription Opioid and Heroin Epidemic Awareness Week, 2017	September 15, 2017	September 21, 2017	82 FR 44297	2017-20380	
75	9644	Gold Star Mother's and Family's Day, 2017	September 23, 2017	September 27, 2017	82 FR 45159	2017-20895	
76	9645	Enhancing Vetting Capabilities and Processes for Detecting Attempted Entry Into the United States by Terrorists or Other Public-Safety Threats^{4} ^{5}	September 24, 2017	September 27, 2017	82 FR 45161	2017-20899	
77	9646	National Disability Employment Awareness Month, 2017	September 29, 2017	October 4, 2017	82 FR 46353	2017-21549	
78	9647	National Breast Cancer Awareness Month, 2017	September 29, 2017	October 4, 2017	82 FR 46355	2017-21550	
79	9648	National Cyber Security Awareness Month, 2017	September 29, 2017	October 4, 2017	82 FR 46357	2017-21551	
80	9649	National Domestic Violence Awareness Month, 2017	September 30, 2017	October 4, 2017	82 FR 46359	2017-21552	
81	9650	Child Health Day, 2017	September 30, 2017	October 4, 2017	82 FR 46361	2017-21554	
82	9651	Honoring the Victims of the Tragedy in Las Vegas, Nevada	October 2, 2017	October 5, 2017	82 FR 46653	2017-21720	
83	9652	German-American Day, 2017	October 6, 2017	October 11, 2017	82 FR 47361	2017-22173	
84	9653	Fire Prevention Week, 2017	October 6, 2017	October 13, 2017	82 FR 47943	2017-22417	
85	9654	National School Lunch Week, 2017	October 6, 2017	October 13, 2017	82 FR 47945	2017-22419	
86	9655	National Manufacturing Day, 2017	October 6, 2017	October 13, 2017	82 FR 47947	2017-22420	
87	9656	Columbus Day, 2017	October 6, 2017	October 13, 2017	82 FR 47949	2017-22423	
88	9657	Leif Erikson Day, 2017	October 6, 2017	October 13, 2017	82 FR 47951	2017-22424	
89	9658	General Pulaski Memorial Day, 2017	October 10, 2017	October 16, 2017	82 FR 48191	2017-22546	
90	9659	National Energy Awareness Month, 2017	October 12, 2017	October 17, 2017	82 FR 48383	2017-22676	
91	9660	National Character Counts Week, 2017	October 13, 2017	October 20, 2017	82 FR 48749	2017-22930	
92	9661	National Forest Products Week, 2017	October 13, 2017	October 20, 2017	82 FR 48751	2017-22936	
93	9662^{6}	Blind Americans Equality Day, 2017	October 13, 2017	October 20, 2017	82 FR 48753	2017-22938	
94	9663	National Minority Enterprise Development Week, 2017	October 20, 2017	October 26, 2017	82 FR 49735	2017-23525	
95	9664	United Nations Day, 2017	October 24, 2017	October 27, 2017	82 FR 50053	2017-23622	
96	9665	Critical Infrastructure Security and Resilience Month, 2017	October 31, 2017	November 6, 2017	82 FR 51535	2017-24278	
97	9666	National Adoption Month, 2017	October 31, 2017	November 6, 2017	82 FR 51537	2017-24289	
98	9667	National Entrepreneurship Month, 2017	October 31, 2017	November 6, 2017	82 FR 51539	2017-24293	
99	9668	National Family Caregivers Month, 2017	October 31, 2017	November 6, 2017	82 FR 51541	2017-24294	
100	9669	National Native American Heritage Month, 2017	October 31, 2017	November 6, 2017	82 FR 51543	2017-24295	
101	9670	National Veterans and Military Families Month, 2017^{7}	November 1, 2017	November 6, 2017	82 FR 51547	2017-24299	
102	9671	Honoring the Victims of the Sutherland Springs, Texas Shooting	November 5, 2017	November 8, 2017	82 FR 51965	2017-24463	
103	9672	Veterans Day, 2017^{7}	November 7, 2017	November 13, 2017	82 FR 52641	2017-24689	
104	9673	World Freedom Day, 2017	November 8, 2017	November 14, 2017	82 FR 52821	2017-24807	
105	9674	Commemorating the 50th Anniversary of the Vietnam War	November 10, 2017	November 17, 2017	82 FR 55025	2017-25164	
106	9675	American Education Week, 2017	November 10, 2017	November 20, 2017	82 FR 55301	2017-25242	
107	9676	National Apprenticeship Week, 2017	November 10, 2017	November 20, 2017	82 FR 55303	2017-25244	
108	9677	National Family Week, 2017^{8}	November 17, 2017	November 22, 2017	82 FR 55719	2017-25492	
109	9678	National Day of Thanksgiving, 2017^{9}	November 17, 2017	November 22, 2017	82 FR 55721	2017-25497	
110	9679	National Impaired Driving Prevention Month, 2017	November 30, 2017	December 5, 2017	82 FR 57533	2017-26355	
111	9680	World AIDS Day, 2017	November 30, 2017	December 5, 2017	82 FR 57535	2017-26358	
112	9681	Modifying the Bears Ears National Monument (Proclamation 9558) ^{10}	December 4, 2017	December 8, 2017	82 FR 58081	2017-26709	
113	9682	Modifying the Grand Staircase–Escalante National Monument (Proclamation 6920) ^{10}	December 4, 2017	December 8, 2017	82 FR 58089	2017-26714	
114	9683	Recognizing Jerusalem as the Capital of the State of Israel and Relocating the United States Embassy to Israel to Jerusalem	December 6, 2017	December 11, 2017	82 FR 58331	2017-26832	
115	9684	National Pearl Harbor Remembrance Day, 2017	December 7, 2017	December 12, 2017	82 FR 58531	2017-26948	
116	9685	Human Rights Day, Bill of Rights Day, and Human Rights Week, 2017	December 8, 2017	December 13, 2017	82 FR 58699	2017-27033	
117	9686	Wright Brothers Day, 2017	December 15, 2017	December 21, 2017	82 FR 60671	2017-27716	
118	9687	To Take Certain Actions under the African Growth and Opportunity Act and for Other Purposes	December 22, 2017	December 27, 2017	82 FR 61413	2017-28144	

== See also ==
- List of proclamations by Donald Trump (2018)
- List of proclamations by Donald Trump (2019)
- List of proclamations by Donald Trump (2020-21)
- List of proclamations by Donald Trump (2025)
