= Lists of proclamations by Donald Trump =

The president of the United States may take any of several kinds of executive actions.

Executive orders are issued to help officers and agencies of the executive branch manage the operations within the federal government itself. Presidential memoranda are closely related, and have the force of law on the Executive Branch, but are generally considered less prestigious. Presidential memoranda do not have an established process for issuance, and unlike executive orders, they are not numbered. A presidential determination results in an official policy or position of the executive branch of the United States government. A presidential proclamation is a statement issued by a president on a matter of public policy, under specific authority granted to the president by Congress, typically on a matter of widespread interest. Administrative orders are signed documents such as notices, letters, and orders, that can be issued to conduct administrative operations of the federal government. A presidential notice or a presidential sequestration order can also be issued.

Donald Trump signed a total of 570 proclamations from January 2017 to January 2021.
View source data.
Cumulative number of proclamations signed by Donald Trump

== Presidential proclamations ==
=== First presidency ===
- List of proclamations by Donald Trump (2017)
- List of proclamations by Donald Trump (2018)
- List of proclamations by Donald Trump (2019)
- List of proclamations by Donald Trump (2020–21)

=== Second presidency ===
- List of proclamations by Donald Trump (2025)
- List of proclamations by Donald Trump (2026)

=== Notes ===
1. National security directives are generally highly classified and are not executive orders. However, in an unprecedented move, the Trump administration ordered their national security directives to be published in the Federal Register.
2. National Security and Homeland Security Presidential Directives address continuity of government in the event of a "catastrophic emergency" disrupting the U.S. population, economy, environment, infrastructure and government policy.
