= List of proclamations by Donald Trump (2026) =

United States presidents issue presidential proclamations (in addition to other executive actions) to make statements on issues of public policy.

As of January 20, 2026, Donald Trump has signed a total of 118 presidential proclamations during his second term, since January 2025.

== Presidential proclamations ==
Relative no.	Absolute no.	Title / description	Date signed	Date published	FR citation	FR doc. number	Ref.
1	11001	Adjusting Imports of Processed Critical Minerals and Their Derivative Products into the United States	January 14, 2025	January 20, 2026	91 FR 2439	2026–01045	
2	11002	Adjusting Imports of Semiconductors, Semiconductor Manufacturing Equipment, and Their Derivative Products Into the United States	January 14, 2025	January 20, 2026	91 FR 2443	2026–01052	

== See also ==
- List of proclamations by Donald Trump (2017)
- List of proclamations by Donald Trump (2018)
- List of proclamations by Donald Trump (2019)
- List of proclamations by Donald Trump (2020–21)
- List of proclamations by Donald Trump (2025)
