= List of proclamations by Donald Trump (2019) =

The president of the United States may take any of several kinds of executive actions.

Executive orders are issued to help officers and agencies of the executive branch manage the operations within the federal government itself. Presidential memoranda are closely related, and have the force of law on the Executive Branch, but are generally considered less prestigious. Presidential memoranda do not have an established process for issuance, and unlike executive orders, they are not numbered. A presidential determination results in an official policy or position of the executive branch of the United States government. A presidential proclamation is a statement issued by a president on a matter of public policy, under specific authority granted to the president by Congress, typically on a matter of widespread interest. Administrative orders are signed documents such as notices, letters, and orders, that can be issued to conduct administrative operations of the federal government. A presidential notice or a presidential sequestration order can also be issued.

== Presidential proclamations ==
Relative no.	Absolute no.	Title / description	Date signed	Date published	FR citation	FR doc. number	Ref.
267	9836	Religious Freedom Day, 2019	January 15, 2019	January 22, 2019	84 FR 195	2019-00092	
268	9837	National School Choice Week, 2019	January 18, 2019	January 25, 2019	84 FR 361	2019-00220	
269	9838	National Sanctity of Human Life Day, 2019	January 18, 2019	January 25, 2019	84 FR 363	2019-00221	
270	9839	Martin Luther King Jr., Federal Holiday, 2019	January 18, 2019	January 25, 2019	84 FR 365	2019-00222	
271	9840	American Heart Month, 2019	January 31, 2019	February 6, 2019	84 FR 2043	2019-01482	
272	9841	National African American History Month, 2019	January 31, 2019	February 6, 2019	84 FR 2045	2019-01484	
273	9842	Addressing Mass Migration Through the Southern Border of the United States	February 7, 2019	February 12, 2019	84 FR 3665	2019-02303	
274	9843	Death of John David Dingell Jr.	February 8, 2019	February 13, 2019	84 FR 3965	2019-02478	
275	9844	Declaring a National Emergency Concerning the Southern Border of the United States	February 15, 2019	February 20, 2019	84 FR 4949	2019-03011	
276	9845	American Red Cross Month, 2019	March 1, 2019	March 6, 2019	84 FR 8237	2019-04201	
277	9846	Irish-American Heritage Month, 2019	March 1, 2019	March 6, 2019	84 FR 8239	2019-04202	
278	9847	Women's History Month, 2019	March 1, 2019	March 6, 2019	84 FR 8241	2019-04206	
279	9848	National Consumer Protection Week, 2019	March 1, 2019	March 8, 2019	84 FR 8583	2019-04432	
280	9849	National Agriculture Day, 2019	March 13, 2019	March 19, 2019	84 FR 9935	2019-05277	
281	9850	National Poison Prevention Week, 2019	March 15, 2019	March 20, 2019	84 FR 10397	2019-05472	
282	9851	Greek Independence Day, 2019	March 18, 2019	March 21, 2019	84 FR 10399	2019-05541	
283	9852	Recognizing the Golan Heights as the Part of the State of Israel	March 25, 2019	March 28, 2019	84 FR 11875	2019-06199	
284	9853	Cancer Control Month, 2019	March 29, 2019	April 4, 2019	84 FR 13487	2019-06806	
285	9854	National Child Abuse Prevention Month, 2019	March 29, 2019	April 4, 2019	84 FR 13489	2019-06807	
286	9855	National Donate Life Month, 2019	March 29, 2019	April 4, 2019	84 FR 13491	2019-06808	
287	9856	National Sexual Assault Awareness and Prevention Month, 2019	March 29, 2019	April 4, 2019	84 FR 13493	2019-06809	
288	9857	Second Chance Month, 2019	March 29, 2019	April 4, 2019	84 FR 13495	2019-06810	
289	9858	World Autism Awareness Day, 2019	April 1, 2019	April 5, 2019	84 FR 13793	2019-06953	
290	9859	National Crime Victims' Rights Week, 2019	April 5, 2019	April 10, 2019	84 FR 14583	2019-07259	
291	9860	National Volunteer Week, 2019	April 5, 2019	April 10, 2019	84 FR 14585	2019-07261	
292	9861	National Former Prisoner of War Recognition Day, 2019	April 8, 2019	April 12, 2019	84 FR 15081	2019-07525	
293	9862	Pan American Day and Pan American Week, 2019	April 12, 2019	April 18, 2019	84 FR 16187	2019-07912	
294	9863	Education and Sharing Day, U.S.A., 2019	April 15, 2019	April 19, 2019	84 FR 16379	2019-08064	
295	9864	National Park Week, 2019	April 19, 2019	April 24, 2019	84 FR 17339	2019-08407	
296	9865	World Intellectual Property Day, 2019	April 25, 2019	May 2, 2019	84 FR 18695	2019-09105	
297	9866	Days of Remembrance of Victims of the Holocaust, 2019	April 26, 2019	May 2, 2019	84 FR 18969	2019-09156	
298	9867	Asian American and Pacific Islander Heritage Month, 2019	April 30, 2019	May 6, 2019	84 FR 19683	2019-09313	
299	9868	Jewish American Heritage Month, 2019	April 30, 2019	May 6, 2019	84 FR 19685	2019-09314	
300	9869	National Foster Care Month, 2019	April 30, 2019	May 6, 2019	84 FR 19687	2019-09315	
301	9870	National Physical Fitness and Sports Month, 2019	April 30, 2019	May 6, 2019	84 FR 19689	2019-09316	
302	9871	Older Americans Month, 2019	April 30, 2019	May 6, 2019	84 FR 19691	2019-09325	
303	9872	Law Day, U.S.A., 2019	April 30, 2019	May 6, 2019	84 FR 19693	2019-09326	
304	9873	Loyalty Day, 2019	April 30, 2019	May 6, 2019	84 FR 19695	2019-09327	
305	9874	National Day of Prayer, 2019	April 30, 2019	May 6, 2019	84 FR 19697	2019-09328	
306	9875	National Mental Health Awareness Month, 2019	May 1, 2019	May 5, 2019	84 FR 19851	2019-09401	
307	9876	National Hurricane Preparedness Week, 2019	May 3, 2019	May 9, 2019	84 FR 20529	2019-09755	
308	9877	National Small Business Week, 2019	May 3, 2019	May 9, 2019	84 FR 20531	2019-09759	
309	9878	Public Service Recognition Week, 2019	May 3, 2019	May 9, 2019	84 FR 20533	2019-09760	
310	9879	Missing and Murdered American Indians and Alaska Natives Awareness Day, 2019	May 3, 2019	May 9, 2019	84 FR 20535	2019-09761	
311	9880	Addressing Mass Migration Through the Southern Border of the United States	May 8, 2019	May 13, 2019	84 FR 21229	2019-09992	
312	9881	Military Spouse Day, 2019	May 9, 2019	May 14, 2019	84 FR 21685	2019-10130	
313	9882	National Charter Schools Week, 2019	May 10, 2019	May 15, 2019	84 FR 22039	2019-10255	
314	9883	National Defense Transportation Day and National Transportation Week, 2019	May 10, 2019	May 15, 2019	84 FR 22041	2019-10257	
315	9884	Peace Officers Memorial Day and Police Week, 2019	May 10, 2019	May 15, 2019	84 FR 22043	2019-10262	
316	9885	Mother's Day, 2019	May 10, 2019	May 15, 2019	84 FR 22045	2019-10263	
317	9886	Adjusting Imports of Steel Into the United States	May 16, 2019	May 21, 2019	84 FR 23421	2019-10759	
318	9887	To Modify the List of Beneficiary Developing Countries Under the Trade Act of 1974	May 16, 2019	May 21, 2019	84 FR 23425	2019-10761	
319	9888	Adjusting Imports of Automobiles and Automobile Parts Into the United States	May 17, 2019	May 21, 2019	84 FR 23433	2019-10774	
320	9889	National Safe Boating Week, 2019	May 17, 2019	May 22, 2019	84 FR 23695	2019-10862	
321	9890	Emergency Medical Services Week, 2019	May 17, 2019	May 22, 2019	84 FR 23697	2019-10865	
322	9891	World Trade Week, 2019	May 17, 2019	May 22, 2019	84 FR 23699	2019-10866	
323	9892	Armed Forces Day, 2019	May 17, 2019	May 22, 2019	84 FR 23701	2019-10867	
324	9893	Adjusting Imports of Aluminum Into the United States	May 19, 2019	May 23, 2019	84 FR 23983	2019-10999	
325	9894	Adjusting Imports of Steel Into the United States	May 19, 2019	May 23, 2019	84 FR 23987	2019-11002	
326	9895	National Maritime Day, 2019	May 20, 2019	May 24, 2019	84 FR 24361	2019-11110	
327	9896	Prayer for Peace, Memorial Day, 2019	May 24, 2019	May 30, 2019	84 FR 24973	2019-11413	
328	9897	African-American Music Appreciation Month, 2019	May 31, 2019	June 5, 2019	84 FR 26313	2019-11976	
329	9898	Great Outdoors Month, 2019	May 31, 2019	June 5, 2019	84 FR 26315	2019-11977	
330	9899	National Caribbean-American Heritage Month, 2019	May 31, 2019	June 5, 2019	84 FR 26317	2019-11980	
331	9900	National Homeownership Month, 2019	May 31, 2019	June 5, 2019	84 FR 26319	2019-11984	
332	9901	National Ocean Month, 2019	May 31, 2019	June 5, 2019	84 FR 26321	2019-11985	
333	9902	To Modify the List of Beneficiary Developing Countries Under the Trade Act of 1974	May 31, 2019	June 5, 2019	84 FR 26323	2019-11986	
334	9903	Honoring the Victims of the Tragedy in Virginia Beach, Virginia	June 1, 2019	June 7, 2019	84 FR 26737	2019-12233	
335	9904	National Day of Remembrance of the 75th Anniversary of D-Day	June 6, 2019	June 12, 2019	84 FR 27501	2019-12552	
336	9905	Flag Day and National Flag Week, 2019	June 7, 2019	June 13, 2019	84 FR 27699	2019-12697	
337	9906	Father's Day, 2019	June 14, 2019	June 19, 2019	84 FR 28709	2019-13173	
338	9907	Pledge to America's Workers Month, 2019	July 1, 2019	July 5, 2019	84 FR 32013	2019-14472	
339	9908	Made in America Day and Made in America Week, 2019	July 14, 2019	July 18, 2019	84 FR 34255	2019-15488	
340	9909	Death of John Paul Stevens	July 17, 2019	July 22, 2019	84 FR 35283	2019-15679	
341	9910	Captive Nations Week, 2019	July 19, 2019	July 25, 2019	84 FR 35961	2019-15989	
342	9911	50th Anniversary Observance of the Apollo 11 Lunar Landing	July 19, 2019	July 25, 2019	84 FR 35963	2019-15991	
343	9912	Anniversary of the Americans with Disabilities Act, 2019	July 25, 2019	July 31, 2019	84 FR 37551	2019-16463	
344	9913	National Korean War Veterans Armistice Day, 2019	July 26, 2019	August 1, 2019	84 FR 37563	2019-16558	
345	9914	Honoring the Victims of the Tragedies in El Paso, Texas, and Dayton, Ohio	August 4, 2019	August 8, 2019	84 FR 38847	2019-17118	
346	9915	National Employer Support of the Guard and Reserve Week, 2019	August 16, 2019	August 21, 2019	84 FR 43473	2019-18138	
347	9916	Women's Equality Day, 2019	August 23, 2019	August 28, 2019	84 FR 45055	2019-18684	
348	9917	National Alcohol and Drug Addiction Recovery Month, 2019	August 30, 2019	September 5, 2019	84 FR 46865	2019-19352	
349	9918	National Childhood Cancer Awareness Month, 2019	August 30, 2019	September 5, 2019	84 FR 46867	2019-19357	
350	9919	National Preparedness Month, 2019	August 30, 2019	September 5, 2019	84 FR 46869	2019-19365	
351	9920	Labor Day, 2019	August 30, 2019	September 5, 2019	84 FR 46871	2019-19366	
352	9921	National Days of Prayer and Remembrance, 2019	September 5, 2019	September 10, 2019	84 FR 47873	2019-19726	
353	9922	National Historically Black Colleges and Universities Week, 2019	September 6, 2019	September 12, 2019	84 FR 48223	2019-19928	
354	9923	Opioid Crisis Awareness Week, 2019	September 6, 2019	September 12, 2019	84 FR 48225	2019-19929	
355	9924	Minority Enterprise Development Week, 2019	September 9, 2019	September 13, 2019	84 FR 48541	2019-20053	
356	9925	Patriot Day, 2019	September 10, 2019	September 16, 2019	84 FR 48547	2019-20117	
357	9926	National Farm Safety and Health Week, 2019	September 13, 2019	September 17, 2019	84 FR 49003	2019-20246	
358	9927	National Hispanic Heritage Month, 2019	September 13, 2019	September 18, 2019	84 FR 49185	2019-20363	
359	9928	National Gang Violence Prevention Week, 2019	September 13, 2019	September 18, 2019	84 FR 49187	2019-20365	
360	9929	Constitution Day, Citizenship Day, and Constitution Week, 2019	September 16, 2019	September 20, 2019	84 FR 49629	2019-20619	
361	9930	National POW/MIA Recognition Day, 2019	September 19, 2019	September 25, 2019	84 FR 50709	2019-20980	
362	9931	Suspension of Entry as Immigrants and Nonimmigrants of Persons Responsible for Policies or Actions That Threaten Venezuela's Democratic Institutions	September 25, 2019	September 30, 2019	84 FR 51931	2019-21398	
363	9932	Suspension of Entry as Immigrants and Nonimmigrants of Senior Officials of the Government of Iran	September 25, 2019	September 30, 2019	84 FR 51935	2019-21400	
364	9933	National Domestic Violence Awareness Month, 2019	September 27, 2019	October 2, 2019	84 FR 52737	2019-21616	
365	9934	Gold Star Mother's and Family's Day, 2019	September 27, 2019	October 2, 2019	84 FR 52739	2019-21617	
366	9935	National Hunting and Fishing Day, 2019	September 27, 2019	October 2, 2019	84 FR 52741	2019-21626	
367	9936	National Breast Cancer Awareness Month, 2019	September 30, 2019	October 3, 2019	84 FR 52983	2019-21760	
368	9937	National Cybersecurity Awareness Month, 2019	September 30, 2019	October 3, 2019	84 FR 52985	2019-21761	
369	9938	National Disability Employment Awareness Month, 2019	September 30, 2019	October 3, 2019	84 FR 52987	2019-21762	
370	9939	National Energy Awareness Month, 2019	September 30, 2019	October 3, 2019	84 FR 52989	2019-21763	
371	9940	National Substance Abuse Prevention Month, 2019	September 30, 2019	October 3, 2019	84 FR 52991	2019-21766	
372	9941	National Manufacturing Day, 2019	October 3, 2019	October 8, 2019	84 FR 53983	2019-22159	
373	9942	Fire Prevention Week, 2019	October 4, 2019	October 9, 2019	84 FR 53985	2019-22112	
374	9943	German-American Day, 2019	October 4, 2019	October 9, 2019	84 FR 53987	2019-22115	
375	9944	Child Health Day, 2019	October 4, 2019	October 9, 2019	84 FR 53989	2019-22220	
376	9945	Suspension of Entry of Immigrants Who Will Financially Burden the United States Healthcare System, in Order To Protect the Availability of Healthcare Benefits for Americans	October 4, 2019	October 9, 2019	84 FR 53991	2019-22225	
377	9946	Leif Erikson Day, 2019	October 8, 2019	October 11, 2019	84 FR 54763	2019-22444	
378	9947	General Pulaski Memorial Day, 2019	October 10, 2019	October 16, 2019	84 FR 55485	2019-22745	
379	9948	National School Lunch Week, 2019	October 11, 2019	October 17, 2019	84 FR 55489	2019-22797	
380	9949	Columbus Day, 2019	October 11, 2019	October 17, 2019	84 FR 55491	2019-22807	
381	9950	Blind Americans Equality Day, 2019	October 11, 2019	October 17, 2019	84 FR 55493	2019-22809	
382	9951	Death of Elijah E. Cummings	October 17, 2019	October 22, 2019	84 FR 56367	2019-23124	
383	9952	National Character Counts Week, 2019	October 18, 2019	October 24, 2019	84 FR 57305	2019-23434	
384	9953	National Forest Products Week, 2019	October 18, 2019	October 24, 2019	84 FR 57307	2019-23435	
385	9954	United Nations Day, 2019	October 23, 2019	October 28, 2019	84 FR 57601	2019-23604	
386	9955	To Modify Duty-Free Treatment Under the Generalized System of Preferences and for Other Purposes	October 25, 2019	October 31, 2019	84 FR 58567	2019-24008	
387	9956	Critical Infrastructure Security and Resilience Month, 2019	October 31, 2019	November 5, 2019	84 FR 59693	2019-24274	
388	9957	National Adoption Month, 2019	October 31, 2019	November 5, 2019	84 FR 59697	2019-24275	
389	9958	National American History and Founders Month, 2019	October 31, 2019	November 5, 2019	84 FR 59699	2019-24277	
390	9959	National Entrepreneurship Month, 2019	October 31, 2019	November 5, 2019	84 FR 59701	2019-24279	
391	9960	National Family Caregivers Month, 2019	October 31, 2019	November 5, 2019	84 FR 59703	2019-24280	
392	9961	National Native American Heritage Month, 2019	October 31, 2019	November 5, 2019	84 FR 59705	2019-24281	
393	9962	National Veterans and Military Families Month, 2019	October 31, 2019	November 5, 2019	84 FR 59707	2019-24285	
394	9963	Veterans Day, 2019	November 7, 2019	November 13, 2019	84 FR 61811	2019-24793	
395	9964	National Apprenticeship Week, 2019	November 8, 2019	November 14, 2019	84 FR 62427	2019-24875	
396	9965	World Freedom Day, 2019	November 8, 2019	November 14, 2019	84 FR 62429	2019-24876	
397	9967	American Education Week, 2019	November 15, 2019	November 20, 2019	84 FR 64187	2019-25345	
398	9968	National Family Week, 2019	November 22, 2019	November 27, 2019	84 FR 65257	2019-25886	
399	9968	Thanksgiving Day, 2019	November 27, 2019	December 4, 2019	84 FR 66281	2019-26283	
400	9969	National Impaired Driving Prevention Month, 2019	November 27, 2019	December 4, 2019	84 FR 66283	2019-26284	
401	9970	World AIDS Day, 2019	November 27, 2019	December 4, 2019	84 FR 66285	2019-26285	
402	9971	National Pearl Harbor Remembrance Day, 2019	December 6, 2019	December 11, 2019	84 FR 67657	2019-26779	
403	9972	Human Rights Day, Bill of Rights Day, and Human Rights Week, 2019	December 6, 2019	December 11, 2019	84 FR 68323	2019-27106	
404	9973	Wright Brothers Day, 2019	December 16, 2019	December 19, 2019	84 FR 69617	2019-27525	
405	9974	To Take Certain Actions Under the African Growth and Opportunity Act and for Other Purposes	December 26, 2019	December 30, 2019	84 FR 72187	2019-28285	
406	9975	National Slavery and Human Trafficking Prevention Month, 2020	December 31, 2019	January 6, 2020	85 FR 633	2020-00065	

== See also ==
- List of proclamations by Donald Trump (2017)
- List of proclamations by Donald Trump (2018)
- List of proclamations by Donald Trump (2020-21)
- List of proclamations by Donald Trump (2025)
