= September 11 National Day of Service =

Remembrance event in the United States

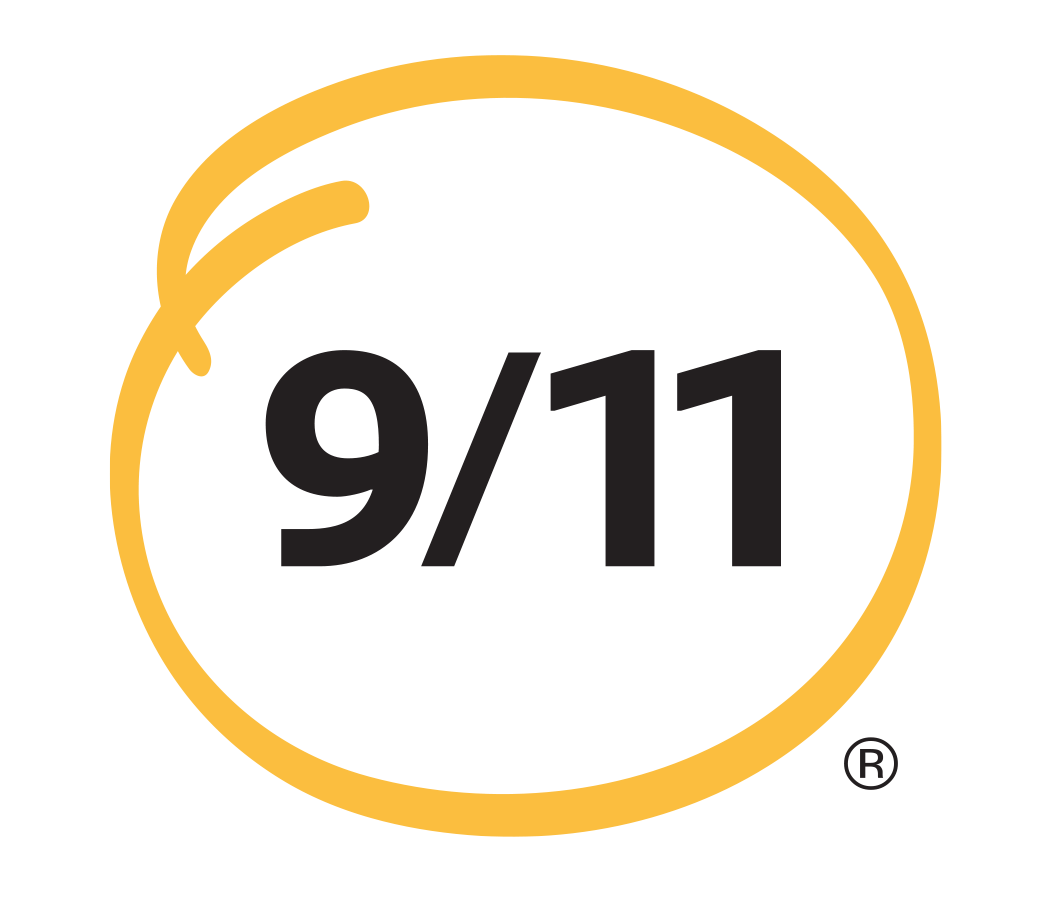
- Date: September 11th
- Frequency: Annual
- Organized by: 9/11 Day
- Website: 911day.org

The September 11 National Day of Service and Remembrance or 9/11 Day is a federally-recognized National Day of Service that happens in the United States on the anniversary of the September 11, 2001 terrorist attacks. Originally founded by the 9/11 nonprofit 9/11 Day, the September 11 National Day of Service and Remembrance later became federally recognized and authorized as a Day of Service under passage of the Edward M. Kennedy Serve America Act, which was adopted on a bipartisan basis by the U.S. Congress in 2009. Later that year, President Barack Obama amended the Patriot Day Presidential Proclamation, first established by President George W. Bush, officially designating September 11 as a National Day of Service and Remembrance. Surveys conducted by 9/11 Day claim that approximately 35 million Americans observe 9/11 Day by engaging in some form of charitable service, making 9/11 Day the largest annual day of charitable service in the United States. The September 11 National Day of Service and Remembrance and Martin Luther King, Jr.'s birthday, are the only Days of Service officially recognized and established under federal law and Presidential Proclamation.

== Purpose ==
According to the nonprofit 9/11 Day, the purpose of the September 11 National Day of Service and Remembrance is to transform the anniversary of 9/11 from a day of tragedy into a day of doing good. "We wanted to make sure the terrorists didn't have the last word in forever defining for generations to how America would remember and observe 9/11," said 9/11 Day co-founder David Paine. "We wanted instead to honor the victims and those who rose in service by keeping alive the spirit of unity and service that arose in the immediate aftermath of the September 11 attacks."

== History ==
The idea of turning September 11 into an annual day of service was originally conceived in early 2002 by David Paine, at that time a public relations executive who had grown up in New York City. Later that year, Paine was joined by his friend Jay Winuk to form the nonprofit group One Day's Pay. Winuk's younger brother, Glenn J. Winuk, an attorney at Holland & Knight LLP and a volunteer firefighter affiliated with the Jericho Fire Department, was killed in the line of duty during the rescue efforts on September 11. He died when the World Trade Center South Tower collapsed, and his remains were recovered approximately six months later in the South Tower lobby area alongside other first responders, with a medic kit he had borrowed at the scene.

In 2007, the organization formally changed its name to MyGoodDeed. In 2011, in observance of the tenth anniversary of the September 11 attacks, MyGoodDeed joined with other national service organizations to help organize what was then considered the largest day of charitable service in U.S. history, with more than 30 million Americans participating, according to research conducted by Horizon Consumer Science on behalf of the organization.

In 2023, the nonprofit adopted the name 9/11 Day to align its identity more directly with the September 11 National Day of Service and Remembrance, which it leads. Today, 9/11 Day continues to engage more than 30 million Americans annually in charitable service, including volunteering, donations to charities, and simple good deeds.

== Activities ==
Activities by volunteers on this federally-recognized National Day of Service and Remembrance have traditionally happened largely on a grassroots level across the nation, through service projects organized by local nonprofits, employers, and faith groups and others. Many people share their plans and messages through social media on 9/11 using the hashtag #911Day. Additionally many schools and students now engage in service-related activities as part of lessons about the history of 9/11 Day. Beginning in 2016, MyGoodDeed started organizing its own, large-scale service projects in major cities. These events are known as 9/11 Day Meal Packs, where volunteers from local organizations and companies spend time during the day on 9/11 assembling non-perishable meals for people who are food insecure. Over 20,000 volunteers participate to provide more than 6 million meals for those in need.

== See also ==
- Global Youth Service Day
- Good Deeds Day
- Mandela Day
- MLK Day of Service
- Mitzvah Day
- National Volunteer Week (USA)
