= Minority Enterprise Development Week =

National Minority Enterprise Development Week
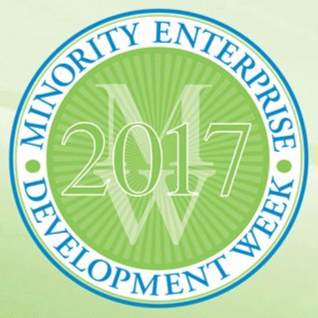
- Official Logo for National MED Week 2017
- Official name: National Minority Enterprise Development Week
- Also called: National MED Week, MED Week
- Observed by: United States
- Type: National
- Date: October
- Frequency: Yearly

National Minority Enterprise Development Week, also known as National MED Week, is a special week in the month of October, observed in the United States to recognize and celebrate the achievements and contributions of the minority business enterprise community.

== History ==
President Ronald Reagan first recognized National MED Week in 1983. Each year, every President of the United States officially recognizes National MED Week through a Presidential Proclamation. The week is formally celebrated each year by the Minority Business Development Agency, a U.S. government agency housed within the U.S. Department of Commerce.

== Observation by President Trump ==
President Donald Trump became the first President of the United States to formally recognize minority-owned businesses in the Oval Office during National MED Week, when he welcomed winners of the National MED Week Awards on October 24, 2017. On October 20, 2017, President Trump issued a proclamation to officially designate October 22 through October 28, 2017 as National Minority Enterprise Development Week.

== Awards ==
The Minority Business Development Agency holds an awards ceremony each year during National MED Week to recognize the contributions of minority-owned businesses in a variety of industry categories. These awards include:

- Minority Business Enterprise of the Year
- Minority Construction Firm of the Year
- Minority Export Firm of the Year
- Minority Manufacturing Firm of the Year
- Minority Energy Firm of the Year
- Minority Technology Firm of the Year
- Minority Health Products and Services Firm of the Year
- Minority Marketing and Communications Firm of the Year
- Minority Professional Services Firm of the Year
- Abe Venable Legacy Award for Lifetime Achievement
- Access to Capital Award
- Advocate of the Year Award
- Distinguished Supplier Diversity Award
- Ronald H. Brown Leadership Award
