= List of proclamations by Donald Trump (2025) =

United States presidents issue presidential proclamations (in addition to other executive actions) to make statements on issues of public policy.

As of January 20, 2026, Donald Trump has signed a total of 118 presidential proclamations during his second term, since January 2025.

== Presidential proclamations ==
Relative no.	Absolute no.	Title / description	Date signed	Date published	FR citation	FR doc. number	Ref.
1	10885	Flying the Flag of the United States at Full- Staff on Inauguration Day	January 20, 2025	January 28, 2025	90 FR 8233	2025-01899	
2	10886	Declaring a National Emergency at the Southern Border of the United States	January 20, 2025	January 29, 2025	90 FR 8327	2025-01948	
3	10887	Granting Pardons and Commutation of Sentences for Certain Offenses Relating to the Events at or Near the United States Capitol on January 6, 2021	January 20, 2025	January 29, 2025	90 FR 8331	2025-01950	
4	10888	Guaranteeing the States Protection Against Invasion	January 20, 2025	January 29, 2025	90 FR 8333	2025-01951	
5	10889	National Day of Remembrance of the 80th Anniversary of the Liberation of Auschwitz, 2025	January 27, 2025	February 3, 2025	90 FR 8755	2025-02177	
6	10890	National Black History Month, 2025	January 31, 2025	February 5, 2025	90 FR 9061	2025-02343	
7	10891	National School Choice Week, 2025	January 31, 2025	February 5, 2025	90 FR 9063	2025-02344	
8	10892	American Heart Month, 2025	February 3, 2025	February 6, 2025	90 FR 9107	2025-02402	
9	10893	Career and Technical Education Month, 2025	February 3, 2025	February 6, 2025	90 FR 9109	2025-02404	
10	10894	Gulf of America Day, 2025	February 9, 2025	February 12, 2025	90 FR 9505	2025-02637	
11	10895	Adjusting Imports of Aluminum into the United States	February 10, 2025	February 18, 2025	90 FR 9807	2025-02832	
12	10896	Adjusting Imports of Steel into the United States	February 10, 2025	February 18, 2025	90 FR 9817	2025-02833	
13	10897	President George Washington's Birthday, 2025	February 17, 2025	February 25, 2025	90 FR 10575	2025-03132	
14	10898	80th Anniversary of the Battle of Iwo Jima	February 19, 2025	February 25, 2025	90 FR 10683	2025-03162	
15	10899	Irish-American Heritage Month, 2025	March 6, 2025	March 11, 2025	90 FR 10653	2025-03946	
16	10900	Women's History Month, 2025	March 6, 2025	March 11, 2025	90 FR 10655	2025-03947	
17	10901	National Consumer Protection Week, 2025	March 6, 2025	March 11, 2025	90 FR 10657	2025-03948	
18	10902	U.S. Hostage and Wrongful Detainee Day, 2025	March 9, 2025	March 12, 2025	90 FR 11889	2025-04105	
19	10903	Invocation of the Alien Enemies Act Regarding the Invasion of the United States by Tren de Aragua	March 14, 2025	March 20, 2025	90 FR 13033	2025-04865	
20	10904	National Agriculture Day, 2025	March 18, 2025	March 21, 2025	90 FR 13263	2025-04970	
21	10905	National Poison Prevention Week, 2025	March 18, 2025	March 21, 2025	90 FR 13265	2025-04972	
22	10906	250th Anniversary of Patrick Henry's "Give Me Liberty, Or Give Me Death!" Speech	March 20, 2025	March 25, 2025	90 FR 13551	2025-05150	
23	10907	Greek Independence Day: A National Day of Celebration of Greek and American Democracy, 2025	March 24, 2025	March 27, 2025	90 FR 13827	2025-05414	
24	10908	Adjusting Imports of Automobiles and Automobile Parts Into the United States	March 26, 2025	April 3, 2025	90 FR 14705	2025-05930	
25	10909	World Autism Awareness Day, 2025	April 1, 2025	April 7, 2025	90 FR 14897	2025-06026	
26	10910	Cancer Control Month, 2025	April 3, 2025	April 9, 2025	90 FR 15201	2025-06158	
27	10911	National Child Abuse Prevention Month, 2025	April 3, 2025	April 9, 2025	90 FR 15203	2025-06159	
28	10912	National Donate Life Month, 2025	April 3, 2025	April 9, 2025	90 FR 15205	2025-06160	
29	10913	National Sexual Assault Awareness and Prevention Month, 2025	April 3, 2025	April 9, 2025	90 FR 15207	2025-06161	
30	10914	Regulatory Relief for Certain Stationary Sources To Promote American Energy	April 8, 2025	April 21, 2025	90 FR 16777	2025-06936	
31	10915	National Crime Victims' Rights Week, 2025	April 9, 2025	April 22, 2025	90 FR 16785	2025-06960	
32	10916	Education and Sharing Day, U.S.A., 2025	April 9, 2025	April 22, 2025	90 FR 16787	2025-06961	
33	10917	National Former Prisoner of War Recognition Day, 2025	April 9, 2025	April 22, 2025	90 FR 16789	2025-06962	
34	10918	Unleashing American Commercial Fishing in the Pacific	April 17, 2025	April 22, 2025	90 FR 16987	2025-07060	
35	10919	250th Anniversary of the Battles of Lexington and Concord	April 17, 2025	April 22, 2025	90 FR 16991	2025-07061	
36	10920	Honoring the Memory of His Holiness Pope Francis	April 21, 2025	April 24, 2025	90 FR 17337	2025-07239	
37	10921	National Park Week, 2025	April 23, 2025	April 28, 2025	90 FR 17513	2025-07365	
38	10922	Days of Remembrance of Victims of the Holocaust, 2025	April 23, 2025	April 28, 2025	90 FR 17515	2025-07366	
39	10923	National Volunteer Week, 2025	April 23, 2025	April 28, 2025	90 FR 17517	2025-07367	
40	10924	World Intellectual Property Day, 2025	April 26, 2025	April 30, 2025	90 FR 17885	2025-07570	
41	10925	Amendments to Adjusting Imports of Automobiles and Automobile Parts Into the United States	April 29, 2025	May 2, 2025	90 FR 18889	2025-07833	
42	10926	418th Anniversary of the First Landing and the Raising of the Cape Henry Cross	April 29, 2025	May 2, 2025	90 FR 18905	2025-07834	
43	10927	National Fallen Firefighters Memorial Weekend, 2025	May 1, 2025	May 7, 2025	90 FR 19409	2025-08130	
44	10928	Loyalty Day and Law Day, U.S.A., 2025	May 1, 2025	May 7, 2025	90 FR 19411	2025-08131	
45	10929	National Day of Prayer, 2025	May 1, 2025	May 7, 2025	90 FR 19413	2025-08132	
46	10930	National Mental Health Awareness Month, 2025	May 5, 2025	May 8, 2025	90 FR 19605	2025-08263	
47	10931	National Hurricane Preparedness Week, 2025	May 5, 2025	May 8, 2025	90 FR 19607	2025-08264	
48	10932	National Small Business Week, 2025	May 5, 2025	May 8, 2025	90 FR 19609	2025-08265	
49	10933	National Foster Care Month, 2025	May 7, 2025	May 12, 2025	90 FR 20227	2025-08487	
50	10934	Victory Day for World War II, 2025	May 7, 2025	May 12, 2025	90 FR 20229	2025-08488	
51	10935	Establishing Project Homecoming	May 9, 2025	May 14, 2025	90 FR 20357	2025-08673	
52	10936	Military Spouse Day, 2025	May 9, 2025	May 14, 2025	90 FR 20359	2025-08679	
53	10937	Mother's Day, 2025	May 9, 2025	May 14, 2025	90 FR 20361	2025-08680	
54	10938	Peace Officers Memorial Day and Police Week, 2025	May 12, 2025	May 21, 2025	90 FR 21685	2025-09229	
55	10939	Asian American and Pacific Islander Heritage Month, 2025	May 16, 2025	May 22, 2025	90 FR 21835	2025-09337	
56	10940	Jewish American Heritage Month, 2025	May 16, 2025	May 22, 2025	90 FR 21837	2025-09338	
57	10941	Armed Forces Day, 2025	May 16, 2025	May 22, 2025	90 FR 21839	2025-09341	
58	10942	National Maritime Day, 2025	May 22, 2025	May 28, 2025	90 FR 22579	2025-09785	
59	10943	National Physical Fitness and Sports Month, 2025	May 24, 2025	May 29, 2025	90 FR 22837	2025-09873	
60	10944	World Trade Week, 2025	May 24, 2025	May 29, 2025	90 FR 22839	2025-09874	
61	10945	Prayer for Peace, Memorial Day, 2025	May 24, 2025	May 29, 2025	90 FR 22841	2025-09875	
62	10946	101st Anniversary of the United States Border Patrol	May 27, 2025	June 2, 2025	90 FR 23265	2025-10070	
63	10947	Adjusting Imports of Aluminum and Steel Into the United States	June 3, 2025	June 9, 2025	90 FR 24199	2025-10524	
64	10948	Enhancing National Security by Addressing Risks at Harvard University	June 4, 2025	June 10, 2025	90 FR 24493	2025-10668	
65	10949	Restricting the Entry of Foreign Nationals To Protect the United States From Foreign Terrorists and Other National Security and Public Safety Threats	June 4, 2025	June 10, 2025	90 FR 24497	2025-10669	
66	10950	National Ocean Month, 2025	June 6, 2025	June 11, 2025	90 FR 24715	2025-10790	
67	10951	Flag Day and National Flag Week, 2025	June 13, 2025	June 18, 2025	90 FR 26179	2025-11361	
68	10952	250th Anniversary of the Founding of the United States Army	June 13, 2025	June 18, 2025	90 FR 26181	2025-11362	
69	10953	Father's Day, 2025	June 13, 2025	June 18, 2025	90 FR 26183	2025-11363	
70	10954	250th Anniversary of the Battle of Bunker Hill	June 17, 2025	June 23, 2025	90 FR 26725	2025-11555	
71	10955	160th Anniversary of the United States Secret Service, 2025	July 2, 2025	July 8, 2025	90 FR 30195	2025-12731	
72	10956	Regulatory Relief for Certain Stationary Sources To Further Promote American Energy	July 17, 2025	July 23, 2025	90 FR 34583	2025-13883	
73	10957	Regulatory Relief for Certain Stationary Sources To Promote American Chemical Manufacturing Security	July 17, 2025	July 23, 2025	90 FR 34587	2025-13890	
74	10958	Regulatory Relief for Certain Stationary Sources To Promote American Iron Ore Processing Security	July 17, 2025	July 23, 2025	90 FR 34743	2025-13923	
75	10959	Regulatory Relief for Certain Stationary Sources To Promote American Security With Respect to Sterile Medical Equipment	July 17, 2025	July 23, 2025	90 FR 34747	2025-13924	
76	10960	Captive Nations Week, 2025	July 25, 2025	August 1, 2025	90 FR 36369	2025-14691	
77	10961	Made in America Week, 2025	July 25, 2025	August 1, 2025	90 FR 36371	2025-14692	
78	10962	Adjusting Imports of Copper Into the United States	July 30, 2025	August 5, 2025	90 FR 37727	2025-14893	
79	10963	National Purple Heart Day, 2025	August 7, 2025	August 12, 2025	90 FR 38919	2025-15339	
80	10964	90th Anniversary of the Social Security Act	August 14, 2025	August 19, 2025	90 FR 40229	2025-15827	
81	10965	Fourth Anniversary of the Attack at Abbey Gate, 2025	August 25, 2025	August 28, 2025	90 FR 42119	2025-16599	
82	10966	Honoring the Victims of the Tragedy in Minneapolis, Minnesota	August 27, 2025	September 2, 2025	90 FR 42515	2025-16846	
83	10967	Overdose Prevention Week, 2025	August 28, 2025	September 3, 2025	90 FR 42679	2025-16922	
84	10968	Labor Day, 2025	August 28, 2025	September 3, 2025	90 FR 42681	2025-16968	
85	10969	Honoring the Memory of Charlie Kirk	September 10, 2025	September 15, 2025	90 FR 44487	2025-17860	
86	10970	Patriot Day 2025, the 24th Anniversary of the September 11 Terrorist Attacks	September 11, 2025	September 16, 2025	90 FR 44761	2025-17966	
87	10971	Constitution Week, 2025	September 18, 2025	September 23, 2025	90 FR 45905	2025-18485	
88	10972	National POW/MIA Recognition Day, 2025	September 19, 2025	September 24, 2025	90 FR 46025	2025-18600	
89	10973	Restriction on Entry of Certain Nonimmigrant Workers	September 19, 2025	September 24, 2025	90 FR 46027	2025-18601	
90	10974	National Hispanic Heritage Month, 2025	September 22, 2025	September 25, 2025	90 FR 46315	2025-18708	
91	10975	Gold Star Mother's and Family's Day, 2025	September 25, 2025	September 30, 2025	90 FR 47217	2025-19138	
92	10976	Adjusting Imports of Timber, Lumber, and Their Derivative Products Into the United States	September 29, 2025	October 6, 2025	90 FR 48127	2025-19482	
93	10977	National Manufacturing Day, 2025	October 3, 2025	October 7, 2025	90 FR 48159	2025-19497	
94	10978	Fire Prevention Week, 2025	October 7, 2025	October 9, 2025	90 FR 48217	2025-19534	
95	10979	Leif Erikson Day, 2025	October 9, 2025	October 14, 2025	90 FR 48247	2025-19561	
96	10980	Columbus Day, 2025	October 9, 2025	October 14, 2025	90 FR 48249	2025-19563	
97	10981	General Pulaski Memorial Day, 2025	October 10, 2025	October 16, 2025	90 FR 48331	2025-19585	
98	10982	250th Anniversary of the Founding of the United States Navy	October 10, 2025	October 16, 2025	90 FR 48333	2025-19586	
99	10983	National Day of Remembrance for Charlie Kirk	October 14, 2025	October 17, 2025	90 FR 48371	2025-19594	
100	10984	Adjusting Imports of Medium- and Heavy-Duty Vehicles, Medium- and Heavy-Duty Vehicle Parts, and Buses Into the United States	October 17, 2025	October 22, 2025	90 FR 48451	2025-19639	
101	10985	National Cybersecurity Awareness Month, 2025	October 17, 2025	October 22, 2025	90 FR 48477	2025-19640	
102	10986	National Energy Dominance Month, 2025	October 17, 2025	October 22, 2025	90 FR 48479	2025-19641	
103	10987	Regulatory Relief for Certain Stationary Sources To Promote American Mineral Security	October 24, 2025	November 3, 2025	90 FR 49211	2025-19775	
104	10988	Anti-Communism Week, 2025	November 7, 2025	November 13, 2025	90 FR 51015	2025-19892	
105	10989	Granting Pardons for Certain Offenses Related to the 2020 Presidential Election	November 7, 2025	November 14, 2025	90 FR 51071	2025-19928	
106	10990	250th Anniversary of the Founding of the United States Marine Corps	November 10, 2025	November 14, 2025	90 FR 51077	2025-19994	
107	10991	Veterans Day, 2025	November 10, 2025	November 14, 2025	90 FR 51079	2025-19995	
108	10992	National Adoption Month, 2025	November 17, 2025	November 20, 2025	90 FR 52549	2025-20570	
109	10993	Regulatory Relief for Certain Stationary Sources To Promote American Coke Oven Processing Security	November 21, 2025	November 26, 2025	90 FR 54517	2025-21418	
110	10994	Thanksgiving Day, 2025	November 25, 2025	December 3, 2025	90 FR 55787	2025-21910	
111	10995	Honoring the Memory of Specialist Sarah Beckstrom, West Virginia Army National Guard	December 4, 2025	December 9, 2025	90 FR 57135	2025-22423	
112	10996	National Pearl Harbor Remembrance Day, 2025	December 5, 2025	December 10, 2025	90 FR 57347	2025-22536	
113	10997	Bill of Rights Day, 2025	December 15, 2025	December 18, 2025	90 FR 59363	2025-23416	
114	10998	Restricting and Limiting the Entry of Foreign Nationals To Protect the Security of the United States	December 16, 2025	December 19, 2025	90 FR 59717	2025-23570	
115	10999	To Implement the United States-Israel Agreement on Trade in Agricultural Products and for Other Purposes	December 29, 2025	January 8, 2026	91 FR 889	2026-00245	
116	11000	Amendments to Adjusting Imports of Timber, Lumber, and Their Derivative Products Into the United States	December 31, 2025	January 9, 2026	91 FR 1039	2026-00327	

== See also ==
- List of proclamations by Donald Trump (2017)
- List of proclamations by Donald Trump (2018)
- List of proclamations by Donald Trump (2019)
- List of proclamations by Donald Trump (2020–21)
- List of proclamations by Donald Trump (2026)
