= 2017 National Day of Patriotic Devotion =

Presidential proclamation

National Day of Patriotic Devotion, 2017

Presidential proclamation
- Signed by: Donald Trump
- Signed: January 20, 2017

National Day of Patriotic Devotion, 2017 was the first Presidential proclamation signed by President Donald Trump.

== History ==
A presidential proclamation is a statement issued by a president on a matter of public policy issued under specific authority granted to the President by Congress and typically on a matter of widespread interest. Executive orders, Presidential memoranda, and Presidential proclamations are compiled by the Office of the Federal Register (within the National Archives and Records Administration) and is printed by the Government Printing Office which are published daily, except on federal holidays. A free source to get a copy of these documents is the Federal Register that contains government agency rules, proposed rules, and public notices. There are no copyright restrictions on the Federal Register; as a work of the U.S. government, it is in the public domain.

National Day of Patriotic Devotion, 2017 was proclaimed on January 20, 2017, for Trump's presidential inaugural address.

== National Day of Patriotic Devotion ==
The proclamation is as follows:

- A new national pride stirs the American soul and inspires the American heart. We are one people, united by a common destiny and a shared purpose.
- Freedom is the birthright of all Americans, and to preserve that freedom we must maintain faith in our sacred values and heritage.
- Our Constitution is written on parchment, but it lives in the hearts of the American people. There is no freedom where the people do not believe in it; no law where the people do not follow it; and no peace where the people do not pray for it.
- There are no greater people than the American citizenry, and as long as we believe in ourselves, and our country, there is nothing we cannot accomplish.
- NOW, THEREFORE, I, DONALD J. TRUMP, President of the United States of America, by virtue of the authority vested in me by the Constitution and the laws of the United States, do hereby proclaim January 20, 2017, as National Day of Patriotic Devotion, in order to strengthen our bonds to each other and to our country—and to renew the duties of Government to the people.
- IN WITNESS WHEREOF, I have hereunto set my hand this twentieth day of January, in the year of our Lord two thousand seventeen, and of the Independence of the United States of America the two hundred and forty-first.
