= National Family Week (UK) =

- Begins: August 25th 2014
- Ends: August 31st 2014
- Frequency: Annually
- Location: UK
- Years active: 17
- Inaugurated: 2009
- Most recent: 2014
- Website: http://www.nationalfamilyweek.co.uk

National Family Week is an annual event in the UK which celebrates family life. During National Family Week, supporting organizations including local authorities, sports clubs, charities, communities, and religious groups organize separate events such as family fun days, picnics, story times, and sports days. Funding for the initiative comes through commercial sponsorship, and the event is endorsed by, but does not receive funding from the UK government.

National Family Week was founded in 2009 by Nick Henry and Jane Nethersole of The Henley Media Group and was previously run by Family Week Limited, a company that was dissolved in 2019. It mirrors the established Canadian National Family Week, which was established in 1985.

== National Family Week 2009 ==
National Family Week 2009 consisted of over 4,000 events including a favorite family recipe competition, Family of the Year competition and search to find the next Big Family Idea where the Big Lottery Fund donated £150,000 to turn the winning ideas into a reality. The 2009 event also included a successful Guinness World Record attempt for the largest picnic across multiple venues which was attended by Sally Gunnell and Antony Worrall Thompson amongst other celebrities achieving 12,934 participants at 79 venues across the UK. Sponsors of the 2009 campaign included Sainsbury's, Bupa, Vue (cinema), Outwell, Seat and Legoland.

== National Family Week 2010 ==
Over 5,000 events took place during National Family Week 2010 and competitions were launched to find the best family photo and most talented family pet. A new Guinness World Record was also set for the largest three-legged race across multiple venues which included Twickenham Stadium and the City of Manchester Stadium with at total of 1,860 participants at 18 venues across the UK, on 5 June 2010. Sponsors of 2010 included Tesco Mobile, Hasbro, Chrysler and Vue (cinema).

== National Family Week 2011 ==
National Family Week 2011 included a headline event in Liverpool, ten flagship events and over 6,000 local events attracting more than 1 million people. The main sponsor was French's Mustard.

== Political supporters ==
- National Family Week has been endorsed by many of the UK's high-profile political figures including:
- David Cameron
- Nick Clegg
- Alex Salmond
- Boris Johnson
