= List of proclamations by Donald Trump (2020–21) =

The president of the United States may take any of several kinds of executive actions.

Executive orders are issued to help officers and agencies of the executive branch manage the operations within the federal government itself. Presidential memoranda are closely related, and have the force of law on the Executive Branch, but are generally considered less prestigious. Presidential memoranda do not have an established process for issuance, and unlike executive orders, they are not numbered. A presidential determination results in an official policy or position of the executive branch of the United States government. A presidential proclamation is a statement issued by a president on a matter of public policy, under specific authority granted to the president by Congress, typically on a matter of widespread interest. Administrative orders are signed documents such as notices, letters, and orders, that can be issued to conduct administrative operations of the federal government. A presidential notice or a presidential sequestration order can also be issued.

== Presidential proclamations ==
=== 2020 ===
Relative no.	Absolute no.	Title / description	Date signed	Date published	FR citation	FR doc. number	Ref.
407	9976	Religious Freedom Day, 2020	January 15, 2020	January 21, 2020	85 FR 3537	2020-01058	
408	9977	Martin Luther King Jr., Federal Holiday, 2020	January 17, 2020	January 23, 2020	85 FR 3811	2020-01164	
409	9978	National Sanctity of Human Life Day, 2020	January 21, 2020	January 24, 2020	85 FR 4189	2020-01343	
410	9979	To Further Facilitate Positive Adjustment to Competition From Imports of Large Residential Washers	January 23, 2020	January 28, 2020	85 FR 5125	2020-01650	
411	9980	Adjusting Imports of Derivative Aluminum Articles and Derivative Steel Articles Into the United States	January 24, 2020	January 29, 2020	85 FR 5281	2020-01806	
412	9981	National Day of Remembrance of the 75th Anniversary of the Liberation of Auschwitz, 2020	January 24, 2020	January 29, 2020	85 FR 5295	2020-01814	
413	9982	National School Choice Week, 2020	January 24, 2020	January 29, 2020	85 FR 5297	2020-01817	
414	9983	Improving Enhanced Vetting Capabilities and Processes for Detecting Attempted Entry Into the United States by Terrorists or Other Public-Safety Threats	January 31, 2020	February 5, 2020	85 FR 6699	2020-02422	
415	9984	Suspension of Entry as Immigrants and Nonimmigrants of Persons Who Pose a Risk of Transmitting 2019 Novel Coronavirus and Other Appropriate Measures To Address This Risk	January 31, 2020	February 5, 2020	85 FR 6709	2020-02424	
416	9985	American Heart Month, 2020	January 31, 2020	February 5, 2020	85 FR 6715	2020-02427	
417	9986	Career and Technical Education Month, 2020	January 31, 2020	February 5, 2020	85 FR 6717	2020-02428	
418	9987	National African American History Month, 2020	January 31, 2020	February 5, 2020	85 FR 6719	2020-02429	
419	9988	American Red Cross Month, 2020	February 28, 2020	March 4, 2020	85 FR 12715	2020-04544	
420	9989	Irish-American Heritage Month, 2020	February 28, 2020	March 4, 2020	85 FR 12717	2020-04547	
421	9990	Women's History Month, 2020	February 28, 2020	March 4, 2020	85 FR 12719	2020-04550	
422	9991	National Consumer Protection Week, 2020	February 28, 2020	March 4, 2020	85 FR 12721	2020-04555	
423	9992	Suspension of Entry as Immigrants and Nonimmigrants of Certain Additional Persons Who Pose a Risk of Transmitting 2019 Novel Coronavirus	February 29, 2020	March 4, 2020	85 FR 12855	2020-04595	
424	9993	Suspension of Entry as Immigrants and Nonimmigrants of Certain Additional Persons Who Pose a Risk of Transmitting 2019 Novel Coronavirus	March 11, 2020	March 16, 2020	85 FR 15045	2020-05578	
425	9994	Declaring a National Emergency Concerning the Novel Coronavirus Disease (COVID-19) Outbreak	March 13, 2020	March 18, 2020	85 FR 15337	2020-05794	
426	9995	National Poison Prevention Week, 2020	March 13, 2020	March 18, 2020	85 FR 15339	2020-05795	
427	9996	Suspension of Entry as Immigrants and Nonimmigrants of Certain Additional Persons Who Pose a Risk of Transmitting 2019 Novel Coronavirus	March 14, 2020	March 18, 2020	85 FR 15341	2020-05797	
428	9997	National Day of Prayer for All Americans Affected by the Coronavirus Pandemic and for Our National Response Efforts	March 14, 2020	March 18, 2020	85 FR 15345	2020-05798	
429	9998	National Agriculture Day, 2020	March 23, 2020	March 26, 2020	85 FR 16999	2020-06477	
430	9999	Greek Independence Day: A National Day of Celebration of Greek and American Democracy, 2020	March 24, 2020	March 27, 2020	85 FR 17471	2020-06627	
431	10000	National Doctors Day, 2020	March 30, 2020	April 2, 2020	85 FR 18847	2020-07091	
432	10001	Cancer Control Month, 2020	March 31, 2020	April 6, 2020	85 FR 19361	2020-07299	
433	10002	National Child Abuse Prevention Month, 2020	March 31, 2020	April 6, 2020	85 FR 19363	2020-07303	
434	10003	National Donate Life Month, 2020	March 31, 2020	April 6, 2020	85 FR 19365	2020-07305	
435	10004	National Sexual Assault Awareness and Prevention Month, 2020	March 31, 2020	April 6, 2020	85 FR 19367	2020-07308	
436	10005	Second Chance Month, 2020	March 31, 2020	April 6, 2020	85 FR 19369	2020-07309	
437	10006	World Autism Awareness Day, 2020	April 1, 2020	April 7, 2020	85 FR 19375	2020-07388	
438	10007	Education and Sharing Day, U.S.A., 2020	April 3, 2020	April 8, 2020	85 FR 19641	2020-07529	
439	10008	National Former Prisoner of War Recognition Day, 2020	April 8, 2020	April 13, 2020	85 FR 20385	2020-07826	
440	10009	Pan American Day and Pan American Week, 2020	April 13, 2020	April 16, 2020	85 FR 21309	2020-08246	
441	10010	National Crime Victims' Rights Week, 2020	April 17, 2020	April 23, 2020	85 FR 22943	2020-08838	
442	10011	National Park Week, 2020	April 17, 2020	April 23, 2020	85 FR 22945	2020-08840	
443	10012	National Volunteer Week, 2020	April 17, 2020	April 23, 2020	85 FR 22947	2020-08841	
444	10013	Days of Remembrance of Victims of the Holocaust, 2020	April 17, 2020	April 23, 2020	85 FR 22949	2020-08843	
445	10014	Suspension of Entry of Immigrants Who Present a Risk to the United States Labor Market During the Economic Recovery Following the 2019 Novel Coronavirus Outbreak	April 22, 2020	April 27, 2020	85 FR 23441	2020-09068	
446	10015	World Intellectual Property Day, 2020	April 24, 2020	April 29, 2020	85 FR 23891	2020-09263	
447	10016	Asian American and Pacific Islander Heritage Month, 2020	April 29, 2020	May 4, 2020	85 FR 26585	2020-09642	
448	10017	Jewish American Heritage Month, 2020	April 29, 2020	May 4, 2020	85 FR 26587	2020-09643	
449	10018	Law Day, U.S.A., 2020	April 29, 2020	May 4, 2020	85 FR 26589	2020-09644	
450	10019	National Foster Care Month, 2020	April 30, 2020	May 5, 2020	85 FR 26823	2020-09736	
451	10020	National Mental Health Awareness Month, 2020	April 30, 2020	May 5, 2020	85 FR 26825	2020-09737	
452	10021	National Physical Fitness and Sports Month, 2020	April 30, 2020	May 5, 2020	85 FR 26829	2020-09738	
453	10022	Older Americans Month, 2020	April 30, 2020	May 5, 2020	85 FR 26831	2020-09739	
454	10023	Loyalty Day, 2020	April 30, 2020	May 5, 2020	85 FR 26833	2020-09740	
455	10024	National Hurricane Preparedness Week, 2020	May 1, 2020	May 7, 2020	85 FR 27283	2020-09970	
456	10025	Public Service Recognition Week, 2020	May 1, 2020	May 7, 2020	85 FR 27285	2020-09972	
457	10026	Missing and Murdered American Indians and Alaska Natives Awareness Day, 2020	May 5, 2020	May 8, 2020	85 FR 27633	2020-10076	
458	10027	National Day of Prayer, 2020	May 6, 2020	May 11, 2020	85 FR 27905	2020-10225	
459	10028	National Nurses Day, 2020	May 6, 2020	May 11, 2020	85 FR 27907	2020-10226	
460	10029	Military Spouse Day, 2020	May 7, 2020	May 12, 2020	85 FR 28469	2020-10314	
461	10030	National Charter Schools Week, 2020	May 8, 2020	May 13, 2020	85 FR 28831	2020-10424	
462	10031	National Defense Transportation Day and National Transportation Week, 2020	May 8, 2020	May 13, 2020	85 FR 28833	2020-10425	
463	10032	Peace Officers Memorial Day and Police Week, 2020	May 8, 2020	May 13, 2020	85 FR 28835	2020-10430	
464	10033	Mother's Day, 2020	May 8, 2020	May 13, 2020	85 FR 28837	2020-10434	
465	10034	Armed Forces Day, 2020	May 15, 2020	May 20, 2020	85 FR 30585	2020-10992	
466	10035	National Safe Boating Week, 2020	May 15, 2020	May 20, 2020	85 FR 30819	2020-11053	
467	10036	Emergency Medical Services Week, 2020	May 15, 2020	May 20, 2020	85 FR 30821	2020-11054	
468	10037	World Trade Week, 2020	May 15, 2020	May 20, 2020	85 FR 30823	2020-11064	
469	10038	National Maritime Day, 2020	May 21, 2020	May 27, 2020	85 FR 31927	2020-11538	
470	10039	Honoring the Victims of the Novel Coronavirus Pandemic	May 21, 2020	May 27, 2020	85 FR 31929	2020-11539	
471	10040	Prayer for Peace, Memorial Day, 2020	May 21, 2020	May 27, 2020	85 FR 31931	2020-11542	
472	10041	Suspension of Entry as Immigrants and Nonimmigrants of Certain Additional Persons Who Pose a Risk of Transmitting 2019 Novel Coronavirus	May 24, 2020	May 28, 2020	85 FR 31991	2020-11616	
473	10042	Amendment to Proclamation of May 24, 2020, Suspending Entry as Immigrants and Nonimmigrants of Certain Additional Persons Who Pose a Risk of Transmitting 2019 Novel Coronavirus	May 25, 2020	May 28, 2020	85 FR 32291	2020-11670	
474	10043	Suspension of Entry as Nonimmigrants of Certain Students and Researchers From the People's Republic of China	May 29, 2020	June 4, 2020	85 FR 34353	2020-12217	
475	10044	African-American Music Appreciation Month, 2020	May 29, 2020	June 5, 2020	85 FR 34941	2020-12415	
476	10045	Great Outdoors Month, 2020	May 29, 2020	June 5, 2020	85 FR 34943	2020-12416	
477	10046	National Caribbean-American Heritage Month, 2020	May 29, 2020	June 5, 2020	85 FR 34945	2020-12418	
478	10047	National Homeownership Month, 2020	May 29, 2020	June 5, 2020	85 FR 34947	2020-12421	
479	10048	National Ocean Month, 2020	May 29, 2020	June 5, 2020	85 FR 34949	2020-12428	
480	10049	Modifying the Northeast Canyons and Seamounts Marine National Monument	June 5, 2020	June 11, 2020	85 FR 35793	2020-12823	
481	10050	Flag Day and National Flag Week, 2020	June 12, 2020	June 17, 2020	85 FR 36467	2020-13177	
482	10051	Father's Day, 2020	June 19, 2020	June 24, 2020	85 FR 38029	2020-13776	
483	10052	Suspension of Entry of Immigrants and Nonimmigrants Who Present a Risk to the United States Labor Market During the Economic Recovery Following the 2019 Novel Coronavirus Outbreak	June 22, 2020	June 25, 2020	85 FR 38263	2020-13888	
484	10053	To Take Certain Actions Under the United States- Mexico-Canada Agreement Implementation Act and for Other Purposes	June 29, 2020	July 1, 2020	85 FR 39821	2020-14448	
485	10054	Amendment to Proclamation 10052	June 29, 2020	July 2, 2020	85 FR 40085	2020-14510	
486	10055	Pledge to America's Workers Month, 2020	June 30, 2020	July 6, 2020	85 FR 40087	2020-14598	
487	10056	Captive Nations Week, 2020	July 17, 2020	July 22, 2020	85 FR 44449	2020-16035	
488	10057	Death of John Lewis	July 18, 2020	July 23, 2020	85 FR 44451	2020-16098	
489	10058	Anniversary of the Americans With Disabilities Act, 2020	July 24, 2020	July 29, 2020	85 FR 45743	2020-16591	
490	10059	National Korean War Veterans Armistice Day, 2020	July 24, 2020	July 29, 2020	85 FR 45745	2020-16593	
491	10060	Adjusting Imports of Aluminum Into the United States	August 6, 2020	August 14, 2020	85 FR 49921	2020-17977	
492	10061	National Employer Support of the Guard and Reserve Week, 2020	August 14, 2020	August 19, 2020	85 FR 51295	2020-18340	
493	10062	100th Anniversary of the Ratification of the Nineteenth Amendment	August 18, 2020	August 21, 2020	85 FR 51631	2020-18536	
494	10063	Women's Equality Day, 2020	August 25, 2020	August 28, 2020	85 FR 53643	2020-19208	
495	10064	Adjusting Imports of Steel Into the United States	August 28, 2020	September 2, 2020	85 FR 54877	2020-19595	
496	10065	National Alcohol and Drug Addiction Recovery Month, 2020	August 31, 2020	September 3, 2020	85 FR 55161	2020-19742	
497	10066	National Childhood Cancer Awareness Month, 2020	August 31, 2020	September 3, 2020	85 FR 55163	2020-19750	
498	10067	National Preparedness Month, 2020	August 31, 2020	September 3, 2020	85 FR 55165	2020-19751	
499	10068	National Sickle Cell Disease Awareness Month, 2020	August 31, 2020	September 3, 2020	85 FR 55167	2020-19754	
500	10069	Labor Day, 2020	September 4, 2020	September 11, 2020	85 FR 56463	2020-20281	
501	10070	National Days of Prayer and Remembrance, 2020	September 3, 2020	September 15, 2020	85 FR 57663	2020-20483	
502	10071	Revision to United States Marine Scientific Research Policy	September 9, 2020	September 18, 2020	85 FR 59165	2020-20847	
503	10072	Patriot Day, 2020	September 10, 2020	September 18, 2020	85 FR 59167	2020-20855	
504	10073	Minority Enterprise Development Week, 2020	September 11, 2020	September 23, 2020	85 FR 59643	2020-21114	
505	10074	Prescription Opioid and Heroin Epidemic Awareness Week, 2020	September 11, 2020	September 23, 2020	85 FR 59645	2020-21116	
506	10075	National Historically Black Colleges and Universities Week, 2020	September 11, 2020	September 23, 2020	85 FR 59647	2020-21126	
507	10076	National Hispanic Heritage Month, 2020	September 14, 2020	September 23, 2020	85 FR 60041	2020-21159	
508	10077	Constitution Day, Citizenship Day, and Constitution Week, 2020	September 17, 2020	September 24, 2020	85 FR 60337	2020-21312	
509	10078	National POW/MIA Recognition Day, 2020	September 17, 2020	September 24, 2020	85 FR 60339	2020-21313	
510	10079	National Farm Safety and Health Week, 2020	September 18, 2020	September 25, 2020	85 FR 60341	2020-21378	
511	10080	National Gang Violence Prevention Week, 2020	September 18, 2020	September 25, 2020	85 FR 60343	2020-21381	
512	10081	Death of Ruth Bader Ginsburg	September 18, 2020	September 25, 2020	85 FR 60345	2020-21385	
513	10082	National Small Business Week, 2020	September 19, 2020	September 25, 2020	85 FR 60681	2020-21422	
514	10083	Gold Star Mother's and Family's Day, 2020	September 25, 2020	September 30, 2020	85 FR 61569	2020-21755	
515	10084	National Hunting and Fishing Day, 2020	September 25, 2020	September 30, 2020	85 FR 61803	2020-21792	
516	10085	National Breast Cancer Awareness Month, 2020	September 30, 2020	October 6, 2020	85 FR 62921	2020-22174	
517	10086	National Cybersecurity Awareness Month, 2020	September 30, 2020	October 6, 2020	85 FR 62923	2020-22182	
518	10087	National Disability Employment Awareness Month, 2020	September 30, 2020	October 6, 2020	85 FR 62925	2020-22185	
519	10088	National Domestic Violence Awareness Month, 2020	September 30, 2020	October 6, 2020	85 FR 62927	2020-22194	
520	10089	National Energy Awareness Month, 2020	September 30, 2020	October 6, 2020	85 FR 62929	2020-22195	
521	10090	National Substance Abuse Prevention Month, 2020	September 30, 2020	October 6, 2020	85 FR 62931	2020-22196	
522	10091	National Manufacturing Day, 2020	October 1, 2020	October 7, 2020	85 FR 63187	2020-22349	
523	10092	Fire Prevention Week, 2020	October 3, 2020	October 8, 2020	85 FR 63969	2020-22498	
524	10093	Made in America Day and Made in America Week, 2020	October 3, 2020	October 8, 2020	85 FR 63971	2020-22506	
525	10094	Child Health Day, 2020	October 3, 2020	October 8, 2020	85 FR 63973	2020-22507	
526	10095	German-American Day, 2020	October 5, 2020	October 9, 2020	85 FR 64373	2020-22635	
527	10096	Birthday of Founding Father Caesar Rodney	October 6, 2020	October 14, 2020	85 FR 65181	2020-22907	
528	10097	Leif Erikson Day, 2020	October 8, 2020	October 14, 2020	85 FR 65185	2020-22908	
529	10098	National School Lunch Week, 2020	October 9, 2020	October 16, 2020	85 FR 65633	2020-23102	
530	10099	General Pulaski Memorial Day, 2020	October 9, 2020	October 16, 2020	85 FR 65635	2020-23105	
531	10100	Columbus Day, 2020	October 9, 2020	October 16, 2020	85 FR 65637	2020-23107	
532	10101	To Further Facilitate Positive Adjustment to Competition From Imports of Certain Crystalline Silicon Photovoltaic Cells (Whether or Not Partially or Fully Assembled Into Other Products)	October 10, 2020	October 16, 2020	85 FR 65639	2020-23108	
533	10102	Blind Americans Equality Day, 2020	October 14, 2020	October 19, 2020	85 FR 66467	2020-23246	
534	10103	National Character Counts Week, 2020	October 16, 2020	October 22, 2020	85 FR 67261	2020-23538	
535	10104	National Forest Products Week, 2020	October 16, 2020	October 22, 2020	85 FR 67263	2020-23539	
536	10105	United Nations Day, 2020	October 23, 2020	October 29, 2020	85 FR 68707	2020-24169	
537	10106	Adjusting Imports of Aluminum Into the United States	October 27, 2020	October 30, 2020	85 FR 68709	2020-24200	
538	10107	To Modify Duty-Free Treatment Under the Generalized System of Preferences and for Other Purposes	October 30, 2020	November 4, 2020	85 FR 70027	2020-24589	
539	10108	Critical Infrastructure Security and Resilience Month, 2020	October 30, 2020	November 5, 2020	85 FR 70415	2020-24737	
540	10109	National Adoption Month, 2020	October 30, 2020	November 5, 2020	85 FR 70417	2020-24738	
541	10110	National American History and Founders Month, 2020	October 30, 2020	November 5, 2020	85 FR 70419	2020-24739	
542	10111	National Entrepreneurship Month, 2020	October 30, 2020	November 5, 2020	85 FR 70421	2020-24740	
543	10112	National Family Caregivers Month, 2020	October 30, 2020	November 5, 2020	85 FR 70423	2020-24741	
544	10113	National Native American Heritage Month, 2020	October 30, 2020	November 5, 2020	85 FR 70425	2020-24742	
545	10114	National Veterans and Military Families Month, 2020	October 30, 2020	November 5, 2020	85 FR 70427	2020-24743	
546	10115	National Day of Remembrance for Americans Killed by Illegal Aliens, 2020	October 30, 2020	November 5, 2020	85 FR 70429	2020-24744	
547	10116	National Apprenticeship Week, 2020	November 6, 2020	November 12, 2020	85 FR 72547	2020-25191	
548	10117	World Freedom Day, 2020	November 6, 2020	November 12, 2020	85 FR 72549	2020-25193	
549	10118	Veterans Day, 2020	November 10, 2020	November 16, 2020	85 FR 73183	2020-25395	
550	10119	American Education Week, 2020	November 13, 2020	November 18, 2020	85 FR 73399	2020-25572	
551	10120	National Family Week, 2020	November 20, 2020	November 25, 2020	85 FR 75221	2020-26228	
552	10121	Thanksgiving Day, 2020	November 25, 2020	December 2, 2020	85 FR 77343	2020-26629	
553	10122	National Impaired Driving Prevention Month, 2020	November 26, 2020	December 3, 2020	85 FR 78193	2020-26792	
554	10123	World AIDS Day, 2020	November 26, 2020	December 3, 2020	85 FR 78195	2020-26793	
555	10124	Human Rights Day, Bill of Rights Day, and Human Rights Week, 2020	December 4, 2020	December 9, 2020	85 FR 79375	2020-27242	
556	10125	National Pearl Harbor Remembrance Day, 2020	December 4, 2020	December 9, 2020	85 FR 79377	2020-27243	
557	10126	Recognizing the Sovereignty of the Kingdom of Morocco Over the Western Sahara	December 4, 2020	December 15, 2020	85 FR 81329	2020-27738	
558	10127	Wright Brothers Day, 2020	December 16, 2020	December 21, 2020	85 FR 82871	2020-28263	
559	10128	To Take Certain Actions Under the African Growth and Opportunity Act and for Other Purposes	December 22, 2020	December 29, 2020	85 FR 85491	2020-28878	
560	10129	850th Anniversary of the Martyrdom of Saint Thomas Becket	December 28, 2020	January 4, 2021	86 FR 215	2021-29226	
561	10130	National Slavery and Human Trafficking Prevention Month, 2021	December 31, 2020	January 6, 2021	86 FR 413	2021-00038	
562	10131	Suspension of Entry of Immigrants and Nonimmigrants Who Continue To Present a Risk to the United States Labor Market During the Economic Recovery Following the 2019 Novel Coronavirus Outbreak	December 31, 2020	January 6, 2021	86 FR 417	2021-00039	

=== 2021 ===
Relative no.	Absolute no.	Title / description	Date signed	Date published	FR citation	FR doc. number	Ref.
563	10132	Honoring United States Capitol Police Officers	January 10, 2021	January 13, 2021	86 FR 2951	2021-00830	
564	10133	To Continue Facilitating Positive Adjustment to Competition From Imports of Large Residential Washers	January 14, 2021	January 21, 2021	86 FR 6541	2021-01466	
565	10134	Religious Freedom Day, 2021	January 15, 2021	January 22, 2021	86 FR 6553	2021-01564	
566	10135	Martin Luther King Jr., Federal Holiday, 2021	January 15, 2021	January 22, 2021	86 FR 6555	2021-01565	
567	10136	National Sanctity of Human Life Day, 2021	January 17, 2021	January 22, 2021	86 FR 6795	2021-01610	
568	10137	National School Choice Week, 2021	January 17, 2021	January 22, 2021	86 FR 6797	2021-01633	
569	10138	Terminating Suspensions of Entry Into the United States of Aliens Who Have Been Physically Present in the Schengen Area, the United Kingdom, the Republic of Ireland, and the Federative Republic of Brazil	January 18, 2021	January 22, 2021	86 FR 6799	2021-01634	
570	10139	Adjusting Imports of Aluminum Into the United States	January 19, 2021	January 25, 2021	86 FR 6825	2021-01711	

== See also ==
- List of proclamations by Donald Trump (2017)
- List of proclamations by Donald Trump (2018)
- List of proclamations by Donald Trump (2019)
- List of proclamations by Donald Trump (2025)
