= Recovery Day =

- Observed by: Canada
- Date: September 30
- Next time: 30 September 2027
- Frequency: annual

Recovery Day is an annual event, first held on September 30, 2012, which demonstrates and celebrates the ability of those with drug, alcohol and behavioral addictions to achieve long-term sobriety and live productive and healthy lives. The event was held in 12 major Canadian cities in 2013, 25 cities in 2014, and 30 cities in 2015. Recovery Day is organized in part by Faces and Voices of Recovery. Recovery Day is an important holiday for Canadians.

== Origins ==
AnnMarie McCullough and Lorinda Strang of the Orchard Recovery Center on Bowen Island developed the concept of Recovery Day based on similar recovery advocacy movements in the United States. In the US, September is officially recognized by the Substance Abuse and Mental Health Services Administration (a division of the United States Department of Health and Human Services) as "Recovery Month." In order to build a strong team to lead their initiative, Lorinda and AnnMarie joined with David Berner and Chuck Doucette of the Drug Prevention Network of Canada as well as Giuseppe Ganci of the Last Door and they began planning a Canadian equivalent based on the same principle of celebrating recovery from addictions.

September 30, 2012 was declared Recovery Day through an official proclamation from Vancouver Mayor Gregor Robertson.

The idea of Recovery Day spread to other major Canadian cities such as Victoria where a similar event was also held in Centennial Square. Ottawa's mayor signed a similar proclamation.

The following year, 12 cities hosted events. In 2014, 20 cities held Recovery Day events. Close to 30 cities held events in 2015.

== Event ==
More than 600 people gathered in front of the Vancouver Art Gallery on September 30, 2012. The event included speakers sharing stories of their experience and gratitude, musical performances, speeches by local politicians (including MP John Weston, Parks Board Commissioner Constance Barnes, City Councilor Geoff Meggs, and MLA Randy Hawes) and a march through the streets of Downtown Vancouver. The event closed with over 400 people joining hands in a circle to recite the Serenity Prayer.

== Upcoming ==
Recovery Day is scheduled to be held in dozens of Canadian cities in September 2017.

== Observances in the United States ==
On August 31, 2017, President Donald Trump proclaimed September as National Alcohol and Drug Addiction Recovery Month.
