= Military Spouse Day =

United States annual observance

Military Spouse Day or Military Spouse Appreciation Day is celebrated on the Friday before Mother's Day in the United States. Many United States citizens take this day to acknowledge the significant contributions, support, and sacrifices of spouses of their Armed Forces. Each year, the US President normally commemorates this day with a ceremonial speech and proclamation.

== History ==
President Ronald Reagan recognized the profound importance of spouse commitment to the readiness and well-being of military members and declared May 23, 1984 the first Military Spouse Day with Proclamation 5184, dated April 17, 1984. The US Secretary of Defense, Caspar Weinberger standardized the date by declaring the Friday preceding Mother's Day as Military Spouse Day. On May 12, 2017, Donald Trump issued a Presidential proclamation for Military Spouse Day.
