= National Family Week =

Annual observance

National Family Week originated in Canada and takes place the week before Thanksgiving every year. It was proclaimed an official week by the government of Canada in 1985. National Family Week is celebrated throughout the country with special events put on by community organizations. National Family Week also exists in the United Kingdom, the United States, and Australia.

It is a distinct event from Family Day which is a statutory holiday created by the provincial governments of Ontario, Alberta and Saskatchewan.

== Canada ==
National Family Week (French: Semaine Nationale de la Familie) is largely a public awareness campaign, the purpose of which is to celebrate families. Each year Families Canada, in partnership with other national organizations, creates downloadable resources for families and those who work with families to access when planning an event in their community. With a different theme each year, National Family week highlights various important aspects of family life.

=== Government perspective ===
National Family Week offers an opportunity for the federal government to honour families and to introduce new legislation or modify existing laws in ways that it deems will help families.

In 2007, Minister of Human Resources and Social Development, Monte Solberg, stated that "Canada's New Government is proud to celebrate National Family Week and to recognize the important role that families play in this country. Families are the building blocks of our society, and we will continue delivering on our commitment to support and strengthen them.”

== National Family Week UK ==
National Family Week takes place during the Summer half term holiday and is backed by over 180 not-for-profit organisations

== National Family Week United States ==
National Family Week in the United States takes place the week of American Thanksgiving. It was first proclaimed by Richard Nixon in 1972 pursuant to a resolution introduced in Congress by Representative John Myers (R-IN) upon the suggestion of a constituent, Sam Wiley. It is led annually by the National Family Week Foundation, established by Mr. Wiley and now managed by John Palatiello, a former staff assistant to Rep. Myers. President Donald Trump proclaimed the week of November 18 through November 24, 2018, as National Family Week.

== National Families Week Australia ==
The Australian Government, through the Department of Social Services, sponsors National Families Week with Families Australia. National Families Week coincides with the United Nations International Day of Families on 15 May, the day observed by the United Nations to mark the importance placed on families as the most fundamental units of society, and to show the international community's concern for family issues in many parts of the world.
