= Emergency Medical Services Week =

Emergency medical services (EMS) Week, or EMS Week, was originally authorized by President Gerald Ford on November 4, 1974, for the week of November 3–10. Since 1992, EMS Week has moved to the third week of May. In 2024, the 50th annual celebration for EMS Week is scheduled for the week of May 19-25, and the theme is "Honoring Our Past. Forging our Future."

Locally, the leadership of EMS agencies, hospitals, and representatives from local or state legislature recognize EMS personnel during the week through events such as cook outs, giveaways, awards, and public recognition..

== Past themes ==
- 2006 - EMS: Serving on Health Care’s Front Line.
- 2007 - Extraordinary People, Extraordinary Service.
- 2008 - Your Life is Our Mission
- 2009 - A Proud Partner In Your Community
- 2010 - Anytime. Anywhere. We’ll be there.
- 2011 - Everyday Heroes
- 2012 - EMS, More Than A Job, A Calling
- 2013 - EMS: One Mission. One Team.
- 2014 - Dedicated. For Life.
- 2015 - EMS Strong
- 2016 - Called To Care
- 2017 - EMS Strong — Always in Service
- 2018 - Stronger Together
- 2019 - EMS Strong – Beyond the Call
- 2020 - Ready Today. Preparing for Tomorrow.
- 2021 - This Is EMS: Caring for Our Communities
- 2022 - EMS Strong - Rising to the Challenge
