= Irish-American Heritage Month =

Annual observance in March

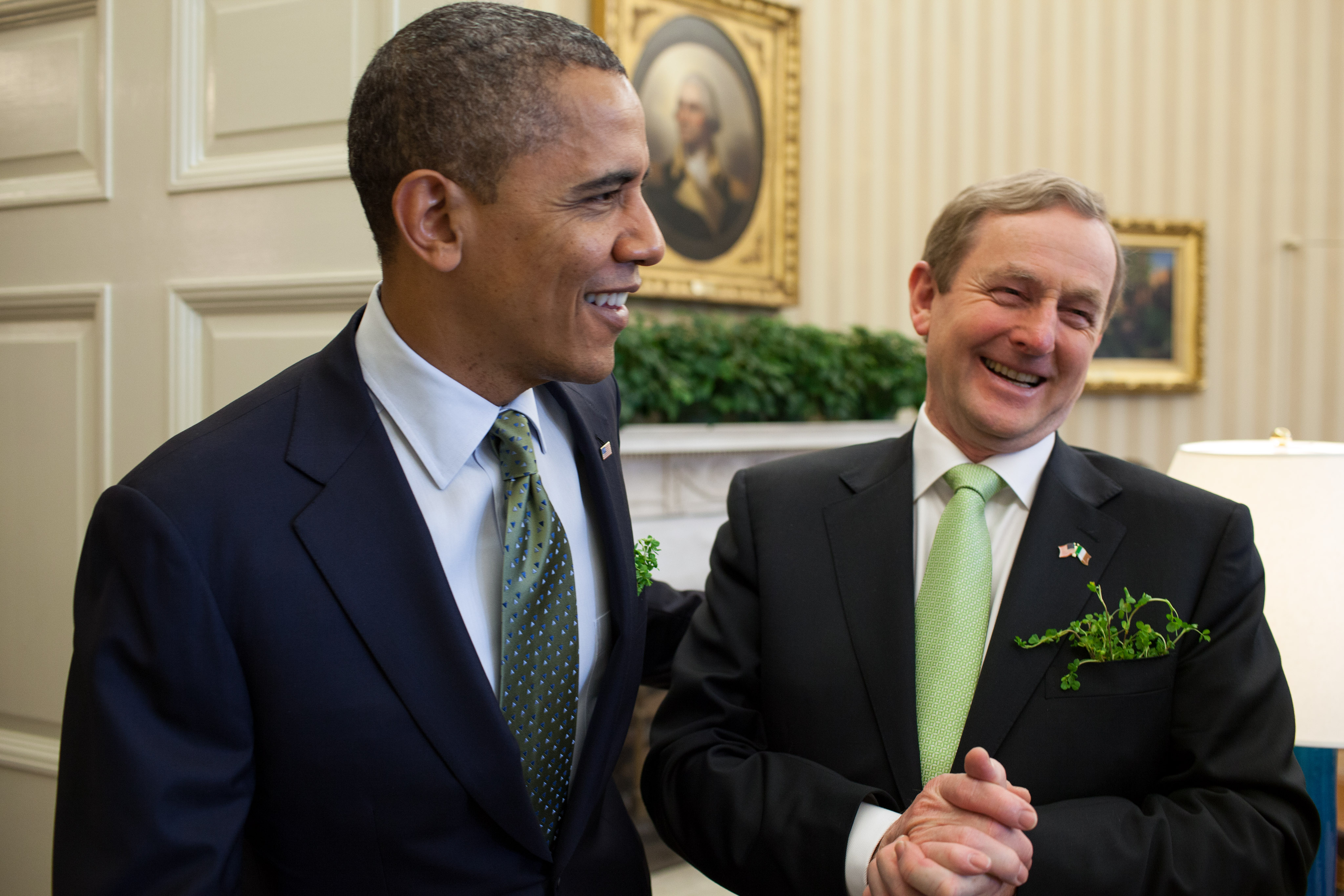
- President Barack Obama with Taoiseach Enda Kenny wearing shamrock in the Oval Office in March 2012
- Observed by: United States, Canada
- Type: National, heritage, cultural, ethnic
- Significance: Celebration of Irish-Americans contributions
- Date: Month of March
- Duration: 1 month
- Frequency: annual

Irish Heritage Month is an annual observance originating in the United States, where it is known as Irish-American Heritage Month. It has received official recognition from governments in the United States and Canada. It was first celebrated by proclamation of the President and Congress in the United States to honor the achievements and contributions of Irish Americans. The heritage month is in March to coincide with Saint Patrick's Day, the Irish national holiday on March 17. Heritage Months are usually proclaimed by nations to celebrate centuries of contributions by a group to a country.

Saint Patrick's Day is a Catholic religious holiday that honors the saint, who introduced Christianity to Ireland in the early fifth century. It has developed in the United States as a celebration of all things Irish. With large ethnic Irish populations, Boston and New York City both claim the world's first Saint Patrick's Day parade, while Philadelphia claims to be the second oldest behind New York City. In New York City, it occurred on March 17, 1762, featuring Irish soldiers serving in the British military protecting the Colonies during the French and Indian War. In 1948, President Harry S. Truman, of Scottish descent, attended the New York Saint Patrick's Day parade and gave a speech to attendees. This was a proud moment for the many Irish whose ancestors had to fight stereotypes and prejudice to find acceptance in the United States. In 1960 John F. Kennedy was elected as the first Irish American Catholic President; in 1961 he was in New York to review the Saint Patrick's Day Parade.

In tribute to all Irish Americans, the US Congress, by Public Law 101-418, designated March 1991 as "Irish-American Heritage Month" Congress again proclaimed March as Irish-American Heritage Month for 1995 and 1996.

Within the authority of the executive branch, the President of the United States has also issued a proclamation each year since 1991.

Each year in March, the Irish Taoiseach visits the United States for Saint Patrick's Day. A Shamrock Ceremony takes place in the morning at the White House where a crystal bowl containing shamrock, a traditional symbol of Ireland, is presented to the President in the Oval Office. This is followed by a Friends of Ireland luncheon hosted by the House Speaker in the U.S. Capitol or the Rayburn House Office Building. The luncheon is attended by the President, Vice President, the Taoiseach, the Speaker, and other officials. In the evening, a Saint Patrick's Day Reception takes place at the White House.

== 2026: Presidential message in lieu of proclamation ==
In March 2026, President Donald Trump did not issue a formal presidential proclamation designating March as Irish-American Heritage Month, the first time since the observance was established in 1991 that no such proclamation was issued. Trump had issued formal proclamations in each year of his first term (2017–2020) and again for March 2025 at the start of his second term.

Instead, on March 17, 2026 — Saint Patrick's Day itself — the White House published a "Presidential Message on Saint Patrick's Day and Irish American Heritage Month," which acknowledged the month and expressed support for the Irish-American community and U.S.–Ireland relations. Unlike a presidential proclamation — a formal executive document published in the Federal Register that constitutes an official designation and typically calls on relevant institutions to observe the occasion — a presidential message carries no such official status.

The absence of a proclamation was noted by Irish-American media and advocacy groups ahead of the Taoiseach's annual Shamrock Ceremony visit to the White House.

== George H.W. Bush Irish-American Heritage Month Proclamations ==
Proclamation 6259 – Irish-American Heritage Month, 1991 March 12, 1991

Proclamation 6408 – Irish-American Heritage Month, 1992 March 4, 1992

== William J. Clinton Irish-American Heritage Month Proclamations ==
Proclamation 6533 – Irish-American Heritage Month, 1993 March 6, 1993

Proclamation 6656 – Irish-American Heritage Month, 1994 March 8, 1994

Proclamation 6771 – Irish-American Heritage Month, 1995 February 23, 1995

Proclamation 6868 – Irish-American Heritage Month, 1996 March 1, 1996

Proclamation 6974 – Irish-American Heritage Month, 1997 February 27, 1997

Proclamation 7070 – Irish-American Heritage Month, 1998 February 27, 1998

Proclamation 7169 – Irish-American Heritage Month, 1999 March 1, 1999

Proclamation 7279 – Irish-American Heritage Month, 2000 March 1, 2000

== George W. Bush Irish-American Heritage Month Proclamations ==
Proclamation 7409 – Irish-American Heritage Month, 2001

Proclamation 7526 – Irish-American Heritage Month 2002

Proclamation 7649 – Irish-American Heritage Month, 2003

Proclamation 7760 – Irish-American Month, 2004

Proclamation 7873 – Irish-American Heritage Month, 2005

Proclamation 7983 – Irish-American Heritage Month, 2006

Proclamation 8107 – Irish-American Heritage Month, 2007

Proclamation 8223 – Irish-American Heritage Month, 2008

== Barack Obama Irish-American Heritage Month Proclamations ==
Proclamation 8350 – Irish-American Heritage Month, 2009

Proclamation 8479 – Irish-American Heritage Month, 2010

Irish-American Heritage Month, 2011

Irish-American Heritage Month, 2012

Irish-American Heritage Month, 2013 (February 28, 2013)

Irish-American Heritage Month, 2014 (February 28, 2014)

Irish-American Heritage Month, 2015 (February 27, 2015)

Irish-American Heritage Month, 2016 (February 29, 2016)

== Donald Trump Irish-American Heritage Month Proclamations ==
Irish-American Heritage Month, 2017 (March 1, 2017)

Irish-American Heritage Month, 2018 (February 28, 2018)

Irish-American Heritage Month, 2019 (March 1, 2019)

Irish-American Heritage Month, 2020 (February 29, 2020)

Irish-American Heritage Month, 2025 (March 6, 2025)

== Joseph Biden Irish-American Heritage Month Proclamations ==
Irish-American Heritage Month, 2021 (March 1, 2021)

Irish-American Heritage Month, 2022 (February 28, 2022)

Irish-American Heritage Month, 2023 (February 28, 2023)

Irish-American Heritage Month, 2024 (February 29, 2024)

== Canadian Proclamations ==
Irish Heritage Month, 2022 (March 1, 2022)

Irish Heritage Month, 2023 (March 1, 2023)

== See also ==
- List of Irish Americans
