= National Foster Care Month =

United States annual observation

National Foster Care Month is observed in the United States during the month of May every year. It began with President Ronald Reagan in 1988. Since 1988, National Foster Care Month continues to be recognized and celebrated.

== History ==
The original focus was to give foster parents the recognition they deserved for opening their homes to foster children in need and caring for them. However, the main focus and theme changes with every passing year. For example, in 2019, the theme for National Foster Care Month was "Foster Care as a Support to Families, not a Substitute for Parents". The main focus is focus on promoting family well-being with resources that highlight community involvement, collaborative relationships, and targeted support services as key factors in supporting family preservation and keeping families healthy, together, and strong.

As of 2018, it is estimated that over 440,000 children are in foster care.

Some of these children are not eligible for adoption, but many of them are. Every year, over 30,000 children age out of the foster system without a chance at permanence, which means the foster children are reaching the age of eighteen, no longer wards of the state, and out on their own. This means that the youth over the age of eighteen have no familial support, resources, or even job or life skills. These facts have fueled the motivation behind National Foster Care Month.

== Presidential action ==
Every year the current president of the United States issues a presidential proclamation specifically on National Foster Care Month. When President Reagan issued the first presidential proclamation, that established May as National Foster Care Month.

== National Foster Youth Shadow Day ==
Organized by the Congressional Caucus on Foster Youth, the annual National Foster Youth Shadow Day draws more than 60 current and former foster youth to the nation’s capital. The young people have meetings at the White House with members of the administration and spend a day shadowing their member of Congress in the Capitol to tell their stories.

In 2014, television personality Dr. Phil McGraw testified before the House Ways and Means Committee on National Foster Youth Shadow Day about the problem of foster youth being over-medicated with psychotropic drugs.

== Supporters ==
National Foster Care Month is supported and maintained by the Children's Bureau, Children Welfare Information Gateway, and their partners. In addition, the National Resource for Permanency and Family Connections, the National Foster Youth Institute, the Casey Family Programs, Foster Club, and the Congressional Caucus on Foster Youth.
