= National Preparedness Month =

Disaster readiness campaign

Since its inception in 2004, National Preparedness Month is observed each September in the United States of America. It is sponsored by the Federal Emergency Management Agency (FEMA) within the Department of Homeland Security and encourages Americans to take steps to prepare for emergencies in their communities. FEMA's Ready Campaign, the correlating public education outreach campaign, disseminates information to help the general public prepare for and respond to emergencies, including natural disasters and potential terrorist attacks.

== Important Preparedness Steps ==
As of 2016, the National Household Survey revealed that, while more than 75% of Americans surveyed report having supplies set aside in their homes just for disasters, less than 50% have a household emergency plan. National Preparedness Month encourages individuals get an emergency supply kit, make a family emergency plan, be informed about different emergencies that may affect them, and get trained and become engaged in community preparedness and response efforts. Businesses are encouraged to document their property and equipment, back up business-critical information, and put a response team in place.

== National Preparedness Goals ==
The National Preparedness Goal describes five mission areas — prevention, protection, mitigation, response and recovery. There are 32 activities called core capabilities, intended to assist everyone who has a role in achieving all of the elements in the Goal.
