= Patriot Day =

American day in remembrance of 9/11 victims

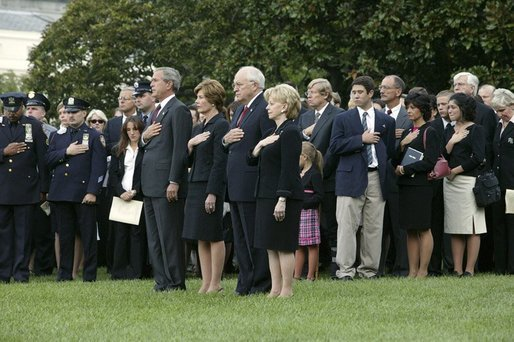
- Observed by: United States
- Type: Remembrance
- Significance: Attacks of September 11, 2001
- Celebrations: Memorial Services
- Date: September 11
- Frequency: Annual
- First time: September 11, 2002; 24 years ago

In the United States, Patriot Day occurs on September 11 of each year in memory of the victims killed in the September 11 terrorist attacks in 2001.

== History ==
In the immediate aftermath of the attacks, carried out by terrorists from Al-Qaeda, President George W. Bush proclaimed Friday, September 14, 2001, as a National Day of Prayer and Remembrance for the Victims of the Terrorist Attacks on September 11, 2001.

A bill to make September 11 a national day of mourning was introduced in the U.S. House on October 25, 2001, by Rep. Vito Fossella (R-NY) with 22 co-sponsors. The result was the resolution to proclaim September 11, 2002, as the first Patriot Day.

Original co-sponsors in the House were:

- Gary Ackerman (D-NY)
- Rick Boucher (D-VA)
- Eliot Engel (D-NY)
- Phil English (R-PA)
- Randy Forbes (R-VA)
- Benjamin Gilman (R-NY)
- Felix Grucci (R-NY)
- Maurice Hinchey (D-NY)
- Steve Israel (D-NY)
- Peter T. King (R-NY)
- Ray LaHood (R-IL)
- Carolyn Maloney (D-NY)
- Michael R. McNulty (D-NY)
- Jim Moran (D-VA)
- Jerry Nadler (D-NY)
- John E. Peterson (R-PA)
- Thomas M. Reynolds (R-NY)
- Ed Schrock (R-VA)
- Don Sherwood (R-PA)
- Ed Towns (D-NY)
- James T. Walsh (R-NY)

From 2009 to 2016, President Barack Obama proclaimed September 11 as Patriot Day and National Day of Service and Remembrance, in observance of the Edward M. Kennedy Serve America Act. In 2017, President Donald Trump proclaimed September 8–10 as National Days of Prayer and Remembrance, and proclaimed September 11 as Patriot Day. President Trump also did so in 2018, 2019, 2020, and 2025. When Joe Biden was president, he also issued Executive Orders for Patriot Day in 2021, 2022, 2023, and 2024.

== Observance ==
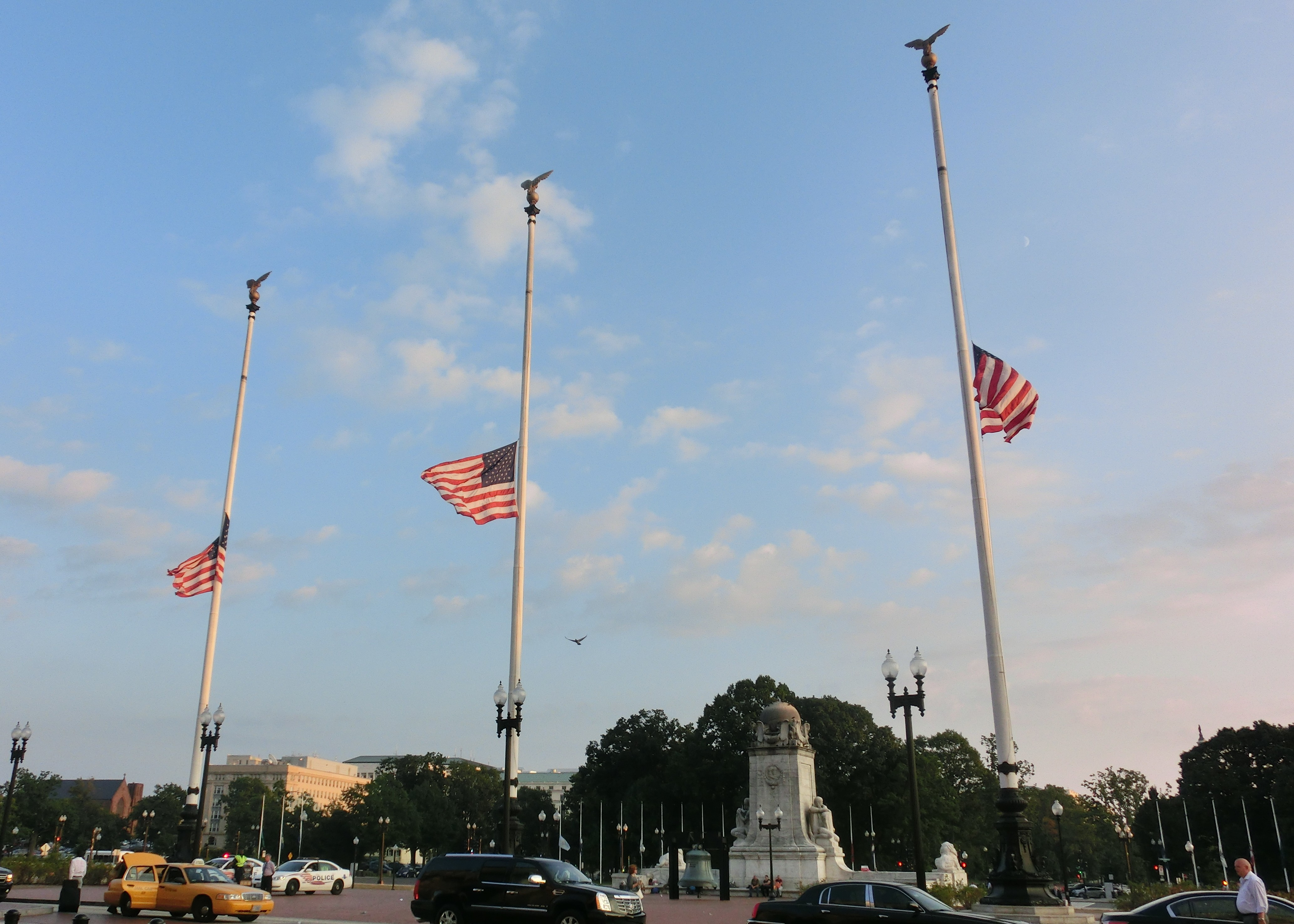
In Washington, D.C., three American flags fly at half-staff on Columbus Circle outside of Washington Union Station on Patriot Day 2013. The flags of several U.S. states and territories can be seen also flying at half-staff in the background.

The flag of the United States is flown at half-staff at the White House and on all U.S. government buildings and establishments throughout the world; Americans are also encouraged to display flags in and outside their homes. Additionally, a moment of silence is observed to correspond with the attacks, beginning at 8:46 a.m. (Eastern Daylight Time), the time the first plane, American Airlines Flight 11, struck the North Tower of the World Trade Center on September 11, 2001.

Volunteer and service opportunities are coordinated by the Corporation for National and Community Service.
