= National Crime Victims' Rights Week =

National Crime Victims' Rights Week is an annual commemoration in the United States that promotes victims' rights and services. The week is marked by an award ceremony held in Washington, D.C., in which individuals and organizations that demonstrate outstanding service in supporting victims and victim services are recognized. The exact date of the observance is the second Monday of June, which falls on June 9th 2025 this year.

The first Crime Victims Week (later renamed National Crime Victims' Rights Week) was established by Ronald Reagan in 1981 as a part of an expanding initiative to provide for victims of crimes (later manifested in Executive Order 12360, signed in 1982, which established the President's Task Force on Victims of Crime). The Office for Victims of Crime (OVC) leads the nation in the observance of National Crime Victims' Rights Week. Communities across the nation sponsor local events to mark the week and raise awareness about victims' rights and services.
