= National School Choice Week =

Awareness event for different educational choices

National School Choice Week was founded in 2011 to promote the concept of all forms of school choice: district schools, district magnet schools, charter schools, private schools, and home schooling. The event, which takes place the last week of January each year, is sponsored by the National School Choice Awareness Foundation.

== Overview ==
In 2014, Republican Sen. Ted Cruz and Democratic Rep. Sheila Jackson Lee appeared at a National School Choice Week event at Minute Maid Park in Houston. In 2015, National School Choice Week opened with a nationally televised event in Jacksonville, Florida, featuring speeches by former NFL player Desmond Howard, Democratic strategist Joe Trippi, and a video greeting by U.S. Senator Marco Rubio. In 2018, U.S. Secretary of Education Betsy DeVos spoke at a National School Choice Week event on Capitol Hill.

National education organizations that have participated in the week's events include the National Alliance for Public Charter Schools, Magnet Schools of America, the Council on American Private Education, the National Coalition for Public School Options, the Home School Legal Defense Association, the American Federation for Children, the Association of American Educators, the Black Alliance for Educational Options, the Children's Scholarship Fund, Choice Media, Education Reform Now, Families Empowered, the Foundation for Excellence in Education, and the 50 State Campaign for Achievement Now.

From 2015 to 2019, the US Senate passed a commemorative resolution recognizing School Choice Week, and U.S. President Donald Trump issued similar proclamations in 2017, 2018, and 2019.

The President of National School Choice Week is Andrew Campanella. He has served in this capacity since 2012.
