= National Volunteer Week =

Annual celebration

- Observed by: United States, Canada, United Kingdom, Australia, New Zealand

National Volunteer Week is an annual celebration observed in many countries, to promote and show appreciation for volunteerism and volunteering. In the United States, it is organized by the Points of Light foundation, and in Canada by Volunteer Canada. It is held in those two countries in mid to late April. In New Zealand and Australia, it is held in May. In the UK, it is held in the first week of June.

== History ==
=== Origin ===
In Canada, National Volunteer Week was first conceived in 1943 as a way to celebrate the contribution made by women on the home front to the war effort. After World War II ended, National Volunteer Week declined in popularity until the 1960s when it revived and eventually began gaining popularity in the United States as well.

National Volunteer Week in the United States was first established via Presidential Proclamation 4288, signed by Richard Nixon in 1974.

Former President George H. W. Bush showed his support of American Volunteering in his 1991 State of the Union Address, commending "a volunteer's generous gesture", and calling it "an idea that is simply right."

== Events ==
A National Volunteer Week new proclamation has been issued by the American President each year since the holiday's inception.

The manner of celebration for national volunteer week varies, but many organizations host special events to help engage their local communities in volunteering and make them aware of opportunities that are available year-round.

During this week, news media feature volunteer activities in news reports.

== Recent Trends and Impact ==
In Canada, participation in volunteering has seen a decline in recent years. According to Statistics Canada, the overall volunteer rate (formal and informal) dropped from 79% in 2018 to about 73% in 2023. Total volunteer hours also fell from roughly 5.0 billion hours in 2018 to 4.1 billion in 2023, an 18% decrease, with average hours per volunteer declining as well.

The data highlights the continuing importance of initiatives like National Volunteer Week in encouraging volunteer engagement and raising awareness about the social and economic contributions of volunteers.

== Awards ==
In Canada the government has created the Prime Minister's Volunteer Awards, which recognizes and encourages volunteers across the nation. These are awarded each year during National Volunteer Week. Provincial awards are also presented to youth volunteers.

In the United States, the President's Volunteer Service Award is presented each year during National Volunteer week by various organizations to their members who have completed 500+ hours of volunteer service for adults. Young adults may earn the award with 250 hours of service while children may earn it with 100 hours.

The Daily Point of Light Award is awarded each weekday through Points of Light to recognize a person contributing to their community. This award is publicized during both National Volunteer Week and during the Points of Light Tribute Awards, which are held annually.

== Benefits of volunteering ==
Besides the benefits to society, scientific studies have shown that individuals who volunteer enjoy psychological and physical benefits, including increased satisfaction, improved sense of belonging, lower blood pressure, increased protection from Alzheimer's, and decreased mortality.

It is estimated that in Canada 13 million people, or half the adult population, volunteer some of their time.

Volunteer work can also be used to leverage valuable experiences where work experience is lacking, or to build on an area of interest and expertise when writing a resume for work or applying to schools.

Benefits of volunteer work are enjoyed by the community effected, but also by the volunteers themselves, in knowing that they contributed to the betterment of society in some way.
