= Presidential proclamation =

Statement issued by a US president on a matter of public policy

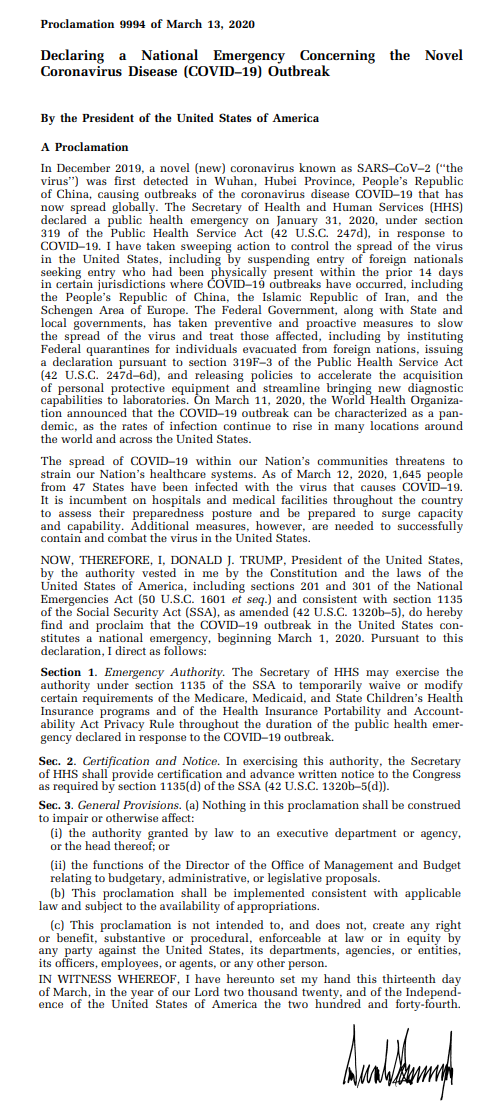
Presidential proclamation 9994, of March 13, 2020 regarding the COVID-19 pandemic, setting forth U.S. policy for "additional measures" to "contain and combat the virus", as published in the Federal Register

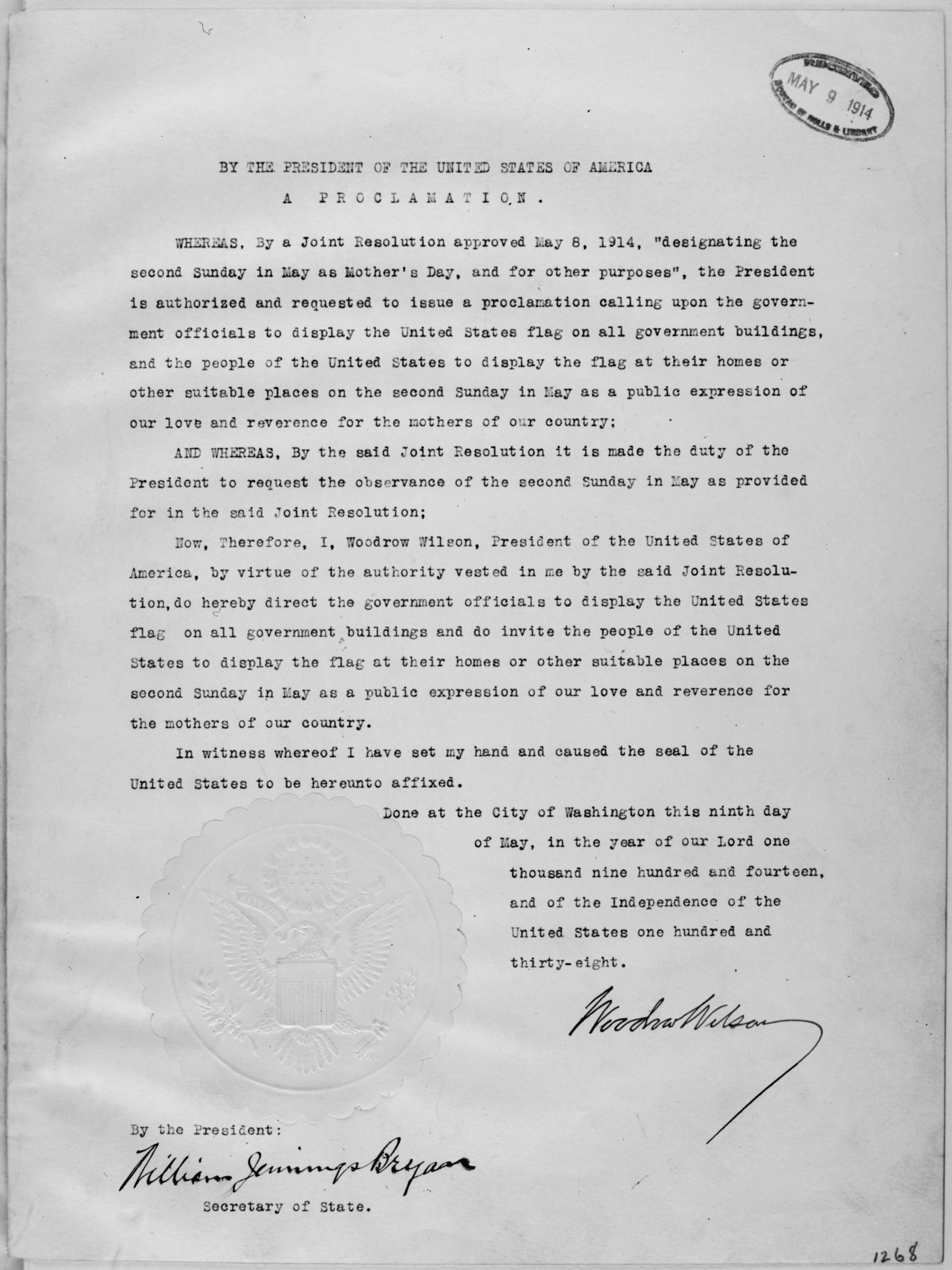
Presidential proclamation 1268 of May 9, 1914 regarding Mother's Day

The text of presidential proclamation 9552 of December 9, 2016 regarding the lowering of flags because of the death of John Glenn, as published in the Federal Register

In the United States, a presidential proclamation is a statement issued by the president of the United States on an issue of public policy. It is a type of presidential directive.

== Details ==
A presidential proclamation is an instrument that:

- states a condition,
- declares a law and requires obedience,
- recognizes an event, or
- triggers the implementation of a law, by recognizing that the circumstances described in the law have been realized.

Proclamations issued by the president fall into two broad categories:

1. "ceremonial" proclamations, that designate special observances or celebrate national holidays, and
2. "substantive" proclamations, that usually relates to the conduct of foreign affairs and other sworn executive duties. These may be, but are not limited to, matters of international trade, the execution of set export controls, the establishment of tariffs, or the reservation of federal lands for the benefit of the public in some manner.

Unless authorized by the United States Congress, a presidential proclamation does not have the force of law. If an Act of Congress is passed that would take effect upon the happening of a contingent event, and the president later proclaims that the event happened, the proclamation would then have the force of law.

Presidential proclamations are often dismissed as a practical tool for policy making because they are considered to be largely ceremonial or symbolic. The administrative weight of these proclamations is upheld because they are often specifically authorized by congressional statute, making them "delegated unilateral powers". Their issuances have occasionally led to important political and historical consequences in the development of the United States. George Washington's Proclamation of Neutrality in 1793 and Abraham Lincoln's Emancipation Proclamation in 1863 were some of America's most famous presidential proclamations in that regard. The legal weight of presidential proclamations suggests their importance to presidential governance.

Other more recent policy-based proclamations have also made a substantial impact on economic and domestic policy, including Bill Clinton's declaration of federal lands for national monuments and George W. Bush's declaration of the areas affected by Hurricane Katrina as disaster areas.

Proclamations are also used, often contentiously, to grant presidential pardons. Recent notable pardon proclamations are Gerald Ford's pardon of former President Richard Nixon (1974), Jimmy Carter's pardon of Vietnam War draft evaders (Proclamation 4483, 1977), and George W. Bush's clemency of Scooter Libby's prison sentence (2007).

Although less significant in terms of public policy, proclamations are also used ceremonially by presidents to honor a group or situation or to call attention to certain issues or events. For instance, George H. W. Bush issued a proclamation to honor veterans of World War II, and Ronald Reagan called attention to the health of the nation's eyes by proclaiming a Save Your Vision Week and issued Proclamation 5497, which recognized National Theatre Week.

== See also ==
- Executive order
- List of national monuments of the United States
- List of observances in the United States by presidential proclamation
