= Sexual Assault Awareness Month =

Annual awareness campaign

- Also called: SAAM
- Liturgical color: Teal
- Type: International
- Duration: 1 month
- Frequency: Annual
- Related to: Day of Action, Denim Day

Sexual Assault Awareness Month (SAAM) is an annual campaign to raise public awareness about sexual assault and educate communities and individuals on how to prevent sexual violence in the United States. It is observed in April.

Each year during the month of April, state, territory, tribal and community-based organizations, rape crisis centers, government agencies, businesses, campuses and individuals plan events and activities to highlight sexual violence as a public health, human rights and social justice issue and reinforce the need for prevention efforts.

The theme, slogan, resources and materials for the national SAAM campaign are coordinated by the National Sexual Violence Resource Center each year with assistance from anti-sexual assault organizations throughout the United States.

== History ==
The 1970s saw a significant growth for prevention and awareness of sexual violence across the country, following the general trend of social activism throughout the decade. Moving beyond awareness of the issue, the Bay Area Women Against Rape opened in 1971 as the nation's first rape crisis center offering immediate victim services. With this heightened awareness of sexual violence, state coalitions began to form, beginning with Pennsylvania Coalition Against Rape in 1975.

As early as 1975, Take Back the Night marches rallied women in organized protest against rape and sexual assault. These marches protested the violence and fear that women encountered walking the streets at night. Over time these events coordinated into a movement across the United States and Europe. Because of this movement broader activities to raise awareness of violence against women began to occur.

In the early 1980s, activists used October to raise awareness of violence against women and domestic violence awareness became the main focus. In the late 1980s, the National Coalition Against Sexual Assault (NCASA) informally polled state sexual assault coalitions to determine the preferred date for a national Sexual Assault Awareness Week. A week in April was selected. By the late 1990s, many advocates began coordinating activities and events throughout the month of April, advancing the idea of a nationally recognized month for sexual violence awareness and prevention activities. SAAM was first observed nationally in April 2001.

Survivors, advocates, and state coalitions mobilized around the creation and implementation of the Violence Against Women Act in 1994. This bill was the first national law requiring law enforcement to treat gender violence as a crime rather than a private family matter. VAWA was also designed to strengthen legal protections for victims of domestic violence and sexual violence as well as expand services to survivors and their children

The National Sexual Violence Resource Center was established in 2000 by the Pennsylvania Coalition Against Rape and the Center for Disease Control. In 2001, the NSVRC coordinated the first formally recognized national Sexual Assault Awareness Month campaign, and still facilitates it today. In 2005, the campaign shifted to prevention of sexual violence and the first tool kits were sent out to coalitions and rape crisis centers across the country. Awareness for the campaign culminated in 2009 when Barack Obama was the first president to officially proclaim April as Sexual Assault Awareness Month.

== Color and symbol ==
State, territory, and tribal sexual violence coalitions were polled in 2000 by the Resource Sharing Project (RSP) and the NSVRC to determine that the color blue was the preferred color for sexual assault awareness and prevention and that April was the preferred month to coordinate national sexual assault awareness activities. The teal ribbon was adopted as a symbol of sexual assault awareness and prevention.

== Activities and Events ==
=== Day of Action ===
The first Tuesday in April is the SAAM Day of Action and provides an opportunity for everyone to take action in preventing sexual violence.

=== The Clothesline Project ===
Beginning in 1990 in Massachusetts, The Clothesline Project features t-shirts created by survivors of violence, or created in honor of someone who has experienced violence. The Clothesline Project serves as a visual reminder of the impact of incest, domestic violence, and sexual violence.

=== Take Back the Night ===
Take Back the Night is an international event that began in the early 1970s in response to sexual assaults and violence against women. Local communities have organized TBTN marches and rallies to unify individuals against violence in their communities. TBTN can include a candlelight vigil, a rally, a survivor speak out, and a large scale public march.

=== Walk a Mile in Her Shoes ===
Created in 2001, Walk a Mile in Her Shoes is an international men's march to stop rape, sexual assault, and gender violence. The event helps to bring community awareness of sexual violence and have everyone involved in the conversation.

=== Denim Day ===
Peace Over Violence facilitates a Wednesday in April as Denim Day as a symbol of protest against misconceptions around sexual assault. The event was originally created in response to an Italian Supreme Court case in which a rape conviction was overruled because the victims tight jeans implied consent.

== 2018 Campaign Theme ==
In 2018, SAAM celebrated its 17th anniversary with the theme Embrace Your Voice to inform individuals on how they can use their words to promote safety, respect, and equality to stop sexual violence before it happens. More specifically, individuals can embrace their voices to show their support for survivors, stand up to victim blaming, shut down rape jokes, correct harmful misconceptions, promote everyday consent, and practice healthy communications with children. NSVRC developed four key resources for this campaign including fact-sheets, Embrace Your Voice, Everyday Consent, Healthy Communications with Kids, and Understanding Sexual Violence.

== 2019 Campaign Theme ==
The 2019 SAAM theme was I Ask.

== See also ==
- Take Back the Night
