= Anti-rape movement =

Sociopolitical movement

The anti-rape movement is a sociopolitical movement which is part of the movement seeking to combat violence against and the abuse of women.

The movement seeks to change community attitudes to violence against women, such as attitudes of entitlement to sex and victim blaming, and attitudes of women such as self-blame for violence. It seeks to promote changes to rape laws or laws of evidence which enable rapists to avoid penalties because, for example, victims are discouraged from reporting assaults, or because the rapist is entitled to immunity or because a rapist (as a defendant) is capable in law of denigrating the victim. The movement has been successful in jurisdictions, though many attitudes still persist, and despite changes to laws and significant increases in reporting of assaults, violence against women still persists at high levels.

The movement came about in the late 1960s and early 1970s, when new concepts of rape arose out of second wave feminism and the reevaluation of women's daily lives socially and with regard to the social institutions with which they interact. Prior to this reexamination, rape had been viewed as a "sex crime carried out by pathological men", who were unable to control their own sexual desires. Feminists began to emphasize the role of power dynamics specifically with regard to the perpetration of rape as a crime committed primarily by men against women. This revised definition of rape was reframed from the perspective of the victim. The act of rape was asserted to be a way in which societal gender roles, the way someone acts out either masculinity or femininity, were enforced and the hierarchy of power placing males above females was maintained. Rape was thus defined as a form of violence used to ensure male power, a form of social control over women and children. Known as the "anti-rape" or "rape prevention" movement, it was founded with the conceptions that sexual violence and violence against women more generally, is a tool of social control used to keep women in a subordinate position to men and that women need to take action, that aids victims of sexual violence to become "survivors" of violence instead of victims. The anti-rape movement continues, with growing awareness in the United States public about the concept of rape culture, coinciding with the increasing popularity of feminism.

== History ==
=== Origins ===
Beginning in the late 1960s, violence against women became a salient topic of interest within the second-wave feminist movement. Through the anti-rape movement, an offshoot of the women's movement, the public was made aware of sexual violence as an important social problem deserving of attention. Sexual violence refers to both rape and sexual assault. As early as 1970, feminists began engaging in consciousness raising groups, which involved sharing personal experiences women have had with sexual violence with the wider public. In 1971, the New York Radical Feminists sponsored the first events specifically regarding sexual violence as a social problem, the first of which was a speak-out, used to attach personal stories with the cause. On January 24, 1971, this group held the first Speak-Out, which approximately 300 people attended at St. Clement's Episcopal Church in New York, and this speak-out was followed by a conference about rape on April 12, 1971. Women would come to a "speak-out" specifically to share their own experiences with an audience and to raise their voices, to literally speak out against sexual violence. These events helped increase public awareness of sexual violence as an issue deserving of attention.

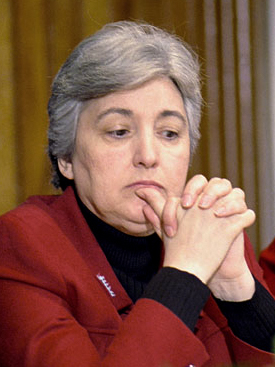
Eleanor Smeal, President of the Feminist Majority, and a three-term past president of the National Organization for Women (NOW), seated at the head table of the National Press Club during a speech by Kim Gandy, current president of NOW

During the subsequent two years, feminist theorizing about rape continued. In 1975, Susan Brownmiller wrote one of the most influential pieces of literature about sexual assault of this period: Against Our Will: Men, Women, and Rape. In this book, Brownmiller made a direct connection between women's fear and sexual aggression, describing that sexual violence is used by men to intimidate women and keep them fearful. As the movement was able to connect a pattern of violence to personal experiences, slogans began to form, such as "the personal is political" and "there are no individual solutions".

The psychological trauma from rape was generally ignored by medicinal and psychiatric professionals up until the 1950s and 1960s. In 1970 Sandra Sutherland and Donald J. Scherl published the first substantial study of the psychological effects of rape on its victims in the American Journal of Orthopsychiatry.

The year 1972 marks an important milestone in the anti-rape movement due to the formation of two influential organizations: Bay Area Women Against Rape (BAWAR) in Berkeley, California, and the Washington D.C. Rape Crisis Center. BAWAR started by first putting together packets of information concerning important safety information, such as suggestions to follow when hitchhiking, samples of the paper materials that they use (i.e., memos to hospitals or police departments requesting change, requests for donations), and medical pamphlets for survivors of rape. This center also made strides to obtain city funding for their efforts to start a 24-hour crisis line, pay a part-time staff member, and fund an office, though it is unknown whether that funding was received by 1973. A good case study illustrating how many Rape crisis centers actually came into being is the case of the still-active Rape Crisis Center (YWCA) of the greater Toledo area. In 1972, one woman in Toledo started helping rape victims out of her home and the local law enforcement recognized her effectiveness and related victims to her care. From this individual, grassroots effort grew the YWCA H.O.P.E. center, a vibrant and still-active rape crisis center.

Also in 1972, the Washington D.C. Rape Crisis Center formed and began running the first telephone crisis line for victims of sexual violence to call, which has served as an example for future rape crisis centers. This center was the first rape crisis center within the United States. In 1972, the center received approximately 20 calls a day, and aside from the crisis line, the women operating this center offered an array of services, including offering legal and medical advice, emotional support, accompaniment to the hospital or law enforcement agencies, and shelter to those who called their office. By 1973, the center also had started distributing a newsletter nationally, helping to support and legitimize the anti-rape movement then gaining speed. The Washington D.C. Rape Crisis Center along with BAWAR represented two "national networking hubs" for the anti-rape movement.

The national anti-rape movement was largely decentralized and spread across the United States. It was made-up of several main organizations which constituted "hubs" for the movement, like BAWAR and the Washington, D.C. Rape Crisis Center, which acted as crucial networking sites for the movement, as well as a wide array of less influential centers spread throughout the US. These less influential organizations remained connected to the movement often through the active feminist press of this time. The national movement provided local movement organizations with support. The first national coalition among these centers did not form until 1974, with the creation of the Feminist Alliance Against Rape (FAAR) in Washington, D.C.

In the early stages of the anti-rape movement, the movement's foci included "…law enforcement behavior and legal changes, hospital practices and counseling, self-defense and community education." The National Organization for Women (NOW) started working on legislative reform at the national level during the mid-1970s. This organization was the first to initiate legislative reform, helping to lead all 50 states to change their laws in various ways within the decade. These reformed laws served to encourage those who have been raped to report these crimes and improved methods for prosecuting perpetrators of this violence. Specifically, by 1980 most states in the US had changed their laws to:

1. Include that it is illegal for a spouse to rape their spouse.

2. Include "rape shield laws," which in part serve to limit using a victim's sexual history in court to potentially be used against them.

3. Make it unnecessary to have a witness of the rape.

4. Change the age constituting statutory rape from 10 to 12.

5. Alter the definition constituting consent to demonstrate "…the difference between consent and submission (when, on account of fear, the victim does not physically resist)" and show that there is a difference between giving someone consent (agreeing to engage in a sexual act) and not giving someone consent to engage in a sexual act (for example, a person cannot give consent when they are passed out).

In 1975, the National Center for the Prevention and Control of Rape at the National Institute of Mental Health was formed. The creation of this organization led to a wide expansion of research concerning sexual assault and rape; it released millions of dollars to fund research regarding both sexual violence and how to better treat the psychosocial and mental health problems of survivors.

As rape was increasingly demonstrated to be a societal problem by the anti-rape movement, women worked together in feminist grassroots organizations to start the first rape crisis centers. These first centers were largely formed by radical feminists, as "…the goal initially was not reform, but a total transformation of ideologies, power relationships, and the existing social structure," and they relied mostly on volunteers. However, by 1979 there were more than 1,000 rape crisis centers across the US, and these centers had started to shift away from this feminist ideology to a more liberal approach seeking reform and connections with other agencies that could aid survivors. Between 1979 and the mid-1980s, this shift toward a more liberal approach continued as rape crisis centers started to be both institutionalized and professionalized, acquiring state grant funding that enabled many centers to hire staff.

=== 1980s ===
Worldwide, legislative reform to protect (potential) victims of rape began to be adopted under pressure from the feminist movement and their sympathisers. Marital rape was increasingly criminalised, while marry-your-rapist laws were repealed one by one after 1980. The first such move came in Italy in 1981, over a decade after the bride kidnapping of Franca Viola. Her late 1960s case created national controversy, resulting in a gradual moral evolution against the custom of so-called "rehabilitating marriages", in which a survivor's "honour" was considered restored if she married her rapist.

=== 2010s ===
In 2011 Usha Vishwakarma helped found Red Brigade Trust in Lucknow, India, an organization that holds self-defense classes for women and helps spread awareness.

In 2013, UNC Chapel Hill students Annie E. Clark and Andrea Pino filed a complaint against the university with the U.S. Department of Education's Office for Civil Rights, based on Title IX. The Department of Education, as a result, launched an investigation into how the university handled sexual assault cases.

In September 2014 Emma Sulkowicz, a senior visual arts student at Columbia University, began protesting what they describe as the university's mishandling of a complaint against a fellow student who allegedly raped them by carrying their dorm room mattress with them every day. The protest was a performance art piece for their senior thesis entitled Carry That Weight. The performance ended with Sulkowicz's graduation. Sulkowicz's protest was reported by major news outlets including New York Magazine, which featured a portrait of Sulkowicz with their mattress on the cover of its Sept. 22 issue. In the cover article, Vanessa Grigoriadis described Sulkowicz as "the poster girl for the anti-rape movement". Sulkowicz inspired the formation of Carrying the Weight Together, "a coalition of college students and activists who are working to support survivors of sexual and domestic violence". The group organized the Carry That Weight Day of Action, which involved 130 anti-sexual violence demonstrations held across the United States.

In October 2017, following allegations of sexual assault against film producer Harvey Weinstein, the Me Too movement began to spread virally on social media after a Tweet by actress Alyssa Milano. The movement is a demonstration of solidarity and awareness among survivors of sexual assault.

== Legislation ==
=== Common law ===
Rape, under common law, was initially defined as "the unlawful carnal knowledge of another person, and the elements of force and resistance were determinative." The common law definition of rape was used for many years and it was interpreted in different ways by each state. Under common law, it was often the case that in rape trials, the victim felt that they were the one on trial due to the deep interrogation into their background. It was also part of the law that a husband could not be accused of raping his wife based on marital exemption. According to common law, it was required that the claimant could prove that they resisted, that the complaint was prompt, and proof that they did not consent. Also, part of the common law was the doctrine of prompt complaint. The doctrine of prompt complaint required that the victims report their claim to the community and to police promptly following the attack in order to be considered legitimate. Lawmakers felt that it made sense for the victim to want to report the case as soon as possible in hopes of finding the assailant. Unfortunately, not much was known about the psychological effects following an attack and rape trauma syndrome which changes one's behaviors. The Doctrine of Prompt Complaint was actually considered one of the top three criteria for convicting a defendant of rape according to jurors. Prior to the anti-rape movement, the laws in the legal system did not place much legitimization on the claims of the victims, making them hesitant to even consider reporting a rape.

=== Role of women ===
The anti-rape movement began by women breaking the silence on the issues of rape and the damages incurred as a result. The feminist movement first began to take notice of the low levels of rape convictions, especially in New York, and realized that rape was not taken seriously in the court of law from the victim's side. The movement then began to fight not only for rape law reform, but in many cases it was fighting for the repeal and revision of such laws. In New York in 1971, one of the strictest states on rape claims, their law forced victims to provide evidence for force, penetration, and identity of the perpetrator all before the case could even go to trial. These harsh guidelines and requirements made women feel unsafe in their own neighborhoods, in their own homes, and out on the streets. It was groups such as the Women for a Free Future that spoke out for law reforms to protect women and their rights. Part of the movement was aided by the increasing numbers of women involved in law. In the late 1960s, women made up for only 3% of the total number of lawyers in the United States. Gradually, more and more women began entering law school and bringing their feminist ideals with them. More and more women's groups became involved in the fight not to change laws, but to repeal them. The Feminist Anti-Rape Squad planned a meeting in 1972 to discuss what measures would express to lawmakers that they wanted the laws to be repealed. In 1973, the Women's Anti-Rape Coalition started a campaign through media and legislation to bring attention to the problems within the law. Later in 1973, joint committee hearings were held to begin to discuss the possibility of repeal, but the Legal Aid Society kept the existing laws in place.

=== Beginning of changes ===
There were not any major changes in rape law legislation until the American Law Institute (ALI) drafted the Moral Penal Code (MPC) in 1955, but it was not until 1980 when the code was published. Following its publication, many states became influenced to make some changes to their laws, with the biggest change being the redefinition of "rape". Although the MPC added "forced anal penetration" to the definition of rape, it still required the prompt complaint provision. It is notable that the MPC's Criminal Law Advisory Board, which determined these laws, included only one female member (Florence M. Kelly).

=== Rape shield laws ===
One of the more important introductions to rape laws was the addition of rape shield laws. In California, the trial of People v. Plotkin used the complainant's sexual history to place doubt into the jurors' minds on the credibility of her claims. Assault on credibility was a common tactic used in rape trials. Such investigation of the sexual background of complainants made them reluctant to go to trial. The enactment of rape shield laws helped to provide further protection for rape victims during trial. These laws were created to restrict the past sexual history of the victim from being used against them during the trial. These laws were proposed because it was feared that jurors would judge a complainant based on their history and use that for judgment on their current credibility and moral character. Eventually, President Jimmy Carter signed the legislation that allowed rape shield laws to be put into place to protect the victim. Also, the acknowledgement of rape trauma syndrome (RTS) helped jurors to gain an understanding of the actions of complainants following rape. RTS describes post-rape behavior that may include not reporting the rape promptly and many other psychological and emotional damage that resulted.

=== Changes in law ===
Changes to state laws began when the bill that would remove the requirement of corroboration was repealed in Congress unanimously. Following a national conference in 1973, changes began to take place more rapidly beginning with the creation of the National Rape Task Force (NOWRTF) which was a subgroup of the National Organization for Women (NOW). The next step for activists was to create a sample of how they thought rape laws should be written. One of the most successful repeal attempts took place in Michigan in 1974. Michigan created the Criminal Sexual Conduct Law bill which removed spousal exception, lowered evidentiary burdens, redefined rape, and other reforms. On the other hand, Georgia had not repealed its law of spousal exemption until 1996, although most states had repealed theirs earlier in the 1990s. By 1980, all of the states had made, or at least considered making some changes. The example set by Michigan highly encouraged all other states to take action against rape. By 1980, there were over 400 rape crisis centers in the United States and laws had been changed to give the victim more leverage and voice during trials. As rape crisis center reforms increased and picked up supporters, as did the rape law reform groups.

The four main changes made to most state laws were:

1. The definition of rape changed. Changes to the definition of rape allowed for the possibility of a male being the victim of rape. The revised definition considered rape to include forced sexual contact in terms of vaginal, anal, or oral sex.
2. The requirement that the victim resists the assailant was eliminated. This protected women with disabilities since many are not physically able to ward off an assailant.
3. The requirement that a third party corroborates the claim of rape was eliminated.
4. Rape Shield Laws were implemented.

The new federal definition of rape is defined as, "non-consensual sexual intercourse 'by force, threat, or intimidation.'" Federal law has divided rape into two categories: the common law rape of an adult and statutory rape which is assaulting a minor. According to federal law, the marital exemption does not exist.

In the Middle East, the Campaign Against Lebanese Rape Law - Article 522 was launched in December 2016 in order to abolish the article that permitted Lebanese rapists to escape prosecution if they married the victim.

=== Concerns ===
Lawmakers and the public alike had some initial concerns about changing rape laws. One of the biggest fears was that by changing the law, more accusations would arise and that wrongful convictions would be made. Another concern was that by providing women with more control during the trial, they might become overwhelmed in the process and end up dropping the case even though a conviction may have been possible. As of now, evidence has shown that there has only been a slight increase in the number of accusations, but for the most part, the probability of coming to a conviction has remained relatively stable. One of the biggest changes is that the penalties are harsher now than they have been historically.

== Rape crisis centers ==
The anti-rape movement sets up rape crisis centers which seek to influence in their respective communities. These centers seek to connect with all groups of people and make their services accessible to the public and to particular minority groups who may have an increased risk of experiencing difficulty in accessing medical and other basic needs.

=== Education ===
Rape crisis centres offer education and outreach programs and workshops to the public, largely to prevent sexual assault from occurring. They cater their programs and workshops towards schools, community organizations, churches, and clubs, and increase awareness of the commonality of sexual assault, how to recognize it, which assertive steps to take in order to reduce the risk of experiencing it, and knowing about local resources and options in the event that one experiences sexual assault. Educational outreach programs are designed for specific age groups ranging from children to adults.

Educational programs with the goal of preventing sexual violence through education and awareness can be introduced to children at an early age. Kindergarten to second grade aged children are taught to identify 'good' and 'bad' forms of touch, and how to respond to unwanted forms of touch. Older elementary school-aged children are presented with strategies of how to say "no" to inappropriate conduct. The information is presented to the students in an age-appropriate fashion, such as through hand puppets or videos.

Middle and high school-aged students learn through video and discuss how to distinguish healthy relationships from harmful ones, and what constitutes sexual harassment, even within a relationship. Students are taught about the three forms of sexual harassment (physical, visual and verbal), and that rape is about power and control rather than sex. High school students learn the definition of consent while examining different kinds of rape: stranger rape, date/acquaintance rape, and statutory rape.

Adult programs incorporate a wide variety of information into their curricula. Some common programs inform attendees about the local rape crisis centers, discuss the definition of date rape, explore how a sexual assault survivor is affected in terms of their religious beliefs, and provide steps that parents can take to keep their children safe from sexual violation. Other programs focus on media violence, the laws concerning sexual violence, and victim empathy and blaming. Many centers have a program related to substance abuse or date rape drugs.

Sexual violence prevention is not the only focal point of rape crisis center education programs. Programs and groups are also established for those who have experienced sexual assault. These support groups are usually divided by sex or gender and are designed to create a safe atmosphere for sharing and listening. Groups for survivors can explore self-esteem, assertiveness and healing. These groups may also examine emotional and psychological issues that can arise with the experience of sexual violence. Emotional and psychological focal points include fear, self-doubt, guilt, anger, shame, self-blame, or denial. Selective rape crisis centers offer programs for couples who seek to actively end abuse within their relationship.

Many rape crisis centers offer self-defense classes for girls and women. Rape crisis centers who host these classes offer them at a regular interval for a minimum charge. Awareness, assertiveness, and physical technique are three basic keys to self-protection. Awareness involves assessing one's surroundings and situations to determine potential levels of safety or threat. Students of the class are taught to use their body language and voice to assert their awareness and self-protection in ways that would discourage potential attackers. The physical techniques used for self-defense incorporate martial arts methods of defense.

=== Outreach and awareness ===
April is Sexual Assault Awareness Month, in which rape crisis centers host community events. Rape crisis centers host events to promote advocacy, awareness, and empowerment to sexual assault survivors and others who are interested in sexual assault prevention. These events are often creative in expressions, such as Shout Out Against Violence!, during which survivors of sexual assault and their allies can read performance pieces in an open-mic style evening of stories and thoughts related to sexual violence. Rape crisis centers sometimes use the month of April to work within the county schools. The Alachua County Victim Services & Rape Crisis Center, for example, holds a "Respect Your Date" contest in the county high schools during the first week of April.

Special events unique to their respective communities are hosted by rape crisis centers nationwide. Creativity and the arts are used as an effective method of local advocacy and awareness through these diverse events. The rape crisis center in Santa Barbara, California, hosts a radio show six times a year to openly discuss issues concerning sexual and domestic violence, child abuse, and other forms of oppression. The Orange County Rape Crisis Center has developed a conference in Spanish called "Speaking the Forbidden: A Conference about Sexual Health, Mental Health, and Human Rights". The rape crisis center in DeKalb, Georgia, uses the Clothesline Project to increase awareness of sexual violence. In the Clothesline Project, female survivors of sexual assault create T-shirts that express their feelings on sexual violence. This artistic project is permanently displayed at the DeKalb Rape Crisis Center. Cleveland County Rape Crisis Center in Ohio hosts "'Girls Kick Butt': An Empowerment Conference Model for Adolescent Girls". "Girls Kick Butt" teaches empowerment by guiding girls and young women to choose healthy behaviors. Participants learn how to lessen the chance of sexual assault, and engage in activities that encourage building self-esteem. The Rape Crisis Center of South Dakota has held performances including The Vagina Monologues and A Long Walk Home, which delves into the area of women of color and rape.

One myth that rape crisis centers work against is that rape and sexual violence is solely a women's issue. In response to a societal mentality that rape revolved around female victims, organizations such as rape crisis centers established programs that focused on the dynamic that males were the ones overwhelmingly committing the crime of rape. Such groups seek to change the male mentality into one that acknowledges their power to stop rape. One subgroup that works through some rape crisis centers is the organization "Men Can Stop Rape", which targets young men in reforming their ideas about masculinity, strength, and violence. Men are empowered by their dedication to a non-violent lifestyle as an ally to women. The organization has made extensive use of posters and other social marketing tools. "Men Can Stop Rape" is a nonprofit organization from Washington, D.C. The organization uses their theme "My Strength is Not for Hurting" to promote their Rape Prevention Education program, which emphasizes building healthy relationships. With the assistance of local rape crisis centers, "Men Can Stop Rape" clubs have been established at several high schools located in California. Another group that works against rape and sexual violence, focusing more on research-based approaches to prevention, is One in Four. One in Four has chapters of its organization on college campuses and military bases across the United States and focuses its approach on building survivor empathy and bystander intervention.

Rape crisis centers seek to ensure the best care for their patients by striving to be inclusive in their outreach programs to all groups of people. Centers acknowledge how sexual assault might be experienced by different people and different groups of people. Men, members of the LGBT community, sex workers, the homeless, Latinas, low-income people, people who are physically disabled, and non-native English speakers can attend groups specific to their needs through many crisis centers. Although the last few decades have seen a rise in awareness concerning these issues of sexual violence, some anti-rape programs are facing cuts, and anti-rape advocates worry that a movement that had much steam is in danger of losing preeminence in the public eye.

== Societal criticism by the anti-rape movement in America ==
Because feminists and anti-rape advocates have varying perspectives on rape, they also have different views on the main challenges and opposition facing the anti-rape movement.

While radical feminist views are often attacked (by non-feminists and equity feminists among many others) a more accepted theme in feminist and anti-rape literature is that of the prevalence of "rape culture". This concept is phrased by Marilyn French, who wrote, "The media treat male assaults on women like rape, beating, and murder of wives and female lovers, or male incest with children, as individual aberrations...obscuring the fact that all male violence toward women is part of a concerted campaign." Other feminists and anti-rape advocates take a different approach to what constitutes "rape culture", focusing less on ideas like French's "concerted campaign" in which all males are complicit and more on what they see as institutional problems in American society. They point out sociocultural conditioning from childhood on that rears boys to be susceptible to becoming rapists and girls to accept victimization. These problems include the theological and social beliefs of the Christian Right (and other conservative religious groups), the handling of rape victims by police, by the medical industry, by the courts and judges, and the problem of the acceptance of pornography and attitudes to women in American society.

=== Criticisms of the police ===
Many feminists and anti-rape advocates see a systemic problem with the way rape is handled immediately after it is reported to police. Advocates in Rape Crisis Centers report that very often police are the first hurdle many rape victims have to deal with right after a sexual assault occurs. The Ann Arbor Women's Center, a particularly active advocacy center founded in 1971, sees the societal problems that shape males in American culture as manifesting themselves hideously when rape victims report to often all-male police forces, writing in Freedom from Rape that:

Police officers, by and large, are male. Their views, like those of other men, have been shaped by the society in which they live. It is quite possible that a policeman was raised in a typical American home, he developed a value system that typifies women as gentle, quiet, and sweet. He probably believes that women would do best to stay at home in the evening unless accompanied by a husband or proper escort.

In Freedom from Rape, the Ann Arbor Women's Center goes on to argue that such prejudiced police officers (conscious or such prejudice or not) make value judgments about women who report the rape as occurring under circumstances that could be judged by some as morally dubious or practically imprudent (i.e., leaving a bar alone late at night or walking home alone at night). If the woman comes across as "outspoken, independent, and/or 'promiscuous'" she may be judged as a "that kind" of girl who was, in reality, "asking" to be raped. Nancy Gager and Cathleen Schurr argue in Sexual Assault: Confronting Rape in America that such responses from law enforcement were indeed commonplace.

Another deep problem many feminists and anti-rape activists see with law enforcement is an inability to understand the true nature of rape. Because of their maleness, Gager and Schurr proclaim that "Few policemen have any understanding of the complexity of emotions felt by rape victims, just as they have little understanding of women in general." Many feminists also feel that policemen (indeed most men) fail to recognize what they see as a basic truth about rape – that it is about power and not sex, "an act of terror", not of lust.

Whether the police even believe the rape victim's story or seek to report the incident are another matter, and one in which many rape victims report difficulties and inconsistencies. Feminists and anti-rape activists often highlight systemic problems with the way police handle interviewing and questioning victims. "Victims report being leered at, humiliated, and harassed by the policemen they called for help. To many women, the police often seem more interested in explicit sexual details than in catching the rapist." In Gager and Schurr's study, they argue that some (though definitely not all) police show "rape victims the same inhumanity shown by the rapists themselves." A rape crisis center worker reported that the police often turn a blind eye to rape if it is committed by a boyfriend or fiancée, often seeing such instances as a "lover's quarrel" and preferring not to get involved. Another problem is that rape can be more difficult to prove when the victim is not physically assaulted, and this problem is compounded by what many Rape Crisis Centers see as the police's disinclination to believe women who were not outwardly harmed. Michigan's Rape Crisis Center observes that "Police go on the assumption that it didn't really happen if a woman is not noticeably physically injured." This can present unique problems for women, especially if the experience was traumatic and she has trouble recalling specific details, which some police misinterpret as dishonesty rather than genuine trauma .

While feminists and rape crisis center workers acknowledge the honorable work some police officers do to combat rapists and be advocates for victims, they also argue that there are some categorical problems with the way law enforcement officers conceive of rape and deal with rape victims. While the Gager and Schurr study was conducted in the 1970s, current anti-rape sentiment (2007) still insists there are deep problems with the way police and courts handle rape victims and rape accusations. "Rape Victims Failed by Police and Courts"

=== Criticism of the legal system ===
There are many problems that feminists and rape crisis center workers have identified regarding the treatment of rape victims once the situation gets past the police and into court. Patricia Yancey Martin, in her book Rape Work: Victims, Gender, and Emotions in Organization and Community Context identifies many of these dilemmas, working to prove the thesis that "Police, prosecutors, and judges collaborate with rapists and their defenders." Martin bases her thesis on a 1993 book by former rape prosecutor Alice Vachss, who explains how her experiences led her to believe that, for a multitude of reasons, "prosecutors and judges 'collaborate' with defense attorneys and rapists to let rapists off the hook." Vachss laments that far too often rape crisis become more of a "chess match" between competing lawyers (or the state) than any attempt to provide justice or healing for the victim.

One of the most pervasive problems identified by anti-rape advocates is the tactless, noncommittal, and ginger way that many prosecutors handle rape cases. An assistant prosecutor of rapists relates that many lawyers who become involved with rape cases have little training, sensitivity, and experience in dealing with the issue, and are disturbed by the issue and the details. Reporting anonymously, the 35-year-old man relates that many of his colleagues are "convinced through the years of prosecution folklore that rape cases can't be won … so they plead 'em and settle cheap." The very nature of rape cases causes attorneys, many of whom are working for profit, to shy away. A 37-year-old Rape Crisis Center founder and executive director, also speaking anonymously, bemoaned the fact that accused rapists are difficult to convict which causes success-driven lawyers to instead seek out and fight hard for burglary or larceny cases, because there are "no emotional issues, no time-consuming efforts and victims." In short, these types of cases are widely regarded in the legal world as "much easier to win".

Catharine MacKinnon argues that a categorical mistake that legal officials make in prosecuting rape is framing the important question to be answered by the jury and debated by the lawyers is "Did the man have reason to believe [or convincingly say he believed] the woman (girl) consented to have sex?" The question which should be asked is "Did the man use force to have sex with the woman (or girl) against her will?" Thus, the defense attorney can simply seek to build a case that the rapist thought the woman or girl consented, rather than focusing on whether or not force or date-rape agents were used. MacKinnon argues this is a profoundly wrong way to frame cases, but one that is prevalent and is sympathetic to rapists, not victims.

By the very nature of the American legal system, good cases with strong evidence have to be built in order for prosecuting attorneys to pursue them. While this may protect many innocent individuals accused of other crimes, very often it can shelter rapists, since courts are apt to err on the side of acquittal in a "his word versus hers" situation. In the opinion of many feminists and rape crisis center workers, courts and legal authorities unfairly portray rape victims as emotionally unstable, morally dubious, unpredictable, and erratic. Instead of assuming the victim is telling the truth and seeking healing and justice, rape victims are often attacked for their background (i.e., being prostitutes, heavy drinkers, or often sexually active) and assumed to be "probable liars". Advocates for rape victims point out that no matter what a woman's sexual history is, no one asks to be raped, and no one's choices, whatever their moral worth, destroy the necessity of their consent to engage in any sexual acts.

== See also ==
- Rape crisis movement
