= 1in6 =

American nonprofit organization

- Founded: 2007
- Type: 501(c)(3) non-profit organization
- Location: Los Angeles, California
- Key people: Anthony Edwards, Chairman of the Board
- Website: 1in6.org

1in6 is an American nonprofit organization that provides support and information to male survivors of sexual abuse and assault, as well as their loved ones and service providers.

In January 2007, 1in6 was founded by a group of individuals including Steve LePore, Jim Hopper, Greg LeMond, and David Lisak. Steve LePore led the organization as Executive Director from 2007 to 2018. In December 2018, following LePore's retirement, the 1in6 Board of Directors announced that Matthew Ennis would become President & Chief Executive Officer. Matthew Ennis resigned from 1in6 on September 30, 2022.

The organization partners with RAINN to provide a free and anonymous 24/7 helpline, as well as confidential weekly online support groups for male survivors. In 2016, nearly 400,000 people visited the 1in6 website. The Bristlecone Project, created by Lisak, is 1in6’s multimedia awareness campaign that features portraits and stories of a community of male survivors.

Based in Los Angeles, the organization conducts trainings for professionals, organizations, and military branches around the world, including the US Navy, US Army, US Air Force, and the US Marine Corps. 1in6 also provides technical support for various organizations including RAINN, Pennsylvania Coalition Against Rape, ECPAT International, National Sexual Violence Resource Center, Your Safe Haven, Centre County Women’s Resource Center, Men Can Stop Rape, Victim Services Incorporated, Family Services of Blair County, and all branches of the United States Military at bases around the world.

== Projects ==
In 2016, 1in6 partnered with Viacom, NO MORE, and The Joyful Heart Foundation (founded by Mariska Hargitay) to produce public service announcements featuring celebrities and highlighting the prevalence of sexual trauma among males. On March 2, 2016, the broadcast PSAs debuted on Viacom’s networks and in Times Square, during which the PSAs were visible to approximately 21 million people.

In 2018, 1in6 released a public service announcement, "Survivors of Sexual Abuse and Assault Reveal an Important Truth," in partnership with NO MORE. The NFL partially funded the PSA and Upworthy published it. Andy Langdon, founder of Good Pictures, created and directed the PSA.

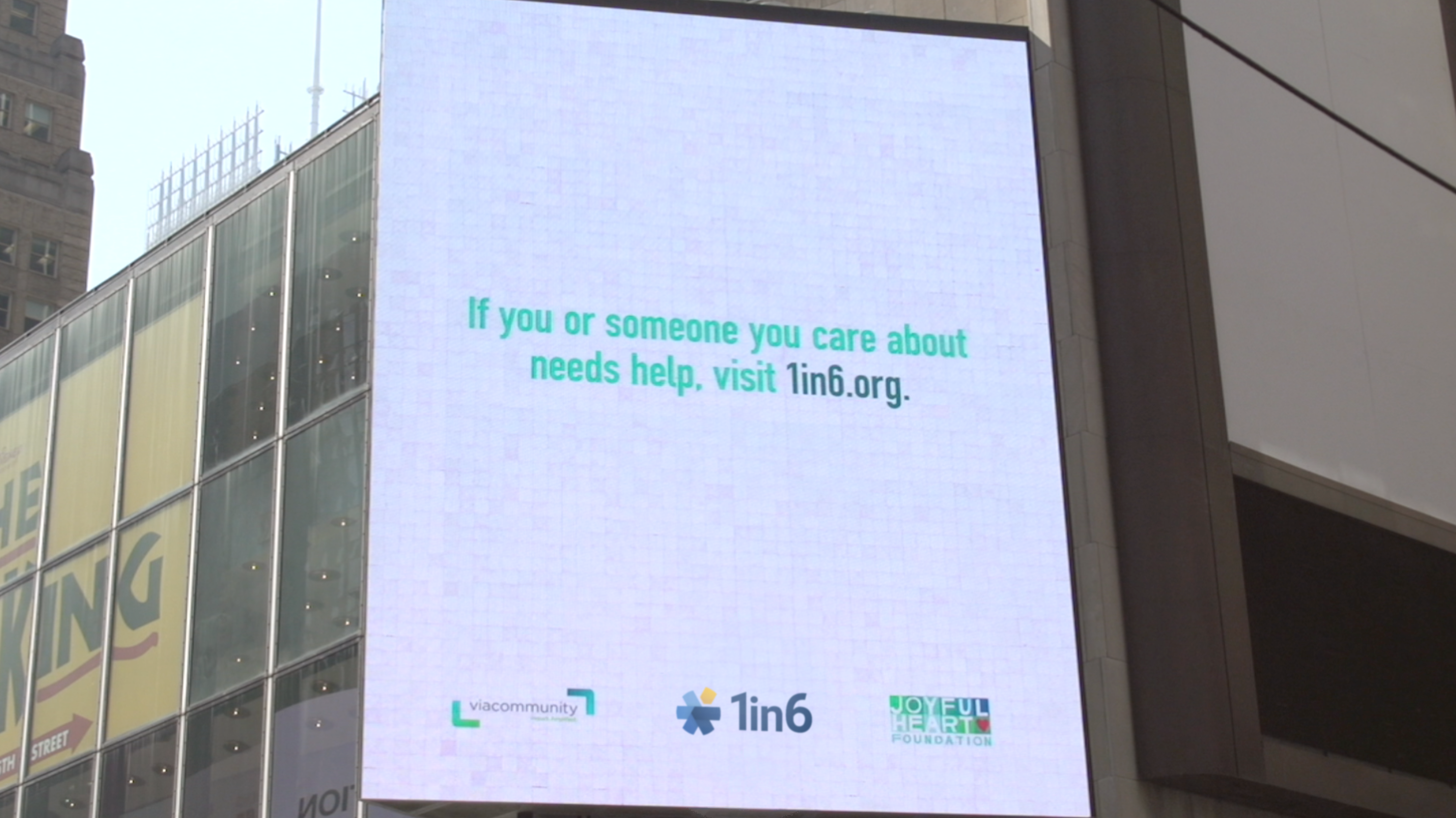
Billboard in Times Square featuring 1in6
