= Friday Nite Improvs =

Canadian live improvisational comedy television show.

Coordinates: 40.44416°N 79.95312°W

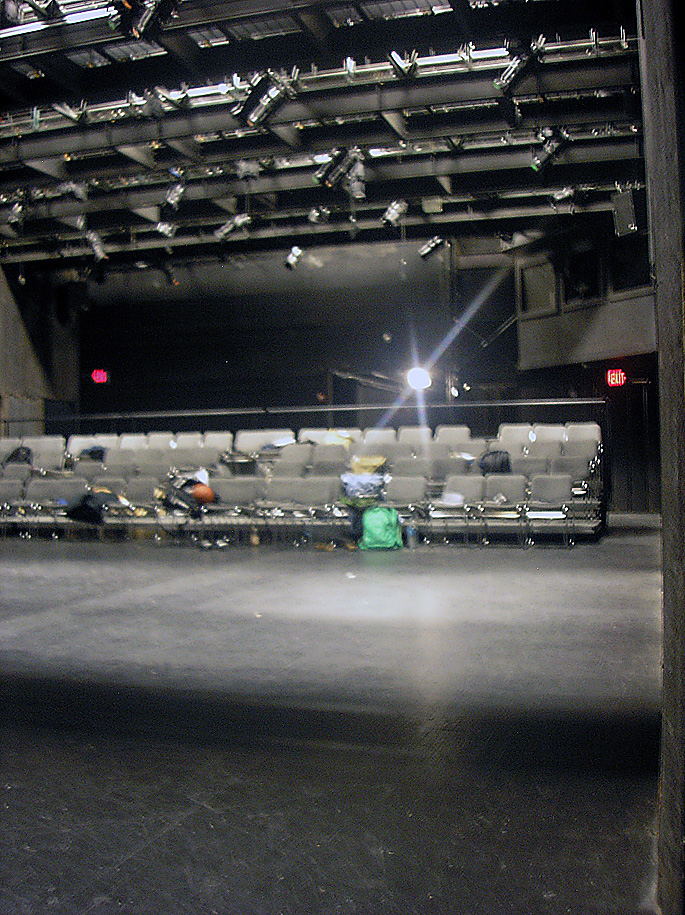
The Studio Theatre in the basement of the Cathedral of Learning is the home of Friday Nite Improvs

Friday Nite Improvs, or Friday Night Improvs (FNI), was a long-running weekly improvisational comedy show staged on the campus of the University of Pittsburgh in Pittsburgh, Pennsylvania. The show functioned as an improv jam, performed by improv actors who don't normally work together. FNI was unique in that, in addition to the audience's providing improv suggestions, the performers were all pulled from volunteers in the audience. FNI began in 1989 (37 years ago) and ended in 2014 (12 years ago). A student improv group, Ruckus, has succeeded FNI as a resident improv group on the University of Pittsburgh's campus.

Friday Nite Improvs was the longest-running theatrical/comedic production in the city of Pittsburgh. The show regularly featured actors from every improv group in Pittsburgh, and alumni have gone on to act, write, and produce for television and film.

Readers of the Pittsburgh City Paper ranked Friday Nite Improvs as the 3rd best place to see comedy in Pittsburgh in the 2004 "Best of Pittsburgh" survey behind the professional stand-up clubs The Improv and The Funnybone.

College Prowler ranked Friday Nite Improvs as the ninth best thing about Pitt.

== Show history ==
The show began in 1989 with a group of several University of Pittsburgh theater students gathering in rehearsal spaces to play improvisational theatre games. From there, the show found several homes, most notably the Pitt Theatre and the Studio Theatre in Pitt's Cathedral of Learning, its current home.

Jeffrey DeVincent attended the University of Pittsburgh's MFA program for Theatre Arts, began in 1990. DeVincent had worked closely with The Second City Artistic Director Michael Gellman at Northern Illinois University in Chicago (he was directed by Gellman in improvisation and in a live production of Kaufman and Hart's You Can't Take It With You ). DeVincent and eight fellow actors started an informal improv workshop for the undergraduate students, with Jeff directing. The group met every Friday night in various rehearsal spaces on campus — frequently Cathedral of Learning room B16/B18 — and called themselves the "Late Nite Club". This group included Chris Potocki, Dereck Walton, Barbie Williams, Shawn Williams, Fletcher Kohlhousen, Pattie Miles, Walter Herschman, and Rachel Resinski.

Admission was one dollar, and the collected money went toward the weekly post-show parties hosted by Lee Piper.

Each week, DeVincent began the show by welcoming the audience and going over the rules he had created to encourage performers: Failure is OK, No Booing, Always Welcome, Support is Encouraged, and Always Listen. He then announced that it was time to play Freeze, which Jeff believed was the foundation of all other improv games. Freeze sometimes took up the first 90 minutes or more. Occasionally the group played other games after, including the improvised cult soap operas "Corn Town" and "Shalico."

DeVincent went on to directing professionally, acting (touring for three years with fellow FNI alum, Dereck Walton, and appeared in television commercials and voice-overs), casting, theatre critic/contributing editor (Pittsburgh City Paper), agenting, and teaching theatre in the South on the university level.

Chris Potocki, the second host of Friday Nite Improvs, ran the show from 1993 to 1994. Under Potocki's leadership, Friday Nite Improvs was without a permanent home, so each Friday, the "secret location" of that night's show was spread by word-of-mouth. Potocki hosted FNI in the Cathedral of Learning's studio theatre, The Pit Theatre, the Stephen Foster Memorial, an outdoor amphitheater, and the basement of a Victorian home. Potocki created much of the format that the show used for more than a decade later. One week, Potocki and his sidekick Fletcher Kohlhousen displayed a six-foot wooden clown that they had found in a Shadyside dumpster where, only a week before, the police recovered a severed human head. They named the clown "Winky" and made him the show's mascot.

In August, 2014, Friday Nite Improvs announced via its Facebook page that it was ending its current format as a weekly show on Pitt's campus. Improv comedy performances on the University of Pittsburgh's campus are now held by Ruckus, a university student club which was founded on January 1, 2013.

=== The Hosts ===
- Jeffrey DeVincent (1990–1993)
- Pattie Miles (Co-host, 1990)
- Chris Potocki (1993–1994)
- Charles "Chick" Leiby (1994 - June 1996)
- Louis Stein (June 1996 - October 1998)
- Ben Mayer (October 1998 – June 2013)
- John Feightner (June 2013 – 2014)

== Frequent performers ==
- Chris Potocki - Creator and producer of television comedy reality series Film Fakers for American Movie Classics and Fountain of Youth for The WB Television Network, the latter executive produced by Ashton Kutcher. (Performer, 1989–1993; Host, 1993–1994)
- David Fielding - Actor on the series Mighty Morphin Power Rangers (Performer, 1989–1994) as "Zordon."
- Eric Appel - Director of Weird: The Al Yankovic Story and writer for MTVs Human Giant, the Andy Milonakis Show, and Crank Yankers (Performer, 2000–2002)
- Sue Galloway - Appears weekly on the NBC sitcom 30 Rock, Performer in The Upright Citizens Brigade in New York City (Performer, 1992–1996)

== Charity work ==
Since 1995, when the show first earned a profit, Friday Nite Improvs has donated to charities. Throughout the 1990s, FNI organized yearly 24-hour "Improv-a-thons", in which improv troupes and variety acts from the United States and Canada performed, raising more than $10,000 for the Pittsburgh Aids Taskforce. In 2002, the show donated $7,500 to the 9/11 Disaster Relief Fund. Other charities Friday Nite Improvs has regularly contributed to include Pittsburgh Action Against Rape and the Rainbow Kitchen food pantry in Homestead, Pennsylvania.

== The Show ==
While the content of the show varies from week to week, the show has developed a format that it regularly follows.

=== The Rules ===
- Failure is OK
- Welcome the Performers / Thank Them for Performing
- No Booing
- Listen — Respect The Performers / Respect Your Scene Partner (Previously called the "John Travolta" or "Don't Act in a Bubble" rule by host Chris Potocki.)
- Keep the Theatre Clean (also called the "Ben is Not Your Mother" rule by host Ben Mayer.)
- Wang Chung - "Everybody Have Fun Tonight."

Other rules have fallen by the wayside but are sometimes reinstated by necessity, including "No Stereotypes" and "Too Soon" (after a tragedy of some sort), both of which are more like guidelines for decent comedy than steadfast rules, which is most likely why they are oft-forgotten. Another rule that was briefly enforced but has since been dropped was "Don't Be a Stage Hog" (meaning that one should not go on stage to perform too many times in one night).

=== The Games ===
As of 2006, FNI maintains a catalog of more than 90 improv games. These range from relatively simple scenes in which attributes are intermittently tweaked to guessing games to elaborate, longer forms.

While the majority of these games are gleaned from such sources as books, the Internet, and other improv groups, the regular performers who work behind the scenes actively invent new games for the show. For a period of time, host Ben Mayer even instituted a rule that the second game of the night always be a new one, and the show generated upwards of 50-60 games during that time; admittedly, not all of them are keepers.

As of 2006, a typical show contains six or seven games, including Freeze.

=== Freeze ===
Freeze is the one mainstay game of Friday Nite Improvs, starting every show at approximately midnight, and lasting until around 12:30 a.m. While Freeze exists elsewhere, FNI has its own version of the game, with its own rules.

The host first appoints a nibber, an audience member charged with running the game. Two volunteers from the audience create a scene with suggestions for a relationship and a situation. When an audience member feels the scene is ending, he or she may call out the word "Freeze!", which causes the onstage action to immediately pause. The nibber then decides what happens next, speaking one of two phrases:

- "Go on in!", at which the new audience member will tag out one of the performers and re-create their physical position, using that position as a starting point for a completely new scene.
- Nib!, a gentle rejection that indicates to the audience that the scene still has somewhere to go and has not yet reached a positive end point. The audience member is invited to try again when the scene nears that point.

At some point toward 12:30, the nibber will call out, "The next is a three-person," meaning that when the current scene ends, the new audience member will not tag a player out but will instead join the two performers onstage for a new scene. Finally, the nibber will inform the audience when the current scene will be the last ("This is the last one!"), eventually bringing the game to an end with the word "Scene!"

=== Showcase ===
Showcase, following Freeze, is a variety performance slot, which often features musical performances, poetry recitations, sketch comedy, magic, juggling, dance, escape artistry, and contests. While showcase is intended as an interlude between improv games, improv groups sometimes supply guest performances.

== See also ==
- Theatre in Pittsburgh
