= Esta Soler =

American activist (born 1947)

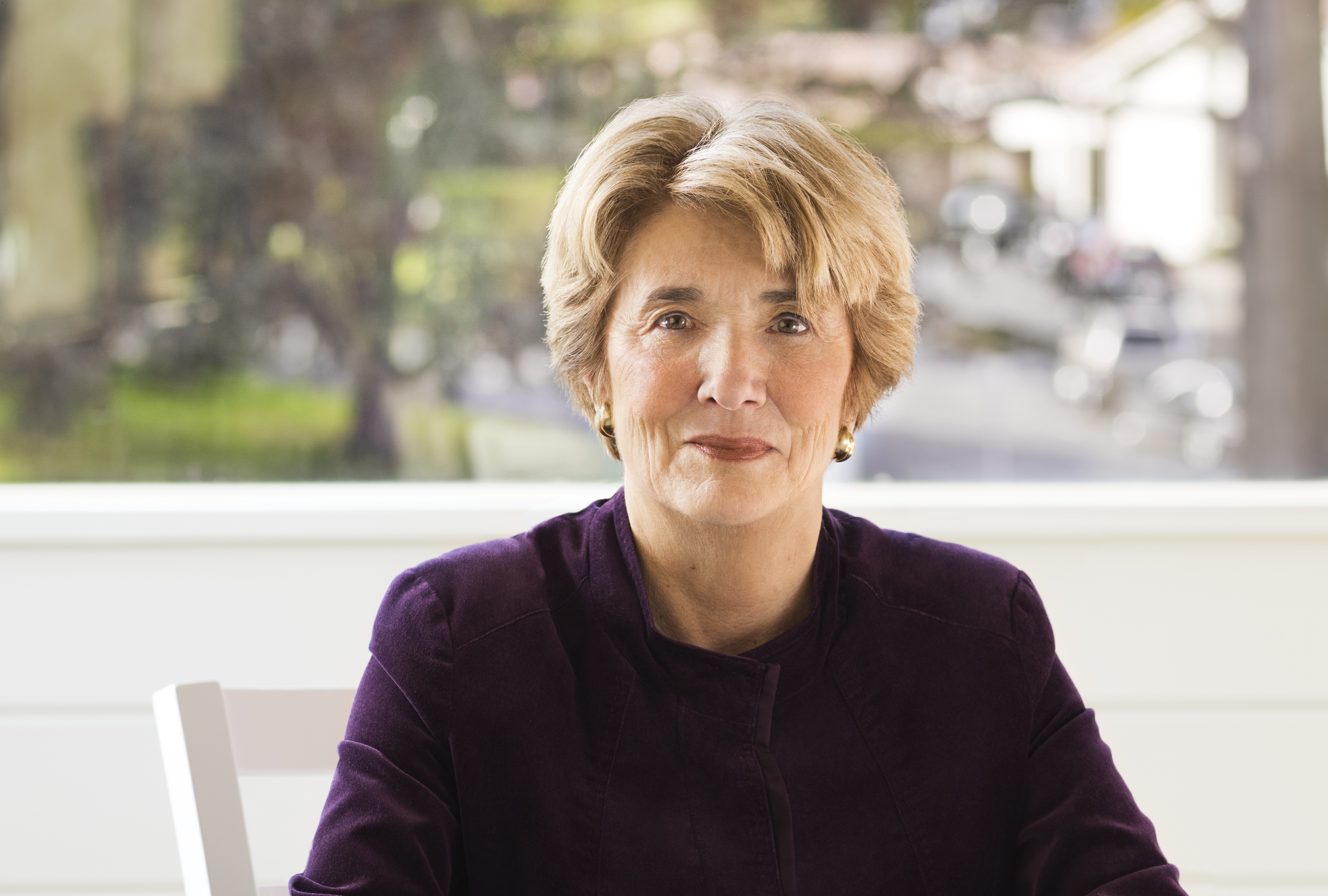
Esta Soler

Esta Soler (born June 26, 1947 in Bridgeport, Connecticut, US) is an American activist who founded the social justice organization Futures Without Violence, and serves as president of FUTURES.

== Early life ==
Soler was born in Bridgeport in 1947. She graduated from Simmons College with a Bachelor of Arts degree in 1968, then obtained her master's degree in Social Work from the University of Connecticut.

== Advocacy ==
Soler became interested in anti-violence advocacy after hearing a speech from Dr. Martin Luther King Jr. in Bridgeport. In 1971, she became a social worker in San Francisco, assisting women in a drug treatment program. Soler learned that many of the women with drug dependencies had also suffered domestic abuse, and that trauma from that abuse was a leading contributor to their addictions. She also learned that law enforcement did not take domestic violence seriously, and frequently did not arrest the abusers. In 1980, Soler established the Family Violence Prevention Fund, later renamed Futures Without Violence, in San Francisco to develop responses to domestic violence nationwide. Under Soler's leadership, the organization was instrumental in passage of the Violence Against Women Act in 1994, as well as its re-authorizations and expansions in 2000, 2005, 2013, and 2022, and the Family Violence Prevention Services Act. Soler is an outspoken advocate for the passage of the International Violence Against Women Act.

Under Soler’s leadership, Futures Without Violence has launched four national public education campaigns in conjunction with The Advertising Council:

- There’s No Excuse for Domestic Violence, which included TV spots as well as radio, print and other collateral, launched in 1994.
- Coaching Boys Into Men, the only evidence-based prevention program that trains and motivates high school coaches to teach their young male athletes healthy relationship skills and that violence never equals strength. The Centers for Disease Control and Prevention recommends the program.
- Created in partnership with the U.S. Department of Justice’s Office on Violence Against Women and the Advertising Council, That’s Not Cool partners with young people to help raise awareness and bring education and organizing tools to communities to address dating violence, unhealthy relationships, and digital abuse. That’s Not Cool won a Webby Award in 2016.
- Changing Minds NOW works with supportive, caring, and consistent adults in the lives of kids, offering tools and strategies to increase awareness and build capacity to help children and youth – particularly those exposed to violence – not only survive, but thrive. It was created through a grant from the Office of Juvenile Justice & Delinquency Prevention, Office of Justice Programs, U.S. Dept. of Justice.

Soler has served a consultant and/or advisor for the Centers for Disease Control & Prevention, the Aspen Institute, and the Soros Justice Fellowship Program. Soler's work to prevent violence against women was featured on MAKERS, an interactive video and documentary project launched by AOL and PBS. Soler delivered a TEDTalk charting 30 years of tactics and technologies—from the Polaroid camera to social media—that have shaped the movement to end domestic violence. She is co-author of Ending Domestic Violence: Changing Public Perception/Halting the Epidemic and has been published and interviewed extensively as an expert on domestic violence.

== Recognition ==
- Koret Israel Prize in 1995
- Kellogg Foundation National Leadership Fellowship 1998
- University of California Public Health Heroes Award in 1998
- Honors from the Center for the Advancement of Women
- Leadership Award from the Coro Center for Civic Leadership
- Mathew O. Tobriner Public Service Award from the Employment Law Center in San Francisco
- Honorary doctorate from Simmons College
- UCSF Medal in 2016.

== Public service ==
Soler serves on the boards of the Blue Shield of California Foundation and the Center for Family Policy and Practice. Soler was a member of the Violence Against Women National Advisory Council under Health & Human Services Secretary Donna Shalala and Attorney General Janet Reno.
