= Women Thrive Worldwide =

Global feminist advocacy network

Women Thrive Alliance, formerly Women Thrive Worldwide and Women's Edge, is a global feminist advocacy network created in 1998 that advocates for gender equality. Working with the grassroots organizations in 53 countries.

Emily Bove is the Executive Director of Women Thrive Alliance.

Women Thrive Alliance's total support and revenue for 2017 were US$871,955.00.

In 2005, Amnesty International USA and Women Thrive Worldwide organized meetings with members of the United States Senate to work toward legislation to combat violence against women and girls around the world. These meetings led to the 2007 International Violence Against Women Act, which was introduced by Senators Joseph Biden and Richard Lugar.

Women Thrive Worldwide has lobbied and helped pass such legislation as the Access for Afghan Women Act, the Afghanistan Freedom Support Act, the GAINS for Women and Girls Act, the Trade Impact Review and the GROWTH Act.

Ritu Sharma Fox is co-founder and the president. USAID calls her "a leading voice on international women's issues and U.S. foreign policy."

According to USAID, "due in large part" to Women Thrive Worldwide, "the interests of poor women worldwide are now being incorporated into U.S. economic assistance and trade policies and, in some cases, into U.S. law itself.

Advocates in the United States Congress for Women Thrive Worldwide Carolyn Maloney, Patty Murray, Richard Durbin, Mary Landrieu, Barbara Mikulski, and Nita Lowey.
