= Rape crisis movement =

Social movement

The Rape Crisis Movement began during Second-wave feminism

== History ==
Before the 1970s rape was used to control and undermine women. During the time of slavery, African American enslaved women were legally allowed to be raped by white men. Even after slavery ended, sexual violence was a tactic used to keep the African American population from gaining civil rights or political power.

Once the Civil War ended and slaves were freed with the right to vote and own land society began to be particularly violent. Mobs burned churches, raped Black women, and much more. Following this in 1866, the Ku Klux Klan raped, lynched, and oppressed the Black communities.

During the Memphis Riot of 1866, a group of African American women testified in front of Congress, ultimately breaking the silence regarding rape.

=== Rape Crisis Movement ===
In the early 1970s, during the second decade of second-wave feminism, the Rape Crisis Movement was conceptualized and promoted by women focused on the experiences of rape victims. Leftist activists and members of counter-culture were among the first to join the movement. Early goals of the movement included disrupting and changing social norms that promoted the oppression of women and violence against them and the creation of a support network that engendered fear and blame free environments where women were safe to join a process of self and mutual aid.

In 1974 the US Government granted funding to Pittsburg Action Against Rape. this was the first time the Federal Government provided financial aid to a rape center. By the late 1970s the United States had over 1,000 rape crises centers in operation. During the same period of time the ideology of the movement shifted. Prior to 1974 most member movements self identified as radical feminist. By the end of the 1970s most members and crisis support staff self identified as liberal reformists. The movement began to become increasingly professionalized in the early 1980s, focusing on organizational structure, staffing, funding and legislation.

== Legislation ==
Changes: Many states reformed their laws to redefine the consequences of rape convictions. The new penalty would be a gradation of offenses compared to when it used to be a single offense. More importantly, certain laws or requirements were repealed which allowed for women to have more authority in their trials. The first element to be repealed was the requirement that the victim's testimony had to be corroborated by a witness. It was also repealed that the victim had to have physically resisted the attacker. This aspect particularly protected women with disabilities since they may not have the complete ability to ward off an assailant.

Rape shield laws: The enactment of rape shield laws also helped to provide further protection for rape victims during trial. These laws were created to restrict the past sexual history of the victim from being used against them during the trial. Formerly, some defendants’ cases revolved around discrediting the victim's claims by claiming that she was promiscuous so it was likely to be consensual.

== See also ==
- Anti-rape movement
- Rape crisis centre
- Rape crisis centers in the United States
- Sexual harassment
- International Violence Against Women Act
