= Pittsburgh Action Against Rape =

Organization helping victims of violence

Pittsburgh Action Against Rape (PAAR) is the only organization in Allegheny County solely devoted to the issues of sexual violence. It was founded in 1972 as a volunteer organisation by Anne Pride, and was the first rape crisis center in Pennsylvania. In 1977 it became one of the first rape crisis centers in the United States to receive federal funding.

PAAR offers training, education, and counseling in responding to trauma to community groups, individuals, professionals and agencies throughout Allegheny County. PAAR provides free, confidential, one-on-one counseling to hundreds of survivors of sexual assault and abuse each year, and to their friends and relatives. PAAR’s counselors provide on-site supportive counseling and crisis counseling.

== See also ==
- Anti-rape movement
