= ValorUS =

American nonprofit sexual assault prevention association

- Founded: May 10, 1980
- Tax ID no.: 94-2800985
- Purpose: Provide leadership, vision and resources to rape crisis centers, individuals and other entities committed to ending sexual violence
- Location: Sacramento, California, United States
- Region served: United States
- CEO: Sandra Henriquez
- Website: www.valor.us
- Formerly called: California State Coalition of Rape Crisis Centers; California Coalition Against Sexual Assault (CALCASA)

ValorUS, formerly the California Coalition Against Sexual Assault (CALCASA), is a nonprofit membership association of rape crisis centers and sexual assault prevention programs in the State of California, in the United States. CALCASA is the only statewide organization in California whose sole purpose is to promote public policy, advocacy, training and technical assistance on the issue of sexual assault. CALCASA’s primary members are the rape crisis centers and rape prevention programs in the state. CALCASA also has affiliate members which include organizations, businesses, individuals and others committed to their mission and their vision of the elimination of sexual violence. Its programs, projects and campaigns include the National Sexual Assault Conference, PreventConnect, Raliance and Bold Moves.

Originally founded in 1980 as the California State Coalition of Rape Crisis Centers, the California Coalition Against Sexual Assault (CALCASA) was created by rape crisis centers from across the state interested in creating a unified voice to advocate on behalf of the statewide needs of survivors, system’s change, funding needs and policy advocacy.

CALCASA works closely with rape crisis centers, government agencies, campuses, institutions, lawmakers, the criminal justice system, medical personnel, community-based organizations and business leaders providing a central resource for improving society's response to sexual violence by supplying knowledge and expertise on a wide range of issues. It is also frequently the recipient of federal grants to conduct nationwide programs, including technical assistance for the Grants to Reduce Domestic Violence, Dating Violence, Sexual Assault, and Stalking on Campus Program of the U.S. Department of Justice's Office on Violence Against Women, and Prevention Connection: The Violence Against Women Partnership funded by the U.S. Centers for Disease Control and Prevention's National Center for Injury Control and Prevention.

== National Sexual Assault Conference ==
The National Sexual Assault Conference (NSAC) is a two and a half day, advocacy-based conference providing advanced training opportunities and information regarding sexual violence intervention and prevention. NSAC is an annual event which is organized on a rotating basis between the Pennsylvania Coalition Against Rape and CALCASA. The conference has rotating themes with the 2019 NSAC theme being Beyond the Breakthrough, which sought to inspire the collective movement to end sexual violence and build on the momentum of the MeToo movement.

== PreventConnect ==
PreventConnect is a national project of the California Coalition Against Sexual Assault with funding from the U.S. Centers for Disease Control and Prevention (CDC), National Center for Injury Prevention and Control. The goal of PreventConnect is to advance the primary prevention of sexual assault and relationship violence by building a community of practice among people who are engaged in such efforts. PreventConnect also builds the capacity of local, state, territorial, national and tribal agencies and organizations to develop, implement and evaluate effective prevention initiatives.

== Raliance ==
Raliance is a national collaborative committed to ending sexual violence in one generation. It comprises the National Alliance to End Sexual Violence (NAESV), the National Sexual Violence Resource Center (NSVRC) and CALCASA. Raliance was founded in 2015 through a multimillion dollar seed investment by the National Football League. In addition to the NFL, Raliance has formed partnerships with other organizations including Uber.

== Bold Moves ==
Bold Moves is a campaign by CALCASA launched in 2020 focused on preventing sexual violence in all forms. The campaign was funded by the Services*Training*Officers*Prosecutors (STOP) Violence Against Women Formula Grant Program funds (TE18211578) through the California Governor's Office of Emergency Services (Cal OES).

== See also ==
- Rape in the United States
