= CBIM =

CBIM may refer to

- Companion of the British Institute of Management, in 2002 renamed as the Chartered Management Institute
- Center for Computational Biomedicine Imaging and Modeling at Rutgers University
- Computer-Based Interactive Multimedia
- Coaching Boys into Men, a programme of Futures Without Violence
