= Janet C. Anderson Gender Resource Center =

- Established: 1998
- Location: Pocatello, Idaho, United States
- Type: Women's Health, Men's health
- Director: Interim Director Åsa Burlin

The Janet C. Anderson Gender Resource Center is located on the Idaho State University campus. The Center addresses topics that deal with equality issues that have an effect on the community regardless of sexual dimorphism, gender, or sexual orientation.

== Mission statement ==
The mission statement for the Janet C. Anderson Gender Resource Center is:

The Janet C. Anderson Gender Resource Center at Idaho State University serves as the focal point on campus for the consideration of gender issues. The mission of the Center is to increase awareness and promote open dialogue about gender through its resources and services, educational programming and support of gender-related research. In our efforts, we are especially guided by the ideal of diversity, which allows us to envision a future free of the limitations imposed by our culture's standard definitions of gender. Funded through mandatory student fees, the Center’s primary target audience is that of ISU students; the Center also welcomes the interest and participation of prospective students, ISU faculty and staff, and members of the Eastern Idaho community.

== History ==
The founding of the Janet C. Anderson Gender Resource Center originated in 1996 when members of Idaho State University Professional Women asked President Richard Bowen about establishing a women's center. As a result, Bowen appointed Dr. Janet Anderson, Dean of Student Affairs, to head a committee that would determine if a women's center was a feasible idea for Idaho State University. It was decided that a gender center was an ideal venue for Idaho State University to address women's issues on campus, however the Center was not funded at that time.

In 1998, when Anderson was preparing for her retirement, the Associated Students of ISU (ASISU) was searching for a plan to honor Anderson's service towards the university. As a result, ASISU decided that a center funded through student fees would be an ideal solution to honor Anderson. In October 1998, the Janet C. Anderson Resource Center opened in its permanent space in Gravely Hall.

In December 1999, the Center established the Project Hope Advocacy Program through a grant from the Department of Justice's Office on Violence Against Women. Following a grant renewal, the State Board of Education approved funding for a permanent, full-time advocacy position in 2004. In the spring of 2003, the Idaho Department of Health and Welfare provided a grant to establish the W.I.S.E. Project, an HIV prevention program for women. Also in the spring of 2003, the Center received funding from the Idaho Department of health and Welfare's Rape Prevention and Education Fund, which supports the Center's Project Hope graduate assistant planning programming specifically for men.

The Janet C. Anderson Gender Resource Center has undergone many changes since its founding. On December 9, 2002, President Bowen accepted a proposal by Rebecca Morrow, to amend the Center's official name to the Janet C. Anderson Gender Resource Center. The word "gender" was included to more accurately describe the mission of the Center. The Center believes there should be an open and fair dialogue between both males and females to construct gender. At the Center, hard work has been implemented to make it known as a place that is open to anyone who shares in the curiosity about women's and men's lives in our society.

== Services ==
The Janet C. Anderson Gender Resource Center provides a number of services that are all geared towards constructing a better understanding of "gender" and how both men and women can affect the word "gender". The Center provides educational programming, the support of gender-related research, and resources that help individuals make important life decisions.

=== Educational programming ===
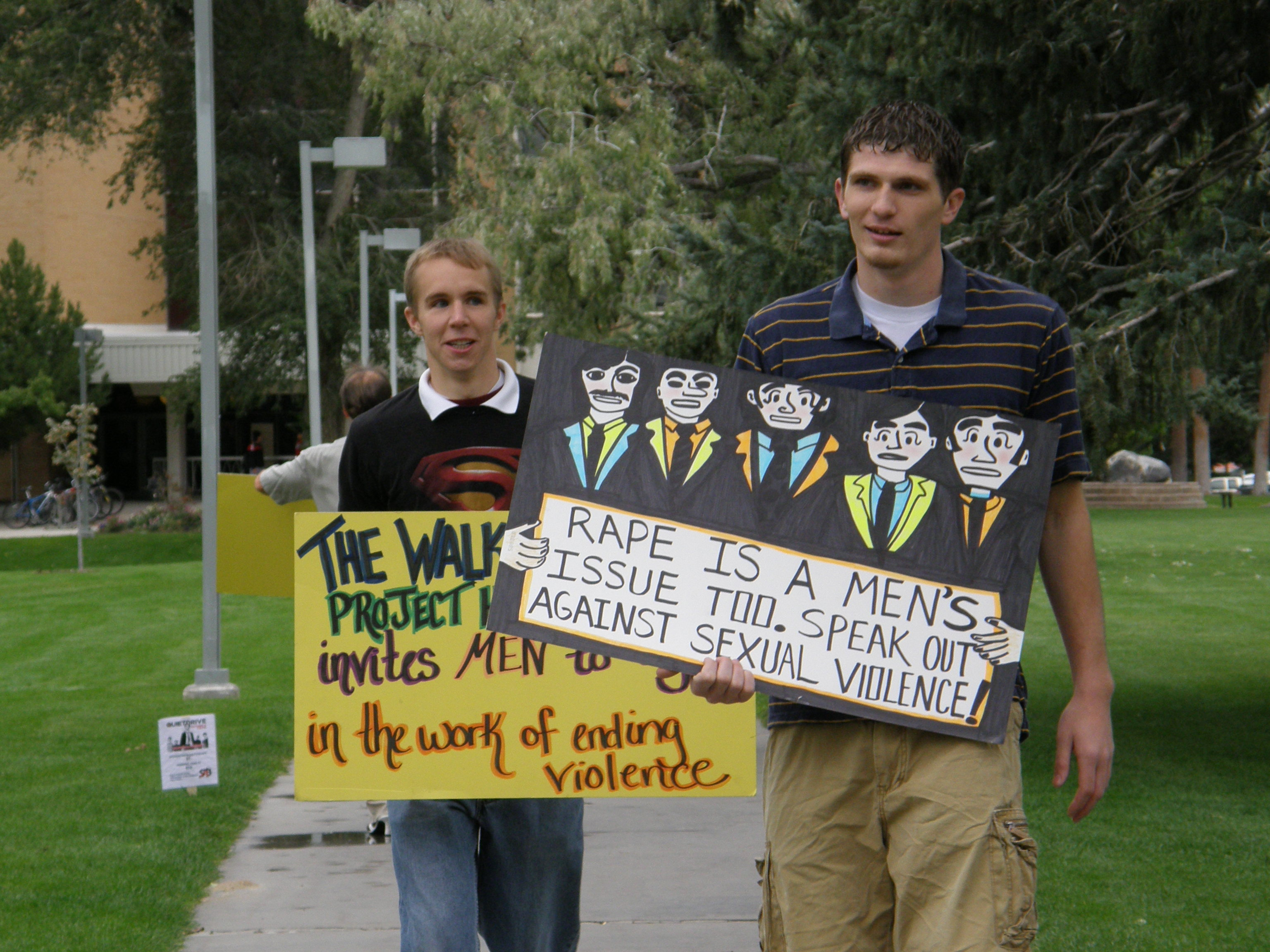
Photo from "Walk a Mile in Her Shoes", an event hosted to prevent sexual assault by males

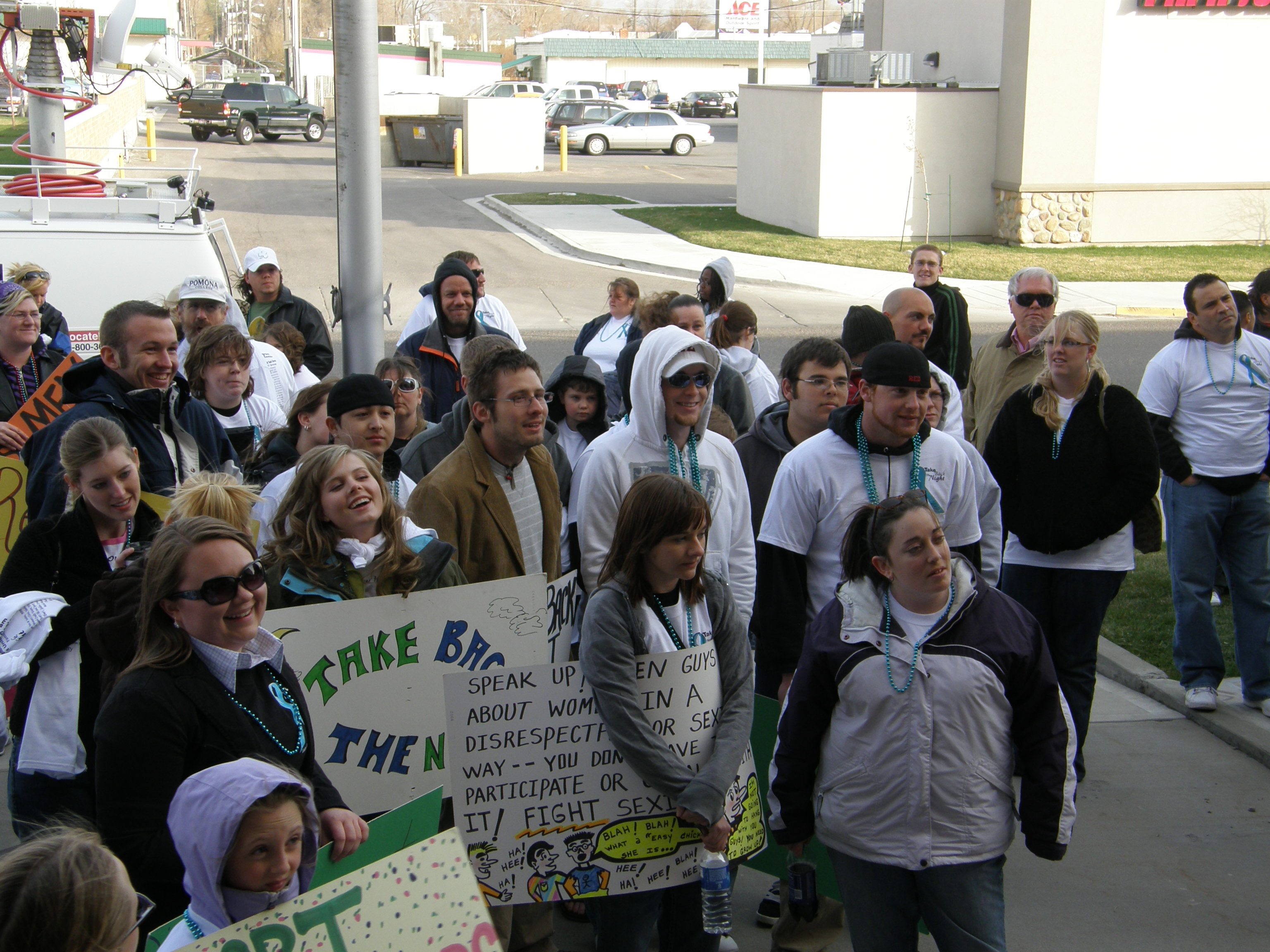
Photo from "Take Back the Night", an event held at the Bannock County Courthouse

Each year, the Center takes part in commemorating and celebrating nationally designated months and participates in events designed to draw attention to particular gender-related issues, including:

- Heart health and Dating Violence Month (February)
- Women's History Month (March)
- Sexual Assault Awareness Month (April)
- Domestic Violence Awareness Month and Breast Cancer Awareness Month (October)
- Positive Body Image Day (late February)
- National Coming Out Day (October 11)
- World AIDS Day (December 1)

The Center also hosts discussion groups and sponsors entertainment-oriented events. The Center attempts to maintain a healthy relationship with faculty and staff by giving them the opportunity to host presentations and group discussions surrounding topics such as domestic violence, sexual assault, stalking, healthy relationships, and HIV/AIDS including prevention and cultural diversity.

=== Support of gender-related research ===
The Janet C. Anderson Gender Resource Center sponsors lectures by nationally known figures on an irregular basis.

=== Resources ===
The Janet C. Anderson Gender Resource Center's library holds books, magazines, and pamphlets on a variety of gender-related topics. The library holds material that focuses on everyone no matter what their sex, sexual orientation, ethnic or cultural background, religion, abilities or age are. Materials from the library can be borrowed for a period up to a month.
