= Anne Pride =

American feminist

- Obituary photo in The Pittsburgh Press April 26, 1990
- Born: Anne Huggett; July 29, 1942; Pittsburgh, Pennsylvania, US
- Died: April 24, 1990 (aged 47); West Penn Hospital, Pittsburgh, PA, US
- Other name: Anne Kurlfink
- Occupations: Housewife, activist, editor, publisher
- Known for: Prompting landmark legislation regarding the confidentiality of rape victims' records
- Criminal charge: Contempt of court, 1980. Appeal upheld
- Spouse: Edwin Kurlfink
- Children: 2

Anne Pride (July 29, 1942 – April 24, 1990) was a National Organization for Women (NOW) activist and publisher. Pride, an activist against rape, began using the term "Take Back the Night" in 1977. Pride helped found one of the first rape crisis centers in the United States and was involved in protecting the privacy of her clients.

== Career ==
Pride started getting involved in feminist activism in 1968. She joined the National Organization of Women (NOW) in 1969. She served as editor of Do It NOW, NOW's national newsletter from 1970 to 1976. From 1975 to 1977, she was on the board of directors for NOW.

As a NOW activist, in 1977 she used the term "Take Back the Night" in a memorial she read at an anti-violence rally in Pittsburgh.

Pride was a founder of KNOW, Inc., which worked to publish feminist viewpoints. In 1977, Pride became an associate of the Women's Institute for Freedom of the Press (WIFP).

Pride helped create one of the world's first rape crisis centers, (Note: The Sydney Rape Crisis Centre was established in 1971.) the Pittsburgh Action Against Rape (PAAR) in 1974. She later became part of PAAR staff, starting in 1976.

In the 1980s, she was the director of PAAR. In 1980, Pride refused to give client interview notes to the defense attorney during a rape trial, citing confidentiality concerns. She was found in contempt of court and the appeal was upheld by the Pennsylvania Supreme Court. The court case led to the creation of legislation in Pennsylvania which would ensure confidentiality for rape victims and counselors at crisis centers.

== Personal life ==
Pride was born as Anne Hugget on July 29, 1942. She married Edwin Kurlfink at the age of 16, but even before her separation and divorce, wanted to change her name back to Huggett, her family name. However, Pride's father didn't want his name to be associated with the women's movement. Upon her separation from Edwin in 1977, she changed her name to Pride. She and her husband had two children.

Pride was diagnosed with ovarian cancer in 1989. She died on April 24, 1990, at West Penn Hospital after fighting cancer.
