= National Sexual Violence Resource Center =

US non-profit agency

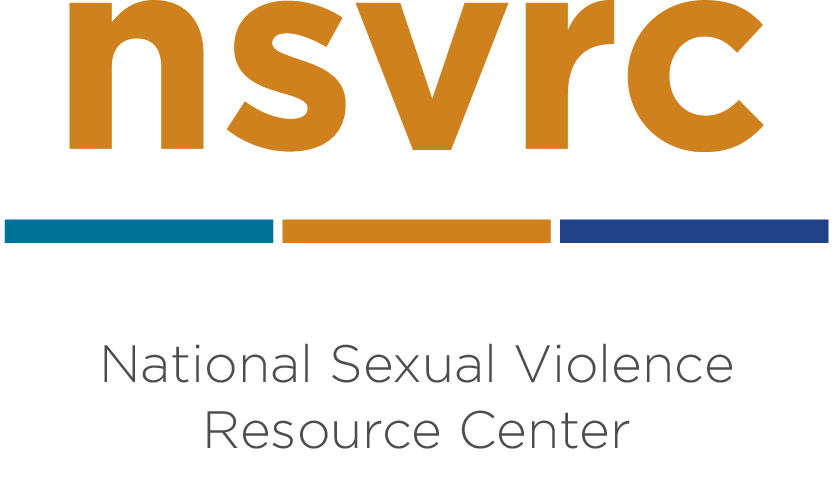
- The rebranded logo of NSVRC
- Abbreviation: NSVRC
- Formation: July 2000; 26 years ago
- Purpose: Resources for sexual violence prevention and response
- Headquarters: Harrisburg, Pennsylvania
- Region served: United States
- CEO: Yolanda Edrington
- Website: www.nsvrc.org

The National Sexual Violence Resource Center (NSVRC) is an American nonprofit organization that addresses the causes and impact of sexual violence through collaboration, prevention, and resources. Working in collaboration with state and territory sexual assault coalitions, representatives from underserved populations, the Centers for Disease Control and Prevention, the U.S. Department of Justice's Office on Violence Against Women, and a host of community-based and national allied projects, NSVRC provides national leadership to address and prevent sexual violence.

Activities include providing training and technical assistance, giving referrals, consulting, participating in systems advocacy, creating online tools, curating a resource library, building capacity, integrating research findings with community-based projects, coordinating Sexual Assault Awareness Month, and sponsoring national conferences and events. NSVRC was founded by the Pennsylvania Coalition Against Rape in 2000.

Although based in the United States, the NSVRC offers technical assistance and resources that assist communities and programs on a global scale.

== Resources ==
As a national information center, NSVRC collects and disseminates a wide range of resources on sexual violence including statistics, research, position statements, statutes, training curricula, prevention initiatives, and program information. Additionally, NSVRC develops print and online resources on a range of sexual violence-related topics including child sexual abuse, housing, workplace sexual violence, sexual violence in disasters, engaging bystanders in prevention, and building collaborative community responses.

=== Library ===
NSVRC houses a largest resource collection devoted to the topic of sexual violence and its prevention, with more than 44,000 unique titles. Although the NSVRC library does not out loan books or audiovisual materials, many resources are available upon request through interlibrary loan. The library shares scholarly journal articles, reports, and other resources with the public upon request. Through the online catalog, the collection is available worldwide to advocates, researchers, practitioners, and the general public.

=== Online learning campus ===
NSVRC’s online learning campus provides free access to eLearning modules that educate about sexual violence prevention and response.

== History ==
NSVRC opened in July 2000 as a national information and resource hub relating to all aspects of sexual violence. Founded by the Pennsylvania Coalition Against Rape (the oldest anti-rape coalition in the country, founded in 1975) NSVRC is funded through a cooperative agreement from the Centers for Disease Control and Prevention’s Division of Violence Prevention.

== Structure ==
NSVRC staff are guided and assisted by a national Advisory Council committed to ending sexual violence. Council members serve a three-year term during which time they participate in quarterly conference calls, annual meetings, committee work, and provide consultation on a variety of topics as needed.

== Fundraising ==
NSVRC offers two donation streams: one that directly supports their work, and another that supports sexual assault victims impacted by disasters. Donations to NSVRC support their work to create resources on sexual violence prevention, help facilitate technical assistance requests from coalitions, advocates, and others interested in understanding and eliminating sexual violence, and support efforts to prevent child sexual abuse.

The Relief Fund for Sexual Assault Victims aids sexual assault victim and advocacy programs impacted by disasters. All donations go directly to victims and programs.

== Affiliates ==
=== Pennsylvania Coalition to Advance Respect ===
The Pennsylvania Coalition to Advance Respect (PCAR) is the oldest anti-rape coalition in the United States, working to eliminate all forms of sexual violence and advocating for the rights and needs of victims. Founded in 1975, PCAR works with a statewide network of 51 rape crisis centers serving all 67 counties to provide services to survivors of sexual violence.

=== RALIANCE ===
RALIANCE is a national partnership dedicated to ending sexual violence in one generation. It comprises NSVRC, the California Coalition Against Sexual Assault, and the National Alliance to End Sexual Violence.

== Notable campaigns and programs ==
=== Sexual Assault Awareness Month ===
In the United States, April is typically designated as Sexual Assault Awareness Month (SAAM). The goal of SAAM is to raise public awareness about sexual violence and educate communities on how to prevent it. Since 2001, NSVRC has coordinated the national campaign theme and developed resources for organizations and individuals who wish to commemorate SAAM in their communities.

=== National Sexual Assault Conference ===
The National Sexual Assault Conference (NSAC) is a two-and-a-half-day, advocacy-based conference providing advanced training opportunities and information regarding sexual violence intervention and prevention. NSAC is an annual event that is organized on a rotating basis between NSVRC, the Pennsylvania Coalition to Advance Respect, and the California Coalition Against Sexual Assault.

=== National award programs ===
NSVRC supports two award programs:

- The Visionary Voice Awards are given each April to individuals who have demonstrated outstanding work to end sexual violence.
- The Gail Burns-Smith Award recognizes people who have made significant contributions to preventing sexual violence through their work to facilitate effective partnerships between advocates working on behalf of victims and survivors and those working in the area of sex offender management and treatment.

== Controversies ==
In February 2025, journalist Mady Castigan noted that NSVRC had recently removed references to trans people from their website. Castigan speculated that the change was related to the second Trump administration's restrictions on funding trans-supportive organizations.
