= Red Brigade Trust =

Indian non-governmental organization

- Founded: 2011
- Founders: Ajay Patel, Usha Vishwakarma, Jyoti, etc.
- Type: Non-governmental organization
- Purpose: Women's Rights, Safety and Empowerment
- Location: Lucknow, Uttar Pradesh, India
- Region served: India
- Method: Awareness Campaigns, Protests, Nukkad Natak, Self Defense Training, Nishastra
- Chief Managing Trustee: Ajay Patel
- Website: http://redbrigadetrust.com/

The Red Brigade Trust is a non-governmental organization headquartered in Lucknow, Uttar Pradesh, India. It was founded in 2011 by Ajay Patel and team to empower women through self-defense education.

== About ==
In 2011, Ajay Patel and 15 young girls, all of whom are sexual assault survivors, formed the Red Brigade Trust. Ajay was inspired to form the group after an 11-year-old student confided in her about an assault she experienced by a family member. The Red Brigade registered as a Trust under the Indian Trust Act of 1882 in MARCH 2014.

== Self defense techniques ==
The group initially started by teaching girls traditional martial arts, however they soon realized that martial arts is ineffective in many sexual assault cases. The self defense movement gained popularity during second-wave feminism but can be traced back to as early as the 1910s. Self defense is a means of both psychological and physical resistance. It can promote a woman's physical abilities and independence, and reduce their vulnerability to sexual harassment and assault. Women's self defense training challenges gendered ideas of feminine weakness and fragility.

In the past couple years, self-defense classes have gained popularity all over India. Young girls in grades 6 through 7 at government-run schools are taught 3 months worth of self defense training. They are taught to use everyday items as weapons to gain advantages in assaults. The department of school education and literacy in India have implemented self-defense training to ensure the safety of students and reduce dropout rates. Moreover, New Delhi police have been teaching a 10-day course in public schools and universities since 2010. They teach a combination of karate, taekwondo, and judo. These classes, led by female officers, are taught year round.

== Statistics of Lucknow ==
Of all metropolitan cities in India, Lucknow has the second highest number of registered dowry deaths. Currently, dowry death is defined as “Where the death of a woman is caused by any burns or bodily injury or occurs otherwise than under normal circumstances within seven years of her marriage and it is shown that soon before her death she was subjected to cruelty or harassment by her husband or any relative of her husband for, or in connection with, any demand for dowry, such death shall be called "dowry death", and such husband or relative shall be deemed to have caused her death.”

Lucknow also has the highest number of harassment cases of women on public transport.

== Cultural stigma of sexual violence in India ==
Women in India are less likely to report incidences of sexual violence and assault due to greater acceptance of rape myths, which are a set of beliefs suggesting that victims are at fault. Indian culture has more traditional attitudes towards women and as a result, there are higher levels of hostile sexism. The late 1970s marked the start of a women's movement in India as women from all classes united behind anti-rape activism. Despite the progress of feminist ideas, traditional gender roles and patriarchal beliefs dominate.

In 2012, the rape case of 23 year old girl sparked national and international attention to India's laws against sexual assault. The number of demonstrations following this case was unseen in India before. Protesters urged for stricter laws and punishments against perpetrators. This case was a turning point for India and many people have spoken out since. In spite of the increased scrutiny on the government, sexual violence against women have continued in the same trajectory. In 2021, more than 31 thousand cases of rape were registered. From 2020 to 2021, there was a 13.2% increase in overall crimes against women. In many of these cases, prosecution of offenders were rare. Considering that many cases go unreported, statistics only tell one part of the story.
