= Pennsylvania Coalition to Advance Respect =

US nonprofit organization

- Pennsylvania Coalition to Advance Respect
- Abbreviation: PCAR
- Predecessor: Pennsylvania Coalition Against Rape
- Formation: 1975; 51 years ago
- Headquarters: Harrisburg, Pennsylvania
- Location: United States
- Region served: Statewide network of 47 rape crisis centers serving all 67 counties in Pennsylvania
- Services: Public policy advocacy and service support for survivors of sexual violence
- Coalition Director: Joyce Lukima
- Respect Together CEO: Yolanda Edrington
- Parent organization: Respect Together
- Affiliations: National Sexual Violence Resource Center Respect Together
- Website: pcar.org

The Pennsylvania Coalition to Advance Respect (PCAR) is the oldest statewide anti-sexual violence coalition in the United States. Based in Harrisburg, Pennsylvania, PCAR was founded in 1975 as the Pennsylvania Coalition Against Rape and adopted its new name in 2023.

Since its formation, PCAR has been a national leader in the movement to eliminate all forms of sexual violence and continues to advocate for the rights and needs of survivors of sexual abuse, assault, and harassment.

PCAR works with a network of 47 rape crisis centers serving all 67 counties of Pennsylvania. The coalition distributes state funding to rape crisis centers and provides them with public policy advocacy, professional training, technical assistance, sexual violence prevention resources, and support for programs serving Pennsylvania victims of sexual abuse, assault, and harassment.

PCAR also established the National Sexual Violence Resource Center (NSVRC) in 2000. The center now operates as its own nonprofit organization, also under the parent organization Respect Together.

== History ==
Founded in 1975, PCAR works with a statewide network of 51 rape crisis centers serving all 67 counties across the Commonwealth of Pennsylvania to provide services to survivors of sexual violence.

As part of this organization's mission, PCAR personnel research and advocate for public policies to protect and provide recovery assistance to victims of sexual violence and to hold sexual violence offenders accountable in order to improve the safety of communities. During the fall of 1975, PCAR and its supporters lobbied members of the Pennsylvania State Legislature to change procedures statewide for defining, managing and prosecuting rape cases. Among the changes that were demanded:

- Authorizing police and prosecutors to charge and prosecute husbands for raping their wives "provided they [were] living in separate residences or provided either spouse [had] filed a divorce complaint";
- Elimination of the requirement of proof of resistance by victims in order for rape cases to be prosecuted;
- Lengthening the amount of time that rape survivors had to file charges against offenders to ninety days after the dates of attack;
- Prohibiting the introduction of testimony regarding a rape victim's "past sexual conduct with anybody other than the accused rapist"; and
- Prohibiting judges from instructing juries that any victim's credibility was questionable due to "her emotional involvement in the event."

On March 16, 1976, PCAR joined with women's groups statewide to hold a lobby day at the Pennsylvania State Capitol when legislation prohibiting the introduction of victims' sexual histories into court cases was delayed by legislators attempting to weaken proposed changes by continuing to allow the introduction of sexual history information in statutory rape cases that involved victims who were aged sixteen or younger.

In November 1978, PCAR executive director Sandra Lambert praised U.S. President Jimmy Carter for signing the Rape Victim Act into law on October 30 of that year. The federal law, which followed Pennsylvania's groundbreaking passage of Act 53 in 1976 to improve legal protections for rape survivors, was designed to reduce the introduction of testimony in future rape trials across the United States regarding survivors' past sexual histories by requiring that any such proposed testimony would be submitted to presiding judges in private hearings to determine whether or not it was directly related to the defense of alleged offenders and appropriate for trial use. According to Lambert, "In the 27 rape crisis centers in Pennsylvania, we have seen not only an increase in reporting of rape since Act 53 was passed, but also more offenders going to court." Lambert noted that the recidivism rate of rape offenders was estimated at seventy-three percent.

From May through October of 1979, according to PCAR, 1,322 victims of rape sought assistance from nineteen of the thirty-five rape crisis centers operating across the state. Of those 1,322 survivors, 557 (42.1 percent) were children under the age of eighteen.

In August 1979, Anne Pride, the administrator of Pittsburgh Action Against Rape, was elected as PCAR's president. In December of that same year, the Pennsylvania House's Judiciary Committee voted 14-3 in favor of legislation that would strip husbands of the "right to use marriage as a defense against sexual assault charges." The bill had increased its co-sponsorship from five legislators during 1978 to twenty-four in 1979. Between June and March of 1978, seventy-seven women had reported being forced by their husbands to have sexual intercourse, against their will, according to PCAR, which noted that this figure was an increase from the fifty-nine cases of marital rape that had been reported in 1977.

On February 5, 1980, PCAR joined with the Pennsylvania Coalition Against Domestic Violence to present a Legislative Education Day at the Pennsylvania State Capitol to increase understanding about House Bills 744 and 745, which proposed the creation of The Office on Crime Victims to improve investigation and prosecution of domestic abuse and sexual assault crimes and fund domestic violence shelters, rape crisis centers and support services for crime victims and witnesses.

== Role in Pennsylvania's rape crisis network ==
PCAR serves as the statewide coalition for Pennsylvania's network of 47 rape crisis centers, which collectively provide services across all 67 counties of the Commonwealth. The coalition supports the network through statewide coordination, professional training of center staff, technical assistance, sexual violence prevention resources, public policy advocacy, and the distribution of state funding. The individual rape crisis centers operate as independent community-based organizations serving designated geographic areas.

Local rape crisis centers, also called sexual assault centers, rather than PCAR, provide most direct services to victims and survivors of sexual violence. These services include 24-hour hotline crisis intervention, therapy, individual and group counseling, professional training, prevention education, legal advocacy, medical advocacy, information and referrals, and support for family members and others affected by sexual abuse, assault and harassment. Advocates may accompany survivors to hospitals, police departments, court proceedings, and other appointments, and assist them in navigating medical, legal, and criminal justice systems. Services are generally provided without charge and are confidential, subject to applicable legal requirements.

Rape crisis centers also provide sexual violence prevention and public education programs in schools, workplaces, and community settings. These programs may address topics including consent, healthy relationships, bystander intervention, sexual harassment, and the prevention of sexual abuse and exploitation.

PCAR works with state agencies and local centers to develop and evaluate statewide prevention strategies. Through Pennsylvania's participation in the federal Rape Prevention and Education Program, PCAR has partnered with the Pennsylvania Department of Health and local organizations to support primary prevention programs across the state.

As the statewide coalition, PCAR provides professional development and technical assistance intended to strengthen services and promote consistent practices across the rape crisis network. Its training and education resources are also used by professionals in health care, education, law enforcement, social service, and the courts.

PCAR represents the rape crisis network in discussions with state agencies, lawmakers, and other institutions concerning sexual violence prevention, victims' rights, service standards, public policy, and funding. The coalition also provides resources to help local centers respond to changes in law, technology, professional practice, and the needs of the communities they serve.

Funding for Pennsylvania's rape crisis network comes form state appropriations, federal victim-service grants, local funding, charitable contributions, and other public and private sources. PCAR administers the Commonwealth's annual rape crisis appropriation and distributes funding among the local centers. Individual centers may also receive funding through federal programs, including grants supported by the Victims of Crime Act, and through grants administered by the Pennsylvania Commission on Crime and Delinquency.

== Programs and services ==
Beginning in the late 1970s, PCAR and its supporters developed and presented professional development and civic education programs that provided training for educators, healthcare workers, journalist, legal and public safety professionals, and members of the general public regarding the forms of sexual violence and their impact on communities across Pennsylvania.

From 2009 to October 1, 2015, PCAR founded and provided financial management services for AEquitas, which supported prosecutors working on human trafficking and gender-based violence cases worldwide.

In 2015, Pennsylvania enacted the Protection of Victims of Sexual Violence or Intimidation Law, which expanded "traditional court-ordered protection from its typical targets [of harassment]—such as ex-spouses or relatives—to acquaintances and strangers," including minors. According to Joyce Lukima, PCAR's chief operating officer, "Survivors of rape on college campuses have gotten protective orders under the law." Lukima added:

This really offers a tool for survivors to keep them safe. People are just becoming aware of this as an option for them. When they see there's some action they can take, they're probably more likely to reach out for help also.

In 2018, PCAR launched its Sexual Violence Legal Assistance Project to provide comprehensive legal services for sexual violence survivors. It also lobbied the state legislature to eliminate civil and criminal statutes of limitation in child sexual abuse cases and to also "expand the window of opportunity for those who have timed out of the criminal and civil limits to seek justice" through civil methods later in life. According to PCAR's chief executive officer, Karen Baker:

We know that delayed reporting of sexual violence is normal, common and should be expected. Many people who have been sexually abused, wait months, years or decades before discussing what was done to them with anyone, let alone making a formal report to authorities.

We must give survivors of child sexual abuse the time they need to report on their own terms—not according to some arbitrary and outdated time limit.

We also know that adults who commit sexual violence tend to commit multiple acts against multiple people. And it is time for Pennsylvania law to reflect this reality and provide law enforcement the ability to investigate whenever a victim is ready to make a report in hopes of stopping the perpetrator from harming others.

=== Present day ===
PCAR personnel currently research, develop and publish resources regarding sexual assault-related issues, and present training programs for professionals across Pennsylvania, such as PCAR's reference cards and training videos for Pennsylvania judges and PCAR's annual state conference, including the 2023 event, "Honoring Resiliency and Humanity." They also work with members of the news media to provide access to accurate information and foster ethical reporting while also increasing awareness by the general public of the impact that sexual violence has on individuals and individual communities.

In addition, PCAR personnel manage the operations of the National Sexual Violence Resource Center (NSVRC), which provides sexual violence prevention and intervention resources. They also collaborate with personnel from the National Alliance to End Sexual Violence (NAESV) and ValorUS in operating RALIANCE, which was established with financial support from the National Football League in 2015 to reduce and ultimately eradicate sexual violence.

At the end of 2023, the Pennsylvania Coalition Against Rape rebranded and combined with the group Respect Together and the National Sexual Violence Resource Center. The new name was the Pennsylvania Coalition to Advance Respect.

On December 18, 2023, the 20-year-long CEO, Karen Baker, retired from the organization. The new CEO is now Yolanda Edrington, the former COO of the National Sexual Violence Resource Center. Edrington is native to Harrisburg, PA.

== State funding ==
Pennsylvania provides annual funding for rape crisis services through a dedicated state budget appropriation administered by the Pennsylvania Department of Human Services. PCAR distributes the appropriation among the Commonwealth's rape crisis centers, which use the funding to support crisis intervention, counseling, advocacy, prevention education, and related services.

State funding represents one part of the broader financial structure supporting the rape crisis network. Centers may also receive federal grants, local government funding, private donations, and other public or charitable support. Funding levels and available resources vary among centers based on factors including service area, organizational structure, staffing needs and access to other revenue sources.

PCAR has historically advocated for state appropriation as part of its public policy role. Its funding advocacy has focused on maintaining the stability of the statewide network, addressing rising operating costs, retaining trained staff, and preserving access to service across Pennsylvania.

=== Early Funding Sources ===
PCAR was formed in 1975 after representatives from ten rape crisis centers participated in CONCERN ’75, a regional gathering that helped create the statewide coalition. The early organization brought locally established, largely community-based rape crisis programs together for coordinated advocacy, training, and statewide policy work.

On December 4, 1980, Pennsylvania enacted a direct appropriation to PCAR through House Bill 2930, sponsored by Representative Richard McClatchy. The legislation passed the House 187–0 and the Senate 48–0 before being approved by the governor.

That appropriation provided $24,000 for PCAR’s operational expenses during the 1980–81 fiscal year. The bill itself appears to be one of the earliest clearly documented appropriations made directly to the coalition.

This $24,000 should not necessarily be described as the original rape crisis services line item. It was specifically designated for PCAR’s operations, and rape crisis centers may already have been receiving public funding through other state, local, federal, or agency-administered programs. Archival records from Philadelphia, for example, refer to a rape-related grant as early as 1976, but the available description does not show that the grant passed through PCAR or represented a statewide appropriation.

By 1987, PCAR described itself in testimony to the Pennsylvania House Appropriations Committee as the Department of Public Welfare’s primary statewide contractor for rape crisis services. At that point, PCAR distributed funding to 39 subcontracting centers serving 51 counties, maintained a statewide hotline, and coordinated service expectations across the network. The proposed state and federal appropriation for rape crisis services that year was approximately $2.09 million.

The funding system received a clearer statutory foundation through Act 44 of 1988, which required the Department of Public Welfare to make grants for the operation of rape crisis and domestic violence programs. The law directed the department to consider factors such as population, geographic coverage, service scope, community need, and other available funding when awarding grants.

A 2013 Department of Public Welfare report explains that the department subsequently provided rape crisis funding to PCAR, which subcontracted with local centers and used a department-approved formula to distribute funds. By fiscal year 2012–13, PCAR received approximately $8.74 million through the department, including about $7.02 million in state funds and $1.72 million in federal funds.

=== 2026 Historic Budget Increase ===
In July 2026, Pennsylvania approved a $12 million increase in annual state funding for rape crisis centers as part of the Commonwealth’s 2026–27 budget. The increase brought the rape crisis services appropriation to $24.17 million, nearly twice the amount provided during the previous fiscal year. The Shapiro administration described it as the largest funding increase for Pennsylvania’s rape crisis centers in state history.

The increase followed several years of financial strain across Pennsylvania’s rape crisis network. The centers had received no increase in state funding during six of the previous ten budget cycles. Although the 2025–26 budget included an additional $250,000, the increase amounted to approximately 2 percent across the statewide network. Center administrators reported that inflation, reductions in federal victim-services funding, workforce shortages, and the effects of the 2025 state budget impasse had contributed to staffing reductions, program cuts, depleted reserves, and increased reliance on credit.

Governor Josh Shapiro’s initial budget proposal for 2026–27 would have maintained funding at the previous year’s level. Following the February 2026 budget address, PCAR and other survivor-service organizations called for a $12.5 million increase to the rape crisis line item. PCAR coordinated advocacy with local rape crisis centers, survivors, community partners, and public officials to document the financial condition of the network and the effects of prolonged flat funding.

Local rape crisis center executives played a prominent role in the campaign. They included Ali Perrotto, chief executive officer of the Sexual Assault Resource and Counseling Center; Stacie Blake, chief executive officer of YWCA Lancaster; Christine Zaccarelli, chief executive officer of the Crime Victims’ Center of Chester County; and LaQuisha Anthony, executive director of WOAR: Philadelphia Center Against Sexual Violence. The four leaders participated in PCAR’s Eastern Regional Advocacy Meeting in Lancaster, where they joined lawmakers, law enforcement officials, victim-service professionals, and other community leaders to discuss the effects of underfunding on survivor services.

Alongside PCAR's Public Policy Director, Perrotto emerged as one of the campaign’s leading public advocates. She met with lawmakers, provided information about the financial pressures facing rape crisis centers, and helped articulate the consequences of prolonged underfunding for staffing and service delivery. Independent reporting following passage of the budget highlighted her role in explaining how stagnant appropriations, inflation, and reductions in other funding sources had affected centers’ ability to maintain programs and retain experienced employees.

The broader campaign included an open letter to state officials, meetings with legislators and administration officials, public events at the Pennsylvania State Capitol, regional advocacy meetings, and the presentation of statewide service and financial data. Center leaders described difficulties retaining trained staff, maintaining counseling and prevention programs, and absorbing rising operating expenses while continuing to provide round-the-clock crisis services.

Center representatives also presented detailed financial and service information to Pennsylvania Department of Human Services Secretary Val Arkoosh and other state officials. According to Spotlight PA, the information demonstrated how inflation and stagnant appropriations had reduced the centers’ ability to pay staff and operating expenses while responding to continued demand for services. Leaders from centers across Pennsylvania continued meeting with lawmakers during the spring budget negotiations.

The final budget included $12 million of the $12.5 million requested by PCAR and its partners. The appropriation supports 47 rape crisis centers serving all 67 Pennsylvania counties. Collectively, the centers provide services to approximately 26,000 victims and survivors each year, including crisis counseling, 24-hour hotline support, medical and legal advocacy, prevention education, emergency assistance, and other community-based services.

State officials and local center leaders said the additional funding would help centers restore positions and programs, retain employees, and maintain access to counseling, advocacy, and crisis response services. The effect of the increase was expected to vary because the organizations differ in size, geography, staffing structure, services, and reliance on state funding.

== Accreditation ==
PCAR was accredited the Pennsylvania Association of Nonprofit Organizations' (PANO) Seal of Excellence.
