= Futures Without Violence =

American nonprofit organization

Futures Without Violence (formerly Family Violence Prevention Fund) is a non-profit organization with offices in San Francisco, Washington, D.C., and Boston, United States, with the goal of building healthier, safer, and more prosperous communities in the United States and around the world. Through innovative programs, award-winning public campaigns, and lasting policy gains, FUTURES advances change across 5 key pillars: preventing violence against women and girls, creating positive pathways for men and boys, improving quality health access at every age, expanding economic opportunity, and building the next generation of courageous leaders. Futures Without Violence is involved in community-based programs, developing educational materials, and in public policy work.

== About ==
The Family Violence Prevention Fund was established in 1980, and renamed Futures Without Violence in 2011, with the goal of ending violence against women and children across the globe. This organization creates international and national campaigns, policies, and programs that focus on the prevention of domestic violence and child abuse. In addition, they train a variety of people, including medical professionals (doctors, nurses, etc.), athletic coaches, and judges, on how to better respond to victims of domestic violence and child abuse. They work with advocates, politicians, and other community leaders to educate people on the importance of healthy relationships and respect.

== Origins ==
In 1980, Esta Soler received a federal grant and founded the Family Violence Prevention Fund. The grant provided more funding and resources for education and training programs in response to domestic violence calls. This led to police departments across the country getting federal funds to go to trainings to respond to and handle domestic violence calls.

== Development ==
Soon after receiving a grant from the Family Violence Prevention Fund and securing nationwide reform of police response to domestic violence cases, Soler partnered up with various organizations to form the Violence Against Women Act (VAWA). The bill was drafted to provide more funding and services for domestic violence shelters across the country. The bill also aimed to change the way police departments and court systems handled domestic violence cases. The Violence Against Women Act (VAWA) provided a landmark foundation for addressing violence and abuse experienced by women. Since the enactment of VAWA on September 13, 1994, there have been renewed efforts to provide more training and intervention programs concerning domestic violence and to continue supporting public education campaigns nationwide. Domestic violence has decreased by 80% since 1980. As a result, the Family Violence Prevention Fund was renamed Futures Without Violence in 2011.

== Shaping Public Policy ==
Futures Without Violence was a driving force behind passage of the Violence Against Women Act of 1994—the nation’s first comprehensive federal response to the violence that plagues families and communities. Congress reauthorized and expanded the law in 2000, 2005, and 2013. The organization is now working with advocates, policymakers, and more to spearhead efforts to pass the International Violence Against Women Act to prevent gender-based violence on a global scale.

== Campaigns ==
=== Coaching Boys into Men ===
In 2001, Futures Without Violence and the Advertising Council launched a public-education campaign called Coaching Boys into Men. This media campaign encourages men to talk to the boys in their life about the importance of respect and nonviolence. The Coaching Boys into Men media campaign included television, radio, and print public service announcements in multiple languages.

In 2004, Coaching Boys Into Men expanded from a media campaign into a sports-based program for athletic coaches to lead with their young male athletes. The Coaching Boys into Men Coaches Leadership Program includes tools and resources to guide coaches in talking to their athletes about respect, non-violence, and relationships. The program provides support materials for coaches to lead weekly activities with their athletes throughout the sports season.

Coaching Boys Into Men also includes work outside of the United States. In 2007, Futures Without Violence and UNICEF partnered to develop and distribute an International Coaches Manual that includes quotes and endorsement from stars such as David Beckham, Emmanuel Adebayor, and Thierry Henry. In 2009, Futures Without Violence began an initiative with the Nike Foundation to develop a cricket-based Coaching Boys Into Men program in India. The program has since been introduced in South Africa, Australia, New Zealand, and Canada.

=== Start Strong: Building Healthy Teen Relationships ===
Start Strong: Building Healthy Teen Relationships is the largest initiative ever funded to target 11- to- 14-year-olds and rally entire communities to promote healthy relationships as the way to prevent teen dating violence and abuse. A national program of the Robert Wood Johnson Foundation (RWJF) in collaboration with Futures Without Violence, the RWJF and Blue Shield of California Foundation invested $18 million in 11 Start Strong communities across the country to identify and evaluate best practices in prevention to stop dating violence and abuse before it starts.

=== RESPECT! ===
The RESPECT! Campaign was a social action campaign designed to promote respect in relationships and increase awareness about the positive role everyone can play to help end and prevent relationship violence and abuse. The RESPECT! Campaign was a multi-year initiative supported by Macy’s, the national founding partner and exclusive retailer of the official RESPECT! bracelet.

=== That's Not Cool ===
In 2009, Futures Without Violence and The Advertising Council launched That’s Not Cool, a national public service advertising campaign that uses digital examples of controlling behavior online and by cell phone to encourage teens to draw their own line about what is, or is not, okay in a relationship. This multimedia campaign, created pro bono by R/GA, includes an interactive website and mobile app.

== Programs ==
=== Health ===
Futures Without Violence provides health care providers with resources to help identify and respond to domestic violence. The organization hosts the biennial National Health Conference on Domestic Violence, convening medical, public health, and domestic violence experts from across the U.S. to advance the health care system’s response to domestic violence. The organization provides technical assistance and materials to thousands of people each year through the National Health Resource Center on Domestic Violence. The Center is one of five specialized domestic violence resource centers in the country funded by the U.S. Department of Health and Human Services.

=== Judicial Education ===
Futures Without Violence’s National Judicial Institute gives judges guidelines, education, and materials to ensure that their courtrooms provide help to victims of family violence.

=== Early Childhood Trauma ===
The Futures Without Violence Children’s Initiative works with domestic violence and batterer intervention programs, child welfare agencies, and community organizers to build collaborations and partnerships that promote safe and healthy families. As the national technical assistance provider of Attorney General Eric Holder's Defending Childhood Initiative to prevent and reverse the impact of early exposure to violence on children, the organization leads the prevention, intervention, treatment, and community organizing strategies used by every Defending Childhood site across the nation.

=== Domestic and Sexual Violence Prevention in the Workplace ===
Futures Without Violence's Workplace Project is a collaboration with employers and unions, and offers an online resource kit which includes items like sample workplace domestic violence policies, education and training materials, case studies, and resources.
