= Walk a Mile in Her Shoes =

North American fundraising event

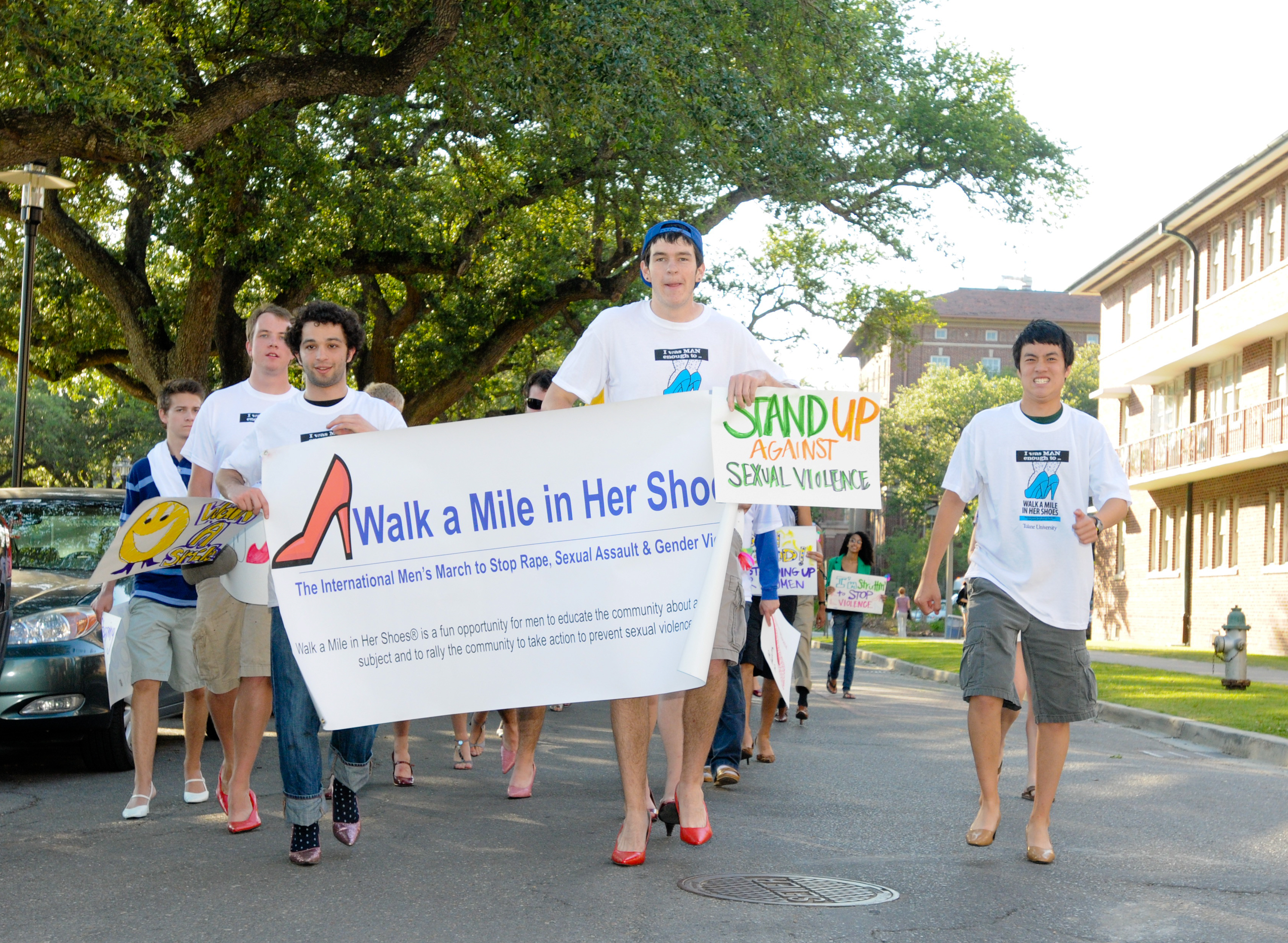
Walk a Mile in Her Shoes Event

Walk a Mile in Her Shoes is a fundraising program that helps raise awareness on domestic violence, gender-based and sexual violence. The fundraising program created a one-mile walking event to promote the awareness that the program discusses and has, since its creation, occurred across North America. The main aspect of the event is that men are asked to walk the mile in red stilettos to advocate for women and other survivors of domestic violence. It has become a global event in which cities, colleges, and universities participate. The participants are asked to wear red high-heels to display their support for the victims of domestic violence, as well as simply being advocates for the violence that women receive.

== History ==
The fundraising program was created in 2001. The program created a walking event to raise awareness and that has since expanded to become a globally renowned march. The idea was created by Frank Baird, a licensed Family Therapist in California, in collaboration with a rape crisis centre, but has since grown to become an event that can be organized by anyone who wants to help raise awareness and start a discussion on sexual assault and gender-based violence.

== Event ==
The event consists of a march where men are typically asked to walk a mile in red high heels. The purpose of the walk is to raise awareness of rape, sexual assault and gender-based violence while also starting a discussion on gender stereotypes and expectations, as explained on the Walk a Mile in Her Shoe's website. The walk has since grown to accept anyone willing to walk in support of the cause.

The event's website helps organizers plan out their events, as well as what should be included if there should be speakers, routes that the walkers should take, how to get access to the shoes for the participants and more.

The recurring aspects of the event helps shed light on the continued problems of femicide in North America and across the world.

== Locations of event ==
	Location	Fund Raising
Cities	Barrie, Ontario	
Cities	Cambridge, Ontario	
Cities	Edmonton, Alberta	
Cities	Hamilton, Ontario	
Cities	Hilo, Hawaii island	
Cities	Peterborough, Ontario	more than 20,000$
Cities	Red Deer, Alberta	
Cities	Regina, Saskatchewan	
Cities	Toronto, Ontario	
Cities	Union County, Ohio	
Universities	Central Arkansas University	
Universities	Indiana University East	
Universities	Millersville University	
College	College of Coastal Georgia	

== Controversy and debates ==
While the event has gained popularity through the years and is known as a program that is meant to help educate and spread awareness on the topic of domestic and gender-based violence, some participants have raised questions about the efficiency of the event. In a thesis written on the issue, questions pertaining to the effectiveness of the awareness on college campuses are indeed useful to the cause and further help the students get educated on the matter or if the event has simply become a "playful" act. The paper raises the issue of enclosing discussions of sexual violence as one that is related strictly to feminism, instead of a discussion of its own.

The ambivalence between the event's method of raising awareness, especially regarding the high heels, and the lack of discussion regarding gender norms is another issue that is brought up regarding the Walk a Mile in Her Shoes event. The thesis in which this concern is brought up explores how discussions on "trans-misogyny" and gender aren't being addressed during these events as well as the consequences linked to those conversations not happening. The article touches on the cisgender aspect of the event and how the main "participant" is meant to be a cis-gendered man, which restricts several groups of people from participating in support of the event.
