= Access for Afghan Women Act =

Bill introduced in U.S. House of Representatives

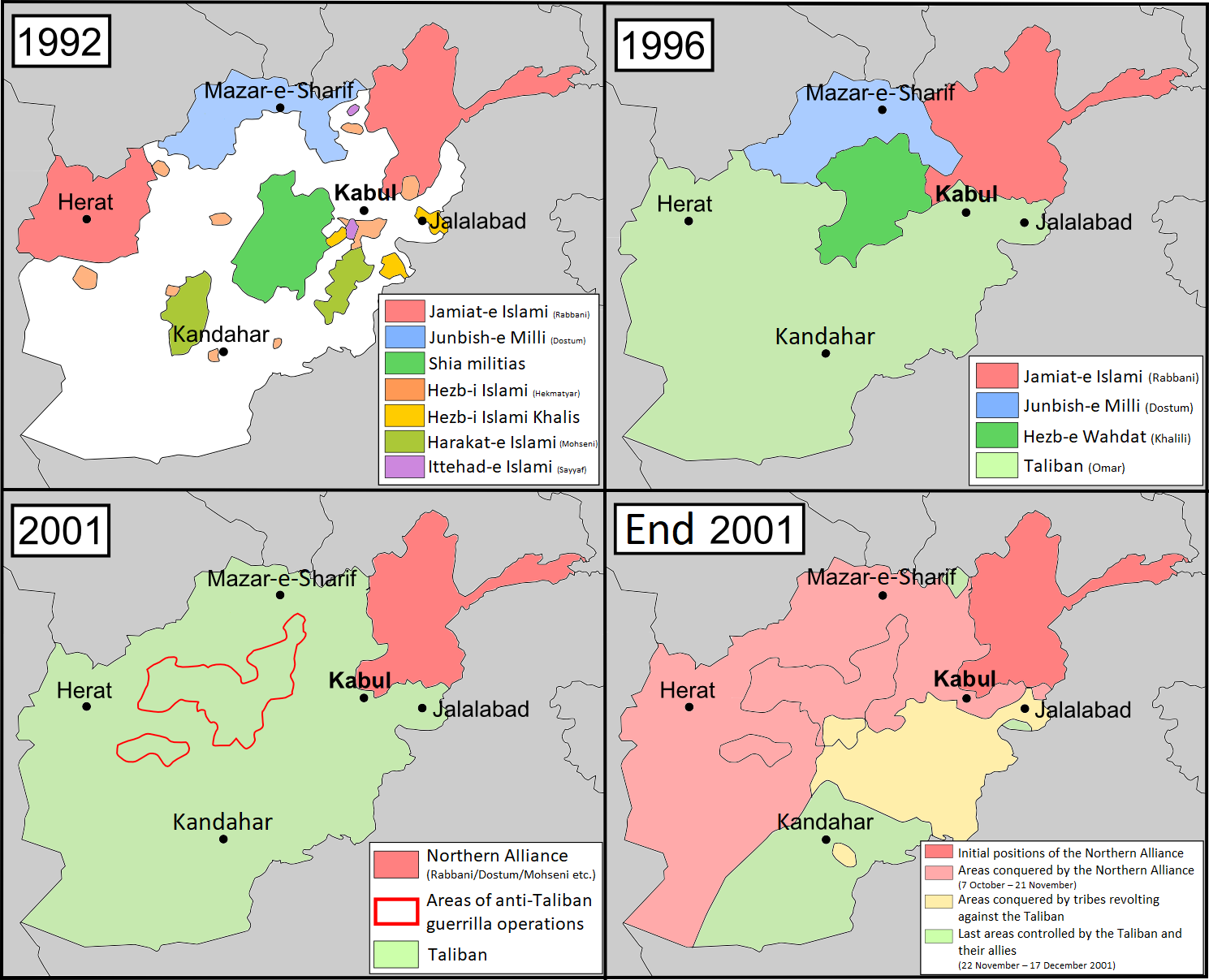
The fight for control over Afghanistan through the years.

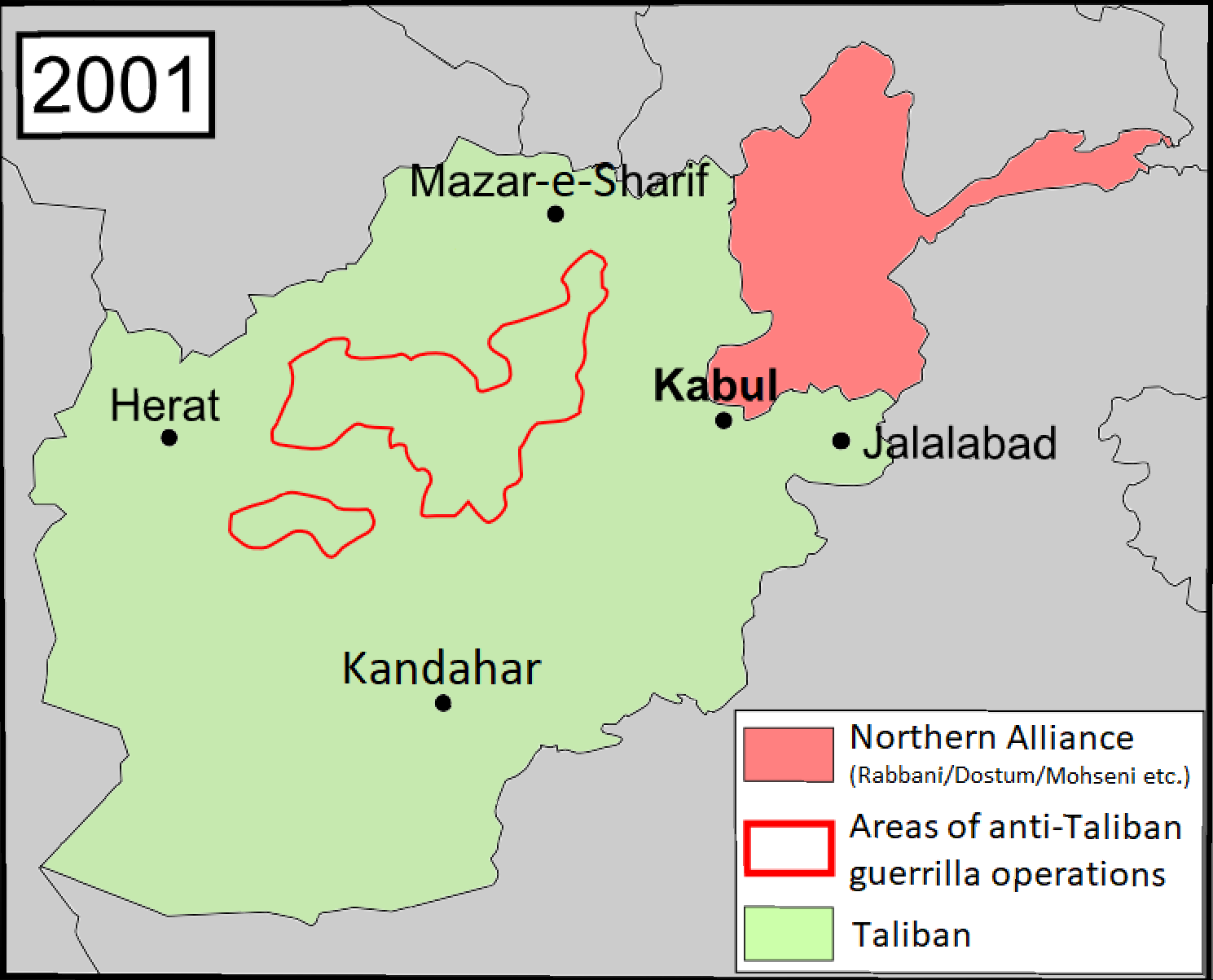
Afghanistan under the Taliban before the United States of America was involved.

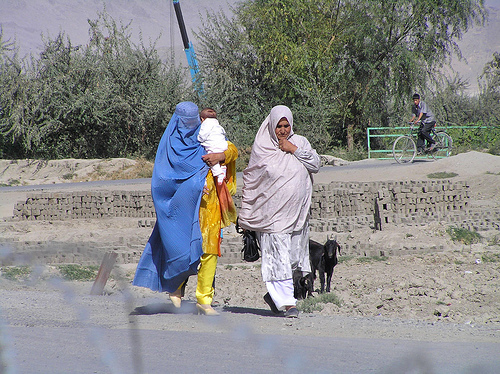
Afghan woman in traditional burqa.

The Access for Afghan Women Act of 2003 (H.R. 1482) is a bill introduced in the United States House of Representatives by Representatives Carolyn Maloney (Democrat, New York) and Dana Rohrabacher (Republican, California). The bill was submitted on March 27, 2003, to the House of Representatives and was immediately referred to the House Committee on International Relations.

== Human rights for Afghan women and girls ==
=== Lead ===
The bill was introduced due to concerns that women remained marginalized in the re-development of Afghanistan. Additionally, in the early 2000s the circumstances of women in Afghanistan remained precarious despite the overthrow of the Taliban regime during the United States-led Afghanistan campaign (U.S. invasion of Afghanistan). The bill addresses assistance for Afghan women and girls in regards to political and human rights, health care, education, training, security, and shelter.

The bill seeks to secure improved circumstances and promote opportunities for women by incorporating them within the reconstruction and on-going development efforts being undertaken in Afghanistan.

The bill attempts to secure these by appropriating funding, establishing aid allocation requirements, defining objectives of United States international policy in Afghanistan, and setting standards of behavior for the United States in executing policy.

=== Article Body ===
From 1996, the Taliban enforced a very strict set of laws known as Sharia, that ultimately isolated women from society. These same laws banned any sort of entertainment such as television or books. After the terrorist attack on September 11, 2001, the United States increasingly started taking control. The events that occurred on 9/11 resulted in U.S involvement in Afghanistan, against the Taliban. The establishment of the Access for Afghan Women Act of 2003 was and continues to be an effort to protect Afghan women and girls from continuing to be oppressed.

Ever since the Taliban took power, young women and girls have been deprived of education in Afghanistan. While the basis of the Access for Afghan Women Act is to provide Afghan women with access to basic human rights such as security, health care, and education, it is also a way to figure out how to educate those who have not had the privilege of having an education for such a long period of time.

=== Current status ===
The "Access for Afghan Women Act," initially introduced to bolster the rights and freedoms of Afghan women, faces significant hurdles in its implementation. With the Taliban's return, there have been widespread concerns about the rollback of women's rights, affecting the Act's core objectives. Reports from UN Women outlets suggest a marked decrease in women's participation in education and the workforce, directly contravening the Act's goals. Furthermore, the international community's engagement in Afghanistan has become more complex, impacting the funding and support essential for the Act's initiatives.

=== Challenges ===
==== Political Instability ====
The resurgence of the Taliban regime has drastically altered the political environment, making it increasingly difficult to enforce the Act's provisions. The Taliban's historical stance on women's rights, particularly their restrictions on education, employment, and freedom of movement, directly conflicts with the Act's objectives. This political shift poses a substantial challenge to advancing women's rights and maintaining the gains made in the past two decades.

==== Cultural and social Barriers ====
Cultural norms and societal attitudes towards women's roles in Afghanistan continue to be significant barriers. Despite legislative efforts, deeply ingrained beliefs and practices often impede the practical application of laws designed to protect and empower women. This cultural resistance necessitates not only legal but also social and educational interventions, which are challenging to implement, especially under a regime that may not support such changes.

==== International Support and Funding ====
The effectiveness of the Act is heavily reliant on international support and funding, which have become uncertain in the current geopolitical climate. With the withdrawal of U.S. troops and reduced international presence, there is a risk of diminished focus and resources dedicated to women's issues in Afghanistan. Ensuring continued support and funding is crucial for the Act's initiatives, yet it is increasingly challenging in the face of shifting global priorities and aid fatigue.

=== Conclusion ===
Overall, the bill attempts to secure human rights for Afghan women by appropriating funding, establishing aid allocation requirements, defining objectives of United States international policy in Afghanistan, and setting standards of behavior for the United States in executing policy.

The text of the bill, its status, and further information can be found at the following site:

Thomas Legislative Information

== See also ==
- Women's rights in Afghanistan
