= The Clothesline Project =

American non-governmental organization

- Founded: 1990
- Founder: Rachel Carey-Harper with a group of women on Cape Cod, Massachusetts
- Type: 501(c)(3)
- Purpose: Violence against women
- Location: Massachusetts

The Clothesline Project is an American non-governmental organization created to bring awareness to the issue of violence against women. For those who have been affected by violence, it is a means of expressing their experiences by decorating a t-shirt. After the shirts have been decorated, they are hung on a clothesline display. The intention of the display is to honor survivors and act as a memorial for victims. It is also intended to aid in the healing process for those who were directly affected and those who have lost someone special to this violence. Lastly, the clothesline display is to educate society and promote awareness about the extent of violent crimes against women.

== History ==
Artist Rachel Carey-Harper came up with the idea of hanging color-coded t-shirts on a clothesline in a public place to gain recognition of the issue after hearing that while 58,000 soldiers died in the Vietnam War, there were 51,000 women killed around the same time by men who claimed to love them. She brought the concept and design to a group of women on Cape Cod, Massachusetts, which started The Clothesline Project in 1990. This motivated the women to create a program that would speak up and reveal the issue of violence against women. Many of the women had personally experienced violence, and Carey-Harper wanted to find an unprecedented, creative way of educating others on this matter. The group thought it was naturally the thing to do, since women were known for doing laundry and exchanging information while their clothes were hanging out to dry.

Each woman has the opportunity to tell her story by decorating a shirt with words and art that represented her experience. She then can hang the shirt on a clothesline for the world to view. The earliest project displayed 31 shirts in Hyannis, Massachusetts as part of the annual "Take Back the Night" March and Rally in October 1990. Since then, The Clothesline Project has received publicity in articles of various magazines and a huge national response turned the project into a worldwide campaign. As of 2011 there were an estimated 500 projects nationally and internationally, involving about 50,000 to 60,000 t-shirts. There were projects in 41 U.S. states and five countries. Since then, it has grown exponentially.

== T-Shirt representation ==
The Clothesline displays shirts that exhibit a great range of abuse. Despite the fact that each individual shirt has one-of-a-kind significance, a color code is used to identify the different forms of abuse:.

- White is for women who died as a result of violent acts.
- Yellow or Beige is for women who have been battered or assaulted.
- Red, pink, and orange represent women survivors of rape and sexual assault.
- Blue or green is for women survivors of incest and sexual abuse.
- Purple or lavender represents women attacked due to their sexual orientation.

Each Clothesline Project operates independently and some lines include:

- Brown or Gray is for survivors of emotional, verbal or spiritual abuse.
- Black is for women assaulted for political reasons or those disabled as a result of an attack or assaulted because of a disability.

== Purpose ==
The Clothesline Project affirms that violence does occur all around us, and in all forms. "It is a visual reminder of statistics that we often ignore." Those who have been silenced can now speak out. The goal is to motivate people to take action. Each display provides information on how to identify and avoid violence, comfort survivors, and impact surrounding regions. It is in honor of survivors who can make a difference by giving their testimony.

== Starting a Clothesline Project ==
Organizing a project requires a lot of dedication and a strong desire to educate others of the effect of violence against women. A group can be started for the project or it can be taken on by an organization. An appropriate event and venue is needed for the first display. Advertising is necessary to make the public aware of the project and to reach out to women who will participate in decorating a t-shirt. When the display is ready and viewers arrive, sounds are incorporated to enhance the experience. A gong is struck approximately every 10 seconds to represent a woman being battered, a whistle is blown to symbolize rape every 1 – 2 minutes, and the sound of a bell rings out every 15 minutes to indicate that a woman has been murdered.
