= Rape crisis centers in the United States =

Charitable organizations network

Rape crisis centers in the United States, usually capitalized as Rape Crisis Center and often abbreviated as RCC, are community-based organizations affiliated with the anti-rape movement in the U.S. Rape crisis centers in other countries offer similar services, but have different histories and vary in their organizational structure.

RCCs work to help victims of rape, sexual abuse, and sexual violence. Central to a community's rape response, RCCs provide a number of services, such as victim advocacy, crisis hotlines, community outreach, and education programs. As social movement organizations, they seek to change social beliefs and institutions, particularly in terms of how rape is understood by medical and legal entities and society at large. In the United States, there is a great deal of diversity in terms of how RCCs are organized, which has implications for their ideological foundations, roles in their communities, and the services they offer.

The National Sexual Assault Hotline (1-800-656-HOPE, operated by RAINN) is a partnership by over 1,100 rape crisis centers.

== History ==
The first American RCCs were formed in several states throughout the country in the early 1970s, largely by women associated with the second-wave feminist movement. Central to second-wave feminism was the practice of consciousness raising, which allowed groups of women to speak openly about their experiences with sexual violence and the shortcomings of law enforcement, health care providers, and the criminal justice system to effectively and constructively respond to survivors. Prior to the 1970s and 1980s several barriers existed for rape survivors seeking justice, such as the fact that the concept of marital rape did not exist, juries were instructed to be suspicious of the validity of the survivor's accusations, eyewitnesses were required to bring cases to court, and survivor blaming was the norm. Employing a feminist analysis, second-wave anti-rape activists began working to redefine rape as a direct outcome of patriarchy and an illustration of women's subordinate status in society relative to men. Rather than relying on traditional notions of rape as a primarily sexual act committed by deviants who are unknown to their survivors, feminists have emphasized the violence of rape, as well how it is embedded in normal social interactions. This redefinition effectively politicized rape, framing it as a larger pattern stemming from women's oppression rather than a series of random, unexplainable criminal acts. From a feminist standpoint, the only way to eliminate rape is to create a society where women and men have equal status. Working from this new feminist definition of rape, anti-rape activists began organizing at the grassroots level, forming the first RCCs. Among the first was the Washington D.C. Rape Crisis Center, founded in 1972 by women identifying with the radical branch of the women's movement. The D.C. RCC published a pamphlet entitled How to Start a Rape Crisis Center, which provided a model for other early RCCs to follow. In line with the prevailing values of the women's movement at that time, early RCCs were nonhierarchical, fairly anti-establishment, and were largely staffed by volunteers. In addition to providing services for rape survivors, such as 24-hour crisis hotlines, legal and medical assistance, referrals, emotional support, and counseling, many early RCCs focused their efforts on raising awareness about rape in their communities by organizing public demonstrations and inviting the media to attend. Such an example is the annual Take Back the Night march, which has become a mainstay in many communities and a means for women to express uncensored anger about sexual violence against women.

The efforts of local anti-rape activists and RCCs to redefine and politicize rape were instrumental in getting rape put onto the national agenda. Once the National Organization for Women identified rape as a priority focus, the anti-rape movement gained an even larger organizational base that could mobilize larger numbers of people and lobby for legal reform. Because of efforts by anti-rape activists and RCCs on local, state, and federal levels, the 1970s and 80s saw many important legislative changes that greatly improved the situation for rape survivors. Among these achievements are the criminalization of marital rape, rendering a rape survivor's prior sexual history inadmissible as evidence in court (rape shield law), repealing the requirement for corroboration in rape cases, and eliminating the requirement that survivors must have physically resisted the attack in order to prosecute. Another important development was expanding the legal definition of rape to include forced oral and anal sex, penetration by a finger or object, and a number of other acts and situations.

Individual activists working with RCCs were often responsible for bringing about these legal successes. For example, in 1980 Anne Pride, director of Pittsburgh Action Against Rape (PAAR) was held in contempt of court for refusing to submit the records of a client to the defence attorney. When the case came to court a mistrial was ruled and the case went to the Supreme Court of Pennsylvania, which ruled in favour of PAAR. This forced the issue of RC counsellors and confidentiality on the political and legislative agenda. By 1983 there was no legal doubt that RC record would remain confidential.

Early RCCs also sought to publicize the problematic manner in which law enforcement, health care providers, the criminal justice system, and the media responded to rape. RCCs would write letters to newspapers, hold press conferences, buy radio and television ads, and distribute flyers to draw negative attention to various actors who committed disservices to rape survivors. Among their primary targets were law enforcement and hospitals. They criticized police officers for being unresponsive to rape survivors and perpetrating what they called a "second rape". For example, it was not uncommon at the time for police officers to question rape survivors about their sexual history or accuse them of provoking their attack. Hospitals received criticism for their treatment of rape survivors, as they had no infrastructure to appropriately treat them and physicians often minimized the seriousness of rape survivors' injuries. Seen as a threat rather than a resource, RCCs largely had a combative relationship with mainstream organizations, a trend that has since changed. Poor relations between RCCs and mainstream organizations eventually became unproductive as law enforcement and physicians would refuse RCC advocates access to rape survivors. Now most RCCs coordinate their activities with law enforcement, hospitals, the criminal justice system, and other mainstream organizations. RCCs also provide mainstream organizations with training and education and work to develop protocols for them to follow. The level of cooperation between RCCs and mainstream organizations and how responsibilities are allocated among them vary from community to community.

== Structure and organization ==
While the goals of RCCs have remained largely unchanged since their creation in the 1970s, they have undergone a number of structural changes. Among these changes is the phenomenon of RCCs moving toward more professionalization and hierarchy and away from the radical activism that defines their roots. Many RCCs, rather than being freestanding collectives, are incorporated into the mainstream organizations that they once worked against, such as hospitals or other social services agencies. These trends are related to the political climate and also the availability of government money to fund their activities. Despite the fact that RCCs now more closely resemble mainstream organizations, they still occupy an important place in the anti-rape movement. When dealing with rape survivors, the fact that RCCs have no interest other than in providing emotional support and assistance to survivors distinguishes them from physicians who are primarily concerned with treating injuries, law enforcement officers who are primarily concerned with ascertaining facts, or prosecutors who primarily concerned with building a case. RCCs are further separated from mainstream organizations by their consistent efforts to reform how these organizations respond to rape, primarily through the provision of training in appropriate rape definitions and responses. This cooperation between RCCs and mainstream organizations represents a shift in RCC strategies; they have moved from being outside critics of mainstream organizations to indoctrinating allies with them.

A close relationship between RCCs and mainstream organizations leads to various opportunities and constraints that affect the quality of a community's responsiveness to rape. Among the opportunities are access to rape survivors that first approach mainstream organizations, the ability to teach mainstream organizations about rape, and the ability to develop responsive interorganizational protocols. Constraints include the inability to publicly criticize the unresponsiveness of mainstream organizations, an increased likelihood of cooptation to mainstream views, a shift of the focus toward survivors and away from social and political change, and a greater tolerance for mainstream unresponsiveness. Depending on the particular RCC, the community in which is works, and its relationship to mainstream organizations, there will be different situations in terms of which opportunities or constraints present themselves. Nonetheless, this situation suggests a much-changed picture from the radical origins of the RCC. While RCCs still employ feminist discourse and engage in political activities, such as demonstrations and lobbying, they have largely lost the radical edge that once defined them.

Communities with RCCs that are integrated into a network with mainstream organizations are the most responsive to rape survivors. Each community has different resources, but some relevant mainstream organizations for such a network include hospitals, law enforcement, prosecutors, feminist groups, university rape awareness programs, mental health centers, and battered women's shelters. The most effective networks for fostering a community's responsiveness are those that are coordinated either by the RCC or the RCC in conjunction with the police. Coordination by the RCC entails establishing the linkages between the various organizations in order to streamline the delivery of services to the rape survivor. Overly centralized networks are generally not as responsive as those that have more interaction between all members of the network. Overall, RCCs provide a central role in managing a community's response to rape and foster increased communication among the various factions that deal with rape survivors.

== Typical services offered ==
Each RCC is unique in the range of services it provides to both survivors and the community. Professionals employed by the RCC, many of whom hold an academic degree in women's studies, psychology, public health, social work, or another relevant discipline, provide these services. Volunteers are also essential to the provision of RCC services and are heavily utilized for a number of essential tasks. Both RCC employees and volunteers are required to undergo a 40-hour training during which they learn a great deal about societal, legal, and cultural aspects of rape.

=== Survivor services ===
- Crisis hotlines are 24-hour, 7-day-a-week phone lines that are offered by almost every RCC. Rape survivors can call and receive crisis intervention counseling free of charge, which may entail comforting the survivor, dispelling common rape myths, explaining legal and medical options, or providing referrals for other useful resources. Volunteers often serve as crisis counselors for RCCs.
- Counseling services, either short-term or long-term may be provided by RCCs to rape survivors in order to promote their psychological well-being in the aftermath of a traumatic event.
- Legal advocates may educate survivors about the legal process, assist them with getting protective orders against their assailant, and accompany survivors to meetings with the prosecutor or to their court date. The criminal justice system can be traumatic for some rape survivors and so legal advocates are present as a source of support. RCCs are generally neutral in terms of encouraging survivors to take legal action against their assailants.
- Medical advocates may educate survivors about forensic medical options and accompany survivors to the hospital to have a sexual assault evidentiary examination. While RCCs are generally neutral in terms of whether or not to proceed with the legal process, they often encourage all survivors to get this examination so that if they later decide to prosecute, they will have evidence to help build their case.
- Sexual Assault Forensic Examiners (SAFE) are medical providers who have received special training to conduct sexual assault evidentiary exams for rape survivors. Historically these providers were nurses and referred to as SANEs (Sexual Assault Nurse Examiners), but nowadays it is recognized that physicians and physician assistants may perform the services. Not all, but many SAFE/SANE programs are coordinated by RCCs rather than hospitals. SAFE/SANEs are on call 24-hours a day and will arrive at the hospital emergency room within an hour of the rape survivor's arrival. In addition to the collection of forensic evidence, they also provide crisis intervention counseling, STI testing, drug testing if drug-facilitated rape is suspected, and emergency contraception.

=== Community Services ===
- Education programs targeting various members of the community is commonplace among RCC activities. RCCs regularly go into schools, faith-based organizations, neighborhood associations, universities, and other places of social gathering to inform people about rape in their community, foster a feminist understanding of rape, dispel common myths about rape, and raise awareness about available services and resources.
- Training of law enforcement, health care providers, and attorneys has been an essential part of improving mainstream responsiveness to rape. RCCs use their expertise to develop programs that improve how rape survivors are treated in legal and medical settings. RCCs also often develop and train mainstream organizations in protocols that create a standard for their collaboration.
- Prevention programs undertaken by RCCs may be part of their educational programs, including teaching definitions of sexual violence, attempts to change survivor-blaming attitudes, engaging in role plays, fostering problem solving strategies, and even teaching self-defense to women so that they may fight off a potential assailant. Part of RCC efforts at prevention entail teaching women rape avoidance, i.e. behavioral strategies to reduce one's chances of getting raped.
- Writing legislation for lawmakers is a means by which RCCs have been able to make important reforms and infuse rape laws with a feminist perspective. RCCs are in a better position to write such laws because lawmakers often lack experience with and knowledge of rape.
- Initiating projects is a way that RCCs can spearhead efforts to get more resources in their communities. RCCs are often seen as ideal candidates to undertake the process of mobilizing support for a particular issue, delegating tasks to various community stakeholders, and applying for funding.
- Outreach programs advertise a Center's existence in the surrounding community. Fundraising and awareness campaigns aid communities in coming together to end sexual violence. In recent years RCCs have begun working on outreach projects with faith based communities, LGBTQ communities, and other groups of individuals who share a cultural identity. Some outreach projects specifically serve non-English speaking people in their respective communities.

== Funding ==
RCCs may receive funding from a number of sources and funding can vary greatly for each RCC depending on its location, if it is affiliated with a host agency, and the type of host agency. RCCs housed in hospitals and county social service and health agencies generally have more funding than those situated in mental health centers, battered women's shelters, and legal-justice organizations. The funding situation today has changed a great deal from that of the early 1970s when RCCs were just beginning to start up. Operating on small budgets, membership fees and donations from the community made up the majority of early RCC funds. Federal funding sources for sexual assault started to become available from the mid-1970s through the 1990s, which has had implications for how RCCs are organized. To be eligible for federal funding, RCCs have to demonstrate that they had support from the community, organizational stability, as well as the ability to maintain programs beyond initial funding. These funding requirements have been a major force pushing RCCs to become more professionalized and to model themselves on a social service agency structure.

Some of the current major sources of federal funding available to support rape crisis centers are the Violence Against Women Act of 1994 (VAWA), the Victims of Crime Act of 1984 (VOCA) and the Preventive Health and Health Services Block Grant (PHHSBG). VAWA allocated $1.6 billion to states from 1994 to 2000, with about one third designated for survivors of sexual assault. These funds are administered by the Office on Violence Against Women in the United States Department of Justice. VOCA, also administered by the Department of Justice, established a fund made up of fines paid by offenders. These funds are then allocated to organizations providing services to survivors, with priority going to those addressing sexual assault, spousal abuse, and child abuse. VOCA funds are also available for statewide programs that provide compensation to survivors. The PHHSBG is administered by the CDC to fund a number of preventive health services and programs, such as those involving rape education and prevention. While the bulk of PHHS funds go to chronic disease, sex offense represented 8.5% of the designated funds in 2010, totaling over $7 million. Other federal sources that provide or have provided funding to RCCs are the National Institute of Mental Health's National Center for the Prevention of Rape, the Law Enforcement Assistance Administration, and the Department of Labor's Comprehensive Employment and Training Act.

In addition to federal funding, state or county funding, funding from other non-profit organizations, corporate funding, and private donations represent possible avenues for RCC financial support. Some states and counties have, for example, set up sexual assault funds through tax revenues as a means to express local support for the important services that RCCs provide to their communities. Non-profits that administer grants for a number of social programs, such as the United Way of America, may fund RCCs or other organizations providing services for survivors of physical and sexual violence. Corporations have also stepped up to fund, or attempt to fund, RCCs. For example, the Playboy Foundation was among the most visible corporate donors for the women's movement in the mid- to late-1970s, but many groups refused this funding for political and ideological reasons. RCCs also rely on the funds that they can generate themselves, through soliciting donations and fundraising efforts. As with many social service agencies, RCCs are virtually in a constant state of trying to secure funding so that they can maintain their program activities.

== See also ==
- Centres Against Sexual Assault (Victoria, Australia)
- Domestic violence
- Emergency contraception, also known as "the morning after pill"
- International Violence Against Women Act
- Rape crisis movement
- Rape statistics
- Sexual harassment
- Thuthuzela Care Centre, a model used in South Africa
- Types of rape
