= International Violence Against Women Act =

Legislation proposed in 2015 in the US

The International Violence Against Women Act of 2015 (I-VAWA) is proposed legislation to address violence against women through United States foreign policy. The legislation was introduced in the 114th United States Congress in March, 2015. Similar legislation was introduced in the 110th and 111th United States Congress but was not passed into law.

== Background ==
At least 1 in 3 women around the world are subject to sexual, physical or other abuse during their life, per estimates by the United Nations Development Fund for Women. Not only does violence against women prevent mothers from raising healthy children, it also affects the economic progress and stability within the country in which they live.

== International Violence Against Women Act of 2015 ==
The International Violence Against Women Act of 2015 (I-VAWA) (S. 713, H.R. 1340) was introduced to ensure that addressing violence against women is included in the nation's foreign policy, with best practices for preventing violence, protecting victims and prosecuting offenders.

The legislation was the result of efforts by:

- Amnesty International USA
- Futures Without Violence
- Women Thrive Worldwide.

Experts in related fields from 40 international and 150 U.S. groups provided input for the legislation.

The House of Representatives Bill (HR. 1340) was brought before the 114th Congress, sponsored by Representative Janice Schakowsky, Illinois's 9th congressional district. The Senate Bill (S.713), was introduced by Senator Barbara Boxer of California.

== Criticism ==
I-VAWA has been criticized on the grounds that it would discriminate against male victims and impose Western values upon other societies. According to Wendy McElroy, a research fellow at The Independent Institute, the Act "constitutes a 5-year redirection of foreign aid funds in order to insert politically-correct feminism into the structure of other nations" and "revictimizes every male victim by denying his existence."

== Organizations ==
Many organizations support the I-VAWA Act, some of which are:

- Amnesty International USA
- American Jewish World Service
- Human Rights Watch
- International Center for Research on Women
- International Rescue Committee
- Refugees International
- Vital Voices
- Women's Refugee Commission

== See also ==
- Child Protective Services
- Domestic violence
- Futures Without Violence
- Rape culture
- Relationship education
- Violence Against Women Act
