= List of acts of the 103rd United States Congress =

The 103rd United States Congress, which began on January 3, 1993, and ended on January 3, 1995, enacted 465 public laws and 8 private laws.

== Public laws ==
The following 465 public laws were enacted during this Congress:

Public law number	Date of enactment	Official short title(s)	Official title	Link to GPO
103–1	January 15, 1993	(No short title)	A joint resolution to authorize the United States Secret Service to continue to furnish protection to the former Vice President or his spouse.	Pub. L. 103–1, S.J.Res. 2, 107 Stat. 3
103–2	January 19, 1993	(No short title)	A joint resolution to ensure that the compensation and other emoluments attached to the office of Secretary of the Treasury are those which were in effect on January 1, 1989.	Pub. L. 103–2, S.J.Res. 1, 107 Stat. 4
103–3	February 5, 1993	Family and Medical Leave Act of 1993	To grant family and temporary medical leave under certain circumstances.	Pub. L. 103–3, H.R. 1, 107 Stat. 6
103–4	February 8, 1993	(No short title)	A bill to designate the Federal Judiciary Building in Washington, D.C., as the Thurgood Marshall Federal Judiciary Building.	Pub. L. 103–4, S. 202, 107 Stat. 30
103–5	February 25, 1993	(No short title)	To designate February 21 through February 27, 1993, as "National FFA Organization Awareness Week".	Pub. L. 103–5, H.J.Res. 101, 107 Stat. 31
103–6	March 4, 1993	Emergency Unemployment Compensation Amendments of 1993	To extend the emergency unemployment compensation program, and for other purposes.	Pub. L. 103–6, H.R. 920, 107 Stat. 33
103–7	March 17, 1993	Aircraft Equipment Settlement Leases Act of 1993	A bill to amend the Employee Retirement Income Security Act of 1974 to provide for the treatment of settlement agreements reached with the Pension Benefit Guaranty Corporation.	Pub. L. 103–7, S. 400, 107 Stat. 36
103–8	March 20, 1993	(No short title)	A joint resolution designating March 25, 1993 as "Greek Independence Day: A National Day of Celebration of Greek and American Democracy".	Pub. L. 103–8, S.J.Res. 22, 107 Stat. 37
103–9	March 20, 1993	(No short title)	A joint resolution to proclaim March 20, 1993, as "National Agriculture Day".	Pub. L. 103–9, S.J.Res. 36, 107 Stat. 38
103–10	March 27, 1993	(No short title)	To extend the Export Administration Act of 1979 and to authorize appropriations under that Act for fiscal years 1993 and 1994.	Pub. L. 103–10, H.R. 750, 107 Stat. 40
103–11	April 1, 1993	(No short title)	An Act to extend the suspended implementation of certain requirements of the food stamp program on Indian reservations, and for other purposes.	Pub. L. 103–11, S. 284, 107 Stat. 41
103–12	April 6, 1993	(No short title)	To provide for a temporary increase in the public debt limit.	Pub. L. 103–12, H.R. 1430, 107 Stat. 42
103–13	April 7, 1993	(No short title)	To amend the Airport and Airway Safety, Capacity, Noise Improvement, and Intermodal Transportation Act of 1992 with respect to the establishment of the National Commission to Ensure a Strong Competitive Airline Industry.	Pub. L. 103–13, H.R. 904, 107 Stat. 43
103–14	April 12, 1993	(No short title)	Designating April 2, 1993, as "Education and Sharing Day, U.S.A.".	Pub. L. 103–14, H.J.Res. 150, 107 Stat. 45
103–15	April 12, 1993	(No short title)	Concerning the dedication of the United States Holocaust Memorial Museum.	Pub. L. 103–15, H.J.Res. 156, 107 Stat. 47
103–16	April 12, 1993	(No short title)	A bill to authorize the adjustment of the boundaries of the South Dakota portion of the Sioux Ranger District of Custer National Forest, and for other purposes.	Pub. L. 103–16, S. 164, 107 Stat. 49
103–17	April 12, 1993	Idaho Land Exchange Act of 1993	A bill to provide for certain land exchanges in the State of Idaho, and for other purposes.	Pub. L. 103–17, S. 252, 107 Stat. 50
103–18	April 12, 1993	(No short title)	A bill to amend title 38, United States Code, and title XIX of the Social Security Act to make technical corrections relating to the Veterans Health Care Act of 1992.	Pub. L. 103–18, S. 662, 107 Stat. 53
103–19	April 12, 1993	(No short title)	A joint resolution providing for the appointment of Hanna Holborn Gray as a citizen regent of the Board of Regents of the Smithsonian Institution.	Pub. L. 103–19, S.J.Res. 27, 107 Stat. 55
103–20	April 12, 1993	(No short title)	A joint resolution to provide for the appointment of Barber B. Conable, Jr., as a citizen regent of the Board of Regents of the Smithsonian Institution.	Pub. L. 103–20, S.J.Res. 28, 107 Stat. 56
103–21	April 12, 1993	(No short title)	A joint resolution providing for the appointment of Wesley Samuel Williams, Jr., as a citizen regent of the Board of Regents of the Smithsonian Institution.	Pub. L. 103–21, S.J.Res. 29, 107 Stat. 57
103–22	April 12, 1993	(No short title)	A joint resolution designating March 1993 and March 1994 both as "Women's History Month".	Pub. L. 103–22, S.J.Res. 53, 107 Stat. 58
103–23	April 16, 1993	(No short title)	To amend the Stock Raising Homestead Act to resolve certain problems regarding subsurface estates, and for other purposes.	Pub. L. 103–23, H.R. 239, 107 Stat. 60
103–24	April 23, 1993	Emergency Supplemental Appropriations Act of 1993	Making emergency supplemental appropriations for the fiscal year ending September 30, 1993, and for other purposes.	Pub. L. 103–24, H.R. 1335, 107 Stat. 67
103–25	May 3, 1993	(No short title)	A bill to revise the boundaries of the George Washington Birthplace National Monument, and for other purposes.	Pub. L. 103–25, S. 326, 107 Stat. 68
103–26	May 3, 1993	(No short title)	A bill to provide for the rehabilitation of historic structures within the Sandy Hook Unit of Gateway National Recreation Area in the State of New Jersey, and for other purposes.	Pub. L. 103–26, S. 328, 107 Stat. 70
103–27	May 3, 1993	(No short title)	A joint resolution to designate the weeks of April 25 through May 2, 1993, and April 10 through 17, 1994, as "Jewish Heritage Week".	Pub. L. 103–27, S.J.Res. 30, 107 Stat. 72
103–28	May 6, 1993	(No short title)	To authorize the President to proclaim the last Friday of April 1993 as "National Arbor Day".	Pub. L. 103–28, H.J.Res. 127, 107 Stat. 74
103–29	May 6, 1993	(No short title)	A joint resolution to designate the week beginning April 25, 1993, as "National Crime Victims' Rights Week".	Pub. L. 103–29, S.J.Res. 62, 107 Stat. 75
103–30	May 7, 1993	(No short title)	A joint resolution to designate the weeks beginning April 18, 1993, and April 17, 1994, each as "National Organ and Tissue Donor Awareness Week".	Pub. L. 103–30, S.J.Res. 66, 107 Stat. 76
103–31	May 20, 1993	National Voter Registration Act of 1993	To establish national voter registration procedures for Federal elections, and for other purposes.	Pub. L. 103–31, H.R. 2, 107 Stat. 77
103–32	May 25, 1993	(No short title)	A bill to authorize the construction of a memorial on Federal land in the District of Columbia or its environs to honor members of the Armed Forces who served in World War II and to commemorate United States participation in that conflict.	Pub. L. 103–32, S. 214, 107 Stat. 90
103–33	May 25, 1993	(No short title)	A bill to authorize the conduct and development of NAEP assessments for fiscal year 1994.	Pub. L. 103–33, S. 801, 107 Stat. 93
103–34	May 31, 1993	(No short title)	Designating June 1, 1993, through June 7, 1993, as a "Week for the National Observance of the Fiftieth Anniversary of World War II".	Pub. L. 103–34, H.J.Res. 80, 107 Stat. 95
103–35	May 31, 1993	(No short title)	To amend title 10, United States Code, with respect to applicability of qualification requirements for certain acquisition positions in the Department of Defense.	Pub. L. 103–35, H.R. 1378, 107 Stat. 97
103–36	June 8, 1993	Central Intelligence Agency Voluntary Separation Pay Act	To authorize the establishment of a program under which employees of the Central Intelligence Agency may be offered separation pay to separate from service voluntarily to avoid or minimize the need for involuntary separations due to downsizing, reorganization, transfer of function, or other similar action.	Pub. L. 103–36, H.R. 1723, 107 Stat. 104
103–37	June 8, 1993	(No short title)	To amend the Immigration and Nationality Act to authorize appropriations for refugee assistance for fiscal years 1993 and 1994.	Pub. L. 103–37, H.R. 2128, 107 Stat. 107
103–38	June 8, 1993	(No short title)	Designating the weeks beginning May 23, 1993, and May 15, 1994, as "Emergency Medical Services Week".	Pub. L. 103–38, H.J.Res. 78, 107 Stat. 108
103–39	June 8, 1993	(No short title)	To designate the months of May 1993 and May 1994 as "National Trauma Awareness Month".	Pub. L. 103–39, H.J.Res. 135, 107 Stat. 110
103–40	June 8, 1993	Government Printing Office Electronic Information Access Enhancement Act of 1993	A bill to establish in the Government Printing Office a means of enhancing electronic public access to a wide range of Federal electronic information.	Pub. L. 103–40, S. 564, 107 Stat. 112
103–41	June 8, 1993	(No short title)	A joint resolution designating the week beginning June 6, 1993, and June 5, 1994, as "Lyme Disease Awareness Week".	Pub. L. 103–41, S.J.Res. 43, 107 Stat. 115
103–42	June 10, 1993	National Cooperative Production Amendments of 1993	To amend the National Cooperative Research Act of 1984 with respect to joint ventures entered into for the purpose of producing a product, process, or service.	Pub. L. 103–42, H.R. 1313, 107 Stat. 117
103–43	June 10, 1993	National Institutes of Health Revitalization Act of 1993	A bill to amend the Public Health Service Act to revise and extend the programs of the National Institutes of Health, and for other purposes.	Pub. L. 103–43, S. 1, 107 Stat. 122
103–44	June 28, 1993	Unclaimed Deposits Amendments Act of 1993	To amend the Federal Deposit Insurance Act to provide for extended periods of time for claims on insured deposits.	Pub. L. 103–44, H.R. 890, 107 Stat. 220
103–45	July 1, 1993	Forest Resources Conservation and Shortage Relief Amendments Act of 1993	To amend the Forest Resources Conservation and Shortage Relief Act of 1990 to permit States to adopt timber export programs, and for other purposes.	Pub. L. 103–45, H.R. 2343, 107 Stat. 223
103–46	July 1, 1993	Big Thicket National Preserve Addition Act of 1993	A bill to increase the size of the Big Thicket National Preserve in the State of Texas by adding the Village Creek Corridor Unit, the Big Sandy Corridor unit, and the Canyonlands Unit.	Pub. L. 103–46, S. 80, 107 Stat. 229
103–47	July 1, 1993	(No short title)	A joint resolution to designate July 1, 1993, as "National NYSP Day".	Pub. L. 103–47, S.J.Res. 88, 107 Stat. 232
103–48	July 2, 1993	(No short title)	To resolve the status of certain land relinquished to the United States under the Act of June 4, 1897 (30 Stat. 11, 36), and for other purposes.	Pub. L. 103–48, H.R. 765, 107 Stat. 234
103–49	July 2, 1993	(No short title)	To provide authority for the President to enter into trade agreements to conclude the Uruguay Round of multilateral trade negotiations under the auspices of the General Agreement on Tariffs and Trade, to extend tariff proclamation authority to carry out such agreements, and to apply Congressional "fast track" procedures to a bill implementing such agreements.	Pub. L. 103–49, H.R. 1876, 107 Stat. 239
103–50	July 2, 1993	Supplemental Appropriations Act of 1993	Making supplemental appropriations for the fiscal year ending September 30, 1993, and for other purposes.	Pub. L. 103–50, H.R. 2118, 107 Stat. 241
103–51	July 16, 1993	(No short title)	To designate the facility of the United States Postal Service located at 20 South Main in Beaver, Utah, as the "Abe Murdock United States Post Office Building".	Pub. L. 103–51, H.R. 588, 107 Stat. 270
103–52	July 16, 1993	(No short title)	Designating July 2, 1993 and July 2, 1994, as "National Literacy Day".	Pub. L. 103–52, H.J.Res. 213, 107 Stat. 271
103–53	July 22, 1993	(No short title)	Designating July 17 through July 23, 1993, as "National Veterans Golden Age Games Week".	Pub. L. 103–53, H.J.Res. 190, 107 Stat. 273
103–54	July 28, 1993	(No short title)	To authorize the transfer of naval vessels to certain foreign countries.	Pub. L. 103–54, H.R. 2561, 107 Stat. 274
103–55	July 28, 1993	Armored Car Industry Reciprocity Act of 1993	To entitle certain armored car crew members to lawfully carry a weapon in any State while protecting the security of valuable goods in interstate commerce in the service of an armored car company.	Pub. L. 103–55, H.R. 1189, 107 Stat. 276
103–56	August 2, 1993	Cave Creek Canyon Protection Act of 1993	To withdraw certain lands located in the Coronado National Forest from the mining and mineral leasing laws of the United States, and for other purposes.	Pub. L. 103–56, H.R. 843, 107 Stat. 278
103–57	August 2, 1993	(No short title)	To authorize the Board of Regents of the Smithsonian Institution to plan and design an extension of the National Air and Space Museum at Washington Dulles International Airport, and for other purposes.	Pub. L. 103–57, H.R. 847, 107 Stat. 279
103–58	August 2, 1993	(No short title)	To modify the boundary of Hot Springs National Park.	Pub. L. 103–58, H.R. 1347, 107 Stat. 280
103–59	August 2, 1993	(No short title)	To extend the operation of the migrant student record transfer system.	Pub. L. 103–59, H.R. 2683, 107 Stat. 281
103–60	August 2, 1993	(No short title)	A joint resolution designating April 9, 1993, and April 9, 1994, as "National Former Prisoner of War Recognition Day".	Pub. L. 103–60, S.J.Res. 54, 107 Stat. 282
103–61	August 2, 1993	(No short title)	A joint resolution to designate August 1, 1993, as "Helsinki Human Rights Day".	Pub. L. 103–61, S.J.Res. 111, 107 Stat. 283
103–62	August 3, 1993	Government Performance and Results Act of 1993	To provide for the establishment of strategic planning and performance measurement in the Federal Government, and for other purposes.	Pub. L. 103–62, S. 20, 107 Stat. 285
103–63	August 4, 1993	Spring Mountains National Recreation Area Act	To establish the Spring Mountains National Recreation Area in Nevada, and for other purposes.	Pub. L. 103–63, H.R. 63, 107 Stat. 297
103–64	August 4, 1993	(No short title)	To establish the Snake River Birds of Prey National Conservation Area in the State of Idaho, and for other purposes.	Pub. L. 103–64, H.R. 236, 107 Stat. 302
103–65	August 6, 1993	(No short title)	To extend the period during which chapter 12 of title 11 of the United States Code remains in effect, and for other purposes.	Pub. L. 103–65, H.R. 416, 107 Stat. 311
103–66	August 10, 1993	Omnibus Budget Reconciliation Act of 1993	To provide for reconciliation pursuant to section 7 of the concurrent resolution on the budget for fiscal year 1994.	Pub. L. 103–66, H.R. 2264, 107 Stat. 312
103–67	August 11, 1993	(No short title)	To provide for the conveyance of certain lands and improvements in Washington, District of Columbia, to the Columbia Hospital for Women to provide a site for the construction of a facility to house the National Women's Health Resource Center.	Pub. L. 103–67, H.R. 490, 107 Stat. 686
103–68	August 11, 1993	(No short title)	To amend the Securities Exchange Act of 1934 to permit members of national securities exchanges to effect certain transactions with respect to accounts for which such members exercise investment discretion.	Pub. L. 103–68, H.R. 616, 107 Stat. 691
103–69	August 11, 1993	Legislative Branch Appropriations Act, 1994	Making appropriations for the Legislative Branch for the fiscal year ending September 30, 1994, and for other purposes.	Pub. L. 103–69, H.R. 2348, 107 Stat. 692
103–70	August 11, 1993	(No short title)	To authorize the Administrator of the Federal Aviation Administration to conduct appropriate programs and activities to acknowledge the status of the county of Fond du Lac, Wisconsin, as the "World Capital of Aerobatics", and for other purposes.	Pub. L. 103–70, H.J.Res. 110, 107 Stat. 714
103–71	August 11, 1993	(No short title)	To designate September 13, 1993, as "Commodore John Barry Day".	Pub. L. 103–71, H.J.Res. 157, 107 Stat. 715
103–72	August 11, 1993	Fluid Milk Promotion Amendments Act of 1993	A bill to amend the Fluid Milk Promotion Act of 1990 to define fluid milk processors to exclude de minimis processors, and for other purposes.	Pub. L. 103–72, S. 1205, 107 Stat. 717
103–73	August 11, 1993	Rehabilitation Act Amendments of 1993	A bill to amend the Rehabilitation Act of 1973 and the Education of the Deaf Act of 1986 to make technical and conforming amendments to the Act, and for other purposes.	Pub. L. 103–73, S. 1295, 107 Stat. 718
103–74	August 11, 1993	(No short title)	A joint resolution designating September 9, 1993, and April 21, 1994, each as "National D.A.R.E. Day".	Pub. L. 103–74, S.J.Res. 99, 107 Stat. 737
103–75	August 12, 1993	Emergency Supplemental Appropriations for Relief From the Major, Widespread Flooding in the Midwest Act of 1993	Making emergency supplemental appropriations for relief from the major, widespread flooding in the Midwest for the fiscal year ending September 30, 1993, and for other purposes.	Pub. L. 103–75, H.R. 2667, 107 Stat. 739
103–76	August 12, 1993	Depository Institutions Disaster Relief Act of 1993	A bill to enhance the availability of credit in disaster areas by reducing the regulatory burden imposed upon insured depository institutions to the extent such action is consistent with the safety and soundness of the institutions.	Pub. L. 103–76, S. 1273, 107 Stat. 752
103–77	August 13, 1993	Colorado Wilderness Act of 1993	To designate certain lands in the State of Colorado as components of the National Wilderness Preservation System, and for other purposes.	Pub. L. 103–77, H.R. 631, 107 Stat. 756
103–78	August 13, 1993	Veterans' Compensation Rates Codification Act of 1993	To amend title 38, United States Code, to codify the rates of disability compensation for veterans with service-connected disabilities and the rates of dependency and indemnity compensation for survivors of such veterans as such rates took effect on December 1, 1992.	Pub. L. 103–78, H.R. 798, 107 Stat. 767
103–79	August 13, 1993	(No short title)	An Act to authorize major medical facility projects and leases for the Department of Veterans' Affairs, to revise and extend the authority of the Secretary of Veterans' Affairs to enter into enhanced-use leases, to revise certain authorities relating to Pershing Hall, France, and for other purposes.	Pub. L. 103–79, H.R. 2034, 107 Stat. 770
103–80	August 13, 1993	(No short title)	To clarify and revise the small business exemption from the nutrition labeling requirements of the Federal Food, Drug, and Cosmetic Act and for other purposes.	Pub. L. 103–80, H.R. 2900, 107 Stat. 773
103–81	August 13, 1993	Small Business Guaranteed Credit Enhancement Act of 1993	An Act to reduce the subsidy cost for the Guaranteed Business Loan Program of the Small Business Administration, and for other purposes.	Pub. L. 103–81, S. 1274, 107 Stat. 780
103–82	September 21, 1993	National and Community Service Trust Act of 1993	To amend the National and Community Service Act of 1990 to establish a Corporation for National Service, enhance opportunities for national service, and provide national service educational awards to persons participating in such service, and for other purposes.	Pub. L. 103–82, H.R. 2010, 107 Stat. 785
103–83	September 21, 1993	(No short title)	A joint resolution to designate the weeks of September 19, 1993, through September 25, 1993, and of September 18, 1994, through September 24, 1994, as "National Rehabilitation Week".	Pub. L. 103–83, S.J.Res. 50, 107 Stat. 924
103–84	September 21, 1993	(No short title)	A joint resolution to designate October 1993 as "National Breast Cancer Awareness Month".	Pub. L. 103–84, S.J.Res. 95, 107 Stat. 926
103–85	September 21, 1993	(No short title)	A joint resolution designating September 10, 1993, as "National POW/MIA Recognition Day" and authorizing the display of the National League of Families POW/MIA flag.	Pub. L. 103–85, S.J.Res. 126, 107 Stat. 928
103–86	September 30, 1993	(No short title)	To extend the current interim exemption under the Marine Mammal Protection Act for commercial fisheries until April 1, 1994.	Pub. L. 103–86, H.R. 3049, 107 Stat. 930
103–87	September 30, 1993	Foreign Operations, Export Financing, and Related Programs Appropriations Act, 1994	Making appropriations for foreign operations, export financing, and related programs for the fiscal year ending September 30, 1994, and for other purposes.	Pub. L. 103–87, H.R. 2295, 107 Stat. 931
103–88	September 30, 1993	(No short title)	Making continuing appropriations for the fiscal year 1994, and for other purposes.	Pub. L. 103–88, H.J.Res. 267, 107 Stat. 977
103–89	September 30, 1993	Performance Management and Recognition System Termination Act	To amend title 5, United States Code, to provide for a temporary extension and the orderly termination of the performance management and recognition system, and for other purposes.	Pub. L. 103–89, H.R. 3019, 107 Stat. 981
103–90	October 1, 1993	(No short title)	To designate the Federal building to be constructed between Gay and Market Streets and Cumberland and Church Avenues in Knoxville, Tennessee, as the "Howard H. Baker, Jr. United States Courthouse".	Pub. L. 103–90, H.R. 168, 107 Stat. 986
103–91	October 1, 1993	Gallatin Range Consolidation and Protection Act of 1993	To provide for the consolidation and protection of the Gallatin Range.	Pub. L. 103–91, H.R. 873, 107 Stat. 987
103–92	October 1, 1993	(No short title)	To designate the month of August as "National Scleroderma Awareness Month", and for other purposes.	Pub. L. 103–92, H.J.Res. 220, 107 Stat. 994
103–93	October 1, 1993	Utah Schools and Lands Improvement Act of 1993	A bill to provide for the exchange of certain lands within the State of Utah, and for other purposes.	Pub. L. 103–93, S. 184, 107 Stat. 995
103–94	October 6, 1993	Hatch Act Reform Amendments of 1993	To amend title 5, United States Code, to restore to Federal civilian employees their right to participate voluntarily, as private citizens, in the political processes of the Nation, to protect such employees from improper political solicitations, and for other purposes.	Pub. L. 103–94, H.R. 20, 107 Stat. 1001
103–95	October 6, 1993	(No short title)	To designate the United States courthouse located at 10th and Main Streets in Richmond, Virginia, as the "Lewis F. Powell, Jr. United States Courthouse".	Pub. L. 103–95, H.R. 1513, 107 Stat. 1012
103–96	October 6, 1993	(No short title)	To designate the Federal building in Jacksonville, Florida, as the "Charles E. Bennett Federal Building".	Pub. L. 103–96, H.R. 2431, 107 Stat. 1013
103–97	October 6, 1993	(No short title)	To redesignate the Pulaski Post Office located at 111 West College Street in Pulaski, Tennessee, as the "Ross Bass Post Office".	Pub. L. 103–97, S. 464, 107 Stat. 1014
103–98	October 6, 1993	(No short title)	To continue the authorization of appropriations for the East Court of the National Museum of Natural History, and for other purposes.	Pub. L. 103–98, S. 779, 107 Stat. 1015
103–99	October 6, 1993	(No short title)	To designate the week of October 3, 1993, through October 9, 1993, as "Mental Illness Awareness Week".	Pub. L. 103–99, S.J.Res. 61, 107 Stat. 1016
103–100	October 6, 1993	(No short title)	To designate October 6, 1993 and 1994, as "German-American Day".	Pub. L. 103–100, S.J.Res. 121, 107 Stat. 1018
103–101	October 8, 1993	(No short title)	To authorize appropriations for the American Folklife Center for fiscal years 1994, 1995, 1996, and 1997.	Pub. L. 103–101, H.R. 2074, 107 Stat. 1020
103–102	October 8, 1993	(No short title)	To provide that certain property located in the State of Oklahoma owned by an Indian housing authority for the purpose of providing low-income housing shall be treated as Federal property under the Act of September 30, 1950 (Public Law 874, 81st Congress).	Pub. L. 103–102, H.R. 3051, 107 Stat. 1021
103-103	October 8, 1993	Federal Employees Leave Sharing Amendments Act of 1993	To provide for continuing authorization of Federal employee leave transfer and leave bank programs, and for other purposes.	Pub. L. 103–103, S. 1130, 107 Stat. 1022
103–104	October 12, 1993	(No short title)	To establish the Jemez National Recreation Area in the State of New Mexico, and for other purposes.	Pub. L. 103–104, H.R. 38, 107 Stat. 1025
103–105	October 12, 1993	(No short title)	To provide for the reauthorization of the collection and publication of quarterly financial statistics by the Secretary of Commerce through fiscal year 1998, and for other purposes.	Pub. L. 103–105, H.R. 2608, 107 Stat. 1030
103–106	October 12, 1993	National Forest Foundation Act Amendment Act of 1993	To improve administrative services and support provided to the National Forest Foundation, and for other purposes.	Pub. L. 103–106, S. 1381, 107 Stat. 1031
103–107	October 12, 1993	(No short title)	To designate the months of October 1993 and October 1994 as "Country Music Month".	Pub. L. 103–107, S.J.Res. 102, 107 Stat. 1033
103–108	October 18, 1993	(No short title)	Designating October 16, 1993, and October 16, 1994, each as World Food Day.	Pub. L. 103–108, H.J.Res. 218, 107 Stat. 1034
103–109	October 18, 1993	(No short title)	To designate October 19, 1993, as "National Mammography Day".	Pub. L. 103–109, H.J.Res. 265, 107 Stat. 1036
103–110	October 21, 1993	Military Construction Appropriations Act, 1994	Making appropriations for military construction for the Department of Defense for the fiscal year ending September 30, 1994, and for other purposes.	Pub. L. 103–110, H.R. 2446, 107 Stat. 1037
103–111	October 21, 1993	Agriculture, Rural Development, Food and Drug Administration, and Related Agencies Appropriations Act, 1994	Making appropriations for Agriculture, Rural Development, Food and Drug Administration, and Related Agencies programs for the fiscal year ending September 30, 1994, and for other purposes.	Pub. L. 103–111, H.R. 2493, 107 Stat. 1046
103–112	October 21, 1993	Departments of Labor, Health and Human Services, and Education, and Related Agencies Appropriations Act, 1994	Making appropriations for the Departments of Labor, Health and Human Services, and Education, and related agencies, for the fiscal year ending September 30, 1994, and for other purposes.	Pub. L. 103–112, H.R. 2518, 107 Stat. 1082
103–113	October 21, 1993	(No short title)	Making further continuing appropriations for the fiscal year 1994, and for other purposes.	Pub. L. 103–113, H.J.Res. 281, 107 Stat. 1114
103–114	October 26, 1993	(No short title)	To amend title 5, United States Code, to extend the Federal Physicians Comparability Allowance Act of 1978, and for other purposes.	Pub. L. 103–114, H.R. 2685, 107 Stat. 1115
103–115	October 26, 1993	(No short title)	To amend the definition of a rural community for eligibility for economic recovery funds, and for other purposes.	Pub. L. 103–115, S. 1508, 107 Stat. 1117
103–116	October 27, 1993	Catawba Indian Tribe of South Carolina land Claims Settlement Act of 1993	To provide for the settlement of land claims of the Catawba Tribe of Indians in the State of South Carolina and the restoration of the Federal trust relationship with the Tribe, and for other purposes.	Pub. L. 103–116, H.R. 2399, 107 Stat. 1118
103–117	October 27, 1993	(No short title)	Designating October 21, 1993, as "National Biomedical Research Day".	Pub. L. 103–117, H.J.Res. 111, 107 Stat. 1139
103–118	October 27, 1993	(No short title)	To designate the week beginning September 19, 1993, as "National Historically Black Colleges and Universities Week".	Pub. L. 103–118, S.J.Res. 21, 107 Stat. 1141
103–119	October 27, 1993	(No short title)	To designate the month of October 1993 as "National Down Syndrome Awareness Month".	Pub. L. 103–119, S.J.Res. 92, 107 Stat. 1142
103–120	October 27, 1993	HUD Demonstration Act of 1993	To enable the Secretary of Housing and Urban Development to demonstrate innovative strategies for assisting homeless individuals, to develop the capacity of community development corporations and community housing development organizations to undertake community development and affordable housing projects and programs, to encourage pension fund investment in affordable housing, and for other purposes.	Pub. L. 103–120, H.R. 2517, 107 Stat. 1144
103–121	October 27, 1993	Departments of Commerce, Justice, and State, the Judiciary, and Related Agencies Appropriations Act, 1994	Making appropriations for the Departments of Commerce, Justice, and State, the Judiciary, and related agencies for the fiscal year ending September 30, 1994, and for other purposes.	Pub. L. 103–121, H.R. 2519, 107 Stat. 1153
103–122	October 27, 1993	Department of Transportation and Related Agencies Appropriations Act, 1994	Making appropriations for the Department of Transportation and related agencies for the fiscal year ending September 30, 1994, and for other purposes.	Pub. L. 103–122, H.R. 2750, 107 Stat. 1198
103–123	October 28, 1993	Treasury, Postal Service and General Government Appropriations Act, 1994	Making appropriations for the Treasury Department, the United States Postal Service, the Executive Office of the President, and certain Independent Agencies, for the fiscal year ending September 30, 1994, and for other purposes.	Pub. L. 103–123, H.R. 2403, 107 Stat. 1226
103–124	October 28, 1993	Departments of Veterans Affairs and Housing and Urban Development, and Independent Agencies Appropriations Act, 1994	Making appropriations for the Departments of Veterans Affairs and Housing and Urban Development, and for sundry independent agencies, boards, commissions, corporations, and offices for the fiscal year ending September 30, 1994, and for other purposes.	Pub. L. 103–124, H.R. 2491, 107 Stat. 1275
103–125	October 28, 1993	Middle East Peace Facilitation Act of 1993	Entitled "Middle East Peace Facilitation Act of 1993".	Pub. L. 103–125, S. 1487, 107 Stat. 1309
103–126	October 28, 1993	Energy and Water Development Appropriations Act, 1994	Making appropriations for energy and water development for the fiscal year ending September 30, 1994, and for other purposes.	Pub. L. 103–126, H.R. 2445, 107 Stat. 1312
103–127	October 29, 1993	(No short title)	Making appropriations for the government of the District of Columbia and other activities chargeable in whole or in part against the revenues of said District for the fiscal year ending September 30, 1994, and for other purposes.	Pub. L. 103–127, H.R. 2492, 107 Stat. 1336
103–128	October 29, 1993	(No short title)	Making further continuing appropriations for the fiscal year 1994, and for other purposes.	Pub. L. 103–128, H.J.Res. 283, 107 Stat. 1355
103–129	November 1, 1993	Rural Electrification Loan Restructuring Act of 1993	To improve the electric and telephone loan programs carried out under the Rural Electrification Act of 1936, and for other purposes.	Pub. L. 103–129, H.R. 3123, 107 Stat. 1356
103–130	November 1, 1993	(No short title)	To amend the National Wool Act of 1954 to reduce the subsidies that wool and mohair producers receive for the 1994 and 1995 marketing years and to eliminate the wool and mohair programs for the 1996 and subsequent marketing years, and for other purposes.	Pub. L. 103–130, S. 1548, 107 Stat. 1368
103–131	November 1, 1993	(No short title)	Designating the beach at 53 degrees 53'51"N, 166 degrees 34'15"W to 53 degrees 53'48"N, 166 degrees 34'21"W on Hog Island, which lies in the Northeast Bay of Unalaska, Alaska as "Arkansas Beach" in commemoration of the 206th regiment of the National Guard, who served during the Japanese attack on Dutch Harbor, Unalaska on June 3 and 4, 1942.	Pub. L. 103–131, S.J.Res. 78, 107 Stat. 1370
103–132	November 2, 1993	(No short title)	To direct the Secretary of Agriculture to convey certain lands to the town of Taos, New Mexico.	Pub. L. 103–132, H.R. 328, 107 Stat. 1371
103–133	November 2, 1993	(No short title)	To approve the extension of nondiscriminatory treatment with respect to the products of Romania.	Pub. L. 103–133, H.J.Res. 228, 107 Stat. 1373
103–134	November 8, 1993	(No short title)	To designate the Pittsburgh Aviary in Pittsburgh, Pennsylvania as the National Aviary in Pittsburgh.	Pub. L. 103–134, H.R. 927, 107 Stat. 1374
103–135	November 8, 1993	(No short title)	To modify the project for flood control, James River Basin, Richmond, Virginia.	Pub. L. 103–135, H.R. 2824, 107 Stat. 1375
103–136	November 8, 1993	(No short title)	Designating the week beginning October 31, 1993, as "National Health Information Management Week".	Pub. L. 103–136, H.J.Res. 205, 107 Stat. 1376
103–137	November 8, 1993	(No short title)	Designating November 22, 1993, as "National Military Families Recognition Day".	Pub. L. 103–137, S.J.Res. 115, 107 Stat. 1377
103–138	November 11, 1993	Department of the Interior and Related Agencies Appropriations Act, 1994	Making appropriations for the Department of the Interior and related agencies for the fiscal year ending September 30, 1994, and for other purposes.	Pub. L. 103–138, H.R. 2520, 107 Stat. 1379
103–139	November 11, 1993	Department of Defense Appropriations Act, 1994	Making appropriations for the Department of Defense for the fiscal year ending September 30, 1994, and for other purposes.	Pub. L. 103–139, H.R. 3116, 107 Stat. 1418
103–140	November 11, 1993	Veterans' Compensation Rates Amendments of 1993	To amend title 38, United States Code, to provide a cost-of-living adjustment in the rates of disability compensation for veterans with service-connected disabilities and the rates of dependency and indemnity compensation for survivors of such veterans.	Pub. L. 103–140, S. 616, 107 Stat. 1485
103–141	November 16, 1993	Religious Freedom Restoration Act of 1993	To protect the free exercise of religion.	Pub. L. 103–141, H.R. 1308, 107 Stat. 1488
103–142	November 17, 1993	(No short title)	To amend title 18, United States Code, to authorize the Federal Bureau of Investigation to obtain certain telephone subscriber information.	Pub. L. 103–142, H.R. 175, 107 Stat. 1491
103–143	November 17, 1993	(No short title)	To designate the Federal building located at 280 South First Street in San Jose, California, as the "Robert F. Peckham United States Courthouse and the Federal Building".	Pub. L. 103–143, H.R. 1345, 107 Stat. 1493
103–144	November 17, 1993	El Camino Real de Tierra Adentro Study Act of 1993	To amend the National Trails System Act to provide for a study of El Camino Real de Tierra Adentro (The Royal Road of the Interior Lands), and for other purposes.	Pub. L. 103–144, S. 836, 107 Stat. 1494
103–145	November 17, 1993	El Camino Real Para Los Texas Study Act of 1993	To amend the National Trails System Act to direct the Secretary of the Interior to study the El Camino Real Para Los Texas for potential addition to the National Trails System, and for other purposes.	Pub. L. 103–145, S. 983, 107 Stat. 1496
103–146	November 17, 1993	(No short title)	Designating the week beginning November 14, 1993, and the week beginning November 13, 1994, each as "Geography Awareness Week".	Pub. L. 103–146, S.J.Res. 131, 107 Stat. 1498
103–147	November 17, 1993	(No short title)	To designate the third Sunday in November 1993 as "National Children's Day".	Pub. L. 103–147, S.J.Res. 139, 107 Stat. 1500
103–148	November 17, 1993	(No short title)	Designating the week beginning November 7, 1993, as "National Women Veterans Recognition Week".	Pub. L. 103–148, S.J.Res. 142, 107 Stat. 1502
103–149	November 23, 1993	South African Democratic Transition Support Act of 1993	To support the transition to nonracial democracy in South Africa.	Pub. L. 103–149, H.R. 3225, 107 Stat. 1503
103–150	November 23, 1993	(No short title)	To acknowledge the 100th anniversary of the January 17, 1893 overthrow of the Kingdom of Hawaii, and to offer an apology to Native Hawaiians on behalf of the United States for the overthrow of the Kingdom of Hawaii.	Pub. L. 103–150, S.J.Res. 19, 107 Stat. 1510
103–151	November 24, 1993	(No short title)	To authorize the Board of Regents of the Smithsonian Institution to plan, design, and construct the West Court of the National Museum of Natural History building.	Pub. L. 103–151, H.R. 2677, 107 Stat. 1515
103–152	November 24, 1993	Unemployment Compensation Amendments of 1993	To extend the emergency unemployment compensation program, to establish a system of worker profiling, and for other purposes.	Pub. L. 103–152, H.R. 3167, 107 Stat. 1516
103–153	November 24, 1993	(No short title)	To authorize the President to issue a proclamation designating the week beginning on November 21, 1993, and November 20, 1994, as "National Family Week".	Pub. L. 103–153, H.J.Res. 79, 107 Stat. 1521
103–154	November 24, 1993	(No short title)	To designate the month of November in 1993 and 1994 as "National Hospice Month".	Pub. L. 103–154, H.J.Res. 159, 107 Stat. 1522
103–155	November 24, 1993	(No short title)	To amend the Indian Environmental General Assistance Program Act of 1992 to extend the authorization of appropriations.	Pub. L. 103–155, S. 654, 107 Stat. 1523
103–156	November 24, 1993	United States Grain Standards Act Amendments of 1993	To amend the United States Grain Standards Act to extend the authority of the Federal Grain Inspection Service to collect fees to cover administrative and supervisory costs, to extend the authorization of appropriations for such Act, and to improve administration of such Act, and for other purposes.	Pub. L. 103–156, S. 1490, 107 Stat. 1525
103–157	November 24, 1993	(No short title)	To designate the periods commencing on November 28, 1993, and ending on December 4, 1993, and commencing on November 27, 1994, and ending on December 3, 1994, as "National Home Care Week".	Pub. L. 103–157, S.J.Res. 55, 107 Stat. 1532
103–158	November 24, 1993	(No short title)	To authorize the placement of a memorial cairn in Arlington National Cemetery, Arlington, Virginia, to honor the 270 victims of the terrorist bombing of Pan Am Flight 103.	Pub. L. 103–158, S.J.Res. 129, 107 Stat. 1533
103–159	November 30, 1993	(No short title)	To provide for a waiting period before the purchase of a handgun, and for the establishment of a national instant criminal background check system to be contacted by firearms dealers before the transfer of any firearm.	Pub. L. 103–159, H.R. 1025, 107 Stat. 1536
103–160	November 30, 1993	National Defense Authorization Act for Fiscal Year 1994	To authorize appropriations for fiscal year 1994 for military activities of the Department of Defense, for military construction, and for defense activities of the Department of Energy, to prescribe personnel strengths for such fiscal year for the Armed Forces, and for other purposes.	Pub. L. 103–160, H.R. 2401, 107 Stat. 1547
103–161	November 30, 1993	(No short title)	To amend title 38, United States Code, to increase the rate of special pension payable to persons who have received the Congressional Medal of Honor.	Pub. L. 103–161, H.R. 3341, 107 Stat. 1967
103–162	December 1, 1993	(No short title)	To designate portions of the Maurice River and its tributaries in the State of New Jersey as components of the National Wild and Scenic Rivers System.	Pub. L. 103–162, H.R. 2650, 107 Stat. 1968
103–163	December 2, 1993	(No short title)	To authorize the Air Force Memorial Foundation to establish a memorial in the District of Columbia or its environs.	Pub. L. 103–163, H.R. 898, 107 Stat. 1973
103–164	December 2, 1993	(No short title)	Designating January 16, 1994, as "National Good Teen Day".	Pub. L. 103–164, H.J.Res. 75, 107 Stat. 1974
103–165	December 2, 1993	(No short title)	To express appreciation to W. Graham Claytor, Jr., for a lifetime of dedicated and inspired service to the Nation.	Pub. L. 103–165, H.J.Res. 294, 107 Stat. 1975
103–166	December 2, 1993	(No short title)	To extend authorities under the Middle East Peace Facilitation Act of 1993 by six months.	Pub. L. 103–166, S. 1667, 107 Stat. 1978
103–167	December 2, 1993	(No short title)	Designating January 2, 1994, through January 8, 1994, as "National Law Enforcement Training Week".	Pub. L. 103–167, S.J.Res. 75, 107 Stat. 1979
103–168	December 2, 1993	(No short title)	Designating December 1993 as "National Drunk and Drugged Driving Prevention Month".	Pub. L. 103–168, S.J.Res. 122, 107 Stat. 1981
103–169	December 2, 1993	Lechuguilla Cave Protection Act of 1993	To protect Lechuguilla Cave and other resources and values in and adjacent to Carlsbad Caverns National Park.	Pub. L. 103–169, H.R. 698, 107 Stat. 1983
103–170	December 2, 1993	Red River Designation Act of 1993	To amend the Wild and Scenic Rivers Act to designate certain segments of the Red River in Kentucky as components of the national wild and scenic rivers system, and for other purposes.	Pub. L. 103–170, H.R. 914, 107 Stat. 1986
103–171	December 2, 1993	Older Americans Act Technical Amendments of 1993	To make technical amendments necessitated by the enactment of the Older Americans Act Amendments of 1992, and for other purposes.	Pub. L. 103–171, H.R. 3161, 107 Stat. 1988
103–172	December 2, 1993	Federal Employees Clean Air Incentives Act	To amend title 5, United States Code, to provide for the establishment of programs to encourage Federal employees to commute by means other than single-occupancy motor vehicles.	Pub. L. 103–172, H.R. 3318, 107 Stat. 1995
103–173	December 2, 1993	International Parental Kidnapping Crime Act of 1993	To amend title 18, United States Code, with respect to parental kidnapping, and for other purposes.	Pub. L. 103–173, H.R. 3378, 107 Stat. 1998
103–174	December 2, 1993	(No short title)	To authorize the leasing of naval vessels to certain foreign countries.	Pub. L. 103–174, H.R. 3471, 107 Stat. 2000
103–175	December 2, 1993	(No short title)	To authorize and direct the Secretary of the Interior to convey certain lands in Cameron Parish, Louisiana, and for other purposes.	Pub. L. 103–175, S. 433, 107 Stat. 2002
103–176	December 3, 1993	Indian Tribal Justice Act	To assist the development of tribal judicial systems, and for other purposes.	Pub. L. 103–176, H.R. 1268, 107 Stat. 2004
103–177	December 3, 1993	American Indian Agricultural Resource Management Act	To improve the management, productivity, and use of Indian agricultural lands and resources.	Pub. L. 103–177, H.R. 1425, 107 Stat. 2011
103–178	December 3, 1993	Intelligence Authorization Act for Fiscal Year 1994	To authorize appropriations for fiscal year 1994 for the intelligence and intelligence-related activities of the United States Government, the Community Management Account, and the Central Intelligence Agency Retirement and Disability System, and for other purposes.	Pub. L. 103–178, H.R. 2330, 107 Stat. 2024
103–179	December 3, 1993	Patent and Trademark Office Authorization Act of 1993	To authorize appropriations for the Patent and Trademark Office in the Department of Commerce for fiscal year 1994, and for other purposes.	Pub. L. 103–179, H.R. 2632, 107 Stat. 2040
103–180	December 3, 1993	Negotiated Rates Act of 1993	To amend title 49, United States Code, relating to procedures for resolving claims involving unfiled, negotiated transportation rates, and for other purposes.	Pub. L. 103–180, S. 412, 107 Stat. 2044
103–181	December 3, 1993	Hazard Mitigation and Relocation Assistance Act of 1993	To improve hazard mitigation and relocation assistance in connection with flooding, and for other purposes.	Pub. L. 103–181, S. 1670, 107 Stat. 2054
103–182	December 8, 1993	North American Free Trade Agreement Implementation Act	To implement the North American Free Trade Agreement.	Pub. L. 103–182, H.R. 3450, 107 Stat. 2057
103–183	December 14, 1993	Preventive Health Amendments of 1993	To amend the Public Health Service Act to revise and extend the program of grants relating to preventive health measures with respect to breast and cervical cancer.	Pub. L. 103–183, H.R. 2202, 107 Stat. 2226
103–184	December 14, 1993	(No short title)	To provide for the addition of the Truman Farm Home to the Harry S. Truman National Historic Site in the State of Missouri.	Pub. L. 103–184, H.R. 486, 107 Stat. 2243
103–185	December 14, 1993	(No short title)	To provide increased flexibility to States in carrying out the Low-Income Home Energy Assistance Program.	Pub. L. 103–185, H.R. 3321, 107 Stat. 2244
103–186	December 14, 1993	(No short title)	To require the Secretary of the Treasury to mint coins in commemoration of the 250th anniversary of the birth of Thomas Jefferson, Americans who have been prisoners of war, the Vietnam Veterans Memorial on the occasion of the 10th anniversary of the Memorial, and the Women in Military Service for America Memorial, and for other purposes.	Pub. L. 103–186, H.R. 3616, 107 Stat. 2245
103–187	December 14, 1993	(No short title)	Designating October 29, 1993, as "National Firefighters Day".	Pub. L. 103–187, H.J.Res. 272, 107 Stat. 2255
103–188	December 14, 1993	Egg Research and Consumer Information Act Amendments of 1993	To amend the Egg Research and Consumer Information Act to modify the provisions governing the rate of assessment, to expand the exemption of egg producers from such Act, and for other purposes.	Pub. L. 103–188, S. 717, 107 Stat. 2256
103–189	December 14, 1993	Watermelon Research and Promotion Improvement Act of 1993	To amend the Watermelon Research and Promotion Act to expand operation of the Act to the entire United States, to authorize the revocation of the refund provision of the Act, to modify the referendum procedures of the Act, and for other purposes.	Pub. L. 103–189, S. 778, 107 Stat. 2259
103–190	December 14, 1993	Fresh Cut Flowers and Fresh Cut Greens Promotion and Information Act of 1993	To authorize the establishment of a fresh cut flowers and fresh cut greens promotion and consumer information program for the benefit of the floricultural industry and other persons, and for other purposes.	Pub. L. 103–190, S. 994, 107 Stat. 2266
103–191	December 14, 1993	(No short title)	To amend the Thomas Jefferson Commemoration Commission Act to extend the deadlines for reports.	Pub. L. 103–191, S. 1716, 107 Stat. 2291
103–192	December 14, 1993	(No short title)	To extend arbitration under the provisions of chapter 44 of title 28, United States Code, and for other purposes.	Pub. L. 103–192, S. 1732, 107 Stat. 2292
103–193	December 14, 1993	(No short title)	To provide for the extension of certain authority for the Marshal of the Supreme Court and the Supreme Court Police.	Pub. L. 103–193, S. 1764, 107 Stat. 2293
103–194	December 14, 1993	Lime Research, Promotion, and Consumer Information Improvement Act	To amend the Lime Research, Promotion, and Consumer Information Act of 1990 to cover seedless and not seeded limes, to increase the exemption level, to delay the initial referendum date, and to alter the composition of the Lime Board, and for other purposes.	Pub. L. 103–194, S. 1766, 107 Stat. 2294
103–195	December 14, 1993	(No short title)	To make a technical correction, and for other purposes.	Pub. L. 103–195, S. 1769, 107 Stat. 2297
103–196	December 14, 1993	(No short title)	Designating January 16, 1994, as "Religious Freedom Day".	Pub. L. 103–196, S.J.Res. 154, 107 Stat. 2299
103–197	December 17, 1993	(No short title)	To provide for additional development at War in the Pacific National Historical Park, and for other purposes.	Pub. L. 103–197, H.R. 1944, 107 Stat. 2301
103–198	December 17, 1993	Copyright Royalty Tribunal Reform Act of 1993	To amend title 17, United States Code, to establish copyright arbitration royalty panels to replace the Copyright Royalty Tribunal, and for other purposes.	Pub. L. 103–198, H.R. 2840, 107 Stat. 2304
103–199	December 17, 1993	FRIENDSHIP Act of 1993	For reform in emerging new democracies and support and help for improved partnership with Russia, Ukraine, and other new independent states of the former Soviet Union.	Pub. L. 103–199, H.R. 3000, 107 Stat. 2317
103–200	December 17, 1993	Domestic Chemical Diversion Control Act of 1993	To amend the Comprehensive Drug Abuse Prevention and Control Act of 1970 to control the diversion of certain chemicals used in the illicit production of controlled substances such as methcathinone and methamphetamine, and for other purposes.	Pub. L. 103–200, H.R. 3216, 107 Stat. 2333
103–201	December 17, 1993	(No short title)	To clarify the regulatory oversight exercised by the Rural Electrification Administration with respect to certain electric borrowers.	Pub. L. 103–201, H.R. 3514, 107 Stat. 2342
103–202	December 17, 1993	Government Securities Act Amendments of 1993	To extend and revise rulemaking authority with respect to government securities under the Federal securities laws, and for other purposes.	Pub. L. 103–202, S. 422, 107 Stat. 2344
103–203	December 17, 1993	(No short title)	Making a technical amendment of the Clayton Act.	Pub. L. 103–203, S. 664, 107 Stat. 2368
103–204	December 17, 1993	Resolution Trust Corporation Completion Act	To provide for the remaining funds needed to assure that the United States fulfills its obligation for the protection of depositors at savings and loan institutions, to improve the management of the Resolution Trust Corporation (RTC) in order to assure the taxpayers the fairest and most efficient disposition of savings and loan assets, to provide for a comprehensive transition plan to assure an orderly transfer of RTC resources to the Federal Deposit Insurance Corporation, to abolish the RTC, and for other purposes.	Pub. L. 103–204, S. 714, 107 Stat. 2369
103–205	December 17, 1993	(No short title)	To extend the suspended implementation of certain requirements of the food stamp program on Indian reservations, to suspend certain eligibility requirements for the participation of retail food stores in the food stamp program, and for other purposes.	Pub. L. 103–205, S. 1777, 107 Stat. 2418
103–206	December 20, 1993	Coast Guard Authorization Act of 1993	To authorize appropriations for fiscal year 1994 for the United States Coast Guard, and for other purposes.	Pub. L. 103–206, H.R. 2150, 107 Stat. 2419
103–207	December 20, 1993	(No short title)	Providing for the convening of the Second Session of the One Hundred Third Congress.	Pub. L. 103–207, H.J.Res. 300, 107 Stat. 2456
103–208	December 20, 1993	Higher Education Technical Amendments of 1993	To make certain technical and conforming amendments to the Higher Education Act of 1965.	Pub. L. 103–208, S. 1507, 107 Stat. 2457
103–209	December 20, 1993	National Child Protection Act of 1993	To establish procedures for national criminal background checks for child care providers.	Pub. L. 103–209, H.R. 1237, 107 Stat. 2490
103–210	December 20, 1993	(No short title)	To amend title 38, United States Code, to provide additional authority for the Secretary of Veterans Affairs to provide health care for veterans of the Persian Gulf War.	Pub. L. 103–210, H.R. 2535, 107 Stat. 2496
103–211	February 12, 1994	Emergency Supplemental Appropriations Act of 1994	Making emergency supplemental appropriations for the fiscal year ending September 30, 1994, and for other purposes.	Pub. L. 103–211, H.R. 3759, 108 Stat. 3
103–212	February 16, 1994	(No short title)	To designate the Federal Building and United States Courthouse located at 402 East State Street in Trenton, New Jersey, as the "Clarkson S. Fisher Federal Building and United States Courthouse".	Pub. L. 103–212, H.R. 1303, 108 Stat. 43
103–213	February 16, 1994	(No short title)	To designate the Federal building located at 525 Griffin Street in Dallas, Texas, as the "A. Maceo Smith Federal Building".	Pub. L. 103–213, H.R. 2223, 108 Stat. 44
103–214	February 16, 1994	(No short title)	To designate the Federal building located at 100 East Fifth Street in Cincinnati, Ohio, as the "Potter Stewart United States Courthouse".	Pub. L. 103–214, H.R. 2555, 108 Stat. 45
103–215	February 16, 1994	(No short title)	To designate the United States Courthouse located in Houma, Louisiana, as the "George Arceneaux, Jr., United States Courthouse".	Pub. L. 103–215, H.R. 3186, 108 Stat. 46
103–216	February 16, 1994	(No short title)	To designate the United States courthouse under construction at 611 Broad Street, in Lake Charles, Louisiana, as the "Edwin Ford Hunter, Jr., United States Courthouse".	Pub. L. 103–216, H.R. 3356, 108 Stat. 47
103–217	February 22, 1994	(No short title)	To designate the month of March 1994 as "Irish-American Heritage Month".	Pub. L. 103–217, S.J.Res. 119, 108 Stat. 48
103–218	March 9, 1994	Technology-Related Assistance for Individuals with Disabilities Act Amendments of 1994	To revise and extend the programs of the Technology-Related Assistance for Individuals With Disabilities Act of 1988, and for other purposes.	Pub. L. 103–218, H.R. 2339, 108 Stat. 50
103–219	March 9, 1994	(No short title)	To amend the Everglades National Park Protection and Expansion Act of 1989, and for other purposes.	Pub. L. 103–219, H.R. 3617, 108 Stat. 98
103–220	March 17, 1994	(No short title)	To amend title 23, United States Code, to permit the use of funds under the highway bridge replacement and rehabilitation program for seismic retrofit of bridges, and for other purposes.	Pub. L. 103–220, S. 1789, 108 Stat. 100
103–221	March 24, 1994	(No short title)	To designate the week beginning April 12, 1993, as "National Public Safety Telecommunicators Week".	Pub. L. 103–221, S.J.Res. 56, 108 Stat. 101
103–222	March 24, 1994	(No short title)	Designating March 25, 1994, as "Greek Independence Day: A National Day of Celebration of Greek and American Democracy".	Pub. L. 103–222, S.J.Res. 162, 108 Stat. 102
103–223	March 24, 1994	(No short title)	To proclaim March 20, 1994, as "National Agriculture Day".	Pub. L. 103–223, S.J.Res. 163, 108 Stat. 103
103–224	March 24, 1994	(No short title)	To designate March 20 through March 26, 1994, as "Small Family Farm Week".	Pub. L. 103–224, S.J.Res. 171, 108 Stat. 105
103–225	March 25, 1994	Food Stamp Program Improvements Act of 1994	To amend the Food Stamp Act of 1977 to modify the requirements relating to monthly reporting and staggered issuance of coupons for households residing on Indian reservations, to ensure adequate access to retail food stores by food stamp households, and to maintain the integrity of the food stamp program, and for other purposes.	Pub. L. 103–225, S. 1926, 108 Stat. 106
103–226	March 30, 1994	Federal Workforce Restructuring Act of 1994	To provide temporary authority to Government agencies relating to voluntary separation incentive payments, and for other purposes.	Pub. L. 103–226, H.R. 3345, 108 Stat. 111
103–227	March 31, 1994	Goals 2000: Educate America Act	To improve learning and teaching by providing a national framework for education reform; to promote the research, consensus building, and systemic changes needed to ensure equitable educational opportunities and high levels of educational achievement for all students; to provide a framework for reauthorization of all Federal education programs; to promote the development and adoption of a voluntary national system of skill standards and certifications; and for other purposes.	Pub. L. 103–227, H.R. 1804, 108 Stat. 125
103–228	March 31, 1994	(No short title)	To temporarily extend certain provisions of the Marine Mammal Protection Act.	Pub. L. 103–228, H.R. 4122, 108 Stat. 281
103–229	April 6, 1994	(No short title)	Designating March 23, 1994, as "Education and Sharing Day, U.S.A.".	Pub. L. 103–229, H.J.Res. 329, 108 Stat. 282
103–230	April 6, 1994	Developmental Disabilities Assistance and Bill of Rights Act Amendments of 1994	To amend the Developmental Disabilities Assistance Bill of Rights Act to expand or modify certain provisions relating to programs for certain individuals with developmental disabilities, Federal assistance for priority area activities for individuals with developmental disabilities, protection and advocacy of individual rights, university affiliated programs, and projects of national significance, and for other purposes.	Pub. L. 103–230, S. 1284, 108 Stat. 284
103–231	April 6, 1994	(No short title)	To extend certain compliance dates for pesticide safety training and labeling requirements.	Pub. L. 103–231, S. 1913, 108 Stat. 333
103–232	April 11, 1994	National Fish and Wildlife Foundation Improvement Act of 1994	To reauthorize and amend the National Fish and Wildlife Foundation Establishment Act, and for other purposes.	Pub. L. 103–232, S. 476, 108 Stat. 336
103–233	April 11, 1994	Multifamily Housing Property Disposition Reform Act of 1994	To amend section 203 of the Housing and Community Development Amendments of 1978 to provide for the disposition of multifamily properties owned by the Secretary of Housing and Urban Development, to provide for other reforms in programs administered by the Secretary, and to make certain technical amendments, and for other purposes.	Pub. L. 103–233, S. 1299, 108 Stat. 342
103–234	April 14, 1994	(No short title)	To redesignate the Federal building located at 380 Trapelo Road in Waltham, Massachusetts, as the "Frederick C. Murphy Federal Center".	Pub. L. 103–234, S. 1206, 108 Stat. 380
103–235	April 28, 1994	(No short title)	To extend until July 1, 1998, the exemption from ineligibility based on a high default rate for certain institutions of higher education.	Pub. L. 103–235, S. 2004, 108 Stat. 381
103–236	April 30, 1994	Foreign Relations Authorization Act, Fiscal Years 1994 and 1995	To authorize appropriations for the Department of State, the United States Information Agency, and related agencies, and for other purposes.	Pub. L. 103–236, H.R. 2333, 108 Stat. 382
103–237	April 30, 1994	(No short title)	To suspend temporarily the duty on the personal effects of participants in, and certain other individuals associated with, the 1994 World Cup Soccer Games, the 1994 World Rowing Championships, the 1995 Special Olympics World Games, the 1996 Summer Olympics, and the 1996 Paralympics.	Pub. L. 103–237, H.R. 4066, 108 Stat. 530
103–238	April 30, 1994	Marine Mammal Protection Act Amendments of 1994	To authorize appropriations for the Marine Mammal Protection Act of 1972 and to improve the program to reduce the incidental taking of marine mammals during the course of commercial fishing operations, and for other purposes.	Pub. L. 103–238, S. 1636, 108 Stat. 532
103–239	May 4, 1994	School-to-Work Opportunities Act of 1994	To establish a national framework for the development of School-to-Work Opportunities systems in all States, and for other purposes.	Pub. L. 103–239, H.R. 2884, 108 Stat. 568
103–240	May 4, 1994	(No short title)	To amend title 38, United States Code, to extend eligibility for burial in national cemeteries to persons who have 20 years of service creditable for retired pay as members of a reserve component of the Armed Forces.	Pub. L. 103–240, H.R. 821, 108 Stat. 609
103–241	May 4, 1994	(No short title)	To designate the United States courthouse under construction in Denver, Colorado, as the "Byron White United States Courthouse".	Pub. L. 103–241, H.R. 3693, 108 Stat. 610
103–242	May 4, 1994	Rio Grande Designation Act of 1994	To amend the Wild and Scenic Rivers Act by designating a segment of the Rio Grande in New Mexico as a component of the National Wild and Scenic Rivers System, and for other purposes.	Pub. L. 103–242, S. 375, 108 Stat. 611
103–243	May 4, 1994	(No short title)	To authorize appropriations for the Coastal Heritage Trail Route in the State of New Jersey, and for other purposes.	Pub. L. 103–243, S. 1574, 108 Stat. 613
103–244	May 4, 1994	(No short title)	Providing for the appointment of Frank Anderson Shrontz as a citizen regent of the Board of Regents of the Smithsonian Institution.	Pub. L. 103–244, S.J.Res. 143, 108 Stat. 614
103–245	May 4, 1994	(No short title)	Providing for the appointment of Manuel Luis Ibanez as a citizen regent of the Board of Regents of the Smithsonian Institution.	Pub. L. 103–245, S.J.Res. 144, 108 Stat. 615
103–246	May 4, 1994	(No short title)	To designate the week of May 2 through May 8, 1994, as "Public Service Recognition Week".	Pub. L. 103–246, S.J.Res. 150, 108 Stat. 616
103–247	May 6, 1994	(No short title)	To make certain technical corrections, and for other purposes.	Pub. L. 103–247, S. 2005, 108 Stat. 618
103–248	May 11, 1994	Farmers Home Administration Improvement Act of 1994	To amend the Consolidated Farm and Rural Development Act to improve the administration of claims and obligations of the Farmers Home Administration, and for other purposes.	Pub. L. 103–248, S. 1930, 108 Stat. 619
103–249	May 16, 1994	(No short title)	To designate the Federal building located at 711 Washington Street in Boston, Massachusetts, as the "Jean Mayer Human Nutrition Research Center on Aging".	Pub. L. 103–249, H.R. 4204, 108 Stat. 620
103–250	May 16, 1994	(No short title)	To authorize the President to proclaim September 1994 as "Classical Music Month".	Pub. L. 103–250, H.J.Res. 239, 108 Stat. 621
103–251	May 16, 1994	(No short title)	Designating May 1, 1994, through May 7, 1994, as "National Walking Week".	Pub. L. 103–251, S.J.Res. 146, 108 Stat. 622
103–252	May 18, 1994	Human Services Amendments of 1994	To authorize appropriations to carry out the Head Start Act, the Community Services Block Grant Act, and the Low-Income Home Energy Assistance Act of 1981, and for other purposes.	Pub. L. 103–252, S. 2000, 108 Stat. 623
103–253	May 19, 1994	Clear Creek County, Colorado, Public Lands Transfer Act of 1993	To provide for the transfer of certain public lands located in Clear Creek County, Colorado, to the Forest Service, the State of Colorado, and certain local governments in the State of Colorado, and for other purposes.	Pub. L. 103–253, H.R. 1134, 108 Stat. 674
103–254	May 19, 1994	Arson Prevention Act of 1994	To establish a program of grants to states for arson research, prevention, and control, and for other purposes.	Pub. L. 103–254, H.R. 1727, 108 Stat. 679
103–255	May 19, 1994	(No short title)	To provide for a land exchange between the Secretary of Agriculture and Eagle and Pitkin Counties in Colorado, and for other purposes.	Pub. L. 103–255, S. 341, 108 Stat. 684
103–256	May 25, 1994	(No short title)	To designate the Federal building located at 600 Camp Street in New Orleans, Louisiana, as the 'John Minor Wisdom United States Court of Appeals Building', and for other purposes.	Pub. L. 103–256, H.R. 2868, 108 Stat. 690
103–257	May 25, 1994	(No short title)	Designating June 6, 1994, as "D-Day National Remembrance Day".	Pub. L. 103–257, H.J.Res. 303, 108 Stat. 691
103–258	May 25, 1994	(No short title)	Designating May 11, 1994, as "Vietnam Human Rights Day".	Pub. L. 103–258, S.J.Res. 168, 108 Stat. 692
103–259	May 26, 1994	Freedom of Access to Clinic Entrances Act of 1994	To amend title 18, United States Code, to assure freedom of access to reproductive services.	Pub. L. 103–259, S. 636, 108 Stat. 694
103–260	May 26, 1994	Airport Improvement Program Temporary Extension Act of 1994	To provide temporary obligational authority for the airport improvement program and to provide for certain airport fees to be maintained at existing levels for up to 60 days, and for other purposes.	Pub. L. 103–260, S. 2024, 108 Stat. 698
103–261	May 26, 1994	(No short title)	To extend the time period for compliance with the Nutrition Labeling and Education Act of 1990 for certain food products packaged prior to August 8, 1994.	Pub. L. 103–261, S. 2087, 108 Stat. 705
103–262	May 31, 1994	(No short title)	To authorize appropriations for the National Historical Publications and Records Commission for fiscal years 1994, 1995, 1996, and 1997.	Pub. L. 103–262, H.R. 2139, 108 Stat. 706
103–263	May 31, 1994	(No short title)	To make certain technical corrections.	Pub. L. 103–263, S. 1654, 108 Stat. 707
103–264	May 31, 1994	(No short title)	To designate the week of June 12 through 19, 1994, as "National Men's Health Week".	Pub. L. 103–264, S.J.Res. 179, 108 Stat. 710
103–265	June 10, 1994	(No short title)	To designate the Post Office building located at 401 E. South Street in Jackson, Mississippi, as the "Medgar Wiley Evers Post Office".	Pub. L. 103–265, H.R. 3863, 108 Stat. 712
103–266	June 13, 1994	(No short title)	To amend title 11, District of Columbia Code, to remove gender-specific references.	Pub. L. 103–266, H.R. 1632, 108 Stat. 713
103–267	June 16, 1994	Child Safety Protection Act	To provide for toy safety and for other purposes.	Pub. L. 103–267, H.R. 965, 108 Stat. 722
103–268	June 28, 1994	(No short title)	To amend the District of Columbia Spouse Equity Act of 1988 to provide for coverage of the former spouses of judges of the District of Columbia courts.	Pub. L. 103–268, H.R. 3676, 108 Stat. 730
103–269	June 28, 1994	(No short title)	To amend title 11, D.C. Code, to clarify that blind individuals are eligible to serve as jurors in the Superior Court of the District of Columbia.	Pub. L. 103–269, H.R. 4205, 108 Stat. 731
103–270	June 30, 1994	Independent Counsel Reauthorization Act of 1994	To reauthorize the independent counsel law for an additional 5 years, and for other purposes.	Pub. L. 103–270, S. 24, 108 Stat. 732
103–271	July 1, 1994	Board of Veterans' Appeals Administrative Procedures Improvement Act of 1994	To amend title 38, United States Code, to improve the organization and procedures of the Board of Veterans’ Appeals.	Pub. L. 103–271, S. 1904, 108 Stat. 740
103–272	July 5, 1994	(No short title)	To revise, codify, and enact without substantive change certain general and permanent laws, related to transportation, as subtitles II, III, and V-X of title 49, United States Code, "Transportation", and to make other technical improvements in the Code.	Pub. L. 103–272, H.R. 1758, 108 Stat. 745
103–273	July 5, 1994	(No short title)	To designate the Federal building located at 601 East 12th Street in Kansas City, Missouri, as the "Richard Bolling Federal Building and the United States Courthouse" located at Ninth and Locust Streets, in Kansas City, Missouri, as the "Charles Evans Whittaker United States Courthouse".	Pub. L. 103–273, H.R. 2559, 108 Stat. 1402
103–274	July 5, 1994	(No short title)	To designate the United States courthouse located in Bridgeport, Connecticut, as the "Brien McMahon Federal Building".	Pub. L. 103–274, H.R. 3724, 108 Stat. 1403
103–275	July 5, 1994	(No short title)	Making supplemental appropriations for the Department of Housing and Urban Development for the fiscal year ending September 30, 1994, and for other purposes.	Pub. L. 103–275, H.R. 4568, 108 Stat. 1404
103–276	July 5, 1994	(No short title)	To provide for the imposition of temporary fees in connection with the handling of complaints of violations of the Perishable Agriculture Commodities Act, 1930.	Pub. L. 103–276, H.R. 4581, 108 Stat. 1406
103–277	July 5, 1994	(No short title)	To extend the Export Administration Act of 1979.	Pub. L. 103–277, H.R. 4635, 108 Stat. 1407
103–278	July 20, 1994	(No short title)	Designating July 16 through July 24, 1994, as "National Apollo Anniversary Observance".	Pub. L. 103–278, S.J.Res. 187, 108 Stat. 1408
103–279	July 21, 1994	John F. Kennedy Center Act Amendments of 1994	To amend the John F. Kennedy Center Act to transfer operating responsibilities to the Board of Trustees of the John F. Kennedy Center for the Performing Arts, and for other purposes.	Pub. L. 103–279, H.R. 3567, 108 Stat. 1409
103–280	July 22, 1994	(No short title)	To remove certain restrictions from a parcel of land owned by the City of North Charleston, South Carolina, in order to permit a land exchange, and for other purposes.	Pub. L. 103–280, S. 273, 108 Stat. 1418
103–281	July 22, 1994	Twin Falls County Landfill Act of 1994	To convey a certain parcel of public land to the County of Twin Falls, Idaho, for use as a landfill, and for other purposes.	Pub. L. 103–281, S. 1402, 108 Stat. 1420
103–282	July 22, 1994	(No short title)	To amend the Small Business Act to increase the authorization for the development company program, and for other purposes.	Pub. L. 103–282, H.R. 4322, 108 Stat. 1422
103–283	July 22, 1994	Legislative Branch Appropriations Act, 1995	Making appropriations for the Legislative Branch for the fiscal year ending September 30, 1995, and for other purposes.	Pub. L. 103–283, H.R. 4454, 108 Stat. 1423
103–284	August 1, 1994	(No short title)	To designate the plaza to be constructed on the Federal Triangle property in Washington, D.C., as the "Woodrow Wilson Plaza".	Pub. L. 103–284, S. 832, 108 Stat. 1448
103–285	August 1, 1994	(No short title)	To redesignate the Federal building located on St. Croix, Virgin Islands, as the "Almeric L. Christian Federal Building".	Pub. L. 103–285, H.R. 1346, 108 Stat. 1449
103–286	August 1, 1994	(No short title)	To require certain payments made to victims of Nazi persecution to be disregarded in determining eligibility for and the amount of benefits or services based on need.	Pub. L. 103–286, H.R. 1873, 108 Stat. 1450
103–287	August 1, 1994	(No short title)	To designate the Federal building and United States courthouse in Lubbock, Texas, as the "George H. Mahon Federal Building and United States Courthouse".	Pub. L. 103–287, H.R. 2532, 108 Stat. 1453
103–288	August 1, 1994	(No short title)	To designate the United States courthouse located at 940 Front Street in San Diego, California, and the Federal building attached to the courthouse as the "Edward J. Schwartz Courthouse and Federal Building".	Pub. L. 103–288, H.R. 3770, 108 Stat. 1454
103–289	August 1, 1994	(No short title)	To designate the Federal building and United States courthouse located at 100 East Houston Street in Marshall, Texas, as the "Sam B. Hall, Jr. Federal Building and United States Courthouse".	Pub. L. 103–289, H.R. 3840, 108 Stat. 1455
103–290	August 1, 1994	(No short title)	To provide that the National Education Commission on Time and Learning shall terminate on September 30, 1994.	Pub. L. 103–290, S. 1880, 108 Stat. 1456
103–291	August 1, 1994	(No short title)	Designating May 29, 1995, through June 6, 1995, as a "Time for the National Observance of the Fiftieth anniversary of World War II".	Pub. L. 103–291, S.J.Res. 172, 108 Stat. 1457
103–292	August 11, 1994	Winter Run Chinook Salmon Captive Broodstock Act of 1993	To direct the Secretary of the Interior to conduct a salmon captive broodstock program.	Pub. L. 103–292, H.R. 2457, 108 Stat. 1458
103–293	August 11, 1994	(No short title)	Designating August 2, 1994, as "National Neighborhood Crime Watch Day".	Pub. L. 103–293, H.J.Res. 374, 108 Stat. 1459
103–294	August 11, 1994	(No short title)	To designate August 1, 1994, as "Helsinki Human Rights Day".	Pub. L. 103–294, S.J.Res. 195, 108 Stat. 1460
103–295	August 12, 1994	(No short title)	To authorize the transfer of naval vessels to certain foreign countries.	Pub. L. 103–295, H.R. 4429, 108 Stat. 1462
103–296	August 15, 1994	Social Security Independence and Program Improvements Act of 1994	To establish the Social Security Administration as an independent agency and to make other improvements in the old-age, survivors, and disability insurance program.	Pub. L. 103–296, H.R. 4277, 108 Stat. 1464
103–297	August 16, 1994	Telemarketing and Consumer Fraud and Abuse Prevention Act	To strengthen the authority of the Federal Trade Commission to protect consumers in connection with sales made with a telephone, and for other purposes.	Pub. L. 103–297, H.R. 868, 108 Stat. 1545
103–298	August 17, 1994	General Aviation Revitalization Act of 1994	To amend the Federal Aviation Act of 1958 to establish time limitations on certain civil actions against aircraft manufacturers, and for other purposes.	Pub. L. 103–298, S. 1458, 108 Stat. 1552
103–299	August 18, 1994	(No short title)	Recognizing the American Academy in Rome, an American overseas center for independent study and advanced research, on the occasion of the 100th anniversary of its founding.	Pub. L. 103–299, S.J.Res. 204, 108 Stat. 1555
103–300	August 19, 1994	(No short title)	To designate the United States courthouse under construction in St. Louis, Missouri, as the "Thomas F. Eagleton United States Courthouse".	Pub. L. 103–300, H.R. 4790, 108 Stat. 1557
103–301	August 19, 1994	(No short title)	To proclaim the week of October 16 through October 22, 1994 as "National Character Counts Week".	Pub. L. 103–301, S.J.Res. 178, 108 Stat. 1558
103–302	August 23, 1994	Indian Dams Safety Act of 1994	To provide for the maintenance of dams located on Indian lands by the Bureau of Indian Affairs or through contracts with Indian tribes.	Pub. L. 103–302, H.R. 1426, 108 Stat. 1560
103–303	August 23, 1994	District of Columbia Justice Reform Act of 1994	To amend title 11, District of Columbia Code, to increase the maximum amount in controversy permitted for cases under the jurisdiction of the Small Claims and Conciliation Branch of the Superior Court of the District of Columbia.	Pub. L. 103–303, H.R. 1631, 108 Stat. 1564
103–304	August 23, 1994	King Holiday and Service Act of 1994	To authorize appropriations for the Martin Luther King, Jr. Federal Holiday Commission, to extend such Commission, and to support the planning and performance of national service opportunities in conjunction with the Federal legal holiday honoring the birthday of Martin Luther King, Jr.	Pub. L. 103–304, H.R. 1933, 108 Stat. 1565
103–305	August 23, 1994	Federal Aviation Administration Authorization Act of 1994	To amend the Airport and Airway Improvement Act of 1982 to authorize appropriations for fiscal years 1994, 1995, and 1996, and for other purposes.	Pub. L. 103–305, H.R. 2739, 108 Stat. 1569
103–306	August 23, 1994	Foreign Operations, Export Financing, and Related Programs Appropriations Act, 1995	Making appropriations for foreign operations, export financing, and related programs for the fiscal year ending September 30, 1995, and making supplemental appropriations for such programs for the fiscal year ending September 30, 1994, and for other purposes.	Pub. L. 103–306, H.R. 4426, 108 Stat. 1608
103–307	August 23, 1994	Military Construction Appropriations Act, 1995	Making appropriations for military construction for the Department of Defense for the fiscal year ending September 30, 1995, and for other purposes.	Pub. L. 103–307, H.R. 4453, 108 Stat. 1659
103–308	August 23, 1994	(No short title)	Designating December 7 of each year as "National Pearl Harbor Remembrance Day".	Pub. L. 103–308, H.J.Res. 131, 108 Stat. 1669
103–309	August 23, 1994	(No short title)	Designating October 1993 and October 1994 as "Italian-American Heritage and Culture Month".	Pub. L. 103–309, H.J.Res. 175, 108 Stat. 1670
103–310	August 25, 1994	(No short title)	To direct the Administrator of General Services to acquire by transfer the Old U.S. Mint in San Francisco, California, and for other purposes.	Pub. L. 103–310, H.R. 4812, 108 Stat. 1672
103–311	August 26, 1994	Hazardous Materials Transportation Act Amendments of 1993	To amend the Hazardous Materials Transportation Act to authorize appropriations for fiscal years 1994, 1995, 1996, and 1997.	Pub. L. 103–311, H.R. 2178, 108 Stat. 1673
103–312	August 26, 1994	Federal Trade Commission Act Amendments of 1994	To amend the Federal Trade Commission Act to extend the authorization of appropriations in such Act, and for other purposes.	Pub. L. 103–312, H.R. 2243, 108 Stat. 1691
103–313	August 26, 1994	Farmington Wild and Scenic River Act	To designate a portion of the Farmington River in Connecticut as a component of the National Wild and Scenic Rivers System.	Pub. L. 103–313, H.R. 2815, 108 Stat. 1699
103–314	August 26, 1994	George Washington National Forest Mount Pleasant Scenic Area Act	To designate certain lands in the Commonwealth of Virginia as the George Washington National Forest Mount Pleasant Scenic Area.	Pub. L. 103–314, H.R. 2942, 108 Stat. 1703
103–315	August 26, 1994	(No short title)	To redesignate the Post Office building located at 13th and Rockland Streets in Reading, Pennsylvania, as the "Gus Yatron Federal Postal Facility".	Pub. L. 103–315, H.R. 3197, 108 Stat. 1706
103–316	August 26, 1994	Energy and Water Development Appropriations Act, 1995	Making appropriations for energy and water development for the fiscal year ending September 30, 1995, and for other purposes.	Pub. L. 103–316, H.R. 4506, 108 Stat. 1707
103–317	August 26, 1994	Departments of Commerce, Justice, and State, the Judiciary and Related Agencies Appropriations Act, 1995	Making appropriations for the Departments of Commerce, Justice, and State, the Judiciary, and related agencies programs for the fiscal year ending September 30, 1995, and making supplemental appropriations for these departments and agencies for the fiscal year ending September 30, 1994, and for other purposes.	Pub. L. 103–317, H.R. 4603, 108 Stat. 1724
103–318	August 26, 1994	Northern Great Plains Rural Development Act	To establish the Northern Great Plains Rural Development Commission, and for other purposes.	Pub. L. 103–318, S. 2099, 108 Stat. 1781
103–319	August 26, 1994	(No short title)	To designate the week beginning on November 20, 1994, and ending on November 26, 1994, as "National Family Caregivers Week".	Pub. L. 103–319, S.J.Res. 153, 108 Stat. 1790
103–320	August 26, 1994	(No short title)	Designating September 16, 1994, as "National POW/MIA Recognition Day" and authorizing display of the National League of Families POW/MIA flag.	Pub. L. 103–320, S.J.Res. 196, 108 Stat. 1791
103–321	August 26, 1994	Commemorative Works Act	To amend the Commemorative Works Act, and for other purposes.	Pub. L. 103–321, H.R. 2947, 108 Stat. 1793
103–322	September 13, 1994	Violent Crime Control and Law Enforcement Act of 1994	To control and prevent crime.	Pub. L. 103–322, H.R. 3355, 108 Stat. 1796
103–323	September 21, 1994	(No short title)	To restore Federal services to the Pokagon Band of Potawatomi Indians.	Pub. L. 103–323, S. 1066, 108 Stat. 2152
103–324	September 21, 1994	Little Traverse Bay Bands of Odawa Indians and the Little River Band of Ottawa Indians Act	To reaffirm and clarify the Federal relationships of the Little Traverse Bay Bands of Odawa Indians and the Little River Band of Ottawa Indians as distinct federally recognized Indian tribes, and for other purposes.	Pub. L. 103–324, S. 1357, 108 Stat. 2156
103–325	September 23, 1994	Riegle Community Development and Regulatory Improvement Act of 1994	To reduce administrative requirements for insured depository institutions to the extent consistent with safe and sound banking practices, to facilitate the establishment of community development financial institutions, and for other purposes.	Pub. L. 103–325, H.R. 3474, 108 Stat. 2160
103–326	September 23, 1994	(No short title)	To reduce the restrictions on lands conveyed by deed under the Act of June 8, 1926.	Pub. L. 103–326, S. 859, 108 Stat. 2297
103–327	September 28, 1994	Departments of Veterans Affairs and Housing and Urban Development, and Independent Agencies Appropriations Act, 1995	Making appropriations for the Departments of Veterans Affairs and Housing and Urban Development, and for sundry independent agencies, boards, commissions, corporations, and offices for the fiscal year ending September 30, 1995, and for other purposes.	Pub. L. 103–327, H.R. 4624, 108 Stat. 2298
103–328	September 29, 1994	Riegle-Neal Interstate Banking and Branching Efficiency Act of 1994	To amend the Bank Holding Company Act of 1956, the Revised Statutes of the United States, and the Federal Deposit Insurance Act to provide for interstate banking and branching.	Pub. L. 103–328, H.R. 3841, 108 Stat. 2338
103–329	September 30, 1994	Treasury, Postal Service and General Government Appropriations Act, 1995	Making appropriations for the Treasury Department, the United States Postal Service, the Executive Office of the President, and certain Independent Agencies, for the fiscal year ending September 30, 1995, and for other purposes.	Pub. L. 103–329, H.R. 4539, 108 Stat. 2382
103–330	September 30, 1994	Agricultural, Rural Development, Food and Drug Administration, and Related Agencies Appropriations Act, 1995	Making appropriations for Agriculture, Rural Development, Food and Drug Administration, and Related Agencies programs for the fiscal year ending September 30, 1995, and for other purposes.	Pub. L. 103–330, H.R. 4554, 108 Stat. 2435
103–331	September 30, 1994	Department of Transportation and Related Agencies Appropriations Act, 1995	Making appropriations for the Department of Transportation and related agencies for the fiscal year ending September 30, 1995, and for other purposes.	Pub. L. 103–331, H.R. 4556, 108 Stat. 2471
103–332	September 30, 1994	Department of the Interior and Related Agencies Appropriations Act, 1995	Making appropriations for the Department of the Interior and related agencies for the fiscal year ending September 30, 1995, and for other purposes.	Pub. L. 103–332, H.R. 4602, 108 Stat. 2499
103–333	September 30, 1994	Departments of Labor, Health and Human Services, and Education, and Related Agencies Appropriations Act, 1995	Making appropriations for the Departments of Labor, Health and Human Services, and Education, and related agencies, for the fiscal year ending September 30, 1995, and for other purposes.	Pub. L. 103–333, H.R. 4606, 108 Stat. 2539
103–334	September 30, 1994	(No short title)	Making appropriations for the government of the District of Columbia and other activities chargeable in whole or in part against the revenues of said District for the fiscal year ending September 30, 1995, and for other purposes.	Pub. L. 103–334, H.R. 4649, 108 Stat. 2576
103–335	September 30, 1994	Department of Defense Appropriations Act, 1995	Making appropriations for the Department of Defense for the fiscal year ending September 30, 1995, and for other purposes.	Pub. L. 103–335, H.R. 4650, 108 Stat. 2599
103–336	October 3, 1994	(No short title)	To designate the building at 41-42 Norre Gade in Saint Thomas, Virgin Islands, for the period of time during which it houses operations of the United States Postal Service, as the Alvaro de Lugo Post Office; and to amend title 39, United States Code, to make applicable with respect to the United States Postal Service exclusionary authority relating to the treatment of reemployed annuitants under the civil service retirement laws, and for other purposes.	Pub. L. 103–336, H.R. 4190, 108 Stat. 2661
103–337	October 5, 1994	National Defense Authorization Act for Fiscal Year 1995	To authorize appropriations for fiscal year 1995 for military activities of the Department of Defense, for military construction, and for defense activities of the Department of Energy, to prescribe personnel strengths for such fiscal year for the Armed Forces, and for other purposes.	Pub. L. 103–337, S. 2182, 108 Stat. 2663
103–338	October 6, 1994	(No short title)	To designate the facility of the United States Postal Service located at 401 South Washington Street in Chillicothe, Missouri, as the "Jerry L. Litton United States Post Office Building", and to authorize travel and transportation expenses for certain Federal career appointees, and for other purposes.	Pub. L. 103–338, H.R. 1779, 108 Stat. 3114
103–339	October 6, 1994	Guam Excess Lands Act	To provide for the transfer of excess land to the Government of Guam, and for other purposes.	Pub. L. 103–339, H.R. 2144, 108 Stat. 3116
103–340	October 6, 1994	Junior Duck Stamp Conservation and Design Program Act of 1994	To authorize the Secretary of the Interior to carry out a program to be known as the Junior Duck Stamp Conservation and Design Program, and for other purposes.	Pub. L. 103–340, H.R. 3679, 108 Stat. 3119
103–341	October 6, 1994	(No short title)	To designate the United States Post Office located at 220 South 40th Avenue in Hattiesburg, Mississippi, as the "Roy M. Wheat Post Office".	Pub. L. 103–341, H.R. 3839, 108 Stat. 3122
103–342	October 6, 1994	(No short title)	To designate the Post Office building located at 1601 Highway 35 in Middletown, New Jersey, as the "Candace White United States Post Office".	Pub. L. 103–342, H.R. 4177, 108 Stat. 3123
103–343	October 6, 1994	(No short title)	To designate the United States Post Office located at 9630 Estate Thomas in Saint Thomas, Virgin Islands, as the "Aubrey C. Ottley United States Post Office".	Pub. L. 103–343, H.R. 4191, 108 Stat. 3124
103–344	October 6, 1994	American Indian Religious Freedom Act Amendments of 1994	To amend the American Indian Religious Freedom Act to provide for the traditional use of peyote by Indians for religious purposes, and for other purposes.	Pub. L. 103–344, H.R. 4230, 108 Stat. 3125
103–345	October 6, 1994	President John F. Kennedy Assassination Records Collection Extension Act of 1994	To extend and make amendments to the President John F. Kennedy Assassination Records Collection Act of 1992.	Pub. L. 103–345, H.R. 4569, 108 Stat. 3128
103–346	October 6, 1994	(No short title)	To direct the Secretary of the Interior to convey to the City of Imperial Beach, California, approximately 1 acre of land in the Tijuana Slough National Wildlife Refuge.	Pub. L. 103–346, H.R. 4647, 108 Stat. 3131
103–347	October 6, 1994	(No short title)	To designate October 1994 as "Crime Prevention Month".	Pub. L. 103–347, H.J.Res. 363, 108 Stat. 3132
103–348	October 6, 1994	Vegetable Ink Printing Act of 1994	To require that all Federal lithographic printing be performed using ink made from vegetable oil and materials derived from other renewable resources, and for other purposes.	Pub. L. 103–348, S. 716, 108 Stat. 3133
103–349	October 6, 1994	Plant Variety Protection Act Amendments of 1994	To amend the Plant Variety Protection Act to make such Act consistent with the International Convention for the Protection of New Varieties of Plants of March 19, 1991, to which the United States is a signatory, and for other purposes.	Pub. L. 103–349, S. 1406, 108 Stat. 3136
103–350	October 6, 1994	Piscataway Park Expansion Act of 1994	To expand the boundaries of the Piscataway Park, and for other purposes.	Pub. L. 103–350, S. 1703, 108 Stat. 3146
103–351	October 8, 1994	(No short title)	To express the sense of the Congress in commemoration of the 75th anniversary of Grand Canyon National Park.	Pub. L. 103–351, S.J.Res. 221, 108 Stat. 3147
103–352	October 10, 1994	(No short title)	To provide for the continuation of certain fee collections for the expenses of the Securities and Exchange Commission for fiscal year 1995.	Pub. L. 103–352, H.R. 5060, 108 Stat. 3148
103–353	October 13, 1994	Uniformed Services Employment and Re-employment Rights Act of 1994	To amend title 38, United States Code, to improve reemployment rights and benefits of veterans and other benefits of employment of certain members of the uniformed services, and for other purposes.	Pub. L. 103–353, H.R. 995, 108 Stat. 3149
103–354	October 13, 1994	Federal Crop Insurance Reform and Department of Agriculture Reorganization Act of 1994	To reform the Federal crop insurance program, and for other purposes.	Pub. L. 103–354, H.R. 4217, 108 Stat. 3178
103–355	October 13, 1994	Federal Acquisition Streamlining Act of 1994	To revise and streamline the acquisition laws of the Federal Government, and for other purposes.	Pub. L. 103–355, S. 1587, 108 Stat. 3243
103–356	October 13, 1994	Government Management Reform Act of 1994	To provide a more effective, efficient, and responsive Government.	Pub. L. 103–356, S. 2170, 108 Stat. 3410
103–357	October 14, 1994	(No short title)	To amend the Act entitled "An Act to provide for the extension of certain Federal benefits, services, and assistance to the Pascua Yaqui Indians of Arizona, and for other purposes".	Pub. L. 103–357, H.R. 734, 108 Stat. 3418
103–358	October 14, 1994	Child Abuse Accountability Act	To amend title 5, United States Code, to permit the garnishment of an annuity under the Civil Service Retirement System or the Federal Employees’ Retirement System, if necessary to satisfy a judgment against an annuitant for physically, sexually, or emotionally abusing a child.	Pub. L. 103–358, H.R. 3694, 108 Stat. 3420
103–359	October 14, 1994	Intelligence Authorization Act for Fiscal Year 1995	To authorize appropriations for fiscal year 1995 for intelligence and intelligence-related activities of the United States Government, the Community Management Account, and the Central Intelligence Agency Retirement and Disability System, and for other purposes.	Pub. L. 103–359, H.R. 4299, 108 Stat. 3423
103–360	October 14, 1994	(No short title)	To designate the United States courthouse to be constructed at 907 Richland Street in Columbia, South Carolina, as the "Matthew J. Perry, Jr. United States Courthouse".	Pub. L. 103–360, H.R. 4543, 108 Stat. 3462
103–361	October 14, 1994	(No short title)	To designate the second Sunday in October 1994 as "National Children's Day".	Pub. L. 103–361, H.J.Res. 389, 108 Stat. 3463
103–362	October 14, 1994	(No short title)	To establish the fourth Sunday of July as "Parents' Day".	Pub. L. 103–362, H.J.Res. 398, 108 Stat. 3465
103–363	October 14, 1994	(No short title)	Designating the week beginning October 16, 1994, as "National Penny Charity Week".	Pub. L. 103–363, H.J.Res. 415, 108 Stat. 3466
103–364	October 14, 1994	Saguaro National Park Establishment Act of 1994	To establish the Saguaro National Park in the State of Arizona, and for other purposes.	Pub. L. 103–364, S. 316, 108 Stat. 3467
103–365	October 14, 1994	Arizona Wilderness Land Title Resolution Act of 1994	To resolve the status of certain lands in Arizona that are subject to a claim as a grant of public lands for railroad purposes, and for other purposes.	Pub. L. 103–365, S. 1233, 108 Stat. 3469
103–366	October 14, 1994	(No short title)	To designate 1994 as "The Year of Gospel Music".	Pub. L. 103–366, S.J.Res. 157, 108 Stat. 3472
103–367	October 14, 1994	(No short title)	To designate October 1994 as "National Breast Cancer Awareness Month".	Pub. L. 103–367, S.J.Res. 185, 108 Stat. 3473
103–368	October 14, 1994	(No short title)	Designating 1995 as the "Year of the Grandparent".	Pub. L. 103–368, S.J.Res. 198, 108 Stat. 3475
103–369	October 18, 1994	Satellite Home Viewer Act of 1994	To amend title 17, United States Code, relating to the definition of a local service area of a primary transmitter, and for other purposes.	Pub. L. 103–369, S. 2406, 108 Stat. 3477
103–370	October 18, 1994	(No short title)	To designate October 19, 1994, as "National Mammography Day".	Pub. L. 103–370, S.J.Res. 220, 108 Stat. 3483
103–371	October 19, 1994	Petroleum Marketing Practices Act Amendments of 1994	To amend the Petroleum Marketing Practices Act.	Pub. L. 103–371, H.R. 1520, 108 Stat. 3484
103–372	October 19, 1994	(No short title)	To provide for an investigation of the whereabouts of the United States citizens and others who have been missing from Cyprus since 1974.	Pub. L. 103–372, H.R. 2826, 108 Stat. 3487
103–373	October 19, 1994	Federal Payment Reauthorization Act of 1994	To amend the District of Columbia Self-Government and Governmental Reorganization Act to reauthorize the annual Federal payment to the District of Columbia for fiscal year 1996, and for other purposes.	Pub. L. 103–373, H.R. 2902, 108 Stat. 3488
103–374	October 19, 1994	(No short title)	To authorize appropriations for carrying out the Earthquake Hazards Reduction Act of 1977 for fiscal years 1995 and 1996.	Pub. L. 103–374, H.R. 3485, 108 Stat. 3492
103–375	October 19, 1994	North American Wetlands Conservation Act Amendments of 1994	To authorize appropriations to assist in carrying out the North American Wetlands Conservation Act for fiscal years 1995 through 1998, and for other purposes.	Pub. L. 103–375, H.R. 4308, 108 Stat. 3494
103–376	October 19, 1994	Farm Credit System Agricultural Export and Risk Management Act	To amend the Farm Credit Act of 1971 to enhance the ability of the banks for cooperatives to finance agricultural exports, and for other purposes.	Pub. L. 103–376, H.R. 4379, 108 Stat. 3497
103–377	October 19, 1994	Mohegan Nation of Connecticut Land Claims Settlement Act of 1994	To settle Indian land claims within the State of Connecticut, and for other purposes.	Pub. L. 103–377, H.R. 4653, 108 Stat. 3501
103–378	October 19, 1994	(No short title)	To authorize the transfer of naval vessels to certain foreign countries.	Pub. L. 103–378, H.R. 5155, 108 Stat. 3508
103–379	October 19, 1994	(No short title)	Designating the months of March 1995 and March 1996 as "Irish-American Heritage Month".	Pub. L. 103–379, H.J.Res. 401, 108 Stat. 3510
103–380	October 19, 1994	(No short title)	Providing for temporary extension of the application of the final paragraph of section 10 of the Railway Labor Act with respect to the dispute between the Soo Line Railroad Company and certain of its employees.	Pub. L. 103–380, H.J.Res. 417, 108 Stat. 3512
103–381	October 19, 1994	African Conflict Resolution Act	To authorize assistance to promote the peaceful resolution of conflicts in Africa.	Pub. L. 103–381, S. 2475, 108 Stat. 3513
103–382	October 20, 1994	Improving America's Schools Act of 1994	To extend for five years the authorizations of appropriations for the programs under the Elementary and Secondary Education Act of 1965, and for certain other purposes.	Pub. L. 103–382, H.R. 6, 108 Stat. 3518
103–383	October 20, 1994	Full Faith and Credit for Child Support Orders Act	To provide that a State court may not modify an order of another State court requiring the payment of child support unless the recipient of child support payments resides in the State in which the modification is sought or consents to the seeking of the modification in that court.	Pub. L. 103–383, S. 922, 108 Stat. 4063
103–384	October 22, 1994	Native American Veterans' Memorial Establishment Act of 1994	To provide for a National Native American Veterans’ Memorial.	Pub. L. 103–384, H.R. 2135, 108 Stat. 4067
103–385	October 22, 1994	(No short title)	To designate the Federal building in Wichita Falls, Texas, which is currently known as the Main Post Office, as the "Graham B. Purcell, Jr., Post Office and Federal Building".	Pub. L. 103–385, H.R. 2294, 108 Stat. 4069
103–386	October 22, 1994	(No short title)	To designate the United States Post Office located at 100 Veterans Drive in Saint Thomas, Virgin Islands, as the "Arturo R. Watlington, Sr. United States Post Office".	Pub. L. 103–386, H.R. 4192, 108 Stat. 4070
103–387	October 22, 1994	Social Security Domestic Employment Reform Act of 1994	To make improvements in the old-age, survivors, and disability insurance program under title II of the Social Security Act.	Pub. L. 103–387, H.R. 4278, 108 Stat. 4071
103–388	October 22, 1994	Federal Employees Family Friendly Leave Act	To amend chapter 63 of title 5, United States Code, to provide that an employee of the Federal Government may use sick leave to attend to the medical needs of a family member, and for other purposes.	Pub. L. 103–388, H.R. 4361, 108 Stat. 4079
103–389	October 22, 1994	Unlisted Trading Privileges Act of 1994	To amend the Securities Exchange Act of 1934 with respect to the extension of unlisted trading privileges for corporate securities, and for other purposes.	Pub. L. 103–389, H.R. 4535, 108 Stat. 4081
103–390	October 22, 1994	(No short title)	To grant the consent of the Congress to the Kansas and Missouri Metropolitan Culture District Compact.	Pub. L. 103–390, H.R. 4896, 108 Stat. 4085
103–391	October 22, 1994	Rhinoceros and Tiger Conservation Act of 1994	To assist in the conservation of rhinoceros and tigers by supporting and providing financial resources for the conservation programs of nations whose activities directly or indirectly affect rhinoceros and tiger populations, and of the CITES Secretariat.	Pub. L. 103–391, H.R. 4924, 108 Stat. 4094
103–392	October 22, 1994	Jobs Through Trade Expansion Act of 1994	To extend the authorities of the Overseas Private Investment Corporation, and for other purposes.	Pub. L. 103–392, H.R. 4950, 108 Stat. 4098
103–393	October 22, 1994	Water Bank Extension Act of 1994	To authorize the Secretary of Agriculture to extend for one year Water Bank Act agreements that are due to expire on December 31, 1994.	Pub. L. 103–393, H.R. 5053, 108 Stat. 4105
103–394	October 22, 1994	Bankruptcy Reform Act of 1994	To amend title 11 of the United States Code.	Pub. L. 103–394, H.R. 5116, 108 Stat. 4106
103–395	October 22, 1994	(No short title)	Providing for the convening of the First Session of the One Hundred Fourth Congress.	Pub. L. 103–395, H.J.Res. 425, 108 Stat. 4152
103–396	October 22, 1994	Animal Medicinal Drug Use Clarification Act of 1994	To amend the Federal Food, Drug, and Cosmetic Act to clarify the application of the Act with respect to alternate uses of new animal drugs and new drugs intended for human use, and for other purposes.	Pub. L. 103–396, S. 340, 108 Stat. 4153
103–397	October 22, 1994	Payments in Lieu of Taxes Act	To amend title 31, United States Code, to increase Federal payments to units of general local government for entitlement lands, and for other purposes.	Pub. L. 103–397, S. 455, 108 Stat. 4156
103–398	October 22, 1994	Lincoln County, Montana, Lands Transfer Act of 1994	To provide for the transfer of certain United States Forest Service lands located in Lincoln County, Montana, to Lincoln County in the State of Montana.	Pub. L. 103–398, S. 528, 108 Stat. 4162
103–399	October 22, 1994	Indian Lands Open Dump Cleanup Act of 1994	To clean up open dumps on Indian lands, and for other purposes.	Pub. L. 103–399, S. 720, 108 Stat. 4164
103–400	October 22, 1994	United States-Mexico Border Health Commission Act	To authorize and encourage the President to conclude an agreement with Mexico to establish a United States-Mexico Border Health Commission.	Pub. L. 103–400, S. 1225, 108 Stat. 4169
103–401	October 22, 1994	Pension Annuitants Protection Act of 1994	To amend the Employee Retirement Income Security Act of 1974 in order to provide for the availability of remedies for certain former pension plan participants and beneficiaries.	Pub. L. 103–401, S. 1312, 108 Stat. 4172
103–402	October 22, 1994	(No short title)	To amend the Aleutian and Pribilof Restitution Act to increase authorization for appropriation to compensate Aleut villages for church property lost, damaged, or destroyed during World War II.	Pub. L. 103–402, S. 1457, 108 Stat. 4174
103–403	October 22, 1994	Small Business Administration Reauthorization and Amendments Act of 1994	To amend the Small Business Act and the Small Business Investment Act of 1958, and for other purposes.	Pub. L. 103–403, S. 2060, 108 Stat. 4175
103–404	October 22, 1994	(No short title)	To designate the United States courthouse that is scheduled to be constructed in Concord, New Hampshire, as the "Warren B. Rudman United States Courthouse", and for other purposes.	Pub. L. 103–404, S. 2073, 108 Stat. 4206
103–405	October 22, 1994	(No short title)	To designate the United States Courthouse in Detroit, Michigan, as the "Theodore Levin Courthouse", and for other purposes.	Pub. L. 103–405, S. 2395, 108 Stat. 4208
103–406	October 22, 1994	Energy Policy and Conservation Act Amendments of 1994	To amend the Energy Policy and Conservation Act to manage the Strategic Petroleum Reserve more effectively, and for other purposes.	Pub. L. 103–406, S. 2466, 108 Stat. 4209
103–407	October 22, 1994	Sheep Promotion, Research, and Information Act of 1994	To enable producers and feeders of sheep and importers of sheep and sheep products to develop, finance, and carry out a nationally coordinated program for sheep and sheep product promotion, research, and information, and for other purposes.	Pub. L. 103–407, S. 2500, 108 Stat. 4210
103–408	October 22, 1994	(No short title)	To recognize the achievements of radio amateurs, and to establish support for such amateurs as national policy.	Pub. L. 103–408, S.J.Res. 90, 108 Stat. 4228
103–409	October 25, 1994	FEGLI Living Benefits Act	To amend chapter 87 of title 5, United States Code, to provide that group life insurance benefits under such chapter may, upon application, be paid out to an insured individual who is terminally ill; to provide for continuation of health benefits coverage for certain individuals enrolled in health benefits plans administered by the Office of the Comptroller of the Currency or the Office of Thrift Supervision; and for other purposes.	Pub. L. 103–409, H.R. 512, 108 Stat. 4230
103–410	October 25, 1994	(No short title)	To designate the Federal building located at 600 Princess Anne Street in Fredericksburg, Virginia as the "Samuel E. Perry Postal Building".	Pub. L. 103–410, H.R. 2056, 108 Stat. 4235
103–411	October 25, 1994	Independent Safety Board Act Amendments of 1994	To amend the Independent Safety Board Act of 1974 to authorize appropriations for fiscal years 1994, 1995, and 1996, and for other purposes.	Pub. L. 103–411, H.R. 2440, 108 Stat. 4236
103–412	October 25, 1994	American Indian Trust Fund Management Reform Act of 1994	To reform the management of Indian Trust Funds, and for other purposes.	Pub. L. 103–412, H.R. 4833, 108 Stat. 4239
103–413	October 25, 1994	Indian Self-Determination Act Amendments of 1994	To specify the terms of contracts entered into by the United States and Indian tribal organizations under the Indian Self-Determination and Education Assistance Act and to provide for tribal Self-Governance, and for other purposes.	Pub. L. 103–413, H.R. 4842, 108 Stat. 4250
103–414	October 25, 1994	Communications Assistance for Law Enforcement Act	To amend title 18, United States Code, to make clear a telecommunications carrier’s duty to cooperate in the interception of communications for law enforcement purposes, and for other purposes.	Pub. L. 103–414, H.R. 4922, 108 Stat. 4279
103-415	October 25, 1994	(No short title)	To make certain technical amendments relating to the State Department Basic Authorities Act of 1956, the United States Information and Educational Exchange Act of 1948, and other provisions of law.	Pub. L. 103–415, H.R. 5034, 108 Stat. 4299
103-416	October 25, 1994	Immigration and Nationality Technical Corrections Act of 1994	To amend title III of the Immigration and Nationality Act to make changes in the laws relating to nationality and naturalization.	Pub. L. 103–416, H.R. 783, 108 Stat. 4305
103-417	October 25, 1994	Dietary Supplement Health and Education Act of 1994	To amend the Federal Food, Drug, and Cosmetic Act to establish standards with respect to dietary supplements, and for other purposes.	Pub. L. 103–417, S. 784, 108 Stat. 4325
103-418	October 25, 1994	Veterans' Compensation Cost-of-Living Adjustment Act of 1994	To amend title 38, United States Code, to provide a cost-of-living adjustment in the rates of disability compensation for veterans with service-connected disabilities and the rates of dependency and indemnity compensation for survivors of such veterans, to revise and improve veterans’ benefits programs, and for other purposes.	Pub. L. 103–418, S. 1927, 108 Stat. 4336
103–419	October 25, 1994	Civil Rights Commission Amendments Act of 1994	To amend the United States Commission on Civil Rights Act of 1983.	Pub. L. 103–419, S. 2372, 108 Stat. 4338
103–420	October 25, 1994	Judicial Amendments Act of 1994	To make improvements in the operation and administration of the Federal courts, and for other purposes.	Pub. L. 103–420, S. 2407, 108 Stat. 4343
103–421	October 25, 1994	Base Closure Community Redevelopment and Homeless Assistance Act of 1994	To revise and improve the process for disposing of buildings and property at military installations under the base closure laws.	Pub. L. 103–421, S. 2534, 108 Stat. 4346
103–422	October 25, 1994	(No short title)	To approve the location of a Thomas Paine Memorial.	Pub. L. 103–422, S.J.Res. 227, 108 Stat. 4356
103–423	October 25, 1994	(No short title)	Regarding United States policy toward Haiti.	Pub. L. 103–423, S.J.Res. 229, 108 Stat. 4358
103–424	October 29, 1994	(No short title)	To authorize appropriations for the United States Office of Special Counsel, the Merit Systems Protection Board, and for other purposes.	Pub. L. 103–424, H.R. 2970, 108 Stat. 4361
103–425	October 31, 1994	(No short title)	To amend the Defense Department Overseas Teachers Pay and Personnel Practices Act.	Pub. L. 103–425, H.R. 3499, 108 Stat. 4369
103–426	October 31, 1994	(No short title)	To authorize the Secretary of the Interior to negotiate agreements for the use of Outer Continental Shelf sand, gravel, and shell resources.	Pub. L. 103–426, H.R. 3678, 108 Stat. 4371
103–427	October 31, 1994	(No short title)	To ensure that all timber-dependent communities qualify for loans and grants from the Rural Development Administration.	Pub. L. 103–427, H.R. 4196, 108 Stat. 4373
103–428	October 31, 1994	(No short title)	To authorize the Export–Import Bank of the United States to provide financing for the export of nonlethal defense articles and defense services the primary end use of which will be for civilian purposes.	Pub. L. 103–428, H.R. 4455, 108 Stat. 4375
103–429	October 31, 1994	(No short title)	To codify without substantive change recent laws related to transportation and to improve the United States Code.	Pub. L. 103–429, H.R. 4778, 108 Stat. 4377
103–430	October 31, 1994	Census Address List Improvement Act of 1994	To amend title 13, United States Code, to improve the accuracy of census address lists, and for other purposes.	Pub. L. 103–430, H.R. 5084, 108 Stat. 4393
103–431	October 31, 1994	Ocean Pollution Reduction Act	To amend the Federal Water Pollution Control Act relating to San Diego ocean discharge and waste water reclamation.	Pub. L. 103–431, H.R. 5176, 108 Stat. 4396
103–432	October 31, 1994	Social Security Act Amendments of 1994	To amend the Social Security Act and related Acts to make miscellaneous and technical amendments, and for other purposes.	Pub. L. 103–432, H.R. 5252, 108 Stat. 4398
103–433	October 31, 1994	California Desert Protection Act of 1994	To designate certain lands in the California Desert as wilderness, to establish the Death Valley and Joshua Tree National Parks, to establish the Mojave National Preserve, and for other purposes.	Pub. L. 103–433, S. 21, 108 Stat. 4471
103–434	October 31, 1994	Yavapai-Prescott Indian Tribe Water Rights Settlement Act of 1994	To provide for the settlement of the water rights claims of the Yavapai-Prescott Indian Tribe in Yavapai County, Arizona, and for other purposes.	Pub. L. 103–434, S. 1146, 108 Stat. 4526
103–435	November 2, 1994	(No short title)	To make certain technical corrections, and for other purposes.	Pub. L. 103–435, H.R. 4709, 108 Stat. 4566
103–436	November 2, 1994	Confederated Tribes of the Colville Reservation Grand Coulee Dam Settlement Act	To provide for the settlement of the claims of the Confederated Tribes of the Colville Reservation concerning their contribution to the production of hydropower by the Grand Coulee Dam, and for other purposes.	Pub. L. 103–436, H.R. 4757, 108 Stat. 4577
103–437	November 2, 1994	(No short title)	To make technical improvements in the United States Code by amending provisions to reflect the current names of congressional committees.	Pub. L. 103–437, H.R. 4777, 108 Stat. 4581
103–438	November 2, 1994	International Antitrust Enforcement Assistance Act of 1994	To facilitate obtaining foreign-located antitrust evidence by authorizing the Attorney General of the United States and the Federal Trade Commission to provide, in accordance with antitrust mutual assistance agreements, antitrust evidence to foreign antitrust authorities on a reciprocal basis; and for other purposes.	Pub. L. 103–438, H.R. 4781, 108 Stat. 4597
103–439	November 2, 1994	Central Midwest Interstate Low-Level Radioactive Waste Compact Amendments Consent Act of 1994	To grant the consent of the Congress to amendments to the Central Midwest Interstate Low-Level Radioactive Waste Compact.	Pub. L. 103–439, H.R. 4814, 108 Stat. 4607
103–440	November 2, 1994	(No short title)	To authorize appropriations for high-speed ground transportation, and for other purposes.	Pub. L. 103–440, H.R. 4867, 108 Stat. 4615
103–441	November 2, 1994	(No short title)	To designate the Federal building and United States courthouse in Detroit, Michigan, as the "Theodore Levin Federal Building and United States Courthouse".	Pub. L. 103–441, H.R. 4967, 108 Stat. 4629
103–442	November 2, 1994	(No short title)	To amend title 18, United States Code, with respect to certain crimes relating to Congressional medals of honor.	Pub. L. 103–442, H.R. 5102, 108 Stat. 4630
103–443	November 2, 1994	(No short title)	To amend the Omnibus Budget Reconciliation Act of 1993 to permit the prompt sharing of timber sale receipts of the Forest Service and the Bureau of Land Management.	Pub. L. 103–443, H.R. 5161, 108 Stat. 4631
103–444	November 2, 1994	Crow Boundary Settlement Act of 1994	To resolve the 107th meridian boundary dispute between the Crow Indian Tribe and the United States.	Pub. L. 103–444, H.R. 5200, 108 Stat. 4632
103–445	November 2, 1994	(No short title)	To provide for the acceptance by the Secretary of Education of applications submitted by the local educational agency serving the Window Rock Unified School District, Window Rock, Arizona, under section 3 of the Act of September 30, 1950 (Public Law 874, 81st Congress) for fiscal years 1994 and 1995.	Pub. L. 103–445, H.R. 5220, 108 Stat. 4644
103–446	November 2, 1994	Veterans' Benefits Improvements Act of 1994	To amend title 38, United States Code, to revise and improve veterans’ benefits programs, and for other purposes.	Pub. L. 103–446, H.R. 5244, 108 Stat. 4645
103–447	November 2, 1994	International Narcotics Control Corrections Act of 1994	To amend the Foreign Assistance Act of 1961 to make certain corrections relating to international narcotics control activities, and for other purposes.	Pub. L. 103–447, H.R. 5246, 108 Stat. 4691
103–448	November 2, 1994	Healthy Meals for Healthy Americans Act of 1994	To amend the Child Nutrition Act of 1966 and the National School Lunch Act to promote healthy eating habits for children and to extend certain authorities contained in such Acts through fiscal year 1998, and for other purposes.	Pub. L. 103–448, S. 1614, 108 Stat. 4699
103–449	November 2, 1994	Quinebaug and Shetucket Rivers Valley National Heritage Corridor Act of 1994	To establish the Quinebaug and Shetucket Rivers Valley National Heritage Corridor in the State of Connecticut, and for other purposes.	Pub. L. 103–449, H.R. 1348, 108 Stat. 4752
103–450	November 2, 1994	(No short title)	To expand the boundaries of the Red Rock Canyon National Conservation Area.	Pub. L. 103–450, H.R. 3050, 108 Stat. 4766
103–451	November 2, 1994	National Maritime Heritage Act of 1994	To establish a National Maritime Heritage Program to make grants available for educational programs and the restoration of America's cultural resources for the purpose of preserving America's endangered maritime heritage.	Pub. L. 103–451, H.R. 3059, 108 Stat. 4769
103–452	November 2, 1994	Veterans Health Programs Extension Act of 1994	To amend title 38, United States Code, to extend certain expiring veterans’ health care programs, and for other purposes.	Pub. L. 103–452, H.R. 3313, 108 Stat. 4783
103–453	November 2, 1994	(No short title)	To designate the United States post office located at 212 Coleman Avenue in Waveland, Mississippi, as the "John Longo, Jr. Post Office".	Pub. L. 103–453, H.R. 3984, 108 Stat. 4790
103–454	November 2, 1994	(No short title)	To clarify the status of the Tlingit and Haida, and for other purposes.	Pub. L. 103–454, H.R. 4180, 108 Stat. 4791
103–455	November 2, 1994	(No short title)	To designate the United States Post Office located at 100 Vester Gade, in Cruz Bay, Saint John, Virgin Islands, as the "Ubaldina Simmons United States Post Office".	Pub. L. 103–455, H.R. 4193, 108 Stat. 4797
103–456	November 2, 1994	(No short title)	To designate the Post Office building at 115 West Chester in Ruleville, Mississippi, as the "Fannie Lou Hamer United States Post Office".	Pub. L. 103–456, H.R. 4452, 108 Stat. 4798
103–457	November 2, 1994	(No short title)	To award a congressional gold medal to Rabbi Menachem Mendel Schneerson.	Pub. L. 103–457, H.R. 4497, 108 Stat. 4799
103–458	November 2, 1994	(No short title)	To designate the Post Office building located at 301 West Lexington in Independence, Missouri, as the "William J. Randall Post Office".	Pub. L. 103–458, H.R. 4551, 108 Stat. 4801
103–459	November 2, 1994	(No short title)	To designate the United States post office located at 103-104 Estate Richmond in Saint Croix, Virgin Islands, as the "Wilbert Armstrong United States Post Office".	Pub. L. 103–459, H.R. 4571, 108 Stat. 4802
103–460	November 2, 1994	(No short title)	To designate the building located at 4021 Laclede in St. Louis, Missouri, for the period of time during which it houses operations of the United States Postal Service, as the "Marian Oldham Post Office".	Pub. L. 103–460, H.R. 4595, 108 Stat. 4803
103–461	November 2, 1994	(No short title)	To direct the Secretary of the Interior to make technical corrections to maps relating to the Coastal Barrier Resources System.	Pub. L. 103–461, H.R. 4598, 108 Stat. 4804
103–462	November 2, 1994	(No short title)	Designating November of each year as "National American Indian Heritage Month".	Pub. L. 103–462, H.J.Res. 271, 108 Stat. 4805
103–463	(No short title)	Designating January 16, 1995, as "National Good Teen Day".	Pub. L. 103–463, H.J.Res. 326, 108 Stat. 4807	
103–464	November 9, 1994	(No short title)	Designating September 17, 1994, as "Constitution Day".	Pub. L. 103–464, H.J.Res. 390, 108 Stat. 4808
103–465	December 8, 1994	Uruguay Round Agreements Act	To approve and implement the trade agreements concluded in the Uruguay Round of multilateral trade negotiations.	Pub. L. 103–465, H.R. 5110, 108 Stat. 4809

== Private laws ==
The following 8 private laws were enacted during this Congress:

Private law number	Date of enactment	Official title	Link
103–1	August 3, 1993	For the relief of Olga D. Zhondetskaya.	Pvt. L. (text) (PDF), S. 1311
103–2	July 5, 1994	To validate conveyances of certain lands in the State of California that form part of the right-of-way granted by the United States to the Central Pacific Railway Company.	Pvt. L. (text) (PDF), H.R. 1183
103–3	August 1, 1994	For the relief of Melissa Johnson.	Pvt. L. (text) (PDF), H.R. 572
103–4	August 1, 1994	For the relief of Tania Gil Compton.	Pvt. L. (text) (PDF), S. 537
103–5	October 18, 1994	For the relief of Elizabeth M. Hill.	Pvt. L. (text) (PDF), H.R. 810
103–6	October 22, 1994	For the relief of Orlando Wayne Naraysingh.	Pvt. L. (text) (PDF), H.R. 2266
103–7	October 22, 1994	For the relief of Leteane Clement Monatsi.	Pvt. L. (text) (PDF), H.R. 2411
103–8	October 25, 1994	For the relief of James B. Stanley.	Pvt. L. (text) (PDF), H.R. 808

== Treaties ==
The following treaties were approved during this Congress:

Treaty document number	Date of ratification	Short title
Treaty 102-37	August 6, 1993	Treaty on Open Skies
Treaty 103-12	October 21, 1993	Investment Treaty with Kazakhstan
Treaty 103-2	November 17, 1993	Treaty with Argentina concerning the Reciprocal Encouragement and Protection of Investment
Treaty 103-3	November 17, 1993	Treaty with Bulgaria concerning the Encouragement and Preciprocal Protection of Investment
Treaty 103-11	November 17, 1993	Investment Treaty with the Republic of Armenia
Treaty 103-13	November 17, 1993	Investment Treaty with the Republic of Kyrgyzstan
Treaty 103-14	November 17, 1993	Investment Treaty with the Republic of Moldova
Treaty 103-15	November 17, 1993	Investment Treaty with the Republic of Ecuador
Treaty 102-36	November 17, 1993	Treaty with Romania concerning the Reciprocal Encouragement and Protection of Investment
Treaty 103-4	November 20, 1993	1992 Protocol to the 1966 Conservation of Atlantic Tunas Convention
Treaty 103-6	November 20, 1993	Tax Convention with the Netherlands
Treaty 103-7	November 20, 1993	Tax Convention with Mexico
Treaty 103-8	November 20, 1993	Convention on the Marking of Plastic Explosives for the Purpose of Detection
Treaty 103-9	November 20, 1993	Amendment to the Montreal Protocol on Substances That Deplete the Ozone Layer
Treaty 103-10	November 20, 1993	Convention on the Limitation Period in the International Sale of Goods, with Protocol
Treaty 103-17	November 20, 1993	Tax Convention with the Czech Republic
Treaty 103-18	November 20, 1993	Tax Convention with the Slovak Republic
Treaty 103-19	November 20, 1993	Protocol Amending the Tax Convention with the Kingdom of the Netherlands
Treaty 102-39	November 20, 1993	Income Tax Convention with the Russian Federation
Treaty 102-41	November 20, 1993	Protocol Amending the 1984 Income Tax Convention with Barbados
Treaty 103-22	May 17, 1994	Two Protocols Amending the OAS Charter
Treaty 95-18	June 24, 1994	International Convention on the Elimination of All Forms of Racial Discrimination
Treaty 103-16	September 23, 1994	Second Protocol Amending the 1975 Tax Convention with Israel
Treaty 103-23	October 7, 1994	Two Treaties with the United Kingdom Establishing Caribbean Maritime Boundaries
Treaty 103-24	October 7, 1994	Agreement to Promote Compliance with International Conservation and Management Measures by Fishing Vessels on the High Seas
Treaty 103-26	October 7, 1994	ILO Convention (No. 150) concerning Labor Administration
Treaty 103-27	October 7, 1994	Convention on the Conservation and Management of Pollock Resources in the Central Bering Sea
Treaty 102-40	October 7, 1994	Headquarters Agreement with the Organization of American States

== See also ==
- List of United States federal legislation
- Lists of acts of the United States Congress
