= District attorney =

US state prosecutor of criminal offenses

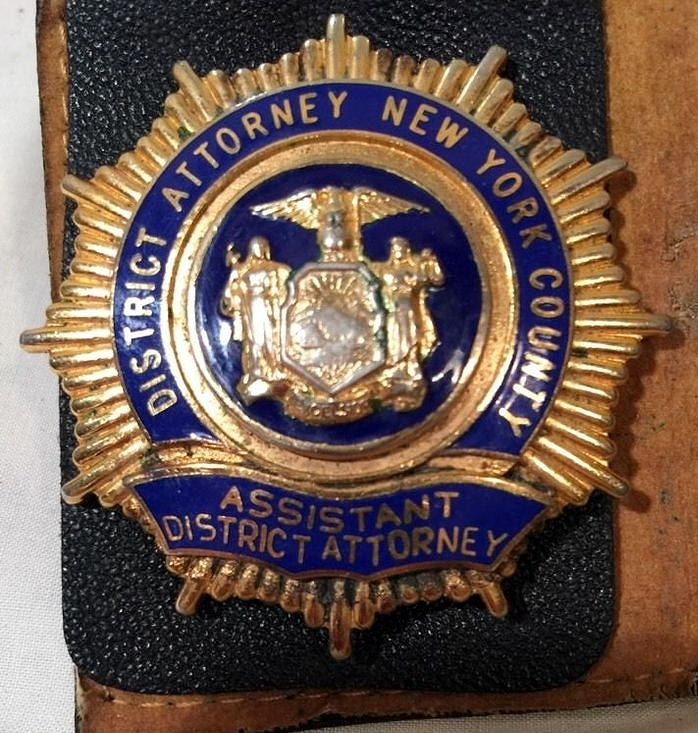
- Shield of an Assistant District Attorney (ADA) for New York County

Occupation
- Synonyms: County attorney, county prosecutor, state attorney, state's attorney, prosecuting attorney, commonwealth's attorney, solicitor
- Occupation type: Profession
- Activity sectors: Law practice, law enforcement, politics

Description
- Competencies: Advocacy skills, analytical mind, sense of justice, political fit
- Education required: Juris Doctor degree, bar exam
- Fields of employment: Government legal service
- Related jobs: Prosecutor, United States attorney

In the United States, a district attorney (DA), county attorney, county prosecutor, state attorney, state's attorney, prosecuting attorney, commonwealth's attorney, or solicitor is the chief prosecutor or chief law enforcement officer representing a U.S. state in a local government area, typically a county or a group of counties. The exact scope of the office varies by state. Generally, the prosecutor is said to represent the people of the jurisdiction in the state's courts, typically in criminal matters, against defendants. District attorneys are elected in almost all states, and the role is generally partisan. This is unlike similar roles in other common law jurisdictions, where chief prosecutors are appointed based on merit and expected to be politically independent.

The prosecution is the legal party responsible for presenting the case against an individual suspected of breaking the state's criminal law, initiating and directing further criminal investigations, guiding and recommending the sentencing of offenders, and are the only attorneys allowed to participate in grand jury proceedings. The prosecutors decide what criminal charges to bring, and when and where a person will answer to those charges. In carrying out their duties, prosecutors have the authority to investigate persons, grant immunity to witnesses and accused criminals, and plea bargain with defendants.

A district attorney or state attorney leads an office of other prosecutors and related staff. Staff attorneys are most commonly known as assistant district attorneys (ADAs) or deputy district attorneys (DDAs); in states where the head of office is called state attorney the staff attorneys are usually referred to as Assistant State Attorney (ASAs) Most prosecutions will be delegated to the assistant attorneys, with the head-of-office sometimes prosecuting the most important cases and having overall responsibility for the agency and its work. Most criminal matters in the United States are handled in state judicial systems, but a comparable office for the United States Federal government is the United States Attorney.

In most states, DAs are directly elected. They are appointed in Alaska, Connecticut, Delaware, and New Jersey. In the District of Columbia, the appointed United States Attorney is responsible for prosecuting most offenses under the DC Code, in addition to prosecuting federal offenses.

== History ==
This term for a prosecutor originates with the traditional use of the term "district" for multi-county prosecutorial jurisdictions in several U.S. states. For example, New York appointed prosecutors to multi-county districts prior to 1813. Even after those states broke up such districts and started appointing or electing prosecutors for individual counties, they continued to use the title "district attorney" for the most senior prosecutor in a county rather than switch to "county attorney".

== Role ==
The principal duties of the district attorney are usually mandated by law and include representing the State in all criminal trials for crimes which occurred in the district attorney's geographical jurisdiction. The geographical jurisdiction of a district attorney may be delineated by the boundaries of a county, judicial circuit, or judicial district.

Their duties generally include charging crimes through informations or grand jury indictments. After levying criminal charges, the state's attorney will then prosecute those charged with a crime. This includes conducting discovery, plea bargaining, and trial.

In some jurisdictions, the district attorney may act as chief counsel for city police, county police, state police and all state law enforcement agencies within the state's attorney's jurisdiction.

In some jurisdictions, the district attorney oversees the operations of local prosecutors with respect to violations of county ordinances. In other jurisdictions, the district attorney prosecutes traffic matters or misdemeanors. In some states the district attorney prosecutes violations of state laws to the extent that the state permits local prosecution of these. District attorneys do not prosecute federal crimes, which are the jurisdiction of a United States Attorney.

Many district attorneys also bear responsibilities not related to criminal prosecution. These include defending the county against civil suits, occasionally initiating such suits on behalf of the county, preparing or reviewing contracts entered into by the county and providing legal advice and counsel to local government. In some jurisdictions, the county attorney does not handle any criminal matters at all, but serves only as the legal counsel to the county.

For example, in Arizona, Missouri, Montana, and Minnesota a county attorney represents the county and state within their county, prosecutes all felonies occurring within the county, and prosecutes misdemeanors occurring within unincorporated areas of the county. Minnesota county attorneys also prosecute all juvenile cases, regardless of severity. In Ohio a county prosecutor represents the county and state within their county, prosecutes all crimes within the county, and is legal adviser to the board of county commissioners, board of elections, and all other county officers and boards. On the other hand, county attorneys in Kentucky and Virginia prosecute only certain misdemeanors and sometimes traffic matters and serve as legal counsel for their county, with felony prosecutions and prosecutions of offenses not handled by the county attorney being the responsibility of the commonwealth's attorney for the given county.

== Departments ==
The district attorney sometimes divides their services into several departments that handle different areas of criminal law. Each department is staffed by several duly appointed and sworn ASAs. The departments of a large district attorney's office may include but are not limited to: felony, misdemeanor, domestic violence, traffic, juvenile, charging (or case filing), drug prosecution, forfeitures, civil affairs such as eminent domain, child advocacy, child support, victim assistance, appeals, career criminal prosecution, homicide, investigations, organized crime/gang, and administration.

== Nomenclature ==
The name of the role of local prosecutor may vary by state or jurisdiction based on whether they serve a county or a multi-county district, the responsibility to represent the state or county in addition to prosecution, or local historical customs.

District attorney and assistant district attorney are the most common titles for state prosecutors, and are used by jurisdictions within the United States including California, Georgia, Massachusetts, Nevada, New Mexico, New York, North Carolina, Oklahoma, Oregon, Pennsylvania, Texas, and Wisconsin.

State's attorney or state attorney is used in Connecticut, Florida, Illinois, Maryland, North Dakota, South Dakota, and Vermont.

Commonwealth's attorney is used in Virginia and Kentucky. Kentucky splits the role between two officials—by statute, the commonwealth's attorney serves in the Circuit Court (the court of general jurisdiction), and the county attorney serves in the limited-jurisdiction District Court, although the two officials may enter into a written agreement to split their duties as they see fit. Commonwealth's attorneys are elected in their respective jurisdictions in both Virginia and Kentucky for terms of four years and six years, respectively. Kentucky's county attorneys are elected in their jurisdictions to four-year terms.

County attorney is used in Arizona, Missouri, Montana, Minnesota, New Hampshire, and Utah. (Note: District attorney is used in Salt Lake County) Note that in other states the county attorney may refer to a separate office with different responsibilities.

County prosecutor is used in New Jersey. This role differs from most other states as it is appointed rather than elected.

Solicitor, (Note: Not to be confused with a solicitor, a legal practitioner in many common-law jurisdictions outside of the U.S., or with a solicitor general, an advocate of a government.) or more fully a circuit solicitor, is the term South Carolina uses to refers to its prosecutors. One solicitor is elected for each of the state's 16 judicial circuits, consisting of two to five counties. Appointed assistants to a circuit solicitor are assistant solicitors.

Prosecuting attorney is used in Arkansas, Hawaii, Idaho, Indiana, Michigan, Missouri, (Note: Except in St. Louis, see below) Ohio, Washington, and West Virginia.

Circuit attorney is used in St. Louis, Missouri.

In Rhode Island and Delaware, criminal prosecutions are handled by the state attorney general. The title used for staff prosecutors is assistant attorney general in Rhode Island, and deputy attorney general in Delaware. In the District of Columbia, the local Attorney General handles youth cases and some adult misdemeanor offenses, while felonies and other misdemeanors are handled by the U.S. Attorney.

== Assistant district attorney ==
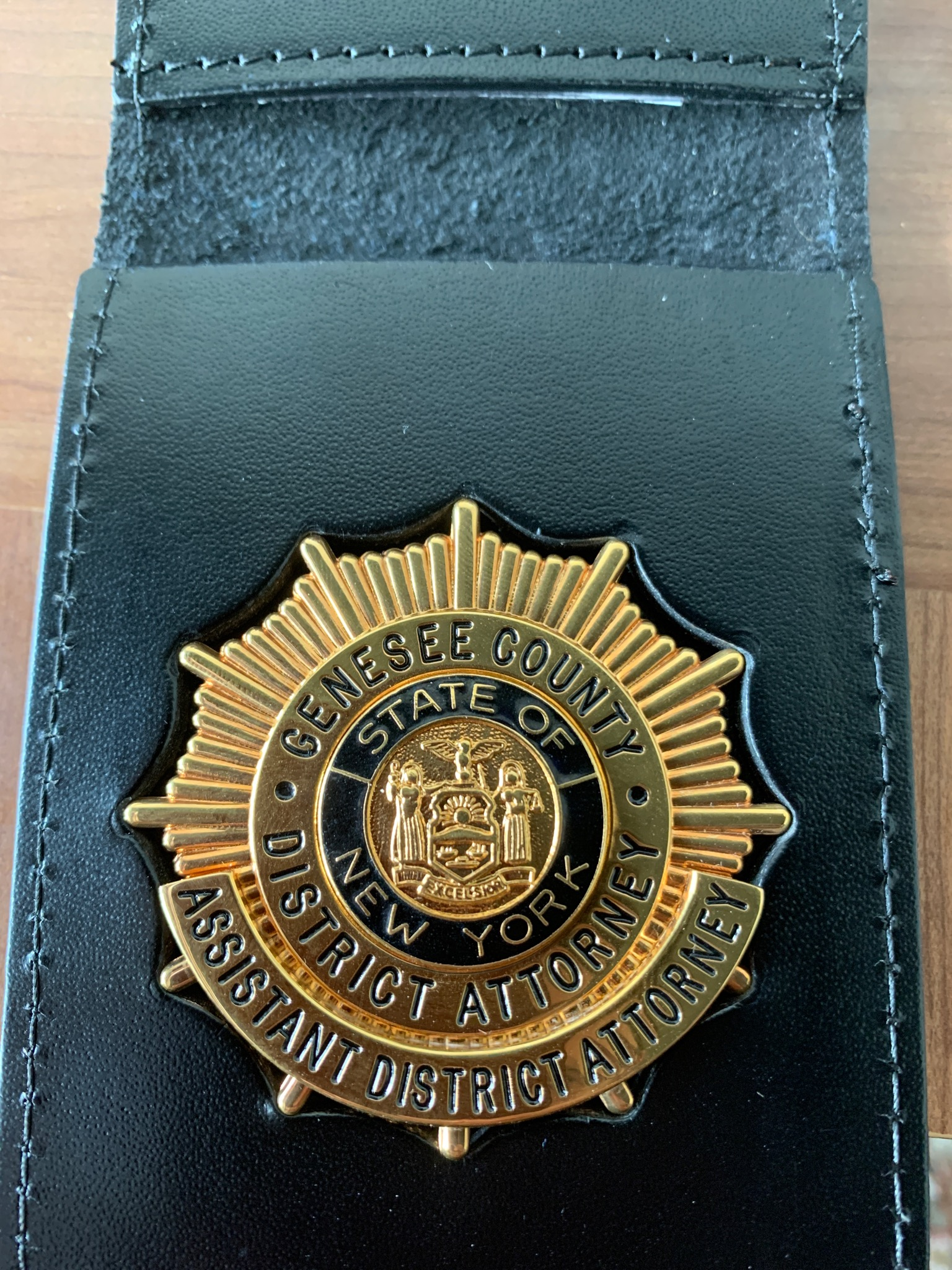
The badge of an Assistant District Attorney in Genesee County, New York

The assistant district attorney (assistant DA, ADA), or deputy district attorney (DDA), or state prosecutor, or assistant state's attorney (ASA), is a law enforcement official who represents the state government on behalf of the district attorney in investigating and prosecuting individuals alleged to have committed a crime. In carrying out their duties to enforce state and local laws, ADA have the authority to investigate persons, issue subpoenas, file formal criminal charges, plea bargain with defendants, and grant immunity to witnesses and accused criminals.

Administrative assistant district attorney (admin ADA), executive assistant district attorney (exec ADA), (Note: Not to be confused with an administrative assistant or executive assistant in the District Attorney's office (i.e. an office worker tasked with various menial duties)) chief assistant district attorney (chief ADA), and first assistant district attorney (First ADA) are some of the titles given to the senior ADA leadership working under the DA. The chief ADA, Executive ADA, or first ADA, depending on the office, is generally considered the second-in-command, and usually reports directly to the DA. The exact roles and job assignments for each title vary with each individual office, but generally include management of the daily activities and supervision of specialized divisions within the office. Often, a senior ADA may oversee or prosecute some of the larger crimes within the jurisdiction. In some offices, the Exec ADA has the responsibility of hiring lawyers and support staff, as well as supervising press-releases and overseeing the work of the office.

The salary of an ADA will be lower than the elected DA. The non-monetary benefits of the job induce many to work as an ADA; these include the opportunity to amass trial experience, perform a public service, and network professionally. Upon leaving employment as an ADA, persons seek employment as a judge, in private law firms, or as U.S. Attorneys.

== Appeals ==
Depending on state law, appeals are moved to appellate courts (also called appeals courts, courts of appeals, superior courts, or supreme courts in some states). During the appeals process district attorneys, in many cases, hands all relative prosecutorial materials to a state appellate prosecutor who in turn will represent the state in appellate courts with the advice and consent of the district attorney. In other cases, such as in New York, the District Attorney's Office will have in-house appellate prosecutors who handle appeals.

== District attorney investigators ==
Some district attorneys maintain their own law enforcement arm whose members are sworn peace officers. Depending on the jurisdiction, they are referred to as district attorney investigators or county detectives.

== Other countries ==
In England and Wales, the vast majority of criminal prosecutions are prosecuted by the Crown Prosecution Service. The CPS is headed by the Director of Public Prosecutions, who is appointed by the Attorney General for England and Wales. Within the CPS, 14 Chief Crown Prosecutors, answering to the DPP, head regional teams of Crown Prosecutors. With the exception of the AG and Solicitor General for England and Wales, no prosecutors are political officials in England and Wales and no prosecutor in England and Wales is a law enforcement official by virtue of their job.

In Canada, the equivalent position to a district attorney is a crown attorney, crown counsel or crown prosecutor depending on the province, and the equivalent to an assistant district attorney is the assistant crown attorney, assistant crown counsel or assistant crown prosecutor respectively. Some provinces appoint a Director of Public Prosecutions.

In India, the equivalent position to a District Attorney is typically called a "Public Prosecutor." Public Prosecutors represent the state in criminal cases and are responsible for prosecuting individuals accused of committing crimes. They work under the supervision of the Director of Prosecutions or the Advocate General at the state level, depending on the specific legal framework of the state.

== See also ==
- Law and order (politics)
- List of district attorneys by county
- Rule of law
