= Middle East Peace Facilitation Act of 1993 =

- Long title: An Act entitled the "Middle East Peace Facilitation Act of 1993".
- Enacted by: the 103rd United States Congress
- Effective: October 28, 1993

Citations
- Public law: Pub. L. 103–125
- Statutes at Large: 107 Stat. 1309

Legislative history
- Introduced in the Senate as S. 1487 by Claiborne Pell (D–RI) on September 23, 1993; Committee consideration by Senate Foreign Relations, House Foreign Affairs, House Banking, Finance, and Urban Affairs; Passed the Senate on September 29, 1993 (Passed Voice Vote); Passed the House on October 12, 1993 (Passed Voice Vote); Agreed to by the Senate on October 15, 1993 (Agreed Voice Vote); Signed into law by President William J. Clinton on October 28, 1993

Middle East Peace Facilitation Act of 1993 (P.L. 103-125, S.1487) was signed by President Bill Clinton on October 28, 1993, a month after the signing of the Oslo Accords, an agreement between Israel and the Palestinian Liberation Organization (PLO). In the act, the United States' Congress gave the President the conditional authority to lift sanctions against the PLO and ordered the U.S. State Department to monitor the PLO's compliance with the Accords. This was designed to provide aid funding to the Palestinians in hopes of promoting the Middle East Peace Process.

== History ==
For hundreds of years, the Middle East has been a hotbed of violent disagreement, extremist tactics and nearly continual upheaval. Discord between Jews and Muslims in the region containing their holiest of sites seems like a problem without a solution. In spite of this there have been a long series of attempted solutions to the problem of the Holy Land, from European powers, from the United Nations and eventually the United States. One of the earliest American solutions was the Middle East Peace Facilitation Act of 1993. An attempt to use the economic and financial might to promote the post-Oslo peace, the Act is a fascinating example of the American domestic policy process and how it can effect the nature of world events. Ultimately, the Peace Act would not save the fragile peace planted in the early 1990s, but it would create a precedent of American aid to both sides of the Israeli-Palestinian conflict which continues today.

== Original language ==
=== Context of the Middle East Peace Facilitation Act of 1993 ===
Middle East Peace Facilitation Act of 1993 was established as three sections endorsing United States presidential authority to suspend specified determinations of law confining foreign and United Nations assistance to the Palestine Liberation Organization.

Middle East Peace Facilitation Act of 1993 as short title - 107 Stat. 1309 § 1

Findings of 103rd Congress - 107 Stat. 1309 § 2

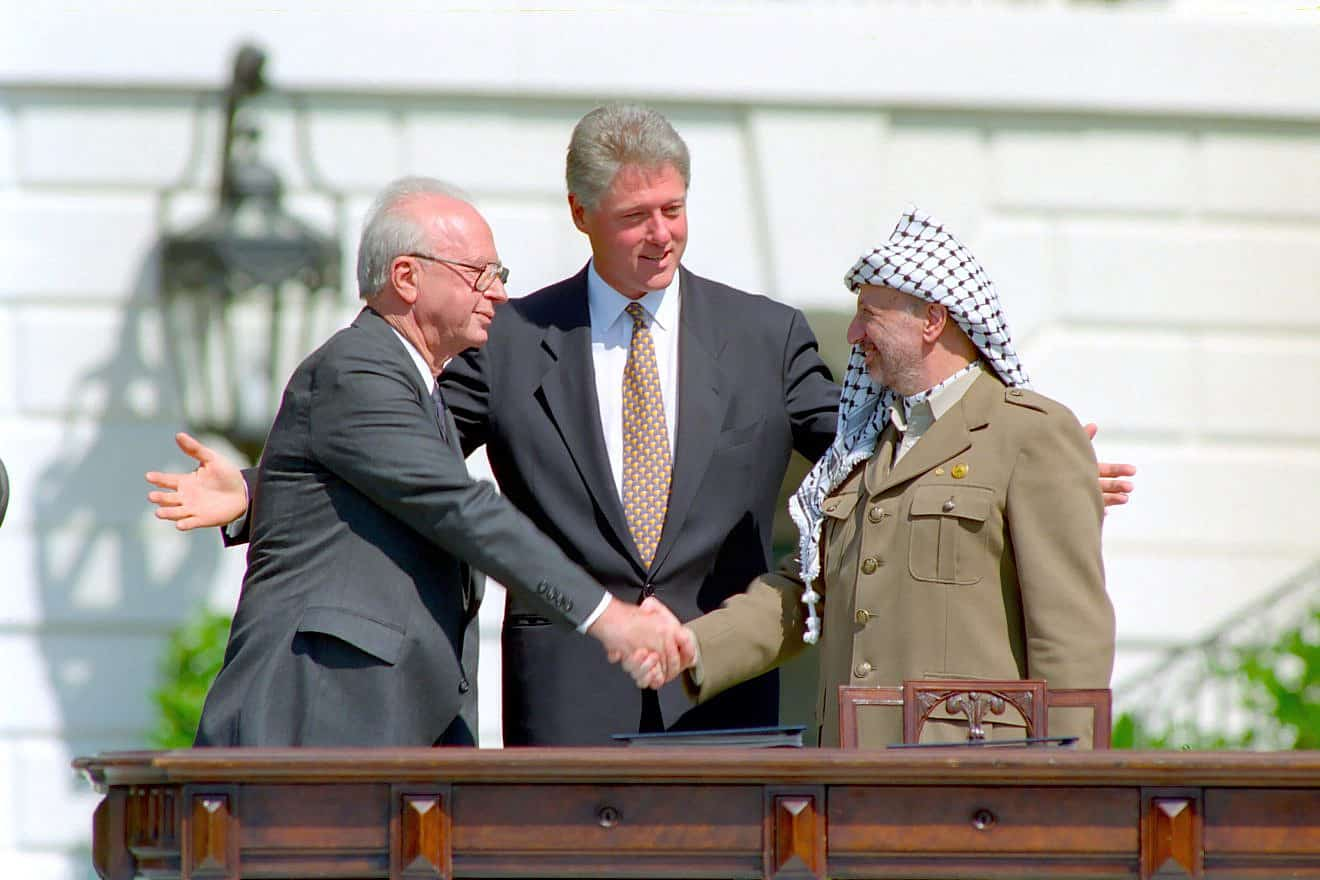
Israeli Prime Minister Yitzhak Rabin, U.S. President Bill Clinton, and Yasser Arafat at White House signing ceremony on September 13, 1993

- Palestine Liberation Organization has recognized the State of Israel's right to exist in peace and security;
- Accepted United Nations Security Council Resolution 242 and United Nations Security Council Resolution 338;
- Committed itself to the peace process and peaceful coexistence with Israel, free from violence and all other acts which endanger peace and stability;
- Assumed responsibility over all Palestine Liberation Organization elements find personnel in order to assure their compliance, prevent violations, and discipline violators
- Israel has recognized the Palestine Liberation Organization as the representative of the Palestinian people;
- Israel and the Palestine Liberation Organization signed a Declaration of Principles on Interim Self-Government Arrangements on September 13, 1993 ― Israel–Palestine Liberation Organization letters of recognition
- United States has resumed a bilateral dialogue with the Palestine Liberation Organization;
- Implementation of the Declaration of Principles on Interim Self-Government Arrangements and facilitate the Middle East peace process
- President of the United States requested flexibility to suspend certain provisions of law pertaining to the Palestine Liberation Organization

Authority to Suspend Certain Provisions - 107 Stat. 1309-1311 § 3

- Conditions

Consultation
Presidential Certification
Requirement for Continuing PLO Compliance
PLO Commitments Described

- Expectation of Congress Regarding any Extension of Presidential Authority

Reconciliation of Arab League boycott of Israel
Member states of the Arab League to end the boycotts of Israel
Cooperating with efforts undertaken by the President of the United States to end the Arab League boycott of Israel

- Provisions That May Be Suspended

Section 307 of the Foreign Assistance Act of 1961 (22 U.S.C. 2227)
Section 114 of the Department of State Authorization Act, Fiscal Years 1984 and 1985 (22 U.S.C. 287e note)
Section 1003 of the Foreign Relations Authorization Act, Fiscal Years 1988 and 1989 (22 U.S.C. 5202)
Section 37 of the Bretton Woods Agreement Act (22 U.S.C. 286w) ― Bretton Woods system

- Relation to Other Authorities
- Relevant Congressional Committees Defined

== Subsequent relevant legislation ==
U.S. Statutes subsequent to Middle East Peace Facilitation Act of 1993

Date of Enactment	Public Law No.	U.S. Statute	U.S. Bill No.	U.S. Presidential Administration
July 2, 1995	P.L. 104-17	109 Stat. 191	S. 962	William J. Clinton
August 14, 1995	P.L. 104-22	109 Stat. 260	H.R. 2161	William J. Clinton
September 30, 1995	P.L. 104-30	109 Stat. 277	H.R. 2404	William J. Clinton
November 13, 1995	P.L. 104-47	109 Stat. 423	H.R. 2589	William J. Clinton
February 12, 1996	P.L. 104-107	110 Stat. 755	S. 1064	William J. Clinton

== See also ==
- Palestinian law
