= Code of the District of Columbia =

Legal code for the District of Columbia, US

The Code of the District of Columbia is the codification of the general and permanent laws relating to the District of Columbia. It was enacted and is revised by authority of the Congress of the United States.

== History ==
Commissioners were appointed by virtue of "An act to improve the laws of the District of Columbia, and to codify the same," approved March 3, 1855. The commissioners were required "to revise, simplify, digest, and codify the laws of said District, and also the rules and principles of practice, pleadings, of evidence, and conveyancing."

An act of congress stated that "it is expedient that the laws of the District of Columbia should be arranged in appropriate titles, chapters and sections; that omissions and defects therein should be supplied and amended; and that the whole, rendered concise, plain, and intelligible, should be established and known as the Revised Code of the District of Columbia".

The laws which it was made their duty "to revise and simplify," consisted, in the language of the Maryland declaration of rights, of such of the English statutes as existed at the time of the first emigration to Maryland, and "which by experience have been found applicable to local and other circumstances, and of such others as have been since made in England or Great Britain, and have been introduced, used, and practiced by the courts of law and equity;" also of the declaration of rights, constitution, and statutes of Maryland, passed prior to the 27th day of February, 1801, as modified by the constitution and laws of the United States. The sources of law flowed from 3 distinct sources.

The law of March 3, 1855 required that the code should be approved by a majority of the board appointed to consider the same code. The members of that board certified to the President of the United States that they had considered its provisions and unanimously approved it. Pursuant to said law, the code was submitted to the people of the District for their consideration in November of 1857.

== Revision ==
By Act of Congress of July 30, 1947 (ch. 388, 61 Stat. 638), the Committee on the Judiciary of the House of Representatives is authorized to print bills to codify, revise, and reenact the general and permanent laws relating to the District of Columbia and cumulative supplements thereto, similar in style, respectively, to the Code of Laws of the United States, and supplements thereto, and to so continue until final enactment thereof in both Houses of the Congress of the United States.

== Criminal code ==
Division IV constitutes the district's criminal code. Congress codified the district's criminal statutes in 1901. By 2000, the code was considered obsolete, with a study in the Northwestern University Law Review ranking it 45th out of 52 state and federal criminal codes.

An independent D.C. Criminal Code Revision Commission formed in 2016 to consider revisions to the code, submitting its proposals to the D.C. Council in March 2021. The Council adopted many of the commission's recommendations in the Revised Criminal Code Act of 2022, overriding the veto of Mayor Muriel Bowser, who had expressed concerns about reducing some mandatory sentencing guidelines during a time of increasing crime rates in the city. A Republican-led United States House Committee on Oversight and Accountability introduced a bill to overturn the law before it would have taken effect. It was signed by President Joe Biden in March 2023, marking the first time a D.C. law had been completely overturned since 1991, when Congress prevented the district from relaxing building height restrictions.
