= Fireworks =

Low explosive pyrotechnic devices for entertainment

Fireworks

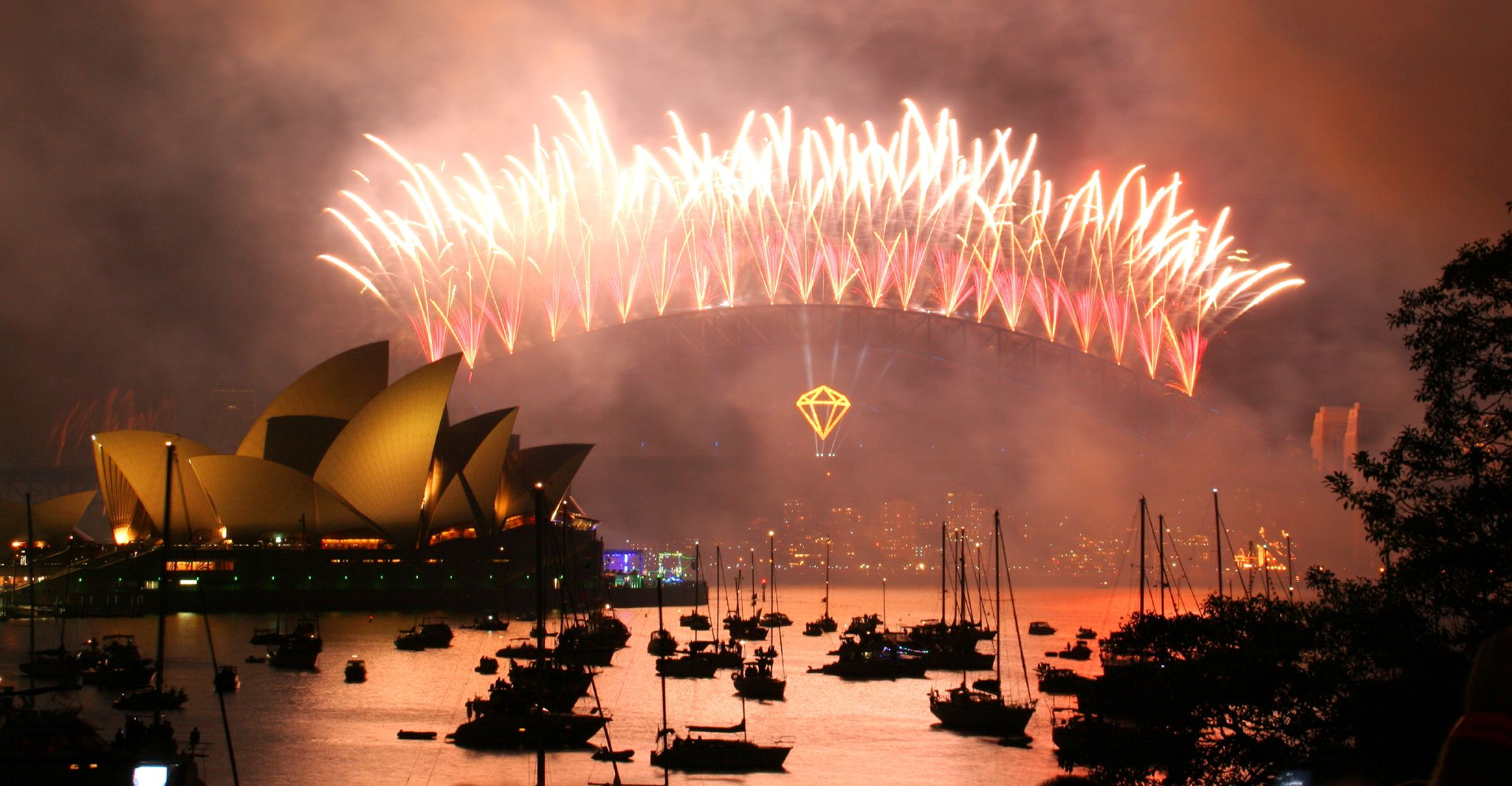
Fireworks over Sydney Harbour on New Year's Eve 2006–2007

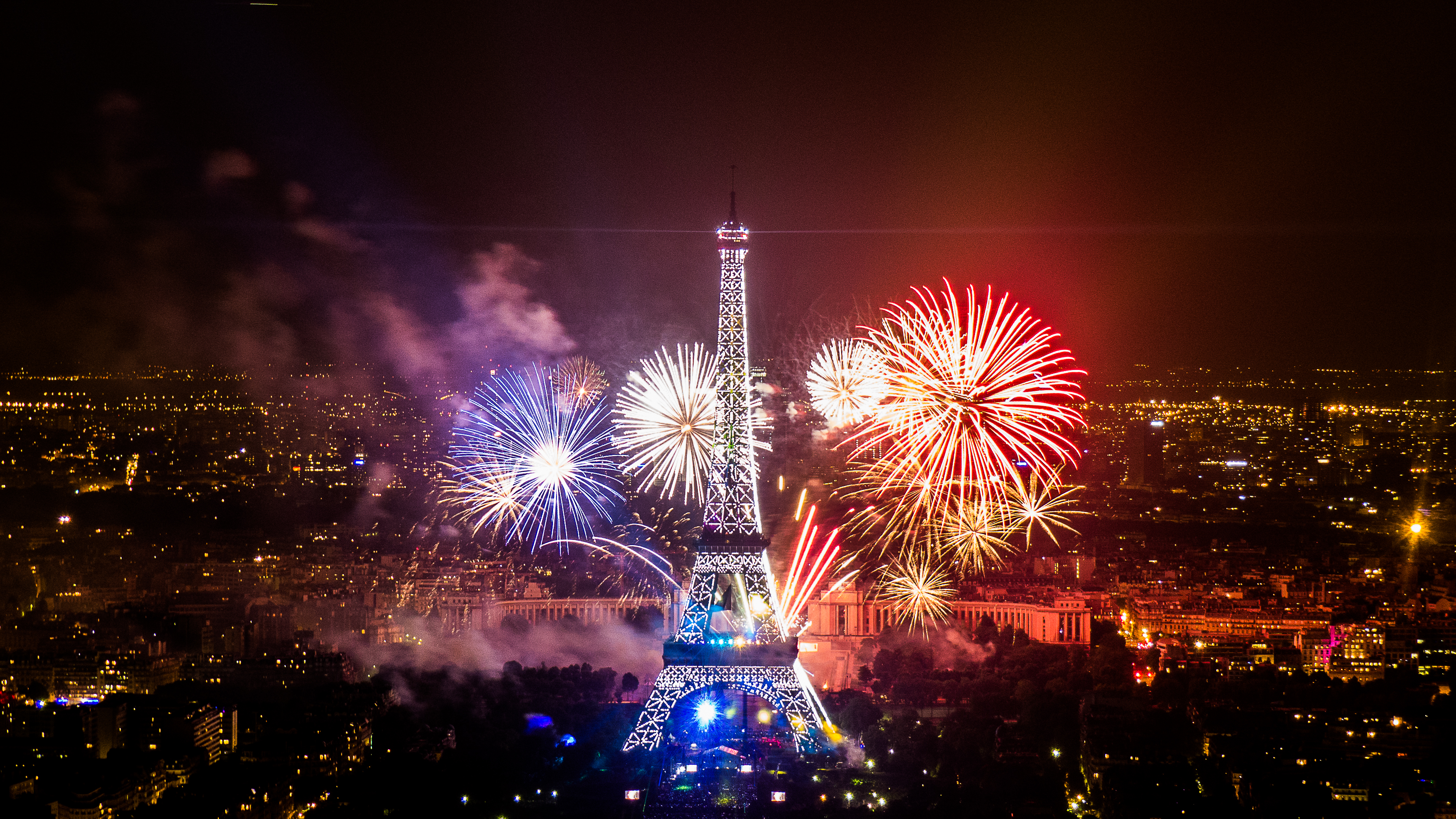
Bastille Day fireworks (2013) over Paris, traditionally accompanied by a musical show that starts with "La Marseillaise"

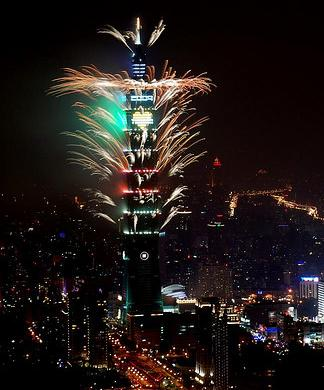
A fireworks display on Taipei 101, Taiwan, which in 2005 held the world's first fireworks display on a supertall skyscraper

Extra Large Wide Starmine at the Nagaoka Festival Fireworks 2015, Japan

Fireworks on the tallest building in the world, Burj Khalifa in Dubai

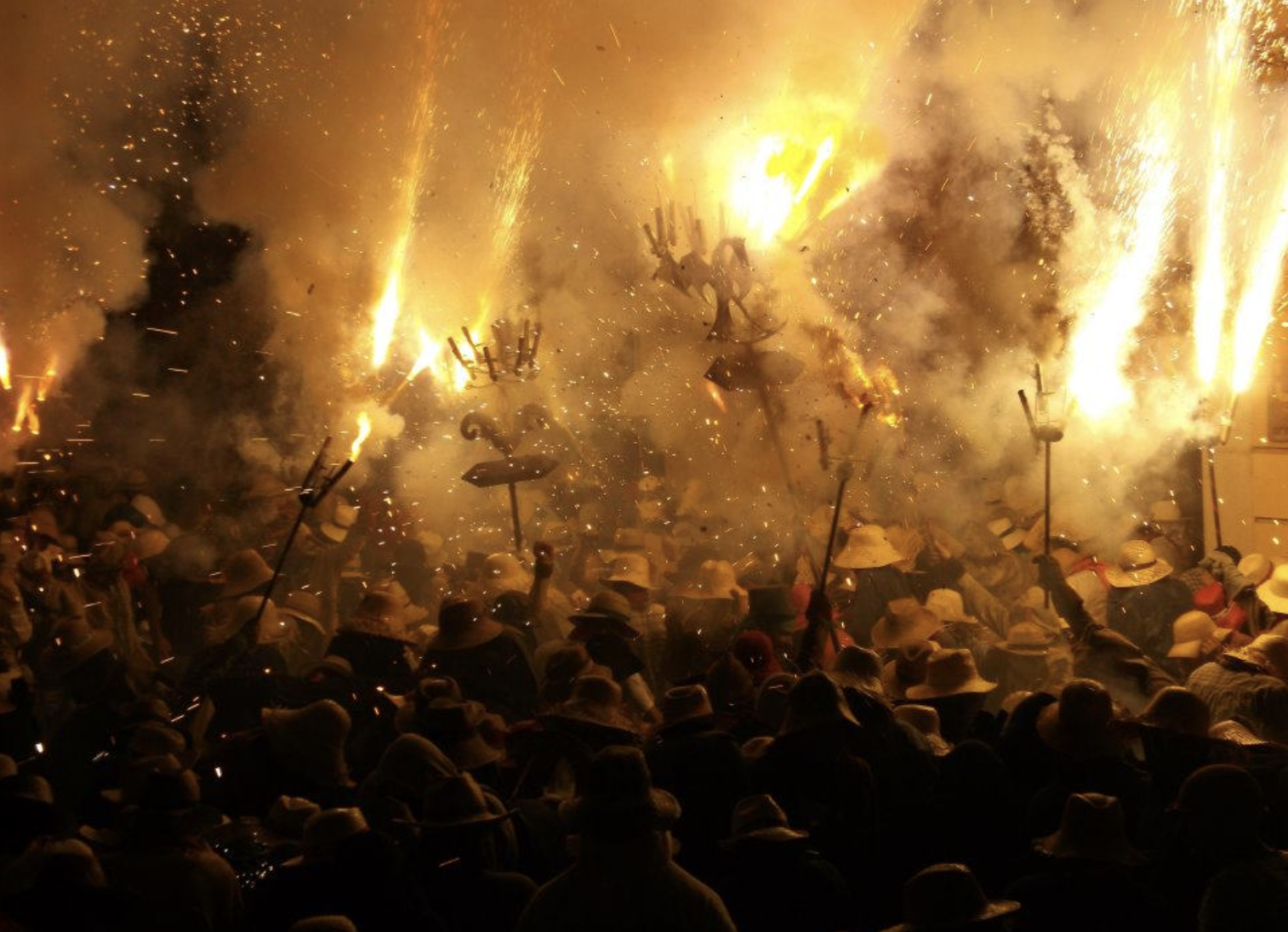
Ritual devils and townspeople participate in a Correfoc (firerun) at the culmination of Festa Major 2012, in Vilanova i la Geltrú

Fireworks are low explosive pyrotechnic devices used for aesthetic and entertainment purposes. They are most commonly used in fireworks displays (also called a fireworks show or pyrotechnics), combining a large number of devices in an outdoor setting. Such displays are the focal point of many cultural and religious celebrations, though mismanagement can lead to fireworks accidents.

Fireworks take many forms to produce four primary effects: noise, light, smoke, and floating materials (confetti most notably). They may be designed to burn with colored flames and sparks including red, orange, yellow, green, blue, purple and silver. They are generally classified by where they perform, either 'ground' or 'aerial'. Aerial fireworks may have their own propulsion (skyrocket) or be shot into the air by a mortar (aerial shell).

Most fireworks consist of a paper or pasteboard tube or casing filled with the combustible material, often pyrotechnic stars. A number of these tubes or cases may be combined so as to make when kindled, a great variety of sparkling shapes, often variously colored.

A skyrocket is a common form of firework, although the first skyrockets were used in warfare. The aerial shell, however, is the backbone of today's commercial aerial display, and a smaller version for consumer use is known as the festival ball in the United States.

Fireworks were originally invented in China. China remains the largest manufacturer and exporter of fireworks in the world.

== History ==
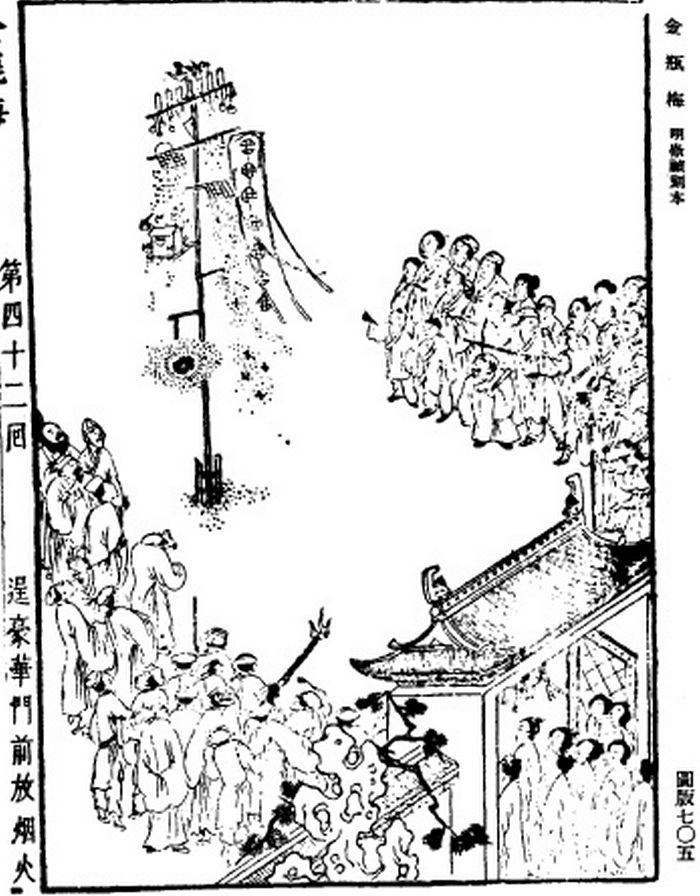
An illustration of a fireworks display from the 1628–1643 edition of the Ming Dynasty novel Jin Ping Mei

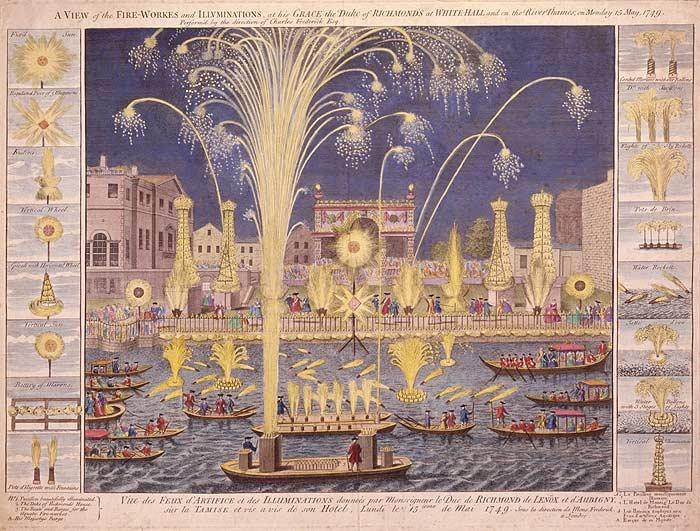
An etching of the Royal Fireworks display on the Thames, London, England, in 1749

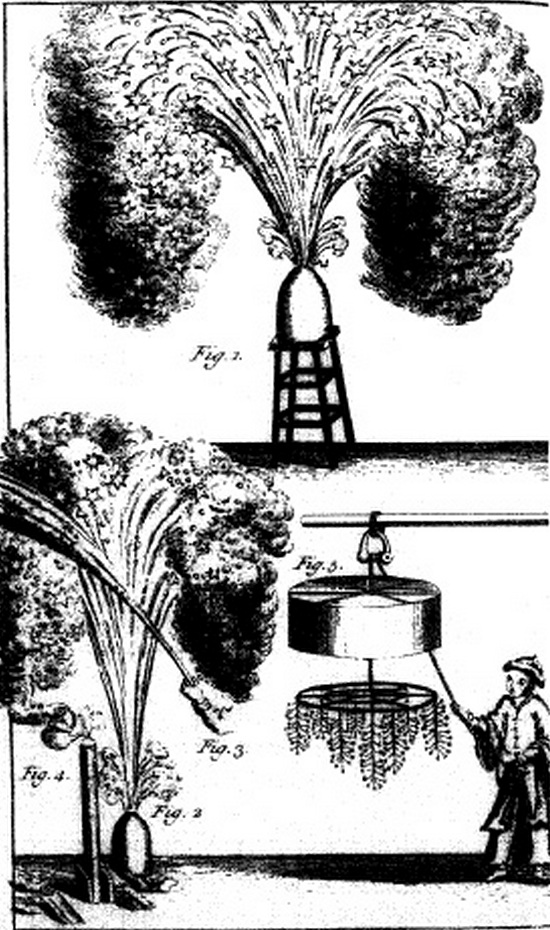
An 18th-century illustration of Chinese fireworks from an English abstract of an account of China by French Jesuit Pierre Nicolas d'Incarville

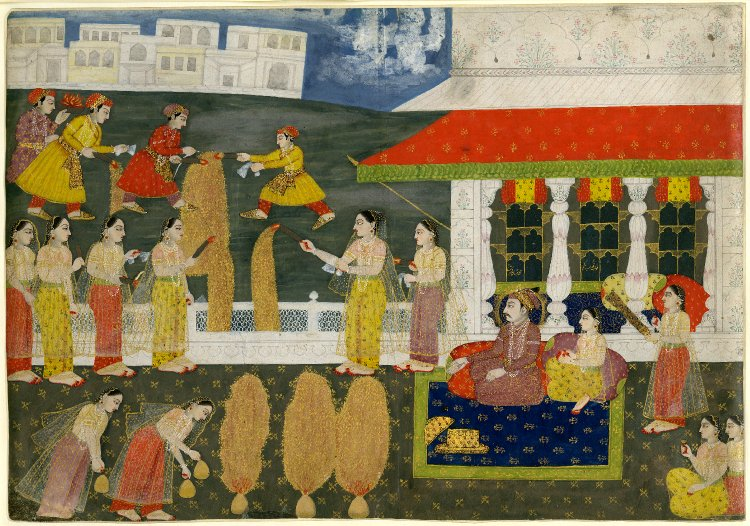
A firework display for Muḥammad Sháh, portrayed seated and leaning against a bolster

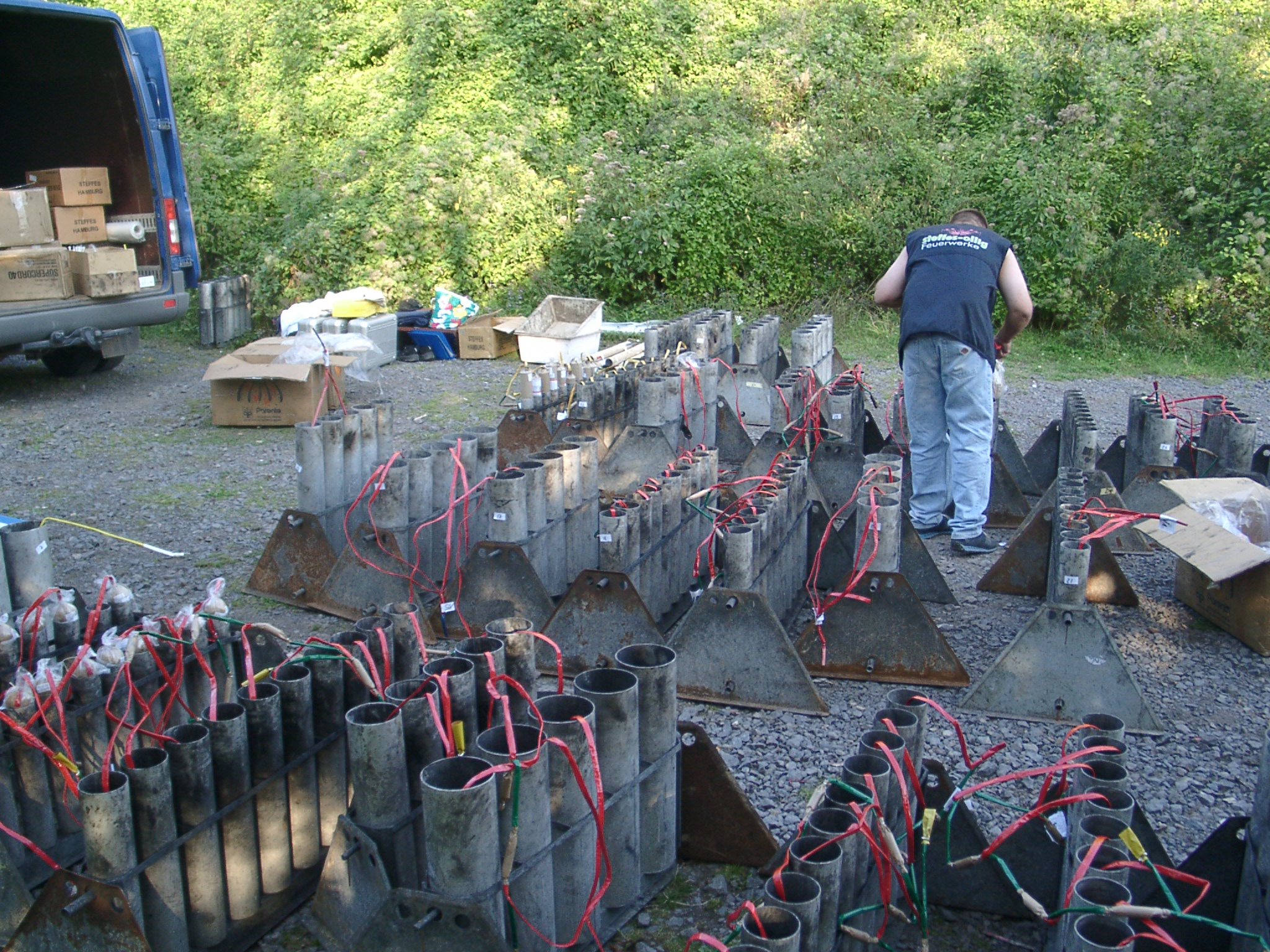
Preparing fireworks at Sayn Castle, Germany

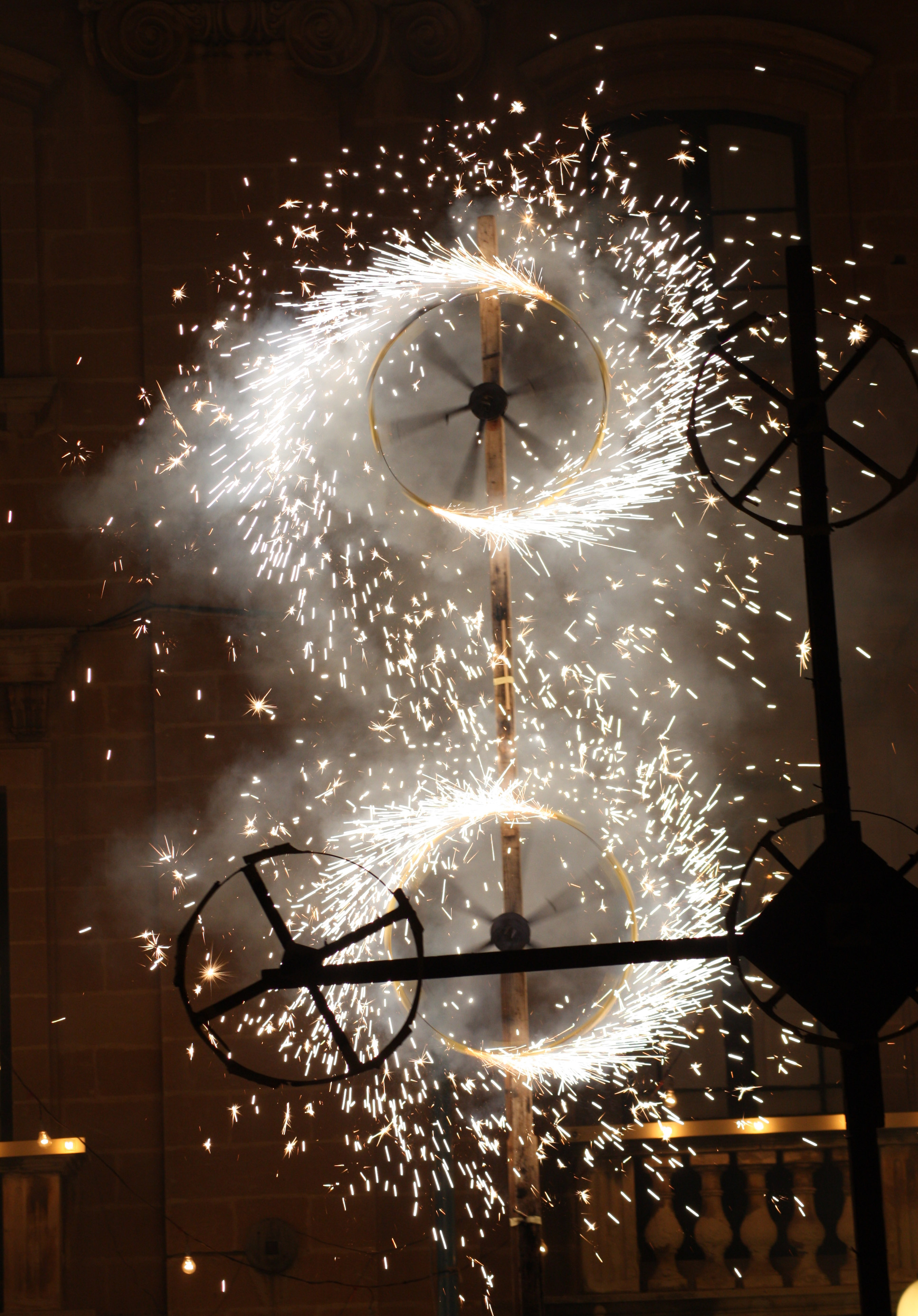
Two ignited Catherine wheels spinning during a traditional Maltese feast

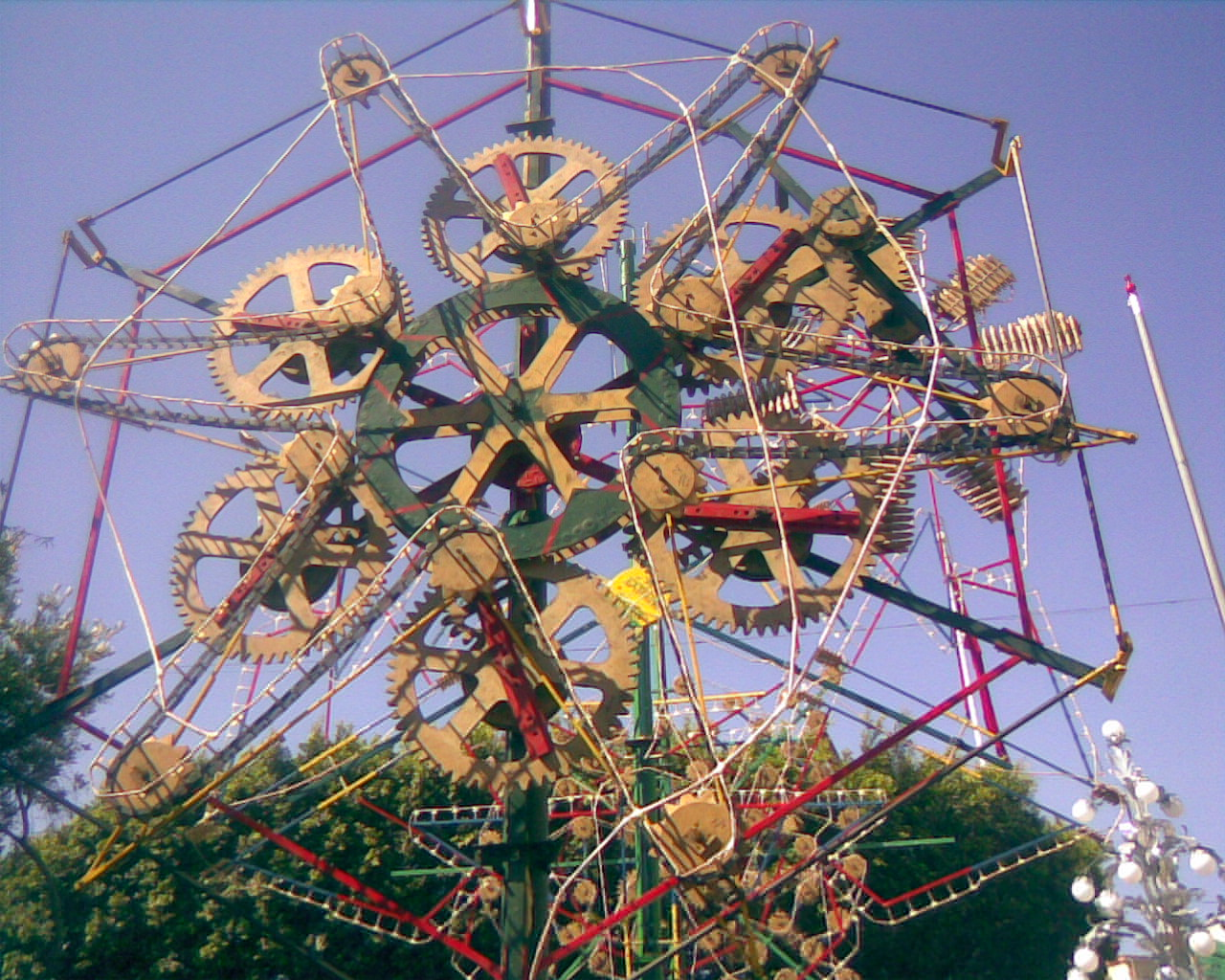
A ground firework showing various technical parts mentioned in the article, such as the chain and a set of gears

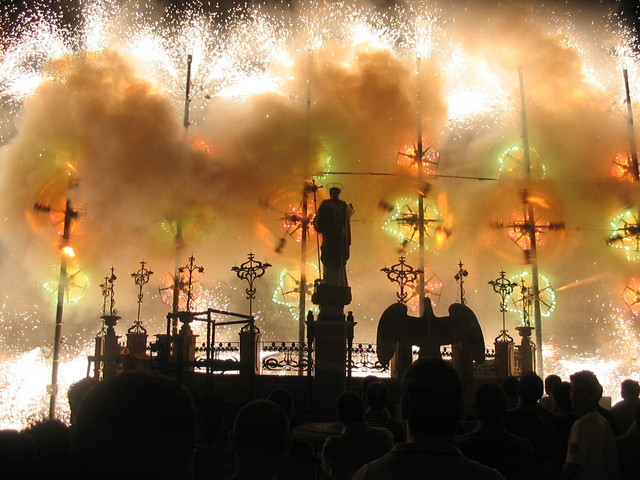
The grand finale showing also the jets that produce power. A picture taken from the back so the stars and flowers are not so clearly visible

The earliest fireworks came from China during the Song dynasty (960–1279). Fireworks were used to accompany many festivities. In China, pyrotechnicians were respected for their knowledge of complex techniques in creating fireworks and mounting firework displays.

During the Han dynasty (202 BC – 220 AD), people threw bamboo stems into a fire to produce an explosion with a loud sound. In later times, gunpowder packed into small containers was used to mimic the sounds of burning bamboo. Exploding bamboo stems and gunpowder firecrackers were interchangeably known as baozhu (爆竹) or baogan (爆竿). During the Song dynasty, people manufactured the first firecrackers comprising tubes made from rolled sheets of paper containing gunpowder and a fuse. They also strung these firecrackers together into large clusters, known as bian (lit. "whip") or bianpao (lit. "whip cannon"), so the firecrackers could be set off one by one in close sequence. By the 12th and possibly the 11th century, the term baozhang (爆仗) was used to specifically refer to gunpowder firecrackers. The first known usage of the term was in the Dreams of the Glories of the Eastern Capital (東京夢華錄; about 1148) by Meng Yuanlao.

During the Song dynasty, common folk could purchase fireworks such as firecrackers from market vendors. Grand displays of fireworks were also known to be held. For instance, according to the Dreams of the Glories of the Eastern Capital, a large fireworks display mounted by the military was held to entertain Emperor Huizong of Song (r. 1100–1125) in 1110. The Qidong Yeyu (齊東野語; 1264) states that a rocket-propelled firework called a dilaoshu (地老鼠; lit. "earth rat") went off near the Empress Dowager Gong Sheng and startled her during a feast held in her honor by her son Emperor Lizong of Song (r. 1224–1264). This type of firework was one of the earliest examples of rocket propulsion. Around 1280, a Syrian named Hasan al-Rammah wrote of rockets, fireworks, and other incendiaries, using terms that suggested he derived his knowledge from Chinese sources.

Colored fireworks were developed from earlier (possibly Han dynasty or soon thereafter) Chinese application of chemical substances to create colored smoke and fire. The Huolongjing (14th century) and Wubeizhi (preface of 1621, printed 1628) describe recipes, several of which used low-nitrate gunpowder, to create military signal smokes with various colors. In the Wubei Huolongjing (武備火龍經; Ming, completed after 1628), two formulas appear for firework-like signals, the sanzhangju (三丈菊) and baizhanglian (百丈蓮), that produce silver sparkles in the smoke. In the Huoxilüe (火戲略; 1753) by Zhao Xuemin (趙學敏), there are several recipes with low-nitrate gunpowder and other chemical substances to tint flames and smoke. These included, for instance, arsenical sulphide for yellow, copper acetate (verdigris) for green, lead carbonate for lilac-white, and mercurous chloride (calomel) for white. The Chinese pyrotechnics were described by the French author Antoine Caillot (1818): "It is certain that the variety of colours which the Chinese have the secret of giving to flame is the greatest mystery of their fireworks." Similarly, the English geographer Sir John Barrow (ca. 1797) wrote "The diversity of colours indeed with which the Chinese have the secret of cloathing fire seems to be the chief merit of their pyrotechny."

Fireworks were produced in Europe by the 14th century, becoming popular by the 17th century. Lev Izmailov, ambassador of Peter the Great, once reported from China: "They make such fireworks that no one in Europe has ever seen." In 1758, the Jesuit missionary Pierre Nicolas le Chéron d'Incarville, living in Beijing, wrote about the methods and composition of Chinese fireworks to the Paris Academy of Sciences, which published the account five years later. Amédée-François Frézier published his revised work Traité des feux d'artice pour le spectacle (Treatise on Fireworks) in 1747 (originally 1706).

In 1786, Bertholet discovered that oxidations with potassium chlorate resulted in a violet emission. Subsequent developments revealed that oxidations with the chlorates of barium, strontium, copper, and sodium result in intense emission of bright colors. The isolation of metallic magnesium and aluminium marked another breakthrough as these metals burn with an intense silvery light.

== Pyrotechnic compounds ==
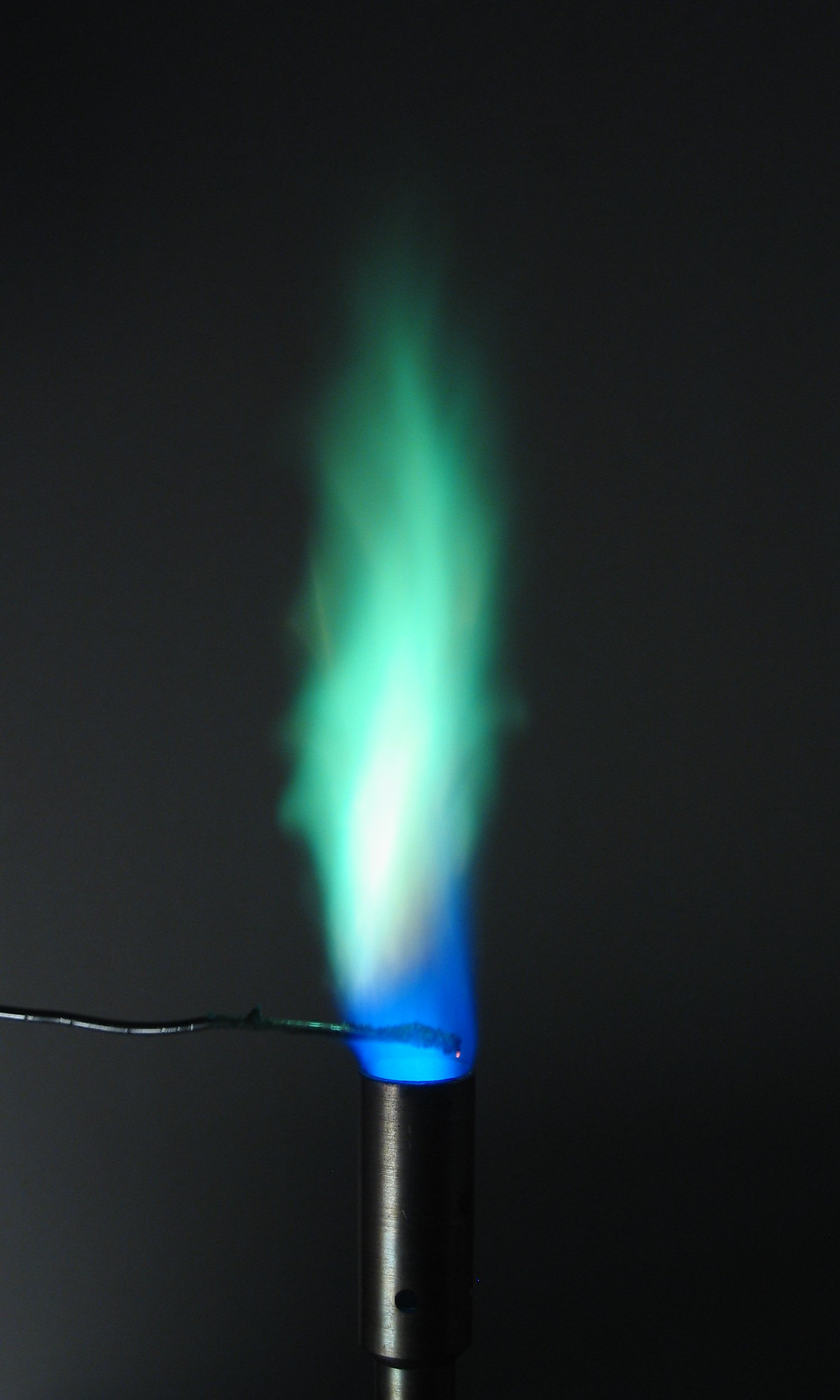
Copper compounds glow green or blue-green in a flame.

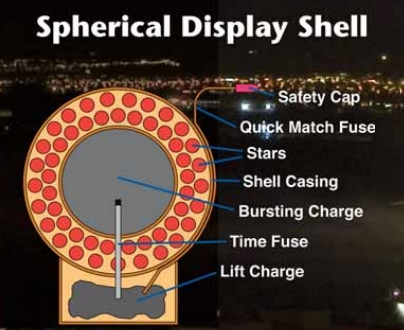
Fireworks shell

Colors in fireworks are usually generated by pyrotechnic stars—usually just called stars—which produce intense light when ignited. Stars contain four basic types of ingredients.

- A fuel
- An oxidizer—a compound that combines with the fuel to produce intense heat
- Color-producing salts (when the fuel itself is not the colorant)
- A binder which holds the pellet together.

Some of the more common color-producing compounds are tabulated here. The color of a compound in a firework will be the same as its color in a flame test (shown at right). Not all compounds that produce a colored flame are appropriate for coloring fireworks, however. Ideal colorants will produce a pure, intense color when present in moderate concentration.

The color of sparks is limited to red/orange, yellow/gold and white/silver. This is explained by light emission from an incandescent solid particle in contrast to the element-specific emission from the vapor phase of a flame. Light emitted from a solid particle is defined by black-body radiation. Low boiling metals can form sparks with an intensively colored glowing shell surrounding the basic particle. This is caused by vapor phase combustion of the metal.

Color	Metal	Example compounds
Red	Strontium (intense red) Lithium (medium red)	SrCO_{3} (strontium carbonate) Li_{2}CO_{3} (lithium carbonate) LiCl (lithium chloride)
Orange	Calcium	CaCl_{2} (calcium chloride)
Yellow	Sodium	NaNO_{3} (sodium nitrate)
Green	Barium	BaCl_{2} (barium chloride)
Blue	Copper halides	CuCl_{2} (copper(II) chloride), at low temperature
Indigo	Caesium	CsNO_{3} (caesium nitrate)
Violet	Potassium Rubidium (violet-red)	KNO_{3} (potassium nitrate) RbNO_{3} (rubidium nitrate)
Gold	Charcoal, iron, or lampblack	
White	Titanium, aluminium, or magnesium powders	

The brightest stars, often called Mag Stars, are fueled by aluminium. Magnesium is rarely used in the fireworks industry due to its lack of ability to form a protective oxide layer. Often an alloy of both metals called magnalium is used.

Many of the chemicals used in the manufacture of fireworks are non-toxic, while many more have some degree of toxicity, can cause skin sensitivity, or exist in dust form and are thereby inhalation hazards. Still others are poisons if directly ingested or inhaled.

=== Common elements in pyrotechnics ===
The following table lists the principal elements used in modern pyrotechnics. Some elements are used in their elemental form such as particles of titanium, aluminium, iron, zirconium, and magnesium. These elements burn in the presence of air (O2) or oxidants (perchlorate, chlorate). Most elements in pyrotechnics are in the form of salts.

Symbol	Name	Fireworks usage
Al	Aluminium	Aluminium metal is used to produce silver and white flames and sparks. It is a common component of sparklers.
Ba	Barium	Barium salts are used to create green colors in fireworks, and it can also help stabilize other volatile elements.
C	Carbon	Carbon is one of the main components of black powder, which is used as a propellent in fireworks. Carbon provides the fuel for a firework. Common forms include carbon black, sugar, or starch.
Cl	Chlorine	Chlorate and perchlorates are common oxidizers.
Cu	Copper	Copper compounds produce blue colors.
Fe	Iron	Iron powder is used to produce sparks in sparklers.
K	Potassium	Potassium nitrate, potassium chlorate, and potassium perchlorate are common oxidizers. The potassium content imparts a faint violet color to the sparks.
Mg	Magnesium	Magnesium metal burns a very bright white, so it is used to add white sparks or improve the overall brilliance of a firework.
Na	Sodium	Sodium imparts a gold or yellow color to fireworks; however, the color is often so bright that it frequently masks other, less intense colors. Sodium lamps operate with the same optical emission.
O	Oxygen	Oxygen is a component of chlorate and perchlorate, common oxidizers.
S	Sulfur	Sulfur is a component of black powder, and as such, it is found in a propellant/fuel.
Sr	Strontium	Strontium salts impart a red color.
Ti	Titanium	Titanium metal can be burned as powder or flakes to produce silver sparks.
Zr	Zirconium	Zirconium, like titanium, burns to produce oxides that emit brightly. It is used in "waterfalls".

== Types ==
=== Aerial fireworks ===
Aerial fireworks are fireworks that typically have their effects launched mostly upward initially and to a significant height.

==== Aerial shell ====
An aerial fireworks shell is a shell that contains pyrotechnic compounds and is shot upwards by a mortar and explodes high in the sky to give out visual effects. Aerial fireworks shells are typically used in public display.

Airbomb

==== Cake ====
A cake is a cluster of individual tubes linked by fuse that fires a series of aerial shell effects upward. Tube diameters can range in size from 1/4–4 inches (6.4–101.6 mm), and a single cake can have more than 1,000 shots. The variety of effects within individual cakes is often such that they defy descriptive titles and are instead given cryptic names such as "Bermuda Triangle", "Pyro Glyphics", "Waco Wakeup", and "Poisonous Spider", to name a few. Others are simply quantities of 2.5–4 in (64–102 mm) shells fused together in single-shot tubes.

==== Fountain ====
- Catherine wheel
- Gerb
- Iron flower
- Saxon
- Tezutsu-hanabi
- Tubri

==== Mine ====
A mine (a.k.a. pot à feu) is a firework that expels stars and/or other garnitures into the sky. Shot from a mortar like a shell, a mine consists of a canister with the lift charge on the bottom with the effects placed on top. Mines can project small reports, serpents, and small shells, as well as just stars. Although mines up to 12 inches (305 mm) diameter appear on occasion, they are usually 3–5 inches (76–127 mm) in diameter.

==== Rocket ====
- Skyrocket

==== Roman candle ====
A Roman candle is a long tube containing several large stars which fire at a regular interval. These are commonly arranged in fan shapes or crisscrossing shapes, at a closer proximity to the audience. Some larger Roman candles contain small shells (bombettes) rather than stars.

==== Sky shot ====
A sky shot is a tube that fires one or more aerial shell effects upward. Sky shots are mostly used and bought during Kali Puja and Diwali in India. Sky shots are divided into shell fireworks, which have a single explosion in the sky, and shot fireworks, which have multiple explosions and displays by firing automated shell shots. In October 2025, the Supreme Court of India lifted the absolute ban on all firecrackers to be used during Diwali and allowed green (eco-friendly) firecrackers to be used between 8 and 10 PM during Diwali. Sky shots like other commercial fireworks remained banned and regulated.

=== Ground fireworks ===
Ground fireworks are fireworks that does not typically have their effects launched mostly upward initially.

==== Cannon ====
- Bamboo cannon
- Big-Bang Cannon
- Rock cannon

==== Firecracker ====
- Cherry bomb
- Chocolate bomb
- Judas's belt
- M-80
- M-100
- Piccolo
- Quarter stick
- Super Yolanda
- Sutli bomb

==== Sparkler ====
- Senko hanabi
- Watusi

==== Spinner ====
A spinner is a small device that when ignited, gives off sparks and spins for some time like a spinning top. The pyrotechnic composition is placed in a way that causes the spinning and visible sparks.

== Aerial shell visual effects ==
=== Peony ===
A spherical break of colored stars that burn without a tail, with relatively plentiful and small stars that travel a relatively short distance from the shell break before burning out. The peony is the most commonly seen shell type.

==== Diadem ====
A type of peony, with a center cluster of non-moving stars, normally of a contrasting color or effect.

=== Dahlia ===
A spherical break of colored stars that burn without a tail, with relatively few and large stars that travel a relatively long distance from the shell break before burning out. For instance, if a 3 in (76 mm) peony shell is made with a star size designed for a 6 in (152 mm) peony shell, it is then considered a dahlia. Some dahlia shells are cylindrical rather than spherical to allow for larger stars.

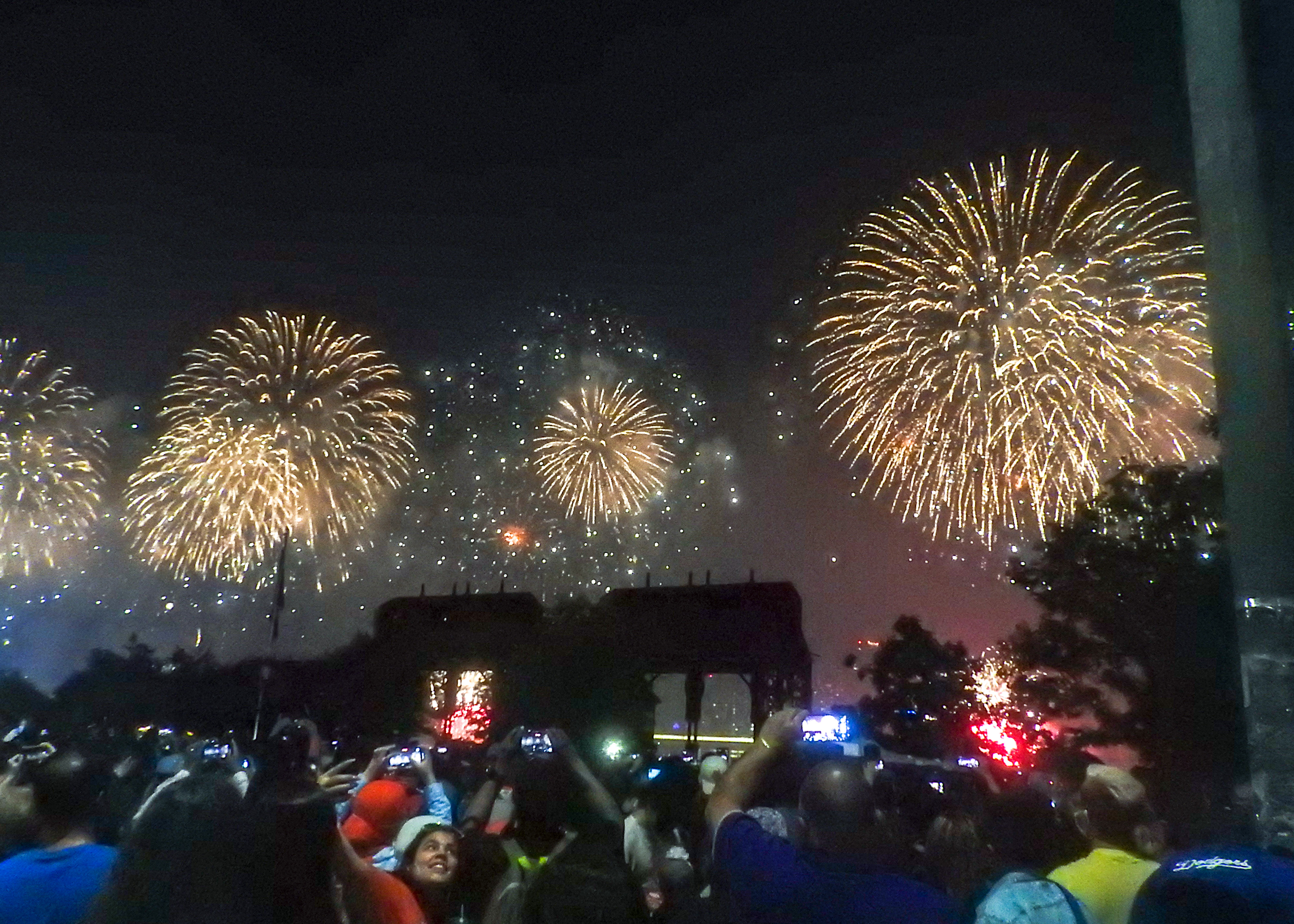
Chrysanthemum shells in New York

=== Chrysanthemum ===
A spherical break of colored stars that leave a visible trail of sparks.

==== Willow ====
A type of chrysanthemum, with long-burning silver or gold stars that produce a soft, dome-shaped weeping willow-like effect.

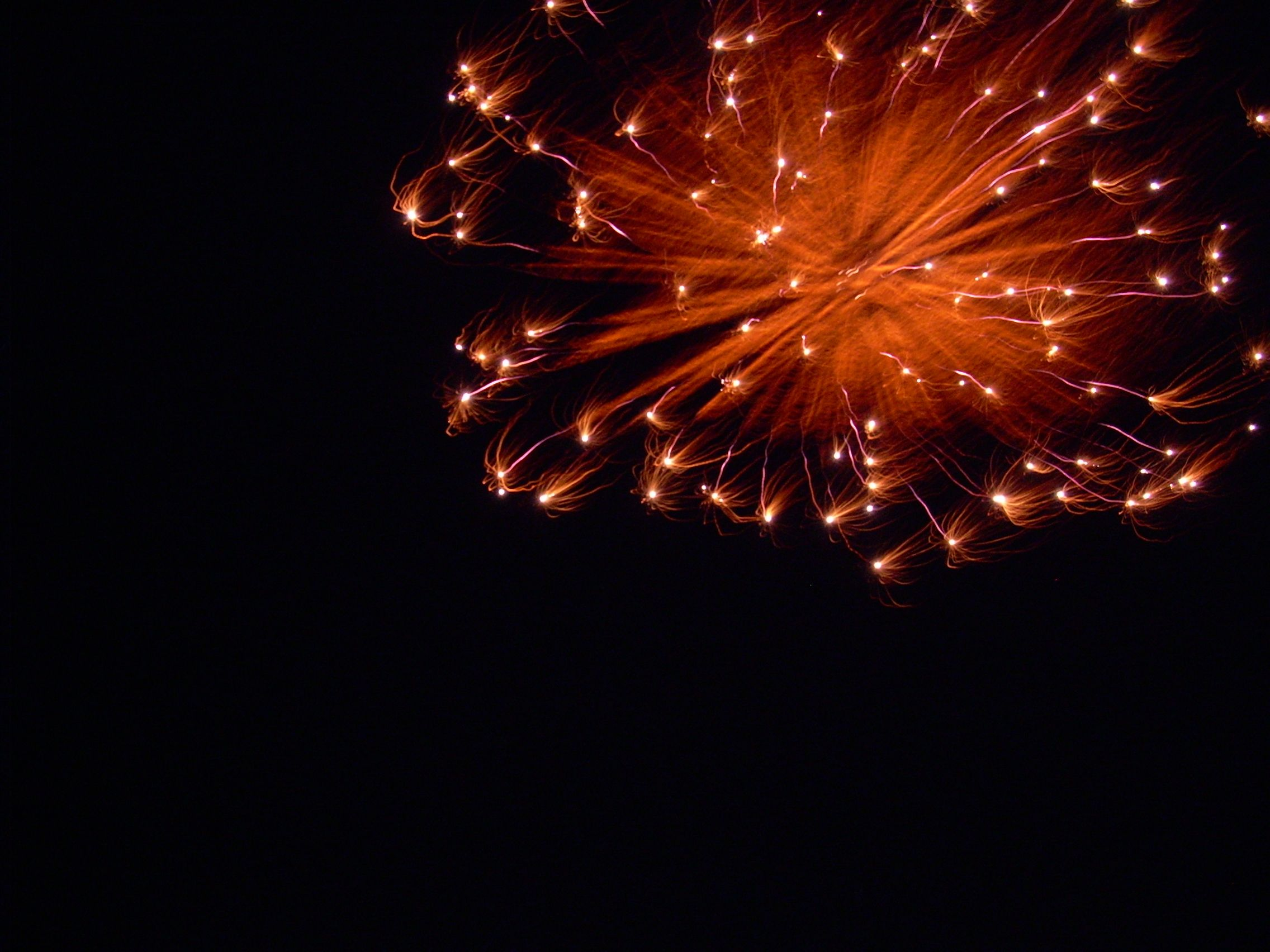
A typical kamuro effect

==== Kamuro ====
A type of chrysanthemum, with a dense burst of glittering silver or gold stars which leave a heavy glitter trail and shine bright in the night sky. It is named after kamuro (冠), a Japanese word meaning "boys haircut", which is what this effect resembles after the shell fully explodes in the air.

=== Crossette ===
A break of several large stars that travel a short distance before breaking apart into smaller stars, creating a crisscrossing grid-like effect. Strictly speaking, a crossette star should split into four pieces which fly off symmetrically, making a cross. Once limited to silver or gold effects, colored crossettes such as red, green, or white are now very common.

=== Fish ===
A break of several stars that propel themselves rapidly away from the shell burst. It often resembles fish swimming away.

=== Horsetail ===
A directional break with heavy long-burning tailed stars that only travel a short distance from the shell burst before free-falling to the ground, also known as a waterfall shell. It is named for the shape of its break. There may be a glittering while the stars are in free fall.

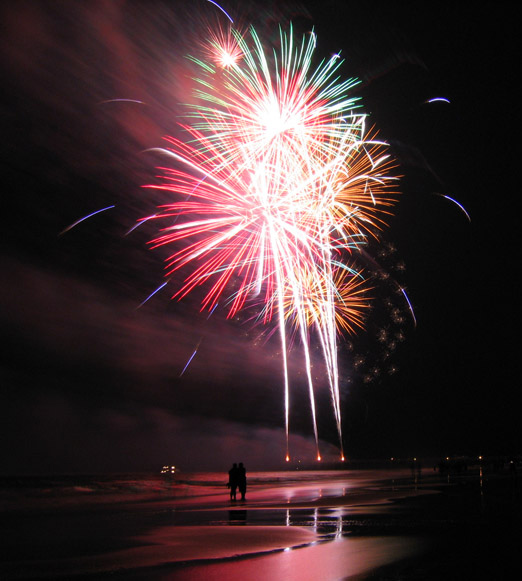
A collection of palm-shell fireworks illuminating the beach of Tybee Island, Georgia, United States

=== Palm ===
A break of relatively few large comet stars bursting with large arms or tendrils, with a thick rising tail that displays as the shell ascends, producing a palm tree-like effect. The illuminating rising tail simulate the tree trunk. There may be a burst of color inside the palm burst (given by a small insert shell) to simulate coconuts.

=== Ring ===
A circular break of stars that create a ring. Variations include smiley faces, hearts, and clovers.

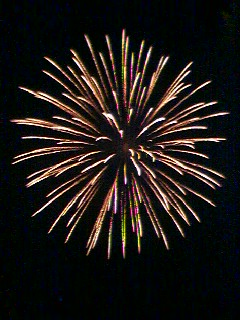
A typical spider effect

=== Spider ===
A break of a fast burning tailed or charcoal stars that travel in almost a straight and flat trajectory before slightly falling and burning out. This appears in the sky as a series of radial lines much like the legs of a spider.

=== Time rain ===
A break of large, slow-burning stars that leave a trail of large glittering sparks behind and make a sizzling noise. The "time" refers to the fact that these stars burn away gradually, as opposed to the standard brocade "rain" effect where a large amount of glitter material is released at once.

=== Farfalle ===
A break with spinning silver sprays in the air. It is an effect in Italian fireworks.

=== Tourbillon ===
A break with spinning stars sprays in the air.

=== Salute (visual) ===
A break of flash powder, producing a quick flash. Titanium may be added to the flash powder mix to produce a cloud of bright sparks around the flash.

A salute shell is intended to produce a loud report rather than a visual effect. A salute may not include a visual effect, but usually flash powder is added into the shell to produce a flash. The flash is followed by a very loud report resembling military artillery. Salutes are commonly used in large quantities during finales to create intense noise and brightness. They are often cylindrical in shape to allow for a larger payload of flash powder, but ball shapes are common and cheaper as well. Salutes are also called Maroons.

=== Multi-break shells ===
A large shell containing several smaller shells of various sizes and types. The initial burst scatters the shells across the sky before they explode. Also called a bouquet shell. When a shell contains smaller shells of the same size and type, the effect is usually referred to as "Thousands". Very large bouquet shells (up to 48 inches [1,219 mm]) are frequently used in Japan.

== Audio effects ==
=== Bang ===
A bang sounds like artillery cannon being fired. It is the most common effect in fireworks. Technically, it is a general term for two effects, "report" and "salute". The "salute" effect is more pronounced than the "report" effect and sometimes is banned.

=== Crackle ===
A crackle is an intermittent popping or clicking sound (crackling sound).

=== Hummer ===
A hummer sounds like a short celebratory yell. It is created by tiny tube fireworks that are ejected into the air spinning with such force that they shred their outer coating, in doing so they whizz and hum.

=== Whistle ===
A whistle is a high pitched and often very loud screaming and screeching. It is created by the resonance of gas caused by a very fast strobing (on/off burning stage) of the fuel. The rapid bursts of gas from the fuel vibrate the air many hundreds of times per second causing the familiar whistling sound. It is not, as is commonly thought, made in the conventional way that musical instruments are using specific tube shapes or apertures. Common whistle fuels contain benzoate or salicylate compounds and a suitable oxidizer such as potassium perchlorate.

== Safety and environmental impact ==
An episode of About Safety, a 1970s educational children's show, which reveals the hazards of improper firework usage

Improper use of fireworks is dangerous, both to the person operating them (risks of burns and wounds) and to bystanders; in addition, they may start fires on landing. To prevent fireworks accidents, the use of fireworks is legally restricted in many countries. In such countries, display fireworks are restricted for use by professionals; smaller consumer versions may or may not be available to the public.

=== Effects on animals ===
Birds and animals, both domestic and wild, can be frightened by their noise, leading to them running away, often into danger, or hurting themselves on fences or in other ways in an attempt to escape the perceived danger.

The majority of dogs experience distress, fear and anxiety from fireworks. In 2016, following a petition signed by more than 100,000 Britons, the House of Commons of the United Kingdom debated a motion to restrict firework use.

Fireworks also affect birds, especially larger birds such as geese and eagles. According to a study by Max Planck Institute and Netherlands Institute of Ecology, many birds abruptly leave their sleeping sites on New Year's Eve, and some fly up to 500 km non-stop to get away from human settlements. On average, about 1,000 times more birds are in flight on New Year's Eve than on other nights. Frightened birds also may abandon nests and not return to complete rearing their young. A scientific study from 2022 indicates that fireworks might have some sort of lasting effect on birds, with many birds spending more time to find food in the weeks after New Year's Eve fireworks.

=== Pollution ===
Fireworks cause significant increases in local particulate matter pollution. In 2023, a team of researchers from NYU Langone Health assessed the effects of the Macy's 4th of July Fireworks on localized air and water pollution. The results of the study showed a sharp rise in airborne particulates, with peak real-time measurements of PM_{2.5} exceeding 1,000 μg/m^{3} at three sampling sites within 30 minutes after the conclusion of the fireworks display, which took several hours to return to pre-event levels. The study also found increased levels of heavy metals in the East River that lasted for one hour after the fireworks ended.

These air pollutants from fireworks raise concerns because of potential health risks associated with the products of combustion. For persons with asthma or other respiratory conditions, the smoke from fireworks may aggravate existing health problems.

Fireworks produce smoke and dust that contain residues of metal compounds, sulfur dioxide, and some low concentration toxic chemicals. These by-products of fireworks combustion will vary depending on the mix of ingredients of a particular firework. (The color green, for instance, may be produced by adding the various compounds and salts of barium, some of which are toxic, and some of which are not.) Some fishers have noticed and reported to environmental authorities that firework residues can hurt fish and other water-life because some may contain toxic compounds (such as antimony sulfide or arsenic). This is a subject of much debate due to the fact that large-scale pollution from other sources makes it difficult to measure the amount of pollution that comes specifically from fireworks. The possible toxicity of any fallout may also be affected by the amount of black powder used, type of oxidizer, colors produced and launch method.

Perchlorate salts, when in solid form, dissolve and move rapidly in groundwater and surface water. Even in low concentrations in drinking water supplies, perchlorate ions are known to inhibit the uptake of iodine by the thyroid gland. As of 2010, there are no federal drinking water standards for perchlorates in the United States, but the US Environmental Protection Agency has studied the impacts of perchlorates on the environment as well as drinking water. Several U.S. states have enacted drinking water standard for perchlorates. Some companies within the U.S. fireworks industry claim they are working with Chinese manufacturers to reduce and ultimately hope to eliminate of the pollutant perchlorate.

Pollution is also a concern because fireworks often contain heavy metals as source of color. However, gunpowder smoke and the solid residues are basic, and as such the cumulative effect of fireworks on acid rain is uncertain. What is not disputed is that most consumer fireworks leave behind a considerable amount of solid debris, including both readily biodegradable components as well as nondegradable plastic items. Concerns over pollution, consumer safety, and debris have restricted the sale and use of consumer fireworks in many countries.

=== Noise ===
Fireworks are a contributor to noise pollution. The sound of the explosions can cause distress in some individuals with post-traumatic stress disorder such as combat veterans, as well people with hyperacusis (sound sensitivity) such as children with autism. Proximity to fireworks can cause hearing damage including tinnitus. Hearing protection is recommended for fireworks viewers, particularly children, and pyrotechnicians.

Regulations in the European Union limit fireworks for sale to the public to a maximum noise level of 120 dB.

Some fireworks displays are designed to be quieter due to concerns that noise effects traumatize pets, wildlife, and some humans. These "silent" firework displays, typically intended for smaller events, exclude large, spectacular, noisy fireworks and make greater use of smaller, quieter devices.

== Government regulations ==
=== Australia ===
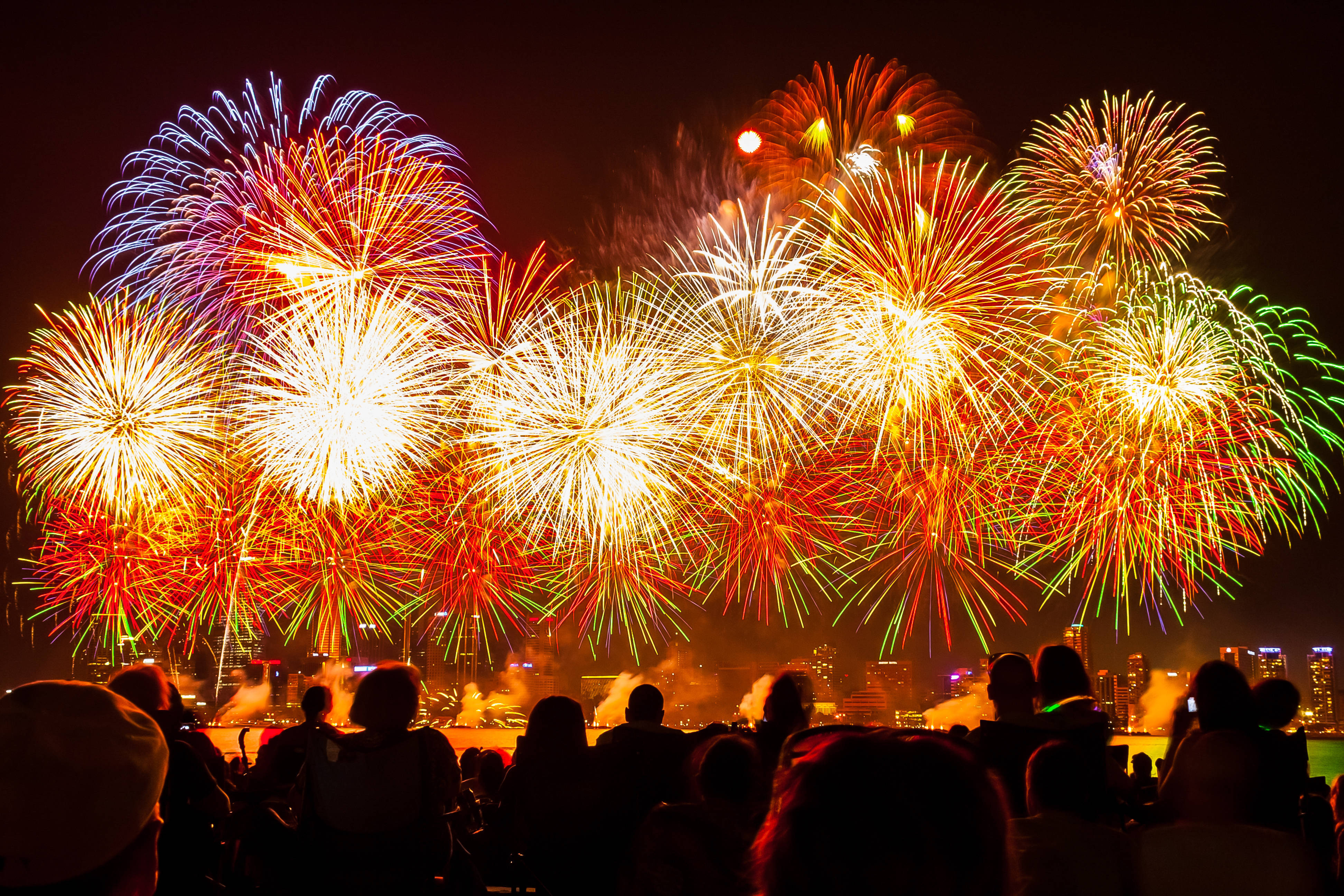
Fireworks at Australia Day 2013 in Perth

Fireworks are illegal in most Australian states and territories, unless part of a display by a licensed pyrotechnician and with a permit. However, Tasmania, ACT and Northern Territory allow consumer use with a permit (dependent on calendar date and circumstances). On 1 July for Territory Day one can freely use fireworks without a permit in the Northern Territory.

Small novelties such as party poppers and sparklers are legal for consumers across Australia.

On 24 August 2009, the ACT Government announced a complete ban on backyard fireworks.

=== Canada ===
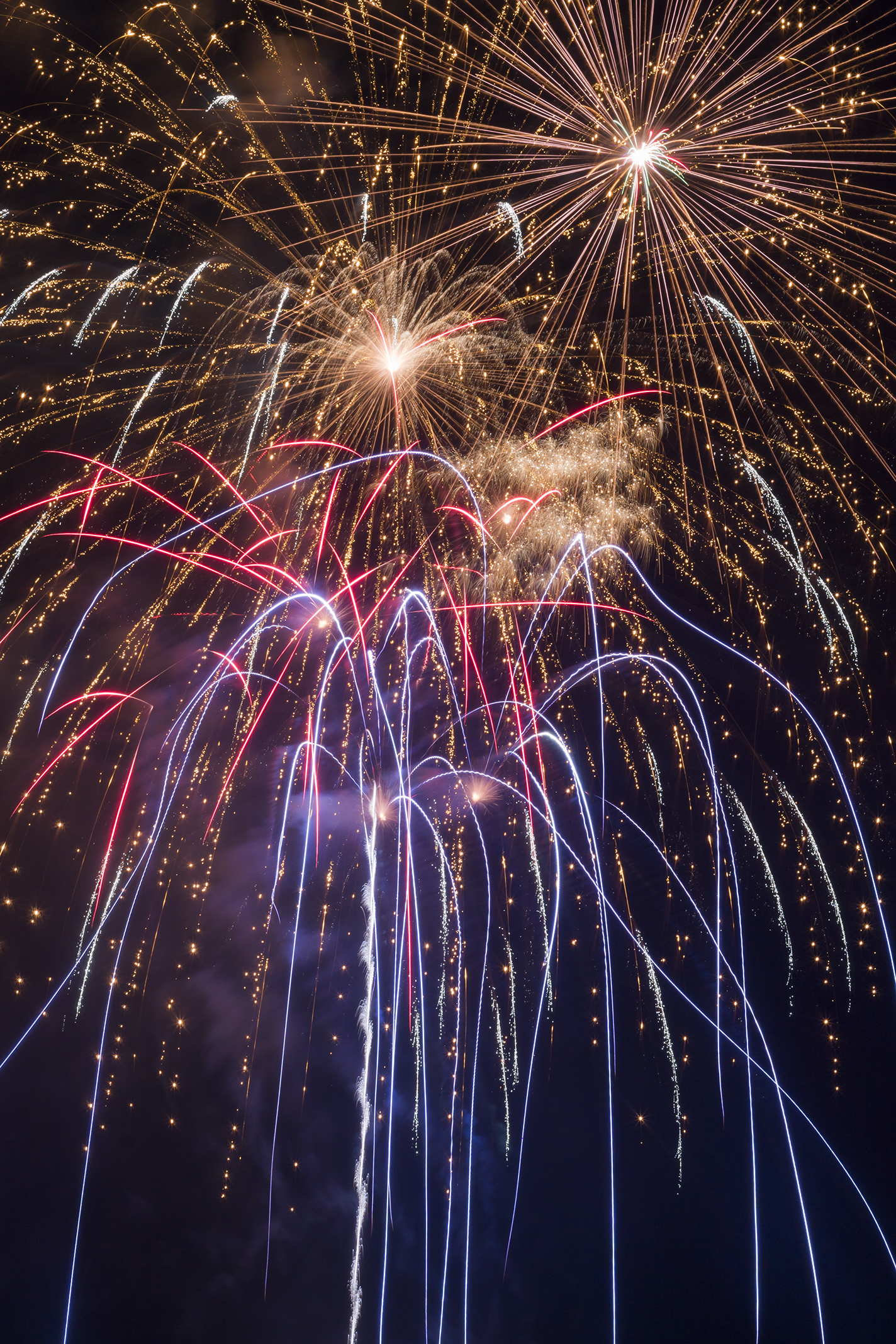
Canada Day 2016 firework show

The use, storage and sale of commercial-grade fireworks in Canada is licensed by Natural Resources Canada's Explosive Regulatory Division (ERD). Unlike their consumer counterpart, commercial-grade fireworks function differently, and come in a wide range of sizes from 50 mm (2 inches) up to 300 mm (11 13/16 inches) or more in diameter. Commercial grade fireworks require a Fireworks Operator Certificate (FOC), obtained from the ERD by completing a one-day safety course. There are two categories of FOC: one for pyrotechnics (those used on stage and in movies) and another for display fireworks (those used in dedicated fireworks shows). Each requires completion of its own course, although there are special categories of FOC which allow visiting operators to run their shows with the assistance of a Canadian supervisor.

The display fireworks FOC has two levels: assistant, and fully licensed. A fully licensed display fireworks operator can also be further endorsed for marine launch, flying saucers, and other more technically demanding fireworks displays.

The pyrotechnician FOC has three levels: pyrotechnician (which allows work under a supervisor), supervising pyrotechnician, and special effects pyrotechnician (which allows the fabrication of certain types of pyrotechnic devices). Additionally, a special effects pyrotechnician can be endorsed for the use of detonating cord.

Since commercial-grade fireworks are shells which are loaded into separate mortars by hand, there is danger in every stage of the setup. Setup of these fireworks involves the placement and securing of mortars on wooden or wire racks; loading of the shells; and if electronically firing, wiring and testing. The mortars are generally made of FRE (fiber-reinforced epoxy) or HDPE (high-density polyethylene). Older mortars made of sheet steel have been banned by most countries due to the problem of shrapnel produced during a misfire.

Setup of mortars in Canada for an oblong firing site require that a mortar be configured at an angle of 10 to 15 degrees down-range with a safety distance of at least 200 meters (660 ft) down-range and 100 meters (330 ft) surrounding the mortars, plus distance adjustments for wind speed and direction. In June 2007, the ERD approved circular firing sites for use with vertically fired mortars with a safety distance of at least 175-meter (574 ft) radius, plus distance adjustments for wind speed and direction.

Loading of shells is a delicate process, and must be done with caution, and a loader must ensure not only the mortar is clean, but also make sure that no part of their body is directly over the mortar in case of a premature fire. Wiring the shells is a painstaking process; whether the shells are being fired manually or electronically, any "chain fusing" or wiring of electrical ignitors, care must be taken to prevent the fuse (an electrical match, often incorrectly called a squib) from igniting. If the setup is wired electrically, the electrical matches are usually plugged into a "firing rail" or "breakout box" that runs back to the main firing board; from there, the Firing Board is simply hooked up to a car battery, and can proceed with firing the show when ready.

Since commercial-grade fireworks are so much larger and more powerful, setup, and firing crews are always under great pressure to ensure they safely set up, fire, and clean up after a show.

=== Chile ===
Law No. 19,680 of 25 May 2000 regulates the sale, manufacture, and use of fireworks in Chile. This law prohibits the general public from manufacturing, possessing and handling pyrotechnic devices and permits their use only by qualified and expert personnel at mass events. Individuals who violate the provisions of the law regarding the possession, handling, manufacture, and sale of these devices may be fined, the pyrotechnic devices confiscated, and the manufacturing, storage, and sales facilities closed.

In December 2020, the Senate of the Republic approved an amendment to the law, elevating the offense from a misdemeanor to a crime, so that violators may receive not only fines but also criminal penalties of up to 541 days. This amendment was enacted on 21 January 2021.

=== European Union ===
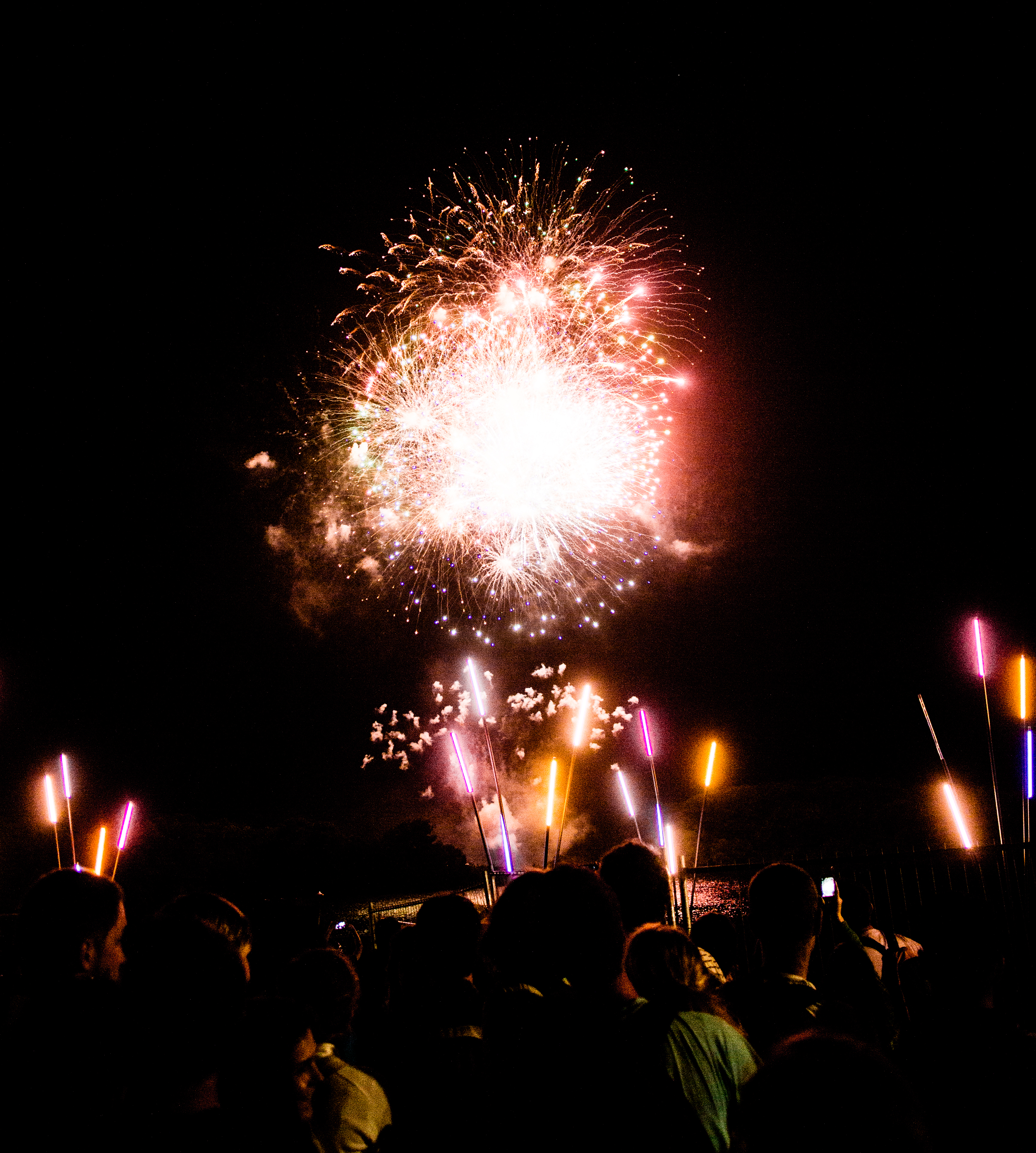
Fireworks at Eurockéennes 2013 in Belfort, France

The European Union's policy is aimed at harmonising and standardising the EU member states' policies on the regulation of production, transportation, sale, consumption and overall safety of fireworks across Europe.

==== Belgium ====
In Belgium, each municipality can decide how to regulate fireworks. During New Year's Eve, lighting fireworks without a licence is allowed in 35% of the 308 Flemish municipalities, in around 50% a permit from the burgemeester (mayor) is required, and around 14% of municipalities have banned consumer fireworks altogether.

==== Finland ====
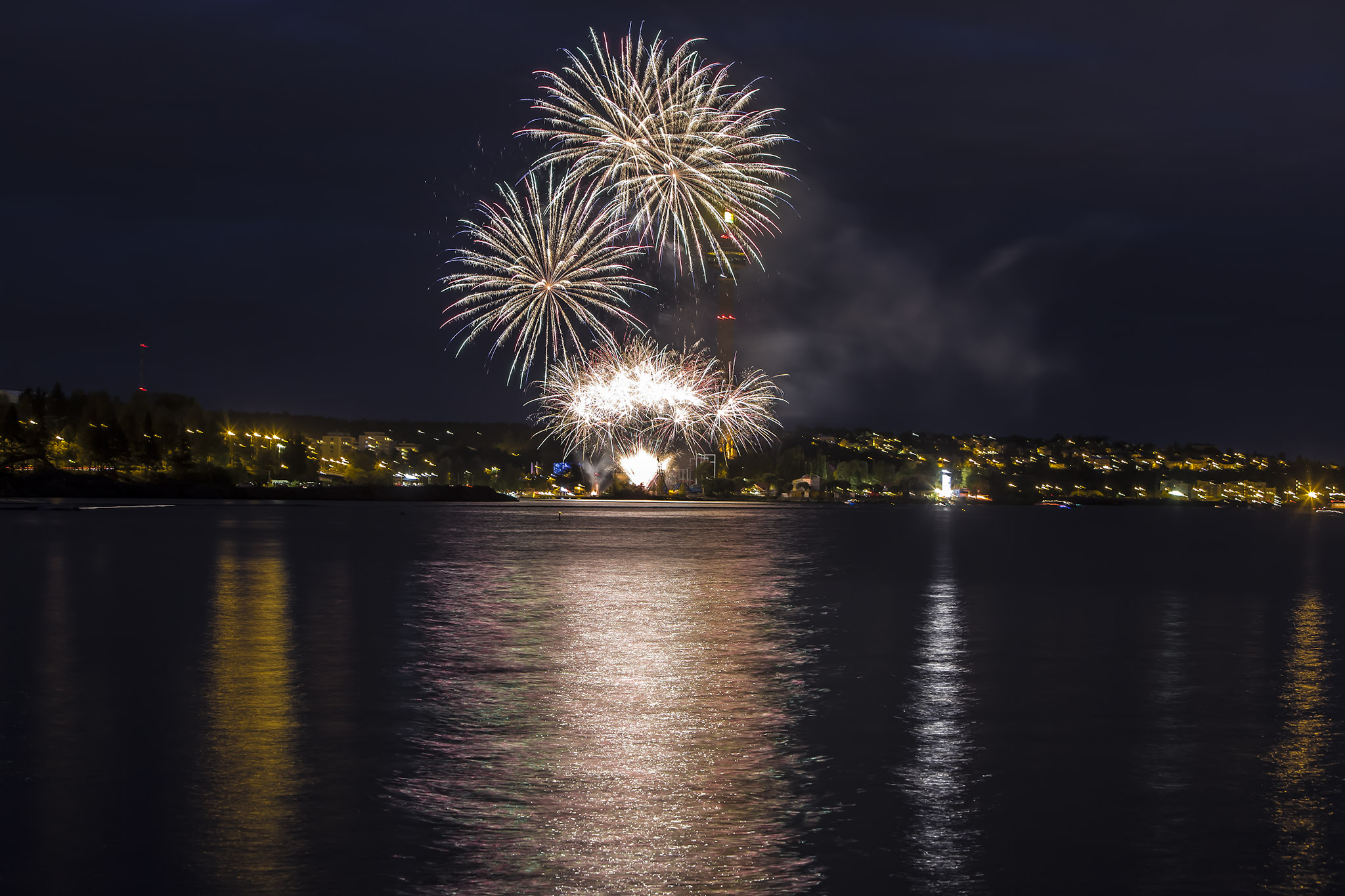
Fireworks on 30 August 2014, in Tampere, Finland

In Finland those under 18 years old haven't been allowed to buy any fireworks since 2009. Safety goggles are required. The use of fireworks is generally allowed on the evening and night of New Year's Eve, 31 December. In some municipalities of Western Finland it is allowed to use fireworks without a fire station's permission on the last weekend of August. With the fire station's permission, fireworks can be used year-round.

Fireworks on 30 August 2026, in Frankfurt, Germany

==== Germany ====
In Germany, amateurs over 18 years old are allowed to buy and ignite fireworks of Category F2 for several hours on 31 December and 1 January; each German municipality is authorised to limit the number of hours this may last locally. The sale of Category F3 and F4 fireworks to consumers is prohibited. Lighting fireworks is forbidden near churches, hospitals, retirement homes and wooden or thatch-roofed buildings. All major German cities organise professional fireworks shows.

In addition to the previously existing regulations, there was a nationwide ban on the sale of category F2 fireworks to consumers on New Year's Eve 2020/2021 during the COVID-19 pandemic, with the aim to relieve the burden on hospitals by reducing the number of emergencies due to injuries caused by fireworks on New Year's Eve.

==== Italy ====
In 2015, the Italian town of Collecchio mandated silent fireworks, being among the first to make the switch without losing the beauty of the visual displays.

==== Netherlands ====
2017 Dutch Safety Board report on fireworks risks (English subtitles)

In the Netherlands, fireworks cannot be sold to anyone under the age of 16. It may only be sold during a period of three days before a new year. If one of these days is a Sunday, that day is excluded from sale and sale may commence one day earlier.

==== Republic of Ireland ====
In the Republic of Ireland, fireworks are illegal; the maximum punishment for possessing fireworks without a licence, or lighting fireworks in a public place, is a €10,000 fine and a five-year prison sentence. However, around Halloween a large amount of fireworks are set off, due to the ease of being able to purchase from Northern Ireland.

==== Sweden ====
In Sweden, fireworks can only be purchased and used by people 18 or older. Firecrackers used to be banned, but are now allowed under European Union fireworks policy.

=== Iceland ===
In Iceland, the Icelandic law states that anyone may purchase and use fireworks during a certain period around New Year's Eve. Most places that sell fireworks in Iceland make their own rules about age of buyers, usually it is around 16. The people of Reykjavík spend enormous sums of money on fireworks, most of which are fired as midnight approaches on 31 December. As a result, every New Year's Eve the city is lit up with fireworks displays.

=== New Zealand ===
Fireworks in New Zealand are available from 2 to 5 November, around Guy Fawkes Day, and may be purchased only by those 18 years of age and older (up from 14 years pre-2007). Despite the restriction on when fireworks may be sold, there is no restriction regarding when fireworks may be used. The types of fireworks available to the public are multi-shot "cakes", Roman candles, single shot shooters, ground and wall spinners, fountains, cones, sparklers, and various novelties, such as smoke bombs and Pharaoh's serpents. Consumer fireworks are also not allowed to be louder than 90 decibels.

=== Norway ===
In Norway, fireworks can only be purchased and used by people 18 or older. Sale is restricted to a few days before New Year's Eve. Rockets are not allowed.

=== United Kingdom ===
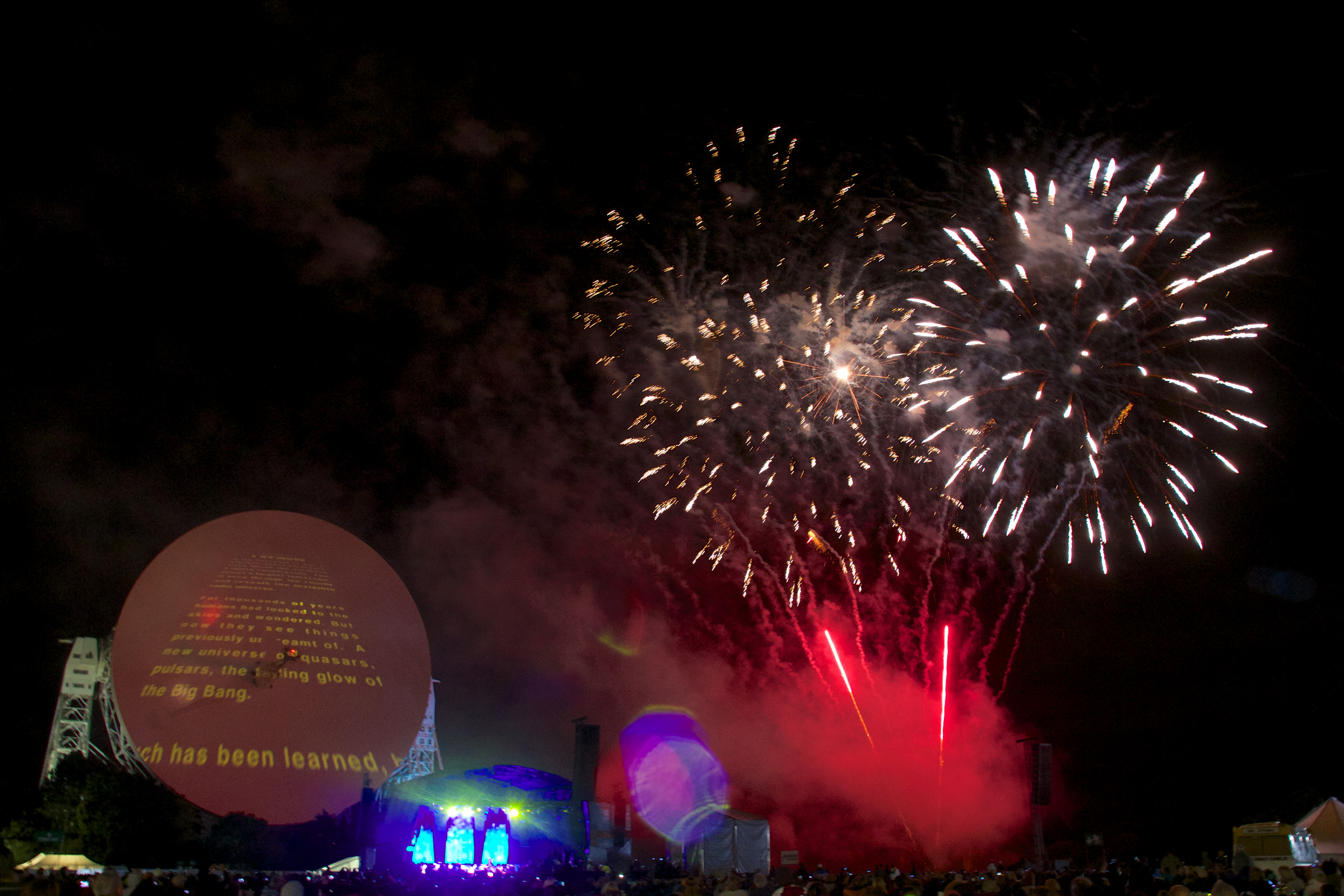
Firework display at the Jodrell Bank Observatory 2013

Fireworks in the United Kingdom have become more strictly regulated since 1997. Since 2005, the law has been harmonised gradually, in accordance with other EU member state laws.

Fireworks are mostly used in England, Scotland and Wales around Diwali (late October or early November), on Guy Fawkes Night, 5 November and on New Year's Eve. In the UK, responsibility for the safety of firework displays is shared between the Health and Safety Executive, fire brigades and local authorities. Currently, there is no national system of licensing for fireworks operators, but in order to purchase large display fireworks, operators must have licensed explosives storage and public liability insurance.

Category 1 fireworks are restricted to persons aged 16 and over, while the age limit on both Category 2 and 3 fireworks is eighteen, and the sale and possession of Category 4 fireworks is restricted to licensed professionals only. Fireworks are not permitted to be set off between 11pm and 7am with exceptions only for:

- Bonfire Night (5 November) (permitted until midnight)
- The Chinese New Year (permitted until 1am)
- Diwali (permitted until 1am)
- New Year (permitted on New Year's Eve until 1am on New Year's Day)

The maximum legal NEC (net explosive content) of a UK firework available to the public is two kilograms. Jumping jacks, strings of firecrackers, shell firing tubes, bangers and mini-rockets were all banned during the late 1990s. In 2004, single-shot air bombs and bottle rockets were banned, and rocket sizes were limited. From March 2008 any firework with more than 5% flashpowder per tube has been classified 1.3G. The aim of these measures was to eliminate "pocket money" fireworks, and to limit the disruptive effects of loud bangs.

=== United States ===
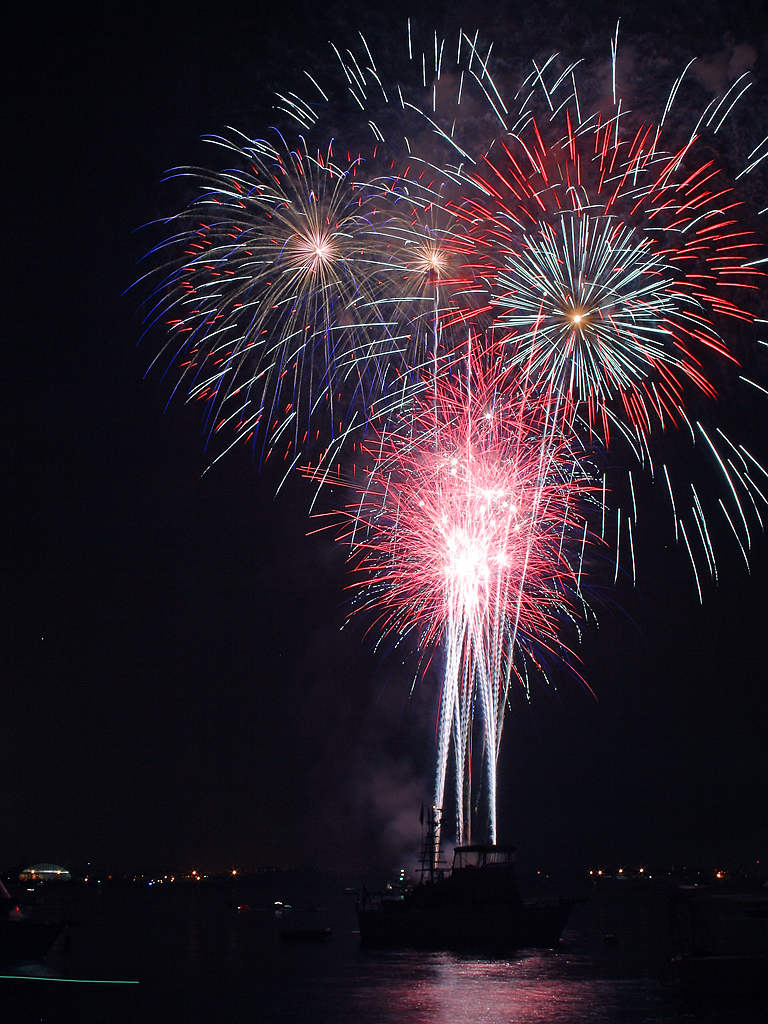
Independence Day fireworks in San Diego, California

In the United States, fireworks laws vary widely from state to state or county to county. Federal, state, and local authorities govern the use of display fireworks in the United States. The Consumer Product Safety Commission (CPSC) regulates consumer fireworks at the federal level through the Federal Hazardous Substances Act (FHSA). The National Fire Protection Association (NFPA) sets forth a set of codes that give the minimum standards of display fireworks use and safety in the U.S. Both state and local jurisdictions can further add restrictions on the use and safety requirements of display fireworks. There are currently 46 states in the United States in which fireworks are legal for consumer use.

== Fireworks celebrations ==
=== Australia ===
In Australia, fireworks displays are frequently used in the celebration of public holidays, particularly New Year's Eve and Australia Day. The most famous is the Sydney New Year's Eve Midnight Fireworks. In the Northern Territory, "Cracker Night" is celebrated every 1 July on Territory Day, where residents are allowed to buy and use fireworks without a permit.

=== Canada ===
Fireworks are a popular tradition during Halloween in Vancouver.

=== France ===
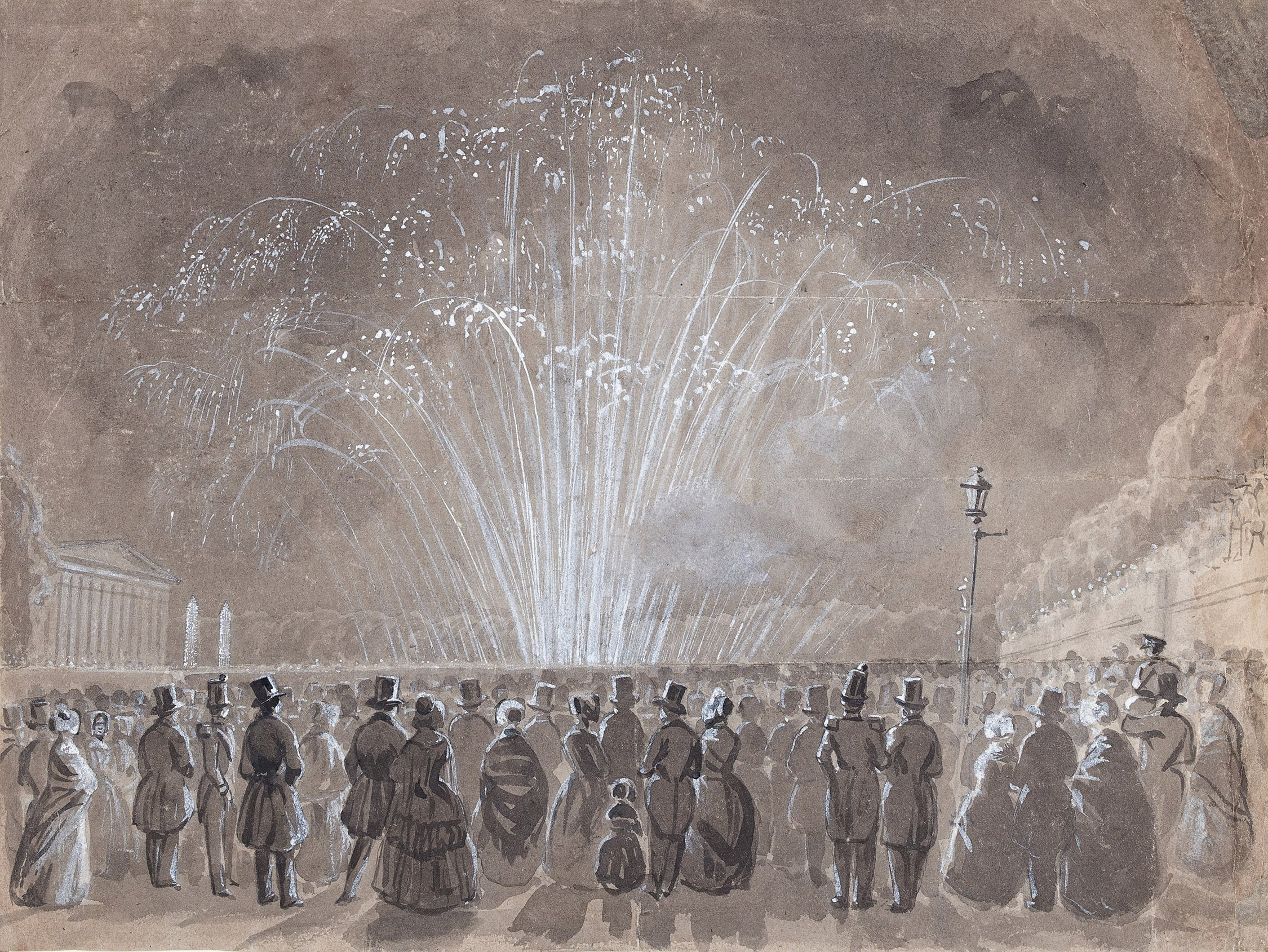
A firework display by the British illustrator Ebenezer Landells, possibly the display given by Napoleon III on Queen Victoria's 1855 visit to Paris

In France, fireworks are traditionally displayed on the eve of Bastille day (14 July) to commemorate the French revolution and the storming of the Bastille on that same day in 1789. Every city in France lights up the sky for the occasion with a special mention to Paris that offers a spectacle around the Eiffel Tower.

=== Hungary ===
Fireworks at the Danube

In Hungary, fireworks are used on 20 August, which is a national celebration day.

=== India ===
Indians throughout the world celebrate with fireworks as part of their popular "festival of lights" (Diwali) in Oct-Nov every year.

=== Ireland ===
In the Republic of Ireland and Northern Ireland there are many fireworks displays during Halloween.

=== Japan ===
During the summer in Japan, fireworks festivals (花火大会, hanabi taikai) are held nearly every day someplace in the country, numbering more than 200 during August alone. The festivals consist of large fireworks shows, the largest of which use between 100,000 and 120,000 rounds (Tondabayashi, Osaka), and can attract more than 800,000 spectators. Street vendors set up stalls to sell various drinks and staple Japanese food (such as yakisoba, okonomiyaki, takoyaki, kakigōri (shaved ice), and traditionally held festival games, such as kingyo-sukui, or goldfish scooping.

Even today, men and women attend these events wearing the traditional yukata, summer kimono, or jinbei, and gather in large social circles of family or friends to sit picnic-like, eating and drinking, while watching the show.

The first fireworks festival in Japan was held in 1733 when Tokugawa Yoshimune, the eight shogun of the Edo Period, decreed a festival be held on the Sumida River on 9 July every year to mourn those who died in famine and other disasters. This event is recognized as the start of the Sumidagawa Fireworks Festival, and is one of the most recognizable fireworks festivals in Japan.

=== Malta ===
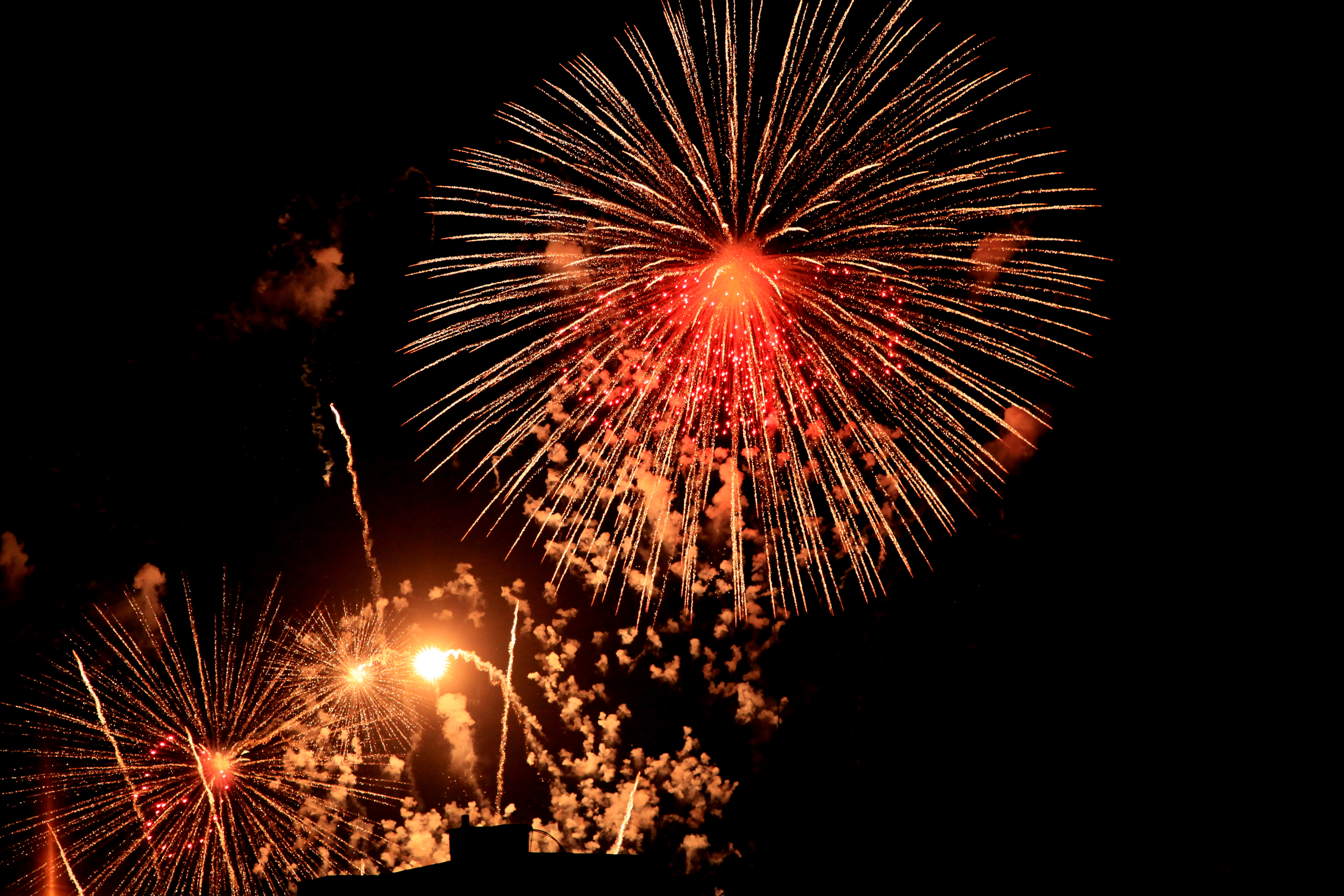
Fireworks at a Maltese festival in 2014

When the islands were ruled by the Order of St John, fireworks were used on special occasions such as the election of a new Grand Master, the appointment of a new Pope or the birth of a prince.

Nowadays, fireworks are used in village feasts throughout the summer. The Malta International Fireworks Festival is also held annually.

=== Monaco ===
Since 1966, pyrotechnics experts from around the world have competed in the Monte Carlo International Fireworks Festival. The festival runs from July to August every year, and the winner returns in 18 November for the fireworks display on the night before the National Day of Monaco. The event is held in Port Hercule, beginning at around 9:30pm every night, depending on the sunset.

=== Singapore ===
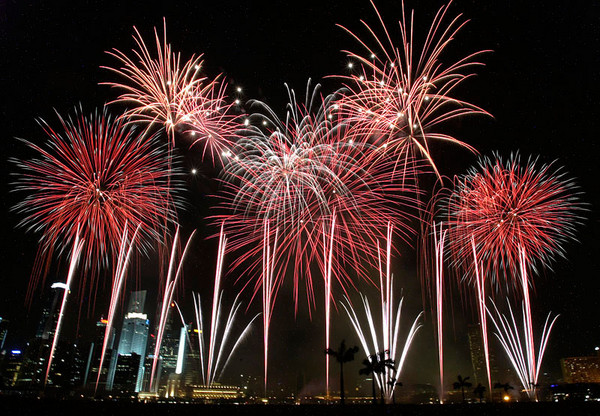
Singapore Fireworks Festival 2006, 8 August 2006

The Singapore Fireworks Celebrations (previously the Singapore Fireworks Festival) is an annual event held in Singapore as part of its National Day, New Year's Day and Chinese New Year celebrations. The festival features local and foreign teams which launch displays on different nights. While currently non-competitive in nature, the organizer has plans to introduce a competitive element in the future.

The annual festival has grown in magnitude, from 4,000 rounds used in 2004, to 6,000 in 2005, to more than 9,100 in 2006.

=== South Korea ===
Busan International Fireworks Festival is one of the most significant fireworks festivals in Asia.

=== Spain ===
==== Catalonia ====
Fireworks are an essential element of popular festival in Catalonia, especially the patron saint day for each Catalan town or city, usually called Festa Major. Coet (rocket) is the generic term for all kinds of pyrotechnic devices. Professional aerial displays are less common than the use of ground based fireworks by members of ritual crews.

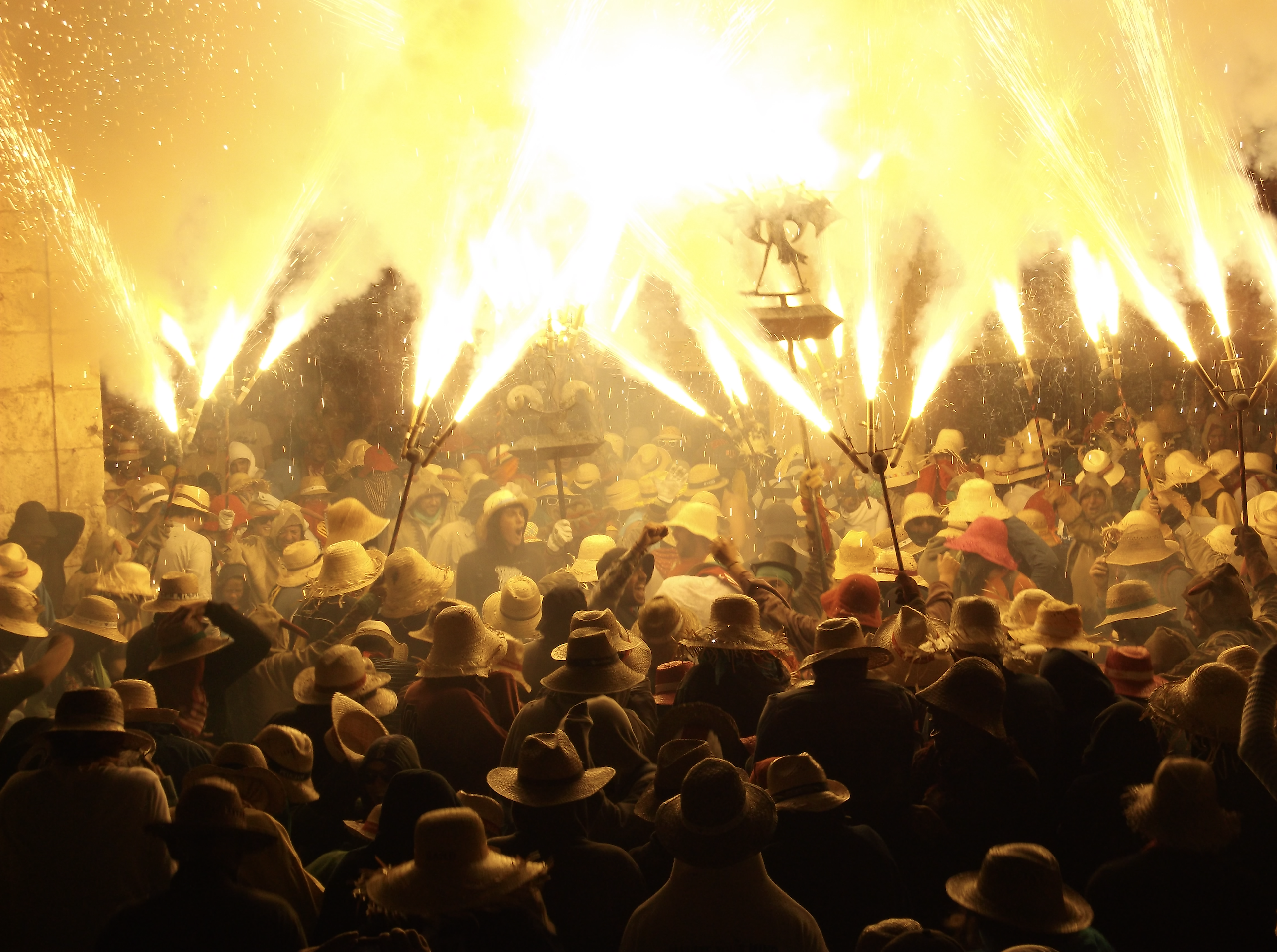
Ball de diables de Vilanova i la Geltrú, francesos mounted on maces and Llucifer's ceptrot at center

The Correfoc (fire-run) is an element of many festivals, in which crews of diables (devils) dance through the streets to beating drums, holding maces above their heads upon which are mounted carretilles which spin, producing a shower of sparks culminating in an explosive pop. There are three types, les normals, les xiuladores, which emit a whistling sound, and les Arboç, which produce a large umbrella of sparks. Those that emit sparks but do not spin are called francesos and a larger, more potent version are called portuguessos. Those that emit only light are simulators and those that serve to ignite all types of coets are called botafoc, only used by the cap de la colla, or crew chief, who decides when ignition occurs. In many cases, the devils light their carretilles simultaneously by holding all of their maces together and once ignited, begin dancing to the beat of pounding drums. The character of Llucifer carries a larger and more elaborate mace called a ceptrot which is said to "dominate over all," pictured at right.

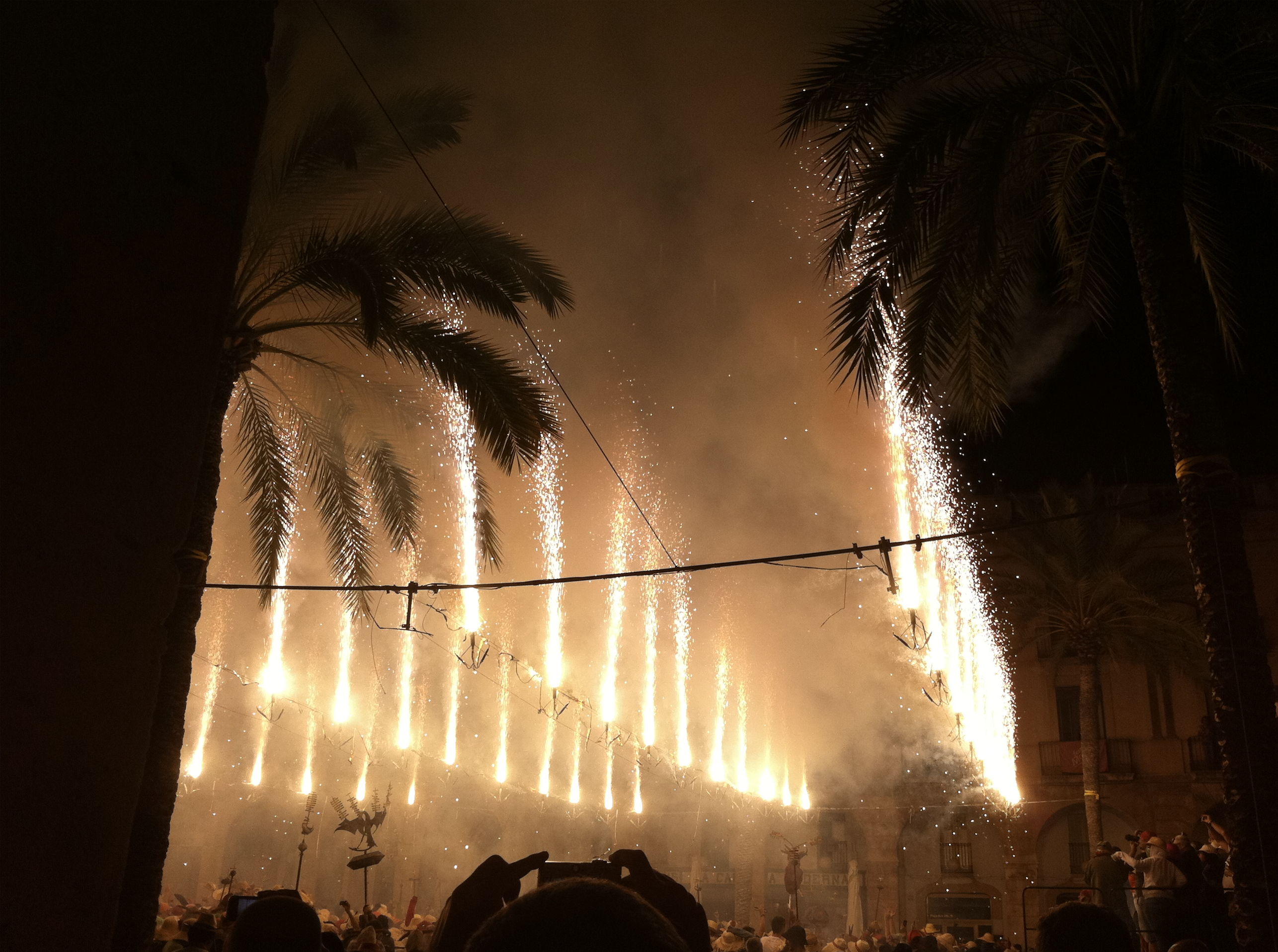
Sostre de foc (ceiling of fire), Vilanova i la Geltrú, Festa Major 2012.Spark producing francesos mounted on wire above Plaça de la Vila

Pyrotechnics feature in several other Catalan festes:

Nit de San Joan (St. John's Night, 14 June) townsfolk set off rockets from all over town and light bonfires.

Parliament de Diables (the infernal parliament) is a ritual performance by crews of devils in which characters such as Lucifer, the Diablessa (portrayed by a man in women's clothes), and other members of the crew declaim satiric verses commenting on current events, punctuated by pyrotechnic dances.

La Patum is celebrated in Berga on Corpus Christi, which has featured a ball de diables called Els Plens since 1628. In 2005, UNESCO declared La Patum one of the Masterpieces of the Oral and Intangible Heritage of Humanity.

The correfoc of the festa major of Vilanova i la Geltrú culminates in a sostre de foc (ceiling of fire) during which a mass of coets attached to wires are strung above the central plaza enabling the assembled multitude to be showered with sparks and explosions from the sky.

=== Switzerland ===
In Switzerland fireworks are often used on 1 August, which is a national celebration day.

=== United Kingdom ===
One of the biggest occasions for fireworks in the UK is Guy Fawkes Night held each year on 5 November, to celebrate the foiling of the Catholic Gunpowder Plot on 5 November 1605, an attempt to kill King James I. The Guardian newspaper said in 2008 that Britain's biggest Guy Fawkes night events were:

- After Dark fireworks, Sheffield
- Bangers on the Beach (Holyhead Round Table charity fireworks), Holyhead
- Battel Bonfire in Battle, East Sussex
- Blackheath Fireworks, London
- Bught Park fireworks, Inverness
- Fireworks with Vikings, Tutbury, Staffordshire
- Flaming Tar Barrels, Ottery St Mary
- Glasgow Green fireworks
- Halloween Happening fireworks, Derry
- Midsummer Common, Cambridge
- Sparks in the Park (Cardiff Round Table charity fireworks), Cardiff

The main firework celebrations in the UK are by the public who buy from many suppliers.

=== United States ===
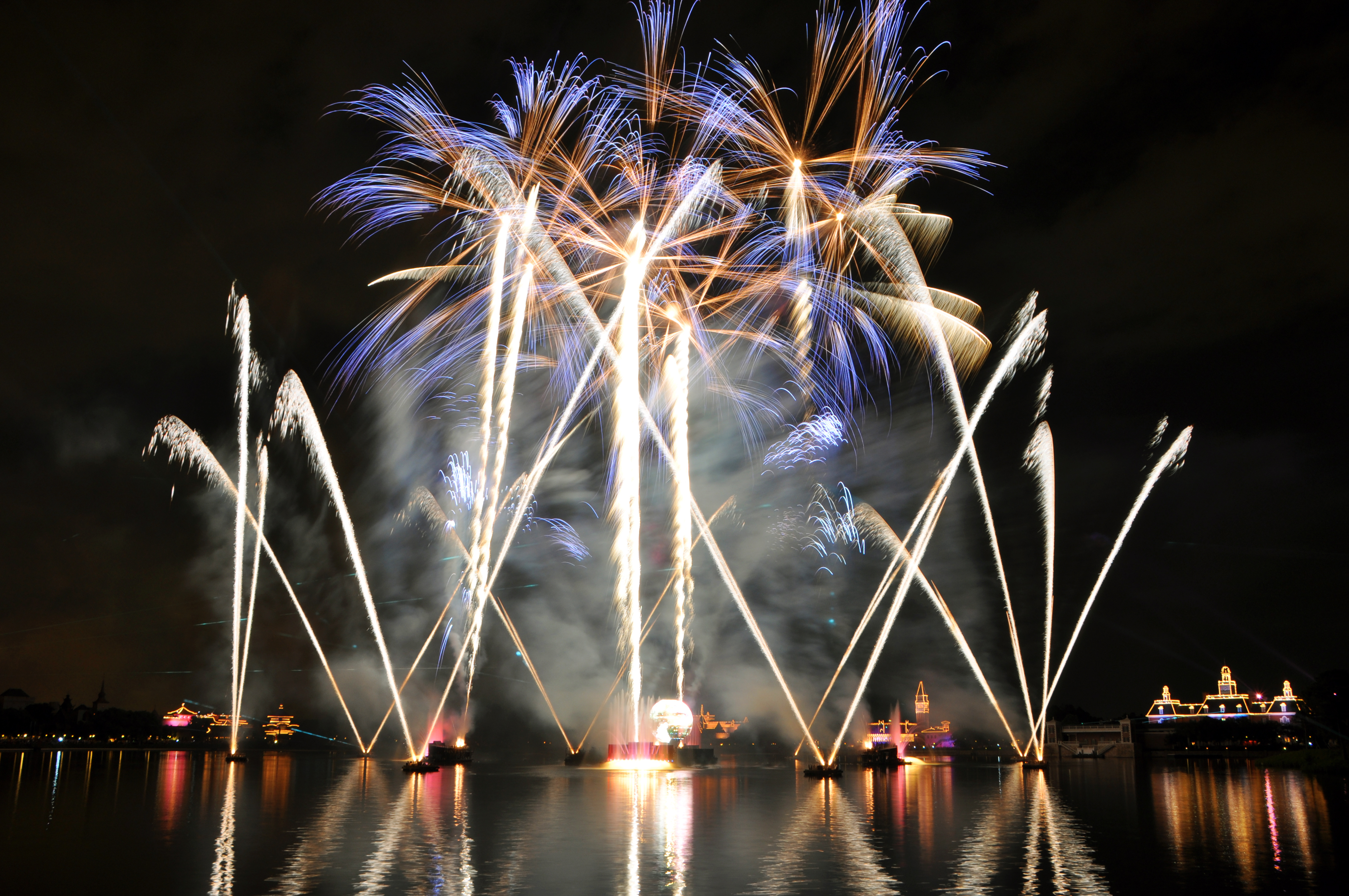
A long-exposure shot of the finale of the second act of IllumiNations: Reflections of Earth, the former nightly fireworks show at Epcot in Walt Disney World

America's earliest settlers brought their enthusiasm for fireworks to the United States. Fireworks and black ash were used to celebrate important events long before the American Revolutionary War. The first celebration of Independence Day was in 1777, six years before Americans knew whether or not the new nation would survive the war; fireworks were a part of all festivities. In 1789, George Washington's inauguration was accompanied by a fireworks display. George Marshall was an American naval hero during the War of 1812 and other campaigns. He was a Master Gunner and pyrotechnics specialist who wrote Marshall's Practical Marine Gunnery in 1822. The book outlines chemical formulas for the composition of fireworks. This early fascination with fireworks' noise and color continues today with fireworks displays commonly included in Independence Day celebrations.

In 2004, Disneyland, in Anaheim, California, pioneered the commercial use of aerial fireworks launched with compressed air rather than gunpowder. The display shell explodes in the air using an electronic timer. The advantages of compressed air launch are a reduction in fumes, and much greater accuracy in height and timing. The Walt Disney Company is now the largest consumer of fireworks in the world.

Two firework displays on All Hallows' Eve in the United States are the "Happy Hallowishes" show at Walt Disney World's Magic Kingdom "Mickey's Not-So-Scary Halloween Party" event, which began in 2005, and the "Halloween Screams" at Disneyland Park, which began in 2009.

== Uses other than public displays ==
In addition to large public displays, people often buy small quantities of fireworks for their own celebrations. Fireworks on general sale are usually less powerful than professional fireworks. Types include firecrackers, rockets, cakes (multishot aerial fireworks), and smoke balls.

Fireworks can also be used in an agricultural capacity as to frighten away birds.

Fireworks have been used in destructive pranks, such as using them to destroy mailboxes.

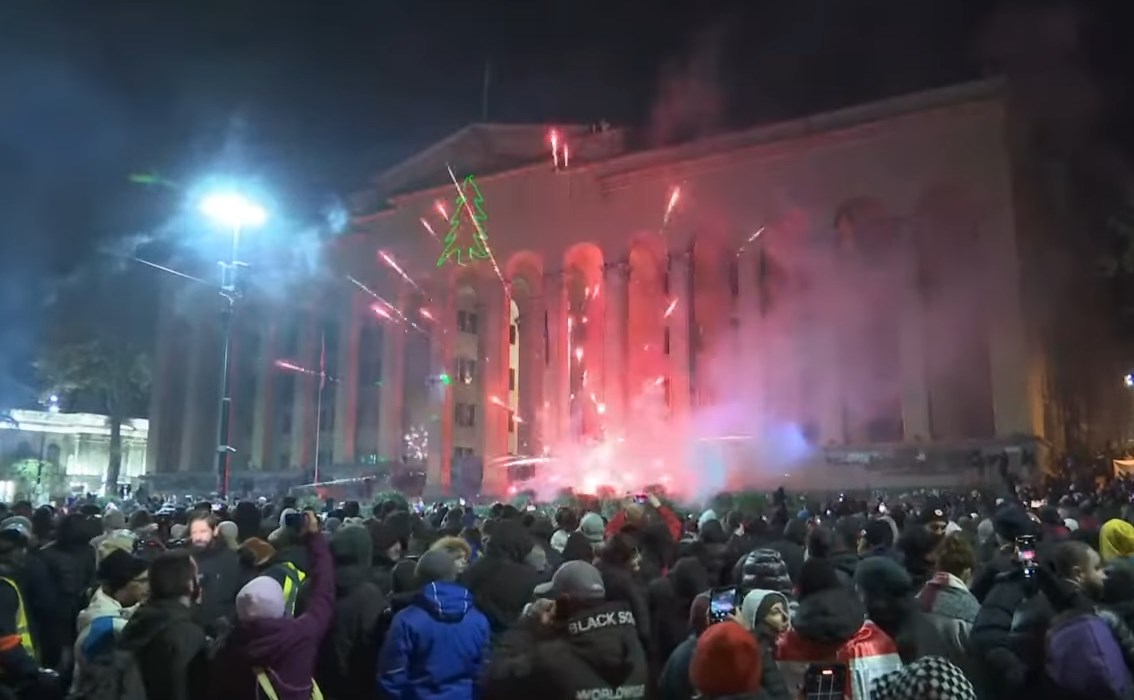
Protesters using fireworks to deter riot police during protests in Georgia in 2024

Fireworks have also found use by protesters in some regions as a legally available means of confronting security forces. They were widely employed during 2024–2025 Georgian protests, which led to stricter governmental control on import and sale of fireworks.

== Culture ==
=== Competitions ===
Pyrotechnical competitions are held in many countries. Among them are the Montreal Fireworks Festival, an annual competition held in Montreal, Quebec, Canada; Le Festival d'Art Pyrotechnique, held in the summer annually at the Bay of Cannes in Côte d'Azur, France; and the Philippine International Pyromusical Competition, held in Manila, Philippines amongst the top fireworks companies in the world.

=== Clubs and organizations ===
Enthusiasts in the United States have formed clubs which unite hobbyists and professionals. The groups provide safety instruction and organize meetings and private shoots at remote premises where members shoot commercial fireworks as well as fire pieces of their own manufacture. Clubs secure permission to fire items otherwise banned by state or local ordinances. Competition among members and between clubs, demonstrating everything from single shells to elaborate displays choreographed to music, are held. One of the oldest clubs is Crackerjacks, Inc., organized in 1976 in the Eastern Seaboard region.

Though based in the US, membership of the Pyrotechnics Guild International, Inc. (PGI) is annual convention founded in 1969, it hosts some the world's biggest fireworks displays occur. Aside from the nightly firework shows, one of the most popular events of the convention is a unique event where individual classes of hand-built fireworks are competitively judged, ranging from simple fireworks rockets to extremely large and complex aerial shells. Some of the biggest, most intricate fireworks displays in the United States take place during the convention week.

== Firework sales ==
According to industry data, the purchase of fireworks by American consumers has markedly increased since the onset of the COVID-19 pandemic. In the year preceding the pandemic, the consumer fireworks industry reported sales of approximately $1 billion. However, this figure almost doubled in 2020, reaching $2.3 billion. In contrast, commercial fireworks sales amounted to a smaller figure of $400 million. For context, consumer fireworks revenue was significantly lower at $645 million in 2012, indicating a steady growth trend in the market. Industry projections currently anticipate a further increase, forecasting fireworks sales to reach $3.3 billion by 2028.

== See also ==
- List of fireworks accidents and incidents
