= Firecrackers in the Philippines =

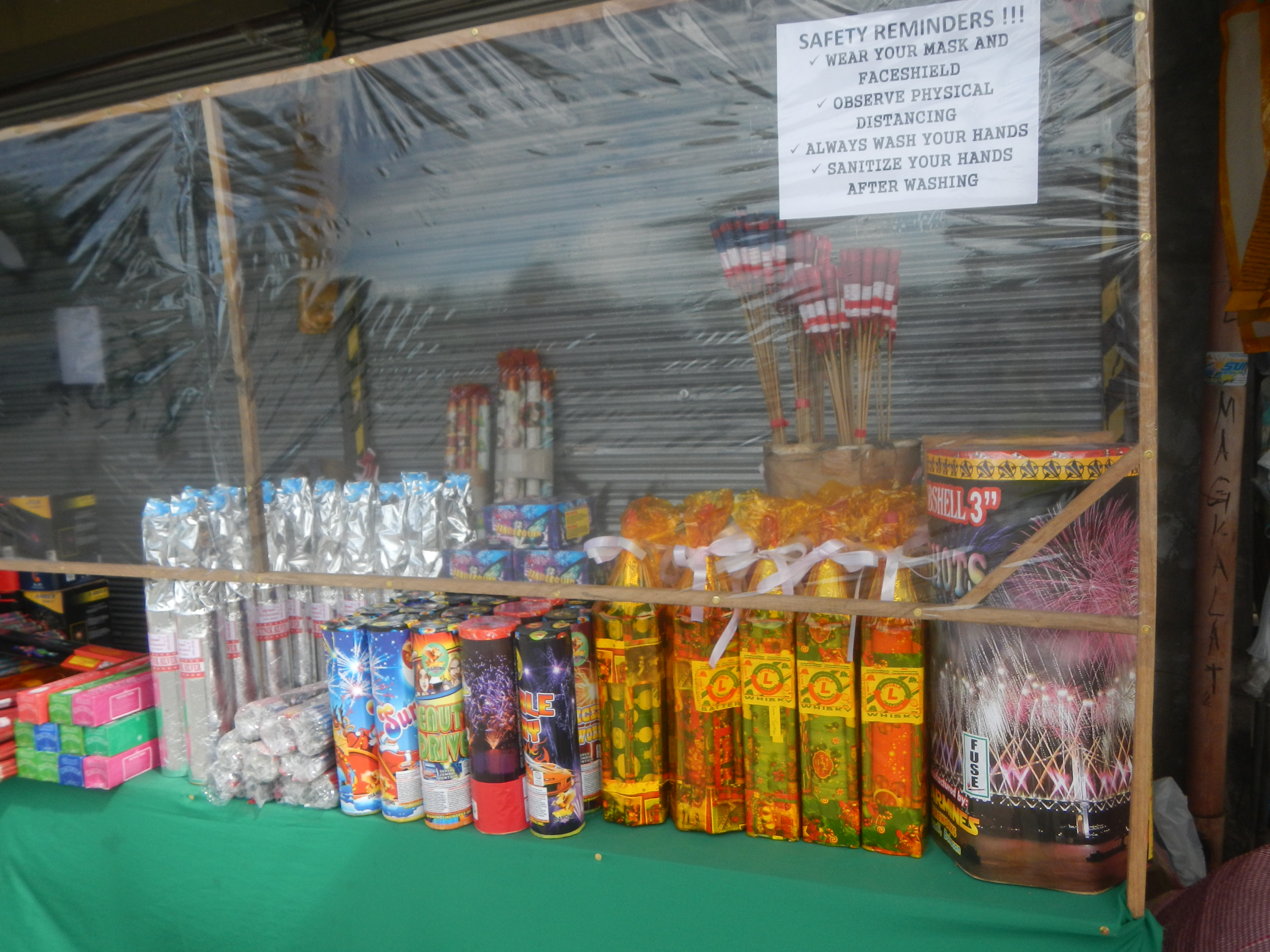
Firecrackers displayed for sale in the Philippines.

Firecrackers in the Philippines refers to small explosive devices (paputok) commonly used to mark the New Year and other festivities. While firecrackers are deeply embedded in Filipino popular culture, their use is regulated by national law and a patchwork of local ordinances because of recurring injuries, fires, and air-pollution spikes during holiday periods.

== History ==
Firecrackers (paputok) in the Philippines blend Chinese pyrotechnic traditions with local Catholic festivities and modern commercial manufacturing. Historians and reporters commonly trace the practice to Chinese influence, fire and noise were believed to drive away evil spirits and misfortune, an idea that entered Filipino popular celebrations and New Year customs via Chinese merchants and later Chinese-Filipino communities.

=== Emergence of a local industry (19th–early 20th century) ===
The best-documented origin story of Philippine firecracker making centers on Bulacan province. Magazine and government accounts credit Valentín Sta. Ana of Bulacan with mastering the craft around 1867, reportedly after learning pyrotechnics from a parish priest who used kwitis (rockets) during the Christmas Simbang Gabi season. An academic survey likewise notes that Bulacan, particularly Bocaue, became the cradle of the trade in the archipelago.

By the 1930s, Sta. Ana's sons Valerio and Fernando Sta. Ana had formalized production. Provincial records state that in 1938 the brothers opened the Santa Ana Fireworks Factory in Santa Maria, Bulacan; after the war, Fernando founded Victory Fireworks and is styled by the province as the country's "Father of Modern Fireworks and Pyrotechnics."

=== Trading hub and postwar expansion (mid-20th century) ===
Two neighboring Bulacan towns then differentiated roles that persist today: Santa Maria concentrated manufacturing, while Bocaue evolved into the primary trading hub because of its transport links and proximity to Metro Manila. Through the post-World War II decades, demand for New Year and fiesta noise-making spurred small workshops and a growing seasonal workforce across Bulacan; later, satellite factories also appeared in neighboring provinces, notably Cavite and Laguna.

Despite periods of tighter policing (including during the 1970s–80s), the trade endured and even professionalized in parts, exporting displays and joining international competitions.

=== Regulation and public safety milestones (1990s–2010s) ===
Growing concerns about injuries, fires and unsafe products culminated in Republic Act No. 7183 (January 30, 1992), the first comprehensive national law regulating the manufacture, sale, distribution and use of firecrackers and other pyrotechnic devices. The Philippine National Police later issued revised implementing rules in 2012 that clarified classifications and licensing.

Bulacan's centrality also meant it figured in major incidents that shaped enforcement and local risk management. On July 2, 1993, the Bocaue pagoda tragedy, a fluvial festival accident unrelated to factory production but occurring in the firecracker-trading town—killed more than 200 devotees and led to decades of safety reforms in the annual river procession. On December 31, 2007, a daytime fire ripped through a row of fireworks stalls in Bocaue's Turo area, injuring several and prompting tighter local controls on stall siting and firebreaks. Outside Bulacan, a major blast at the Starmaker factory in Trece Martires, Cavite, on January 29, 2009, killed at least five and injured dozens, focusing national attention on factory licensing and worker safety.

Long-running public-health surveillance also highlighted the role of specific illegal or imported products, especially the small piccolo stick, leading to repeated crackdowns by customs and local governments in the 2000s–2010s.

In 2017, national policy pivoted toward centralized, supervised displays when Executive Order No. 28 limited consumer firecracker use to LGU-sanctioned community fireworks displays under police supervision; after this, many cities strengthened or adopted local bans or designated pyro-zones while allowing professional shows.

=== Contemporary (2010s–present) ===
While national rules tightened and some Metro Manila LGUs temporarily imposed total bans during the COVID-19 years, Bulacan's role remains visible each December as buyers flock to Bocaue and surrounding towns; prices and demand fluctuate year-to-year with regulation and household budgets. Academic and government reporting continue to document the cultural persistence of fireworks in fiestas and New Year's Eve alongside periodic injury spikes and evolving safety campaigns (Iwas Paputok).

== Firecracker regulations ==
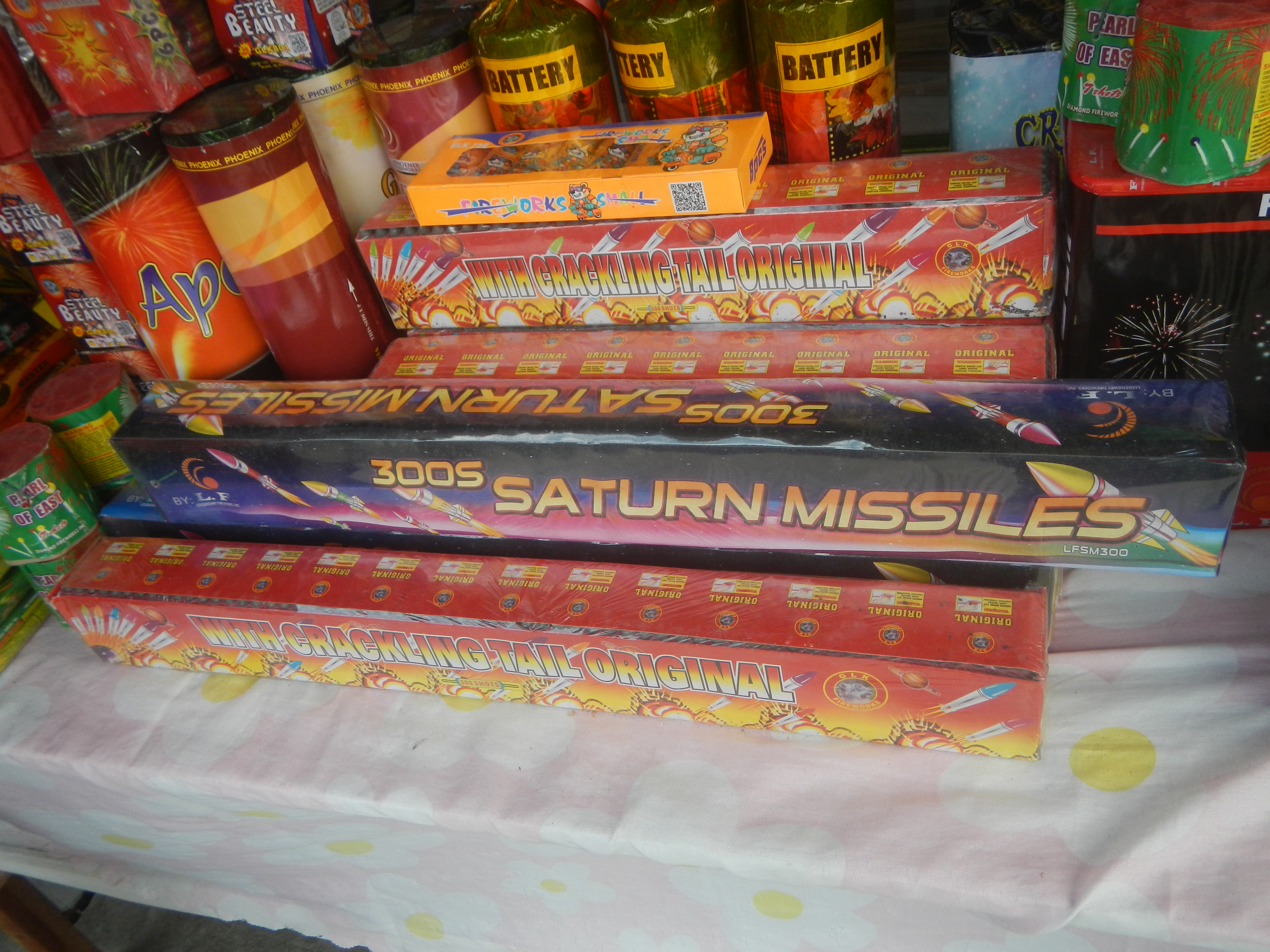
Fireworks displayed for sale in the Philippines.

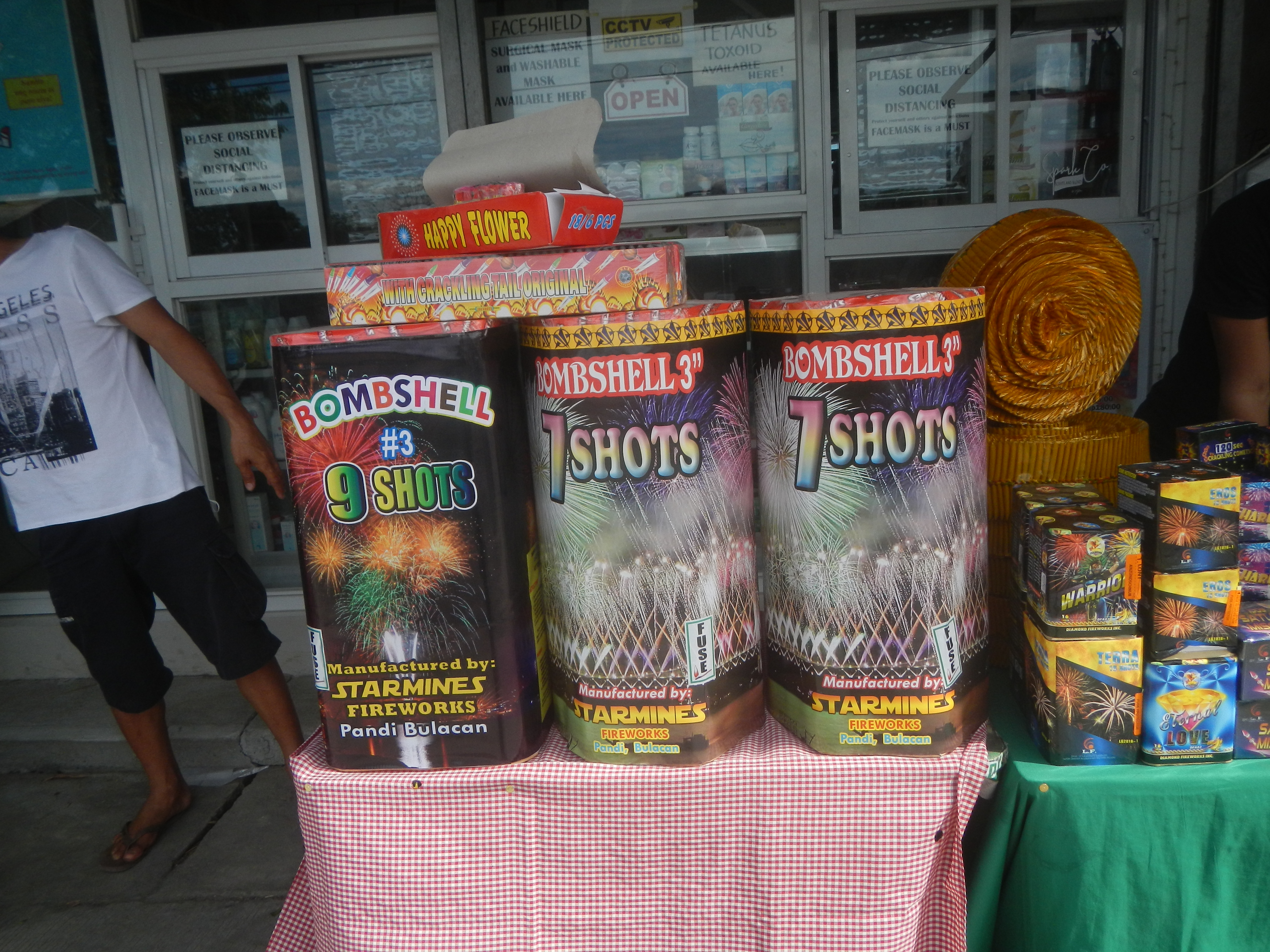
Another type of fireworks displayed for sale in the Philippines.

=== National regulations ===
The principal law is Republic Act No. 7183 (1992), which regulates the sale, manufacture, distribution and use of firecrackers and other pyrotechnic devices and authorizes the Philippine National Police (PNP) to determine prohibited devices and enforce the law. Violations may be penalized by fines, imprisonment, cancellation of licenses, and confiscation of stocks. In 2012 the PNP issued revised Implementing Rules and Regulations (IRR) classifying devices and prescribing licensing and safety rules for manufacturers, dealers, and display operators.

In 2017 Executive Order No. 28 restricted the use of firecrackers to community fireworks displays in LGU-designated zones under PNP-licensed supervision. Other pyrotechnic devices may be used subject to existing laws, but the PNP must promulgate criteria and specific lists of prohibited items. The Department of the Interior and Local Government (DILG) followed with memoranda (MC 2017-105 and 2017–168) directing LGUs and enforcement agencies to implement EO 28. The PNP–FEO periodically publishes a list of prohibited firecrackers (e.g., watusi, piccolo, five-star, super lolo, boga, and other overweight/oversized or unlabeled devices).

=== Local ordinances ===
Local governments implement RA 7183 and EO 28 through ordinances that range from partial restrictions to total bans. Davao City has enforced a comprehensive ban since 2002 (City Ordinance 060–02), with fines and possible imprisonment for repeat violations; the city regularly reports zero firecracker injuries each New Year. Other LGUs with long-standing bans include Muntinlupa (Ordinance No. 14-092, 2013; updated guidance 2017) and Olongapo (City Ordinance No. 63, 2008). During the COVID-19 pandemic, Metro Manila's 17 LGUs jointly imposed a temporary total ban for the 2020 year-end holidays, allowing only authorized community displays.

== Industry and enforcement ==
Manufacturing and trade are concentrated in Bulacan (notably Santa Maria for factories and Bocaue for retail "pyro-zones"). National enforcement involves the PNP–FEO (licensing, inspections, seizures), the Bureau of Fire Protection (fire safety), and the Department of Trade and Industry (DTI) for product certification (PS mark/ICC).

== Health and safety concerns ==
=== Pollution ===
Firecracker use has been associated with short-term spikes in particulate matter (PM_{2.5}/PM_{10}) and metals, degrading air quality to "very unhealthy" or "hazardous" levels around midnight on New Year's Eve in urban areas. In Metro Manila, independent and government monitors have repeatedly documented sharp PM_{2.5} surges tied to fireworks; the Department of Environment and Natural Resources Environmental Management Bureau (DENR–EMB) reported improved but still elevated levels entering 2025, crediting stricter rules and more community displays.

=== Health and safety ===
The Department of Health (DOH) operates seasonal surveillance (Iwas Paputok/APIR) each December to January. For the 2024-2025 holiday period, the DOH logged 340 fireworks-related injuries (FWRIs) as of January 1, 2025 (34% lower year-on-year); subsequent bulletins reported 704 by January 3 and 843 by January 6, 2025, across sentinel sites, including cases from illegal devices such as boga, five-star, and piccolo. DOH and medical literature note frequent hand and eye trauma, burns, and amputations; children and adolescent males are disproportionately affected. Historical poisonings from watusi ingestion led to intensified prohibitions and warnings.

=== Campaigns and alternatives ===
Public agencies promote safer celebrations through Iwas Paputok (Avoid Fireworks) information drives, school-based reminders, and the shift to centralized, professionally operated community fireworks displays in LGU-designated zones. The DOH, DepEd, BFP, DILG and PNP coordinate yearly advisories and outreach; during the pandemic, DOH circulars further discouraged gatherings and individual fireworks use.

== Common types of firecrackers ==
- Bamboo cannon (boga)
- Judas's belt (Sinturon ni Hudas)
- Piccolo
- Roman candle
- Super Yolanda
  - Watusi

== See also ==
- Fireworks
- Health in the Philippines
- Firecracker (1981 film)
