= Watusi =

Watusi or Watusis may refer to one of the following:

- Tutsi, an African ethnic group
- Watusi (album), 1994 studio album by The Wedding Present
- Watusi (dance), a solo dance from the early 1960s
- Watusi (film), a 1959 film with George Montgomery and Taina Elg
- Watusi (firework), a type of firecracker
- Watusi cattle, a strain of the African Ankole (cattle)

== See also ==
- Ankole-Watusi, a modern American breed of domestic cattle.
