= Saxon (firework) =

Pyrotechnic device

The Saxon is a rapidly spinning ground-based firework that is basic in design and construction.

There are slight variations but typically the Saxon consists of two tubes which are filled with composition and have a clay plug at the end. They are joined in the centre by wooden dowel and pivot at point in the middle. It is driven by exhaust or vents located on the sides of the tube near the end plugs which are at right angles to the tube axis. Depending on the pyrotechnic compositions used, the Saxons effect can range from tight, compact circles of delicate, lacey orange sparks to huge, brilliant silver and white displays twenty feet or more in diameter. The Saxon is normally mounted on a post or structure about 10 feet from the ground.
