= Super Yolanda =

Firecracker

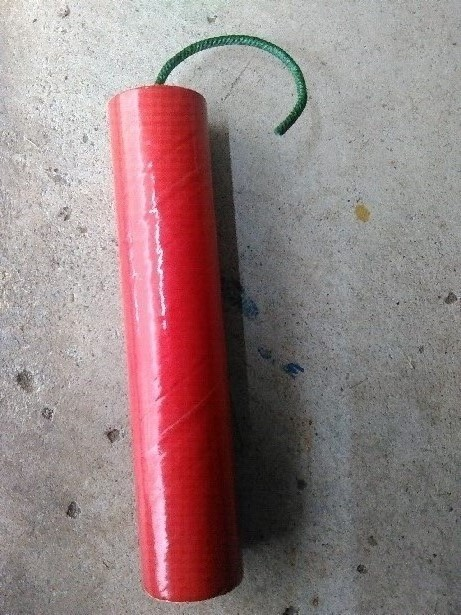
A Super Yolanda firework

Super Yolanda is a type of firecracker released in December 2013. It is named after Typhoon Haiyan, known as Super Typhoon Yolanda in the Philippines.

== Legality ==
In the Philippines, Super Yolanda is included on the list of dangerous firecrackers, according to the Department of Health. Super Yolanda is now illegal in the country.

== See also ==
- Judas' belt – another kind of firecracker
- Quarter stick
- M-1000s
