= Watusi (firework) =

Type of Christmas firework

A watusi is a type of Christmas firework that is popular in the Philippines. Its ingredients are yellow phosphorus, potassium chlorate, potassium nitrate, and trinitrotoluene.

The ingredients in the firework are highly toxic, and ingestion can lead to painful death. In particular, children have been killed by watusi fireworks after sucking on them or mistaking them for sweets. The yellow phosphorus, the most dangerous component of the watusi, may explode and rip apart the esophagus when ingested. The Department of Health is attempting to forbid watusi, because it caused hundreds of children to die of phosphorus poisoning.

== See also ==
- Piccolo (firecracker)
