= Judas's belt =

Firecracker

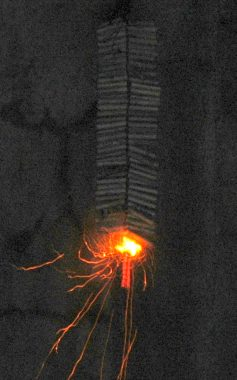
An eighty-round Judas' belt with the fuse burning, prior to exploding

A Judas' belt (also Judas's Belt, erroneously called Judah's belt) is a type of firecracker that produces multiple explosions. It is one of the most popular firecrackers in the Philippines during New Year's Eve celebrations.

== Etymology ==
Known as Sinturón ni Hudas (Tagalog for "Judas' belt", from the Spanish cinturón de Judas). the firecracker's name originates from its use in an old Catholic tradition during Holy Week in Spain and its former colonies, wherein a chain of firecrackers is strapped to a papier mache effigy of Judas Iscariot and then lit up. The explosion then burns the said effigy to ashes. This practice of burning the effigy mostly happens during Good Friday and Easter Sunday, and although it is less popular in the Philippines, the aforementioned practice is still prevalent in Spain and Mexico.

== Description ==
The firecracker consists of a number of small explosives that can be either triangular or tubular in shape, wrapped in thick paper, and arranged sequentially along a common fuse and a bigger firecracker at the other end. The small triangular explosives, also known as triángulos, each measure about 3/4 inch (19 mm) on in its longest side while tubelike ones, known as el diablos or diablos, each typically measure 1 1/4 inches (32 mm) long and 1/4 inch (6.4 mm) in diameter. The biggest firecracker at the end is usually a bawang ("garlic") or a whistle bomb, or occasionally a large triángulo.

The belt can be laid flat on the ground or suspended from a tree or wall. The end of the fuse is lit, which burns and ignites each explosive in quick succession, producing a noise similar to a machine gun.

A typical belt contains only up to one hundred or more. Its longer counterpart is called sawá, the Tagalog word for python.

== Safety ==
In the Philippines, Republic Act 7183 was enacted to regulate and to control the sale, distribution, manufacture and use of firecrackers for public safety. According to the said law, Judas's belt is a legal firecracker although bigger versions of the Judas's belt are banned.
