= Piccolo (firecracker) =

Type of firecracker

Sample piccolo packaging

Piccolo (also sold under the trade names Great Bawang, Piccolo Corsair and numerous others) is a name given to a type of firecracker in the form of a thin small cylindrical stick filled with gunpowder and lit in the same way as a match.

== Composition ==
Piccolo sticks ignite by rubbing the phosphorus-tipped head on a specially designed striking surface similar to a regular match, and can explode even on wet surfaces or underwater due to its thick cardboard shell. They are usually sold in boxes with pirate-themed artwork though variants exist with either generic or differently-themed packaging.

== Legality ==
As they are readily available and inexpensive, it has since earned notoriety as a leading cause of firecracker-related injuries in the Philippines especially among small children, either due to premature ignition or accidental ingestion. The Department of Health, along with the Bureau of Fire Protection, Philippine National Police and local government agencies, has taken steps to outlaw the sale and importation of piccolo sticks. Counterfeit and repackaged versions are being sold in flea markets and sidewalk stalls such as in Divisoria, with most bearing patently false markings such as "Made in Bulacan" and instructions in Tagalog in an attempt to disguise its origin and thus evade detection by authorities.
