= Comet (disambiguation) =

A comet is a small astronomical body which orbits the sun.

Comet or The Comet may also refer to:

== Animals ==
- Comet (fish), a marine fish
- Comet (goldfish)
- Comet moth
- Comet, the ancestor of the shorthorn cattle breed
- Species of hummingbird:
  - Bronze-tailed comet, Polyonymus caroli
  - Red-tailed comet, Sappho sparganurus
  - Grey-bellied comet, Taphrolesbia griseiventris

== Arts and entertainment ==
=== Music ===
- Comet (band), an American rock band
- Comet (The Bouncing Souls album) (2012)
- Comet (Younha album) (2007)
- "Comet" (song), an American children's song
- Comet (Firefall album) (2020)
- "Comet" (Yoasobi song) (2021)

=== Literature ===
- Comet (Archie Comics), a fictional superhero
  - Comet (Impact Comics), based on the Archie Comics character
- Comet (DC Comics), either of two fictional comic book characters
- Captain Comet, a DC Comics superhero
- Comet (Marvel Comics), a fictional character
- Comet (magazine), a US pulp science fiction magazine
- The Comet (British comics)
- The Comet (newspaper), based in Stevenage, Hertfordshire, England
- The Comet (fanzine), a science fiction fanzine
- Comet, a fictional type of magical broomstick in the Harry Potter series
- "The Comet" (short story), by W. E. B. DuBois
- Comet (book), by Carl Sagan and Ann Druyan
- Surrey Comet, a weekly local newspaper published in London
- The Daily Comet, a newspaper in Thibodaux, Louisiana

=== Roller coasters ===
- The Comet (Great Escape), in New York
- Comet (Hersheypark), in Pennsylvania
- Comet (Lincoln Park), in Massachusetts
- Comet (Waldameer), in Pennsylvania

=== Other media ===
- Comet (film), a 2014 American romantic comedy-drama
- Comets (film), a 2019 Georgian drama
- Comet (pinball), a pinball machine
- Comet (TV network), an American digital broadcast network
- Princess Comet, a Japanese TV and manga series
- "The Comet", an episode of Strange Experiences
- Comet, a dog appearing in the television series Full House
- Comet, one of Santa Claus's reindeer

== Military ==
- Comet (tank), a British armoured vehicle
- HMS Comet, any of several ships of the British Royal Navy
- USS Comet, any of several US Navy ships
- SMS Comet, two ships of the Prussian and Imperial German Navy
- Comet Line, a World War II resistance group in Belgium and France

== People ==
- Catherine Comet (born 1944), American symphony conductor
- Noah Comet (fl. 2010s), professor of English literature at the US Naval Academy
- Gale Sayers (born 1943), NFL Hall of Famer known as "The Kansas Comet"
- Dr Comet, a nickname of the comet researcher Fred Lawrence Whipple

== Places ==
=== Populated places ===
- Comet, Queensland, Australia
- Comet, Arkansas, US
- Comet, Missouri, US
- Comet, Montana, US
- Comet, North Carolina, US
- Comet, Jackson County, Ohio, US
- Comet, Summit County, Ohio, US

=== Other locations ===
- Comet River, Queensland, Australia
- Comet Mountain (British Columbia), Canada
- Mount Comet, in the Christmas Mountains of New Brunswick, Canada
- Comet Mountain, Montana, US
- Comet Peak, Nevada, US
- Comet Falls, Washington, US
- Comet Geyser, Yellowstone National Park, Wyoming, US
- Comet Galaxy, a spiral galaxy 3.2 billion light years from Earth

== Science and technology ==
- Comet (browser), an AI-powered web browser
- Comet (experiment), a Japanese particle research project
- Comet (programming), a web application model using server-push communication
- Comet (pyrotechnics), a firework component
- The "Comet" swirl chamber, used in diesel engines
- Manx comet, a type of tailless comet

== Sports and games ==
=== United States ===
- Baltimore Comets, a defunct North American Soccer League team (1974–75)
- Clinton Comets, an ice hockey team from 1927 to 1973
- Houston Comets, a defunct basketball team
- Kansas City Comets (1979–1991), a team in the original Major Indoor Soccer League
- Kansas City Comets (2001–2005), a team in the second Major Indoor Soccer League
- Kansas City Comets (2010–), a team in the Major Arena Soccer League
- Kenosha Comets, an All-American Girls Professional Baseball League team from 1943 to 1951
- Missouri Comets, a Major Indoor Soccer League team
- Mohawk Valley Comets, a former ice hockey team based in Utica, New York (1973–77)
- Mohawk Valley Comets (ACHL), a former Atlantic Coast Hockey League (1985–87)
- Mohawk Valley Comets (NEHL), a former semi-pro North Eastern Hockey League in the 2003–04 season
- Oklahoma City Comets, the current Triple-A affiliate of the Los Angeles Dodgers
- Utica Comets, an American Hockey League team
- Comets, the athletics teams and mascot of the University of Texas at Dallas
- Comets, the athletics teams and mascot of Contra Costa College in California
- Comets, the athletics teams and mascot of Olivet College in Michigan
- Comets, the athletics teams and mascot of Palomar College in California

=== Elsewhere ===
- Adelaide Comets FC, an Australian soccer club
- Allgäu Comets, an American Football team from Germany
- Dundee Comets, a Scottish ice hockey team
- Ebun Comets, a Nigerian Premier League basketball team
- IK Comet, a defunct Norwegian ice hockey team
- Workington Comets, a speedway club based in Cumbria, UK

=== Games ===
- Comet (card game), a French card game dating to the 17th century

== Transportation ==
=== Airline ===
- Air Comet, a defunct Spanish airline
- Air Comet Chile, a defunct Chilean airliner

=== Aircraft ===
- Cessna Comet, an early aircraft
- De Havilland Comet, a jet airliner
- De Havilland DH.88 Comet, a British two-seater racing aeroplane
- Dornier Komet, a German 1920s airliner
- FK-Lightplanes FK12 Comet German two seat sports/aerobatic homebuilt biplane
- Hockaday Comet, an American two-seat sports aircraft
- Ireland Comet, an American two seat biplane
- Messerschmitt Me 163 Komet, German WW2 rocket interceptor
- Speedtwin E2E Comet 1, a British aerobatic aeroplane
- Vomit Comet, a nickname for aircraft used to simulate zero gravity
- Wedell-Williams Model 44 named the Ring Free Comet, an American racing monoplane
- Yokosuka D4Y (Suisei, "Comet"), a Japanese WW2 dive bomber

=== Rail ===
- Comet (railcar)
- Community of Metros (CoMET), a rapid transit benchmarking organization
- Comet (train), of the New York, New Haven & Hartford Railroad
- Comet (interurban), a train of the Sacramento Northern Railway
- The Comet (train), a UK passenger train 1932–1962
- LDE – Comet, a 19th-century German locomotive
- South Devon Railway Comet class, a type of locomotive

=== Road ===
- GET COMET, a minibus
- Mercury Comet, an American automobile
- Comet (marque), a short-lived automobile brand
- Leyland Comet, a series of buses and trucks
- James Comet, a British motorcycle produced beginning in 1948
- Vincent Comet, a motorcycle produced in England from 1935 to 1955
- Riley Comet, a version of the Riley 4 motorcar
- The Comet (transit), a transit operator in Columbia, South Carolina
- MG Comet EV, an electric car rebadged from Wuling Air EV

=== Water ===
- Comet (ship), any of several ships
- PS Comet, a Scottish paddle steamer, operating the first European steamship service (1812)
- SS Comet, any of several American and British merchant ships
- Comet (British racing dinghy)

== Other uses ==
- Comet (retailer), a British electronics retailer
- Comet (cleanser)
- COMET – Competence Centers for Excellent Technologies, in Austria
- Comet Ping Pong, a pizzeria in Washington, D.C.
- "The Comet" (Adventure Time), a television episode

== See also ==
- Comet Lake, an Intel microprocessor family
- Comet assay, an experimental technique for measuring DNA damage
- Komet (disambiguation)
- Shavit (Hebrew for "Comet"), a space launch vehicle
