= Comet (ship) =

Many vessels have been named Comet, after the astronomical object comet.

- Comet (1791 ship) was launched at Rotherhithe. Between 1794 and 1795 she made a voyage for the British East India Company (EIC). 1812 and 1815 she was a whaler in the British southern whale fishery. Between 1823 she was a whaler in the British northern whale fishery. She then returned to cargo shipping and was wrecked on 1 December 1843.
- Dutch brig Komeet (1789) (or Comeet) was captured by the British Royal Navy in 1795, renamed HMS Penguin later that year or early the next, and sold in 1809.
- Comet (1800 Topsham ship) was built as a mercantile vessel. The British Royal Navy purchased her in 1804, renamed her HMS Spy, and sold her in 1813. She then returned to mercantile service as Comet and was last listed in 1829.
- Comet (1800 ship) was launched on the Thames. In 1801 she made a voyage under charter to the EIC. On her second voyage, in 1803, the French captured her. Still, in 1804 her previous owners were able to reacquire her. She then made another voyage for the EIC. On her return she first served as a troopship and then in the West Indies trade. She apparently was lost in 1815 or 1816.
- Comet (1810 schooner) was built at Baltimore, Maryland. Under Captain Thomas Boyle, who was a part owner of the schooner, Comet sailed from July 1812 to March 1814 as a privateer.
- Comet, built in Scotland in 1812, was the first commercially successful steamboat to operate in Europe.
- Comet (1813 steamboat) was the second steamboat to navigate the Ohio and Mississippi rivers.
- Comet (1826 ship) was launched in New Brunswick. She was wrecked on 6 May 1829 in the Torres Strait. Her crew survived.
- Comet was an American brig used in the coastwise slave trade that was blown into Bermuda in 1831; the British seized her and liberated the slaves she was carrying.
- Comet was an iron paddle boat that Lairds built in 1839 for the British East India Company's marine service.
- Comet (1846 launch) was the first known sail launch to ascend the San Joaquin River from San Francisco (1846).
- Comet (clipper) was a clipper ship launched in 1851 that was wrecked in 1865.
- Comet was a Massachusetts-built American barque that was lost in 1875 without trace while en route from New Zealand to Australia.

== See also ==
- HMS Comet, several ships of the British Royal Navy
- SMS Comet, two warships of the Prussian and Imperial German Navy
- SS Comet, several steamships
- USS Comet, several ships of the United States Navy
