= List of shipwrecks in December 1843 =

The list of shipwrecks in December 1843 includes ships sunk, foundered, wrecked, grounded, or otherwise lost during December 1843.

== 1 December ==
List of shipwrecks: 1 December 1843
Ship	State	Description
Blessing	United Kingdom	The ship was driven ashore at Southwold, Suffolk. She was on a voyage from Newcastle upon Tyne, Northumberland to Southwold. She was refloated on 4 December and taken into Southwold.
Comet	United Kingdom	The barque ran aground on the Haisborough Sands, in the North Sea off the coast of Norfolk and was abandoned by her crew. She was on a voyage from Quebec City, Province of Canada, British North America to Hull, Yorkshire. Comet was refloated the next day and beached at Great Yarmouth, Norfolk.
George Gustaff	France	The ship foundered off São Jorge Island, Azores. Her crew were rescued. She was on a voyage from Senegal to Bordeaux, Gironde.
Maria	Norway	The galeass was driven ashore and wrecked on Læsø, Denmark.

== 2 December ==
List of shipwrecks: 2 December 1843
Ship	State	Description
Belle Alliance	Belgium	The ship was wrecked off Marstrand, Norway. Her crew were rescued. She was on a voyage from Antwerp to Memel, Prussia.
Bernadotte	Sweden	The ship was driven ashore and wrecked at Allinge, Denmark. Her crew were rescued. She was on a voyage from Norrköping to Malmö.
Maria Theresa	France	The ship was driven ashore. She was on a voyage from Riga, Russia to Dunkirk, Nord. She was refloated on 4 December.
Morning Star	(United Kingdom of Great Britain and Ireland) British North America	The ship was wrecked near Petty Harbour, Newfoundland. Her crew were rescued. She was on a voyage from Prince Edward Island to Saint John's, Newfoundland.
Severn	Russia	The steamship ran aground off Læsø, Denmark. She was on a voyage from Saint Petersburg to London, United Kingdom. She was refloated and put into Gothenburg, Sweden.
Sophia	United Kingdom	The ship was driven ashore on Jura, Inner Hebrides.
Wilhelmina Sophia	Stettin	The ship struck a sunken rock off Rasvåg, Norway and was damaged She was on a voyage from Çeşme, Ottoman Empire to Stettin.
Zeno	United Kingdom	The ship was wrecked on the Blackwater Bank, in the Irish Sea off the coast of County Wexford. She was on a voyage from Liverpool, Lancashire to Jamaica.

== 3 December ==
List of shipwrecks: 3 December 1843
Ship	State	Description
Agnes	United Kingdom	The brig was wrecked at Ballyshannon, County Donegal. She was on a voyage from Cardiff, Glamorgan to Ballyshannon.
Concordia	United Kingdom	The ship ran aground on the Goodwin Sands, Kent. She was on a voyage from Newcastle upon Tyne, Northumberland to Messina, Sicily. She was refloated the next day and taken into Ramsgate, Kent for repairs.
Leda	Kingdom of Hanover	The ship was abandoned in the North Sea off Ameland, Friesland, Netherlands. She was on a voyage from Grangemouth, Stirlingshire, United Kingdom to Amsterdam, North Holland, Netherlands.
Peder and Wilhelm	Russia	The ship was in collision with Neptunus (Denmark) and sank. Her crew were rescued. She was on a voyage from Hartlepool, County Durham, United Kingdom to Odense.
Sarah	United Kingdom	The paddle tug suffered a boiler explosion and sank at Sunderland, County Durham. Her crew survived.

== 4 December ==
List of shipwrecks: 4 December 1843
Ship	State	Description
Agnes	United Kingdom	The ship was wrecked at Ballyshannon, County Galway. She was on a voyage from Cardiff, Glamorgan to Ballyshannon.
Enterprize	United Kingdom	The ship was wrecked on the Westplaat, in the North Sea off the coast of Zeeland, Netherlands. All on board were rescued. She was on a voyage from Hartlepool, County Durham to Marseille, Bouches-du-Rhône, France.
Sukhum-Kale (Сухум-Кале)	Imperial Russian Navy	The transport ship was driven ashore 1 nautical mile (1.9 km) from the Gelendzhik fortress. Her 39 crew were rescued. She was subsequently refloated.

== 5 December ==
List of shipwrecks: 5 December 1843
Ship	State	Description
Active	Norway	The ship ran aground on the Jedder, in the North Sea. Her crew were rescued. She was on a voyage from St. Ubes, Portugal to Bergen.
Alice	United Kingdom	The ship ran aground on the Doom Bar. She was refloated.
Arthur and Eleanor	United Kingdom	The ship was wrecked at Milford, County Donegal. Her crew were rescued.
Brothers	United Kingdom	The ship was wrecked on Læsø, Denmark. Her crew were rescued. She was on a voyage from Riga, Russia to Gainsborough, Lincolnshire.
Campechano	Spain	The ship was wrecked in the Straits of Bernardino. She was on a voyage from Liverpool, Lancashire, United Kingdom to Manila, Spanish East Indies.
Christina	Netherlands	The ship struck the Zoueland Bank in the North Sea off the coast of Zeeland and was damaged. She was on a voyage from Ghent, East Flanders, Belgium to Hamburg. She put back to Ghent.
Hilda Johanna	Stettin	The ship was driven ashore on Læsø. She was on a voyage from Stettin to London, United Kingdom. She was refloated and put into Helsingør.
Ibex	United Kingdom	The ship was wrecked at Port Talbot, Glamorgan. She was on a voyage from Swansea to Port Talbot.
Marietta	United Kingdom	The ship was driven ashore near "Coultorsay". She was on a voyage from Liverpool, Lancashire to Donegal. She was refloated on 13 December.
Nederlanden	Netherlands	The ship foundered in the Bristol Channel 16 nautical miles (30 km) off Milford Haven, Pembrokeshire, United Kingdom. She was on a voyage from Cardiff, Glamorgan to Dordrecht, South Holland.
Visitor	United Kingdom	The ship was driven ashore on Hog Island, County Clare.

== 6 December ==
List of shipwrecks: 6 December 1843
Ship	State	Description
Hawarden Castle	United Kingdom	The ship was driven ashore north of Fleetwood, Lancashire. She was on a voyage from Liverpool, Lancashire to London. She was refloated on 9 December and towed into Glasson Dock, Lancashire.
Scotia	United Kingdom	The ship was driven ashore at Ramsey, Isle of Man. She was refloated.
Princess Royal	United Kingdom	The steamship foundered in the North Sea off the north Norfolk coast. All on board survived. She was on a voyage from Goole, Yorkshire to London.

== 7 December ==
List of shipwrecks: December 1843
Ship	State	Description
Adams	United States	The ship was severely damaged by fire at Islesboro, Maine.
Aurora	France	The ship was wrecked at Thisted, Denmark. Her crew were rescued She was on a voyage from Dieppe, Seine-Inférieure to Frederikstad.
Carlton	United Kingdom	The ship was driven ashore at Stromness, Orkney Islands. She was on a voyage from Quebec City, Province of Canada, British North America to Aberdeen.
Hero	United Kingdom	The ship was beached at Fowey, Cornwall. She was on a voyage from Par, Cornwall to Swansea, Glamorgan.
Jane	United Kingdom	The ship foundered in the North Sea off Heligoland. Her crew were rescued. She was on a voyage from Alloa, Clackmannanshire to Hamburg.
Margaret	United Kingdom	The ship was beached in Roundston Bay. She was on a voyage from Saint John's, Newfoundland, British North America to Liverpool, Lancashire.
Marie	Denmark	The ship was wrecked on Skagen. Her crew were rescued.
Mary Ann	(United Kingdom of Great Britain and Ireland) British North America	The ship was lost at Torbay, Newfoundland. Her crew were rescued. She was on a voyage from Sydney, Nova Scotia to Halifax, Nova Scotia.
New York	United Kingdom	The ship was driven ashore at Stromness. She was on a voyage from Newcastle upon Tyne, Northumberland to Liverpool, Lancashire.
Pilotin	France	The ship was driven ashore 4 nautical miles (7.4 km) south of the mouth of the Koringa River. Her crew were rescued.
Sarah Lovett	(United Kingdom of Great Britain and Ireland) British North America	The ship capsized in the Atlantic Ocean with the ultimate loss of four of her six crew. Survivors were rescued on 22 December by Ann ( (United Kingdom of Great Britain and Ireland) British North America).

== 8 December ==
List of shipwrecks: 8 December 1843
Ship	State	Description
Ewer Flora	Denmark	The ship ran aground north of the Fornæs Lighthouse and was wrecked. She was on a voyage from Aarhus to Newcastle upon Tyne, Northumberland, United Kingdom.
Jupiter	United Kingdom	The ship was driven ashore at Ottendorf, Kingdom of Hanover. She was on a voyage from Cuxhaven to Whitby, Yorkshire.

== 9 December ==
List of shipwrecks: 9 December 1843
Ship	State	Description
Czar Dussan	Hamburg	The ship was wrecked on the Sterlsand. She was on a voyage from Çeşme, Ottoman Empire to Hamburg.
Dundee	Prussia	The ship was driven ashore and wrecked near "Schwarzorth" with the loss of three of her twelve crew. She was on a voyage from Memel to Hull, Yorkshire, United Kingdom.
Hope	United Kingdom	The ship ran aground on the Ost. She was on a voyage from Hamburg to Stockton-on-Tees, County Durham. She was refloated and put in to Cuxhaven.
James Brook	United Kingdom	The ship was driven ashore at Caister-on-Sea, Norfolk. She was on a voyage from Goole, Yorkshire to London. She was refloated.
Julia	Hamburg	The ship was wrecked on the Gelbsand, in the North Sea, with the loss of all hands. She was on a voyage from Rio de Janeiro, Brazil to Hamburg.
Jeay	Hamburg	The ship was driven ashore, capsized and sank at Stralsund.
Jupiter	United Kingdom	The ship was driven ashore near Otterndorf, Kingdom of Hanover. She was refloated on 2 February 1844 and taken in to Cuxhaven.
Konig Adolph	Rostock	The ship was driven ashore at Stralsund. She was on a voyage from Newcastle upon Tyne, Northumberland, United Kingdom to Rostock. She was refloated on 20 December and taken in to Stralsund.
Marion	United Kingdom	The ship was wrecked at Tampico, Mexico. Her crew were rescued. She was on a voyage from Liverpool, Lancashire to Tampico.
Tida Margaretha	Kingdom of Hanover	The ship was wrecked on the Accumer Bank. Her crew survived. She was on a voyage from Hartlepool, County Durham, United Kingdom to Dornum.

== 10 December ==
List of shipwrecks: 10 December 1843
Ship	State	Description
Breeze	United Kingdom	The ship ran aground on the Gunfleet Sand, in the North Sea off the coast of Essex. She was refloated and taken into Harwich with assistance from HMRC Desmond ( Board of Customs).
James	(United Kingdom of Great Britain and Ireland) British North America	The ship ran aground on the Herd Sand, in the North Sea off the coast of County Durham. She was refloated and put back to North Shields.
Peace and Plenty	(United Kingdom of Great Britain and Ireland) Isle of Man	The ship was driven onto rocks 3 nautical miles (5.6 km) south of Flamborough Head, Yorkshire. She was refloated.

== 11 December ==
List of shipwrecks: 11 December 1843
Ship	State	Description
Mary	United Kingdom	The brig was driven ashore and damaged near Sunderland, County Durham. She was on a voyage from Fécamp, Seine-Inférieure, France to Sunderland.

== 12 December ==
List of shipwrecks: 12 December 1843
Ship	State	Description
Astrea	United Kingdom	The ship foundered in the North Sea off Flamborough Head, Yorkshire. Her crew were rescued by Star (United Kingdom). She was on a voyage from Sunderland, County Durham to Portsmouth, Hampshire.
Calcutta	United Kingdom	The barque was wrecked at Breckness, Orkney Islands. Her crew were rescued. She was on a voyage from Hull, Yorkshire to Saint John, New Brunswick, British North America and Mobile, Alabama, United States.
Crusader	United Kingdom	The full-rigged ship was wrecked on the coast of Labrador, British North America with the loss of all hands. She was on a voyage from Quebec City, Province of Canada, British North America to London.
Emanuel	Kingdom of Hanover	The galiot was wrecked on the coast of Berwickshire, United Kingdom. Her crew were rescued. She was on a voyage from "St. David's", Scotland to Hamburg.
Pacific	United Kingdom	The barque ran aground on the Herd Sand, in the North Sea off the coast of County Durham. She was later refloated and resumed her voyage from North Shields, County Durham to Aberdeen.
Princess Royal	United Kingdom	The ship was driven ashore and severely damaged on Lavernock Point, Glamorgan. She was refloated and beached at Penarth.
Quebec	United Kingdom	The brig was abandoned in the Atlantic Ocean. Her crew were rescued by Sweden (United Kingdom). Quebec was on a voyage from Quebec City, Province of Canada, British North America to London.
Wulff	Flag unknown	The ship was wrecked on the Walvisch Staart Bank, in the North Sea off the coast of Zeeland, Netherlands. She was on a voyage from Bordeaux, Gironde, France to Antwerp, Belgium.

== 13 December ==
List of shipwrecks: 13 December 1843
Ship	State	Description
Arthur and Eleanor	United Kingdom	The ship sank in Mulroy Bay. Her crew were rescued. She was on a voyage from Mulroy Bay to Glasgow, Renfrewshire.
Betsy	United Kingdom	The ship struck the Rusk Bank, in the Irish Sea and was abandoned. Her crew were rescued. She was on a voyage from "Camaund" to Tralee, County Cork. Betsy was subsequently towed into South Bay in a waterlogged condition.
Crispin	United Kingdom	The ship struck a sunken rock in the Sound of Mull and was beached. She was on a voyage from Liverpool, Lancashire to South Shields, County Durham.
Drei Gebruder	Kingdom of Hanover	The ship was driven ashore near Otterøya, Norway.
Diana	United Kingdom	The smack was wrecked at Cemaes, Anglesey. Her four crew were rescued by a lifeboat.
Experiment	United Kingdom	The sloop ran aground on the Inner Barber Sand in the North Sea off the coast of Norfolk. She was on a voyage from Hull, Yorkshire to London. She was later refloated and resumed her voyage.
Gleaner	United Kingdom	The smack was wrecked at Holyhead, Anglesey. Her five crew were rescued by the lifeboat № 2 (United Kingdom).
Henry Brougham	United Kingdom	The ship was holed by her anchor and sank at Dunfanaghy, County Donegal. She was on a voyage from Glasgow to Dunfanaghy.
Lark	(United Kingdom of Great Britain and Ireland) British North America	The ship was wrecked in the Digby Gut. She was on a voyage from Shepody, New Brunswick to Saint John, New Brunswick.
Margaret Balfour	United Kingdom	The ship was wrecked on the South Breaker, off Charleston, South Carolina, United States. Her crew were rescued.
Marquis Wellington	United Kingdom	The smack was wrecked at Holyhead. Her three crew were rescued.
Michael Wickham	United Kingdom	The smack was wrecked at Holyhead. Her five crew were rescued by the lifeboat № 2 (United Kingdom).
Onderneming	Netherlands	The ship was driven ashore near Lecce, Kingdom of the Two Sicilies. She was on a voyage from Porto Re, Ottoman Empire to Marseille, Bouches-du-Rhône, France.

== 14 December ==
List of shipwrecks: 14 December 1843
Ship	State	Description
Ann	United Kingdom	The ship ran aground on the Inner Barber Sand. She was refloated and resumed her voyage.
Bess	United Kingdom	The schooner was abandoned in the North Sea off Coquet Island, Northumberland. Her crew were rescued by the brig Arethusa (United Kingdom)
Caledonia	United Kingdom	The ship was wrecked on a reef off the coast of New Caledonia with some loss of life. Fourteen crew survived, but twelve of them were subsequently murdered by the local inhabitants. The survivors were rescued by the Whaler Magnet (United Kingdom).
Francina	Hamburg	The ship ran aground on the Kopersand. She was on a voyage from Amsterdam, North Holland, Netherlands to Hamburg. She was refloated and resumed her voyage.
Sapphire	United Kingdom	The barque was driven ashore and wrecked 6 nautical miles (11 km) north of Peterhead, Aberdeenshire. She was on a voyage from Restigouche, New Brunswick, British North America to Peterhead. She was refloated on 23 December and taken into Peterhead.

== 15 December ==
List of shipwrecks: 15 December 1843
Ship	State	Description
Amethyst	United Kingdom	The ship ran aground and was wrecked near "Saltal", Denmark. Her crew were rescued. She was on a voyage from London to Gothenburg, Sweden. Amethyst became a wreck on 23 December.
Antelope	United Kingdom	The ship foundered in the North Sea off the Coquet Lighthouse, Northumberland. Her crew survived. She was on a voyage from Grangemouth, Stirlingshire to Newcastle upon Tyne, Northumberland.
Courier	United Kingdom	The ship was driven ashore near Pillau, Prussia, where she was wrecked the next day. Five of her crew were lost. She was on a voyage from Liverpool, Lancashire to Königsberg, Prussia.
Eclipse	United Kingdom	The ship was driven ashore at Otterswick, Orkney Islands.
Eleonore	Danzig	The barque was driven ashore at Pasewalk, Prussia. She had become a wreck by 30 December.
Elsa Sophia	Norway	The ship was wrecked at "Kaningoon". She was on a voyage from Riga, Russia to Stavanger.
Emanuel	United Kingdom	The ship was driven ashore and wrecked west of North Berwick, Lothian.
Four Brothers	United Kingdom	The schooner was driven ashore and severely damaged at Newhaven, Lothian. Her crew were rescued. She was refloated on 17 December and taken into Leith, Lothian.
Friends	United Kingdom	The ship was driven ashore at Otterswick.
Iacht	Denmark	The ship was wrecked on the Huideadale Reef. Her crew were rescued.
Neptune	United Kingdom	The ship struck the Salt Scars, in the North Sea off the coast of Yorkshire and foundered. Her crew were rescued. She was on a voyage from Berwick upon Tweed, Northumberland to Goole, Yorkshire.
Statire	United Kingdom	The ship was driven ashore at Therapia, Ottoman Empire. She was refloated on 20 December.

== 16 December ==
List of shipwrecks: 16 December 1843
Ship	State	Description
Anna Maria	Prussia	The ship was wrecked on Læsø, Denmark. Her crew were rescued. She was on a voyage from Newcastle upon Tyne, Northumberland, United Kingdom to "Weile".
Friedrich Wilhelm IV	Prussia	The ship was driven ashore near Kahlberg. She was on a voyage from Hull, Yorkshire, United Kingdom to Königsberg.
Mary Ann	United Kingdom	The schooner ran aground on the Herd Sand, in the North Sea off the coast of County Durham. Her crew were rescued by the North Shields Lifeboat. She was on a voyage from the River Spey to North Shields, County Durham. Mary Anne was refloated on 18 December and towed in to North Shields.
Neptunus	Prussia	The ship was driven ashore on the Prittersgebocht, in the Baltic Sea off Swinemünde. Her crew were rescued. She was on a voyage from Königsberg to Dieppe, Seine-Inférieure, France.
Theodore	France	The ship ran aground on the Tot Bank, in the English Channel.

== 17 December ==
List of shipwrecks: 17 December 1843
Ship	State	Description
Exmouth	United Kingdom	The brig was driven ashore north of Great Yarmouth, Norfolk. She was on a voyage from London to South Shields, County Durham. She was refloated.
Otto Ferdinand	Danzig	The ship was driven ashore near Marstrand, Norway. Her crew were rescued. She was on a voyage from Danzig to Liverpool, Lancashire, United Kingdom.

== 18 December ==
List of shipwrecks: 18 December 1843
Ship	State	Description
Carraboo	United Kingdom	The ship was driven ashore near "Broersen". Her crew were rescued. She was on a voyage from Riga, Russia to Chatham, Kent. She was refloated on 25 December and taken into Danzig.
Johannes	Bremen	The ship was driven ashore and wrecked on Skagen, Denmark. She was on a voyage from Quebec City, Province of Canada, British North America to Bremen.

== 19 December ==
List of shipwrecks: 19 December 1843
Ship	State	Description
Alpha	United Kingdom	The ship departed from Milford Haven, Pembrokeshire for London. No further trace, presumed foundered with the loss of all hands.
Courier	France	The steamship was driven ashore at Honfleur, Calvados. She was on a voyage from Havre de Grâce, Seine-Inférieure to Honfleur.
Elisa Sophia	Norway	The ship was wrecked at "Karringoon", Sweden. She was on a voyage from Riga, Russia to Stavanger.
Salvadore	Kingdom of the Two Sicilies	The ship was wrecked on the Blackwater Bank, in the Irish Sea. Five of her twelve crew were rescued. She was on a voyage from Liverpool, Lancashire, United Kingdom to Naples.
Perou	United States	The ship was abandoned in the Atlantic Ocean. Her crew were rescued by Felix (France). Perou was on a voyage from Boston, Massachusetts to Pernambuco, Brazil.

== 20 December ==
List of shipwrecks: 20 December 1843
Ship	State	Description
Matilde	Chile	The ship was lost south of the Chiloé Archipelago. Her crew were rescued. She was on a voyage from Valparaíso to the River Plate.
Venelia	France	The ship was wrecked near Grand-Gosier, Haiti. Her crew were rescued. She was on a voyage from Saint Thomas to Saint Domingo.

== 21 December ==
List of shipwrecks: 21 December 1843
Ship	State	Description
Arab	United Kingdom	The ship was driven ashore at Bideford, Devon. She was on a voyage from Quebec City, Province of Canada, British North America to Bideford. She was refloated on 4 January 1844 and taken in to Appledore, Devon.
Marys	United Kingdom	The ship ran aground on the "Woolsenus". She was refloated and taken into Portsmouth, Hampshire.

== 22 December ==
List of shipwrecks: 22 December 1843
Ship	State	Description
Alice	United Kingdom	The sloop foundered in the North Sea off East Wemyss, Fife. Her crew were rescued by a fishing vessel. She was on a voyage from Middlesbrough, Yorkshire to Leith, Lothian.
Betsey	United Kingdom	The ship was run into by Albion ( (United Kingdom of Great Britain and Ireland) British North America in the Irish Sea off Holyhead, Anglesey. Her crew were rescued by Albion. Betsey was on a voyage from Liverpool, Lancashire to Dublin. She was taken into Annalong, County Down on 24 December.
Duchess of Gloucester	United Kingdom	The ship was driven ashore and wrecked at Portishead, Somerset. She was on a voyage from Teignmouth, Devon to Gloucester.
Jane	United Kingdom	The ship ran aground at Knock Head, Aberdeenshire. She was on a voyage from Portgordon to Aberdeen. She was refloated but consequently foundered. Her crew were rescued.

== 23 December ==
List of shipwrecks: 23 December 1843
Ship	State	Description
Alfred	United Kingdom	The ship was wrecked near Wexford with the loss of her captain. She was on a voyage from the Charente to Liverpool, Lancashire.
Ann	United Kingdom	The ship ran aground on the Horse Bank, in Liverpool Bay. She was refloated and completed her voyage to Liverpool.
Betsy	United Kingdom	The ship collided with Albion (United Kingdom and was abandoned in the Irish Sea. Her crew were rescued. She was on a voyage from Runcorn, Cheshire to Dublin.
Dorothy	United Kingdom	The sloop was in collision with Jane (United Kingdom and foundered in the North Sea off the mouth of the River Tees. Two crew were rescued. Dorothy was on a voyage from King's Lynn, Norfolk to Sunderland, County Durham.
Enchantress	United Kingdom	The ship departed from Valaparaíso, Chile for Swansea, Glamorgan. No further trace, presumed foundered with the loss of all hands.
Figaro	Bremen	The ship ran ashore on Eierland, North Holland, Netherlands and sank. Her crew were rescued. She was on a voyage from Cuba to Bremen.
Glasgow	United Kingdom	The ship ran aground in the Mississippi River. She was on a voyage from New Orleans, Louisiana, United States to Liverpool.
Jules Theodore	France	The ship struck the Minquiers, off the Channel Islands and was damaged. She was on a voyage from Bordeaux, Gironde to Saint-Malo, Ille-et-Vilaine. She put into Jersey in a leaky condition.
Margaret and Jane	United Kingdom	The ship was in collision with another vessel and was consequently beached near South Shields, County Durham. She was repaired and resumed her voyage on 30 December.
Planter	United Kingdom	The ship capsized in the River Don at Goole, Yorkshire. Her crew were rescued. She was on a voyage from Goole to London. Planter was righted on 25 December.
William	United Kingdom	The ship ran aground off Coquet Island, Northumberland and was abandoned by her crew. She was on a voyage from Berwick upon Tweed, Northumberland to Sunderland. She was later refloated and taken into Warkworth, Northumberland.

== 24 December ==
List of shipwrecks: 24 December 1843
Ship	State	Description
Alpet	France	The brig was driven ashore and wrecked in Ballyteague Bay with the loss of her captain. She was on a voyage from the Charente to Liverpool, Lancashire, United Kingdom.
Nabob	United Kingdom	The barque ran ashore in Carnarvon Bay in fog. Her crew were rescued. She was on a voyage from Calcutta, India to Liverpool, Lancashire. Nabob was refloated on 6 February 1844. On 8 March she was taken to Holyhead, Anglesey, and later repaired.
Waterwitch	United Kingdom	The ship ran aground on the Insand, in the North Sea off the coast of County Durham. She was on a voyage from Agrigento, Sicily to South Shields, County Durham. She was run into by another vessel, which both damaged and refloated her.

== 25 December ==
List of shipwrecks: 25 December 1843
Ship	State	Description
Boykett	United Kingdom	The brig capsized in the Clyde. She was later righted.
Pelorus	United Kingdom	The ship was wrecked on Ambon Island, Spanish East Indies. Her crew were rescued. She was on a voyage from Calcutta, India to China.
Salvadora or Salvatore	Kingdom of the Two Sicilies	The brig was wrecked on the Blackwater Bank, in Liverpool Bay, with the loss of seven of her twelve crew. She was on a voyage from Liverpool, Lancashire, United Kingdom to Naples.
Swiftsure	United Kingdom	The ship ran aground on the Burbo Bank, in Liverpool Bay. She was on a voyage from Liverpool, Lancashire to Africa. She was refloated an put back to Liverpool in a leaky condition.

== 26 December ==
List of shipwrecks: 26 December 1843
Ship	State	Description
Eliza	United Kingdom	The ship was wrecked on Heneaga, Bahamas. Her crew were rescued. She was on a voyage from Aux Cayes, Haiti to Cork.
Margaret	United Kingdom	The ship was damaged by fire at Glasgow, Renfrewshire.
Norfolk	United Kingdom	The ship was driven ashore at Malta. She was refloated.

== 27 December ==
List of shipwrecks: 27 December 1843
Ship	State	Description
Jane Gifford	United Kingdom	The barque struck rocks off the Little Bassa and was damaged. She was abandoned on 27 December 8 nautical miles (15 km) off Tangalle, Ceylon. She was on a voyage from Madras to Covelong and Bombay, India.
Meg	United Kingdom	The ship caught fire at Liverpool, Lancashire and was scuttled.
Potter	United Kingdom	The ship was wrecked on the Pratas or Pirates Shoal, in the South China Sea. She was on a voyage from Tuticorin, India to Macao.
Sir James Gordon	United Kingdom	The ship was driven ashore at Cape la Have, Seine-Inférieure, France. She was on a voyage from Havre de Grâce, Seine-Inférieure to Newcastle upon Tyne, Northumberland. She was refloated and taken in to Havre de Grâce for repairs.

== 28 December ==
List of shipwrecks: 28 December 1843
Ship	State	Description
Amicitia	Netherlands	The ship was wrecked near Cape Spartel, Morocco. She was on a voyage from Amsterdam, North Holland to Constantinople, Ottoman Empire.
Bedlington	United Kingdom	The ship was driven ashore at South Shields, County Durham.
George Gustave	France	The ship foundered in the Atlantic Ocean off São Jorge Island, Azores. Her crew were rescued. She was on a voyage from Saint-Louis, Senegal to Bordeaux, Gironde.

== 29 December ==
List of shipwrecks: 29 December 1844
Ship	State	Description
Eliza and Esther	United Kingdom	The ship ran aground on the North Bank, in Liverpool Bay. She was on a voyage from Larne, County Antrim to Liverpool, Lancashire.
Mariner	United Kingdom	The ship was abandoned in the Atlantic Ocean. Her crew were rescued. She was on a voyage from Saint John, New Brunswick, British North America to Dublin.

== 30 December ==
List of shipwrecks: 30 December 1844
Ship	State	Description
Albion	United Kingdom	The ship ran aground at Redcar, Yorkshire. She was on a voyage from Boston, Lincolnshire to Stockton on Tees, County Durham. She was refloated.
John and William	United Kingdom	The ship ran aground on the Maplin Sand, in the North Sea off the coast of Essex. She was on a voyage from Blyth, Northumberland to London. She was refloated the next day.
Maria	Hamburg	The ship foundered in the North Sea off the mouth of the Ems.
Mary	United Kingdom	The ship sprang a leak and foundered in the North Sea off Dunstanburgh Castle, Northumberland. Her crew were rescued by Choice (United Kingdom. Mary was on a voyage from North Shields, County Durham to Newton.
Rachel Kleist	Prussia	The steamship was beached near "Settersdorf" where she subsequently became a wreck.

== 31 December ==
List of shipwrecks: 31 December 1843
Ship	State	Description
Balguerie	France	The ship was wrecked on the English Bank, off the coast of Uruguay, Her crew were rescued. She was on a voyage from Bordeaux, Gironde to Montevideo, Uruguay.
John and Mary	United Kingdom	The ship ran aground on the Maplin Sand, in the North Sea off the coast of Essex.
Madras	United Kingdom	The barque ran aground at Adelaide, South Australia.
Rose	United Kingdom	The ship foundered in the Bristol Channel 6 nautical miles (11 km) south of Lundy Island, Devon. Her crew were rescued. She was on a voyage from Newport, Monmouthshire to Rouen, Seine-Inférieure, France.

== Unknown date ==
List of shipwrecks: Unknown date in December 1843
Ship	State	Description
Anna Margaretha	Hamburg	The ship was driven ashore and wrecked on Sylt, Duchy of Holstein before 9 December. Her crew were rescued. She was on a voyage from Saint Petersburg, Russia to Hamburg.
Aurora	United Kingdom	The ship ran aground off Læsø, Denmark. She was on a voyage from Uusikaupunki, Grand Duchy of Finland to London. She was refloated and taken in to Copenhagen, Denmark.
Canton	United Kingdom	The brig was lost on the coast on North America before 21 December.
Caroline Cecilie Paulina	Denmark	The ship was driven ashore near "Waarsaa". She was refloated on 19 December and taken in to Fredrikshavn.
Diana	Hamburg	The ship foundered in the North Sea before 4 December. Her crew were rescued by Enterprise (United Kingdom). Diana was on a voyage from Grangemouth, Stirlingshire United Kingdom to Hamburg.
Franklin	United Kingdom	The ship ran aground at Liverpool, Lancashire before 31 December.
Haddington	United Kingdom	The ship was wrecked in the Strait of Magellan with the loss of all hands.
Helen	Kingdom of Hanover	The ship was abandoned in the North Sea off Ameland, Friesland, Netherlands on or before 3 December. She was on a voyage from Grangemouth to Amsterdam, North Holland, Netherlands.
Lunar	(United Kingdom of Great Britain and Ireland) New Zealand	The brig was wrecked on the coast of Middle Island. Her crew survived.
Maria	Sweden	The ship foundered off the coast of Norway before 9 December. Her crew were rescued. She was on a voyage from Gothenburg to Newcastle upon Tyne, Northumberland, United Kingdom.
Marianna Paulina	Hamburg	The ship was driven ashore on the coast of Jutland.
Mary	United Kingdom	The ship was driven ashore in the Dardanelles before 13 December. She was refloated.
Montefiores	United Kingdom	The ship was driven ashore at Gallipoli, Ottoman Empire before 23 December. She had been refloated by 27 December.
Neerlands Frau	Netherlands	The ship foundered in the Bristol Channel. She was on a voyage from Rotterdam, South Holland to Nantes, Loire-Inférieure.
Rochester Castle	United Kingdom	The ship was driven ashore on Föhr, Duchy of Holstein.
Salamandre	France	The ship was driven ashore at Frontignan, Hérault before 15 December. She was on a voyage from Marseille, Bouches-du-Rhône to Cette, Hérault. She was refloated and taken into Cette.
Sheridan Grange	United Kingdom	The ship ran aground on the Shipwash Sand, in the North Sea off the coast of Essex. She was refloated with assistance from the smack Fox (United Kingdom) and HMRC Scout ( Board of Customs).
Tempest	United Kingdom	The ship foundered off the coast of Denmark before 28 December.
The 17th of Mai	Norway	The schooner was wrecked off Sørnes before 19 December with the loss of all hands.
