= Komet =

Komet is the word for comet in some languages and may refer to:

In the military:

- Messerschmitt Me 163 Komet, the first rocket-powered crewed aircraft
- German auxiliary cruiser Komet, a ship in World War II
- KS-1 Komet, a Soviet anti-ship missile
- HMAS Una, a Royal Australian Navy sloop, formerly the German motor launch Komet

In transportation:

- Dornier Komet, a family of aircraft manufactured in Germany in the 1920s
- Komet (American automobile), made only in 1911
- Komet (German automobile), produced between 1922 and 1924
- Komet (train), a former overnight train service between Germany and Switzerland

In sports:

- SC Komet Berlin, a Berlin sports club from the late 1890s to the late 1930s
- TuS Komet Arsten, a German football club established in 2006
- Fort Wayne Komets, a minor league ice hockey team

In literature:

- Der Komet, a 2023 novel by Durs Grünbein

In music:

- Komet, the tenth studio album by the German band Megaherz
- "Komet" (song), a 2023 song by Udo Lindenberg and Apache 207

People:

- Gürkan Coşkun (born 1941), a Turkish painter
- Frank Bretschneider (born 1956), a German electronic musician

== See also ==
- Comet (disambiguation)
