= Bewl Valley Sailing Club =

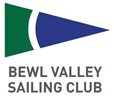
- Folded: 2015
- Location: Bewl Water, Lamberhurst; Near Tunbridge Wells; Kent
- Members: 1,097 (2011–12); 1,151 (2010–11)

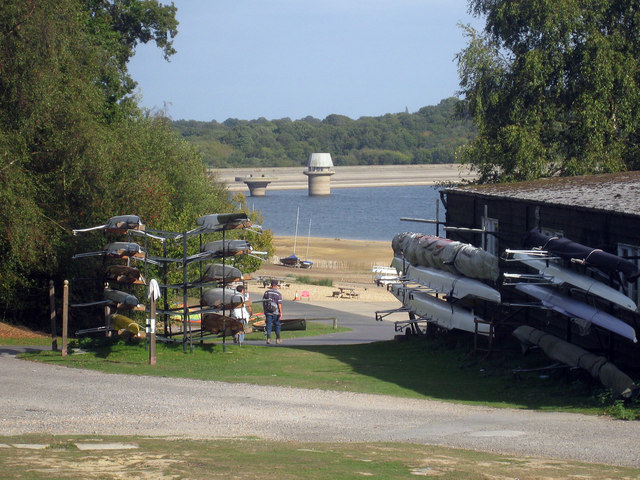

Bewl Valley Sailing Club was a sailing dinghy and windsurfing club that had approximately 920 full members (1,400 capacity), but entered into insolvency administration in 2015 and closed. Its former premises at Bewl Water are now occupied by the site's current tenant, the Markerstudy Group.

== Description ==
It was affiliated to the Royal Yachting Association and was a registered RYA Training Centre. The club formerly organised safety boat cover for sailing and windsurfing every Saturday and Sunday throughout the year. The purpose-built water sports club house was leased by Bewl Valley Sailing Club and its facilities are shared with Bewl Bridge Rowing Club and Bewl Canoe Club. In July 2010, the club was awarded £10,000 by Sport England that was to be spent towards purchasing new training dinghies.

== Insolvency ==
On 16 July 2015 the club went into administration. Previously, on 20 June 2015 the club had issued a notice of intention to appoint an administrator.

== Location ==
The former clubhouse is situated at Bewl Water on the north side of the reservoir near Lamberhurst, Kent. Bewl Water has up to 700 acres of sailing area if all of the estuaries and inlets are included. Most members sailed in the 200–250 acre area south of the club house and launch slipways. The surrounding Kent High Weald countryside is part of a designated Area of Outstanding Natural Beauty. Bewl Water reservoir is the largest stretch of open water in the South East and when full can hold more than 31,000 million litres of water. The reservoir offers one of the few large recreational open spaces in south east England located in a tranquil setting where there is virtually no background traffic noise. It can be accessed from the A21 Its former premises at Bewl Water are now occupied by the site's current tenant, the Markerstudy Group.

== History ==
Bewl Valley Sailing Club was founded in 1967 but no sailing took place until 1977 due to Bewl Water reservoir being under construction, lined with clay and then filled from the River Medway and local bore holes. In 2008, the Mariners of Bewl (MOB), an integrated sailing club for the physically disabled and able bodied elected to combine with Bewl Valley Sailing Club.

== Club racing and open events ==
There was organised fleet racing on Sundays for Lasers, Solos and Flying Fifteens in addition to Slow and Fast Handicap fleets. Other classes of boats regularly sailed at the club included the RS400, Topper, Optimist and Enterprise dinghies.

Bewl Valley Sailing Club hosted a number of inland open meetings each year including events for Solos, Phantoms, Comets, Laser 2000s, Laser Vagos, Wanderers, Flying Fifteens and the London Windsurf Association.

== General sailing ==
In addition to general sailing on Saturdays and Sundays, the club was open on Wednesday evenings from May to August and on each of the four summer Bank Holiday Mondays. During the month of August, the club house was open every day and safety boat cover was provided, except during Youth Week during which there was no club sailing for ordinary members. Members also organised Away Cruises on tidal waters such as to Bradwell in Essex. The Midweekers, an informal group of members met each Wednesday to sail or take part in another outdoor activity.

== Social events ==
Family week ran for more than 20 years. The event was organised voluntarily by club members and offers a full programme of water and land based activities including evening entertainment in the club house. Each summer some 250 family members camped onsite during the first week of the school holidays at the end of July (22–28 July 2012). The club held two camping weekends during 2012 (4–7 May & 25–27 May). In addition the club held its annual Family open day on Saturday 21 July 2012, when there were to be opportunities to "have a go" at Windsurfing & Sailing.
