= Edgar Christopher Cookson =

Royal Navy officer & VC recipient (1883-1915)

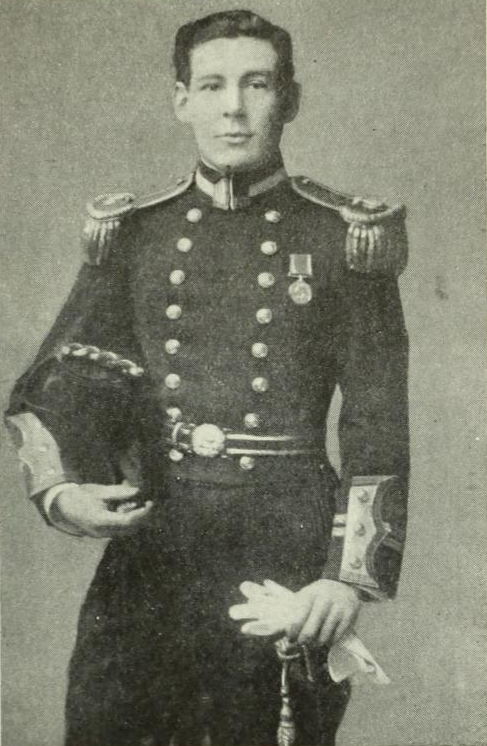
- Born: 13 December 1883; Tranmere, Cheshire
- Died: 28 September 1915 (aged 31) † near Kut, Mesopotamia
- Burial place: Amara War Cemetery, Iraq
- Military career
- Allegiance: United Kingdom
- Branch: Royal Navy
- Rank: Lieutenant-Commander
- Units: HMS Comet
- Conflicts: Boxer Rebellion; World War I †
- Awards: Victoria Cross; Distinguished Service Order

Lieutenant-Commander Edgar Christopher Cookson VC DSO (13 December 1883 – 28 September 1915) was an English recipient of the Victoria Cross, the highest and most prestigious award for gallantry in the face of the enemy that can be awarded to British and Commonwealth forces.

Cookson was born on 13 December 1883 to Capt. W. E. Cookson, R.N. He was 31 years old and a Lieutenant-Commander in the command of HMS Comet on the River Tigris when his actions, on 28 September 1915, during the advance on Kut-el-Amara, Mesopotamia earned him the Victoria Cross. He was shot several times by the enemy that day, and died within a few minutes.

== Citation ==
On 28 September 1915, the river gunboat "Comet" had been ordered with other gunboats to examine and, if possible, destroy an obstruction placed across the river by the Turks. When the gunboats were approaching the obstruction a very heavy rifle and machine gun fire was opened on them from both banks. An attempt to sink the centre dhow of the obstruction by gunfire having failed, Lieutenant-Commander Cookson ordered the "Comet" to be placed alongside, and himself jumped onto the dhow with an axe and tried to cut the wire hawsers connecting it with the two other craft forming the obstruction. He was immediately shot in several places and died within a very few minutes.

— The Edinburgh Gazette, 25 January 1916.
