= Comet (comics) =

Comet, in comics, may refer to:

- Comet (Archie Comics), an Archie Comics character
- Comet (DC Comics), a number of DC Comics characters
- Comet (Impact Comics), an Impact Comics character
- Comet (Marvel Comics), a Marvel Comics character
- The Comet (comic magazine), a British publication

== See also ==
- Comet (disambiguation)
- Captain Comet
