= Roman candle (firework) =

Firework that ejects stars or exploding shells

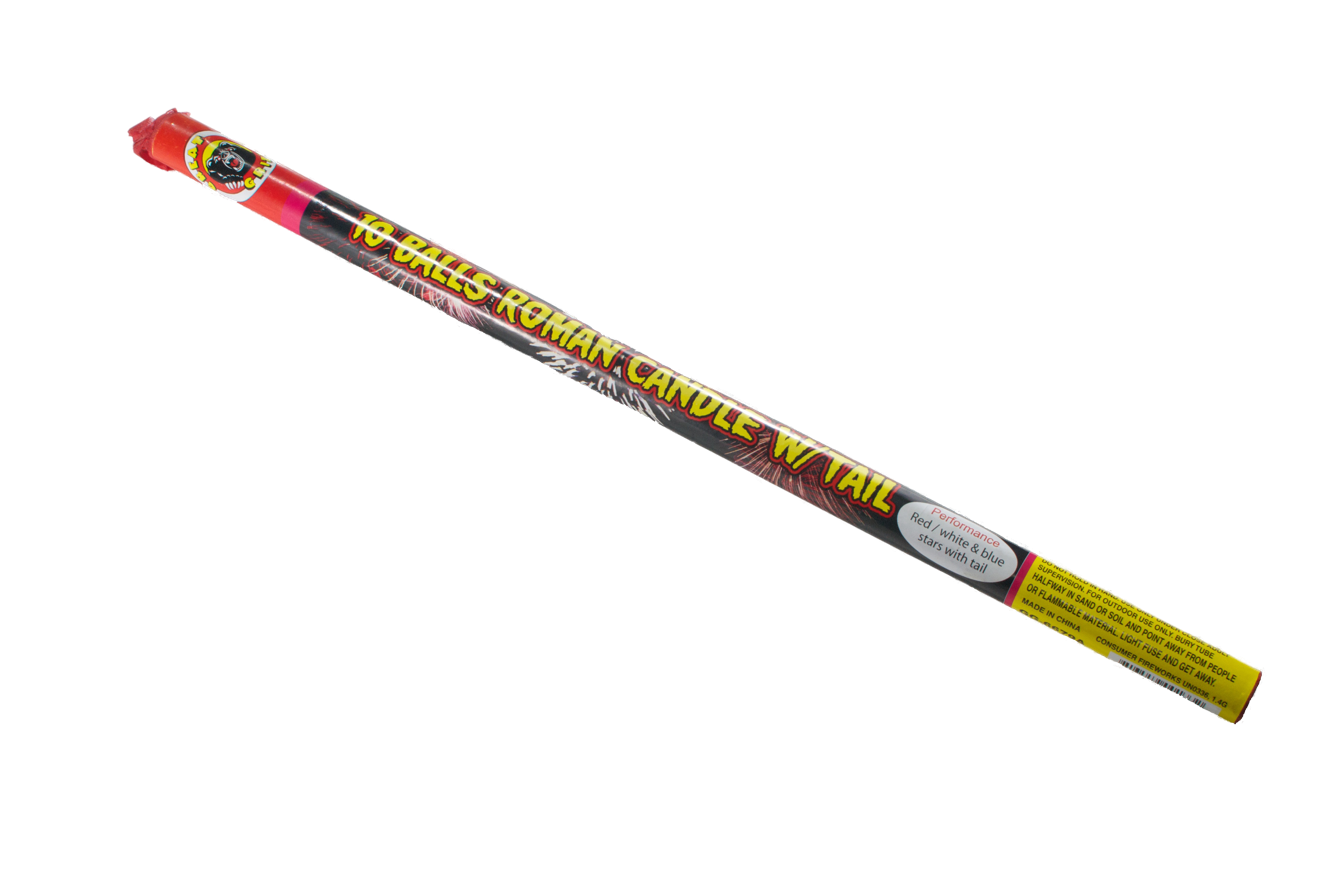
Roman candle firework by Great Grizzly

A Roman candle is a traditional type of firework that ejects one or more stars or exploding shells. Roman candles come in a variety of sizes, from 6 mm (0.24 in) diameter for consumers, up to 8 cm (3.1 in) diameter in professional fireworks displays.

Roman candles are banned in some countries as they have a tendency to malfunction. They are banned in Finland and the Netherlands, and illegal to possess or set off in the U.S. states of California, Delaware, Florida, Maryland, Massachusetts, Minnesota, New Jersey, New York, North Carolina, Oregon, and Rhode Island.

== Construction and ignition ==
A Roman Candle being fired during New Year's Eve 2020 in Merdeka Square, Jakarta, Indonesia

Roman candles are fireworks constructed with bentonite, lifting charge, pyrotechnic star, black powder, and delay charge. The device is ignited from the top, which should be pointed into the sky, away from people. The delay powder is packed tightly in the tube, so that the flame cannot reach around the sides of the plug of delay composition. It therefore burns slowly; as it is consumed, the flame moves down through the tube. When the flame reaches the topmost pyrotechnic star, the star is ignited. Because the star fits loosely in the tube, the fire spreads around it and ignites the lift charge. The lift charge burns quickly, propelling the star out of the tube. In doing so it also ignites the layer of delay powder beneath it, and the process repeats. There are several variations on this:

- Many Chinese Roman candles use clay instead of delay powder and run a length of fuse down the inside of the candle to time the lifts.
- Larger Roman candles (three-inch diameter or more) usually add more lift to the highest layers and less to the lower layers in order to cause the stars to lift to the same altitude. This is due to the shorter length of tube available for accelerating the higher stars (see firearms internal ballistics).
- Some very large Roman candles load comet shells instead of stars.

== Star colors and chemistry ==
The stars of Roman candles can be found in a variety of colors. Colors are manipulated by adding compounds which, when ignited, release visible light and other radiation. For example, when potassium perchlorate (KClO_{4}) is used as an oxidizer, chemical reactions involving the dissociated elements of the perchlorate—potassium and chlorine ions—create barium compounds which emit green light (especially BaCl_{2}). The potassium compounds formed by this reaction emit mostly near-infrared light, and so they do not affect the color of the star in a significant way. This reaction occurs at temperatures exceeding 2,500 °C (4,500 °F), at which the ions in KCl dissociate into free K^{+} and Cl^{−}. Alternatively, SrCO_{3} can be added to the candle to produce a red or pink star, but, because it does not oxidize, more oxidizers and fuels must be added to sustain combustion. During combustion, various strontium compounds (especially Sr(OH)_{2}) emit red light, most of which is between 506 and 722 nm in wavelength.

== See also ==
- Tezutsu-hanabi
