= Comet Peak =

Mountain in Nevada, United States

Coordinates: 37°53′54″N 114°35′09″W

Comet Peak is a mountain peak in Lincoln County, Nevada, United States. The peak is 9,341 feet in elevation.

== See also ==
- Comet (disambiguation)
