= Rader Creek, Montana =

- Census-designated place
- Location within Montana Location within the United States
- Coordinates: 45°50′44″N 112°18′58″W
- Country: United States
- State: Montana
- County: Jefferson

Area
  - Total: 20.25 sq mi (52.45 km^{2})
  - Land: 20.25 sq mi (52.45 km^{2})
  - Water: 0 sq mi (0.00 km^{2})
- Elevation: 5,532 ft (1,686 m)

Population (2020)
  - Total: 341
  - Density: 17/sq mi (6.5/km^{2})
- Time zone: UTC-7 (Mountain (MST))
  - Summer (DST): UTC-6 (MDT)
- Area code: 406
- FIPS code: 30-60450
- GNIS feature ID: 2583837

Rader Creek is a census-designated place (CDP) in Jefferson County, Montana, United States. As of the 2020 census, Rader Creek had a population of 341.

== Geography ==
The CDP is in southwestern Jefferson County and is sparsely settled. An unincorporated place named Nineteen Mile is along Montana Highway 2 in the western part of the CDP, and Cactus Junction, at the intersection of MT 2 and MT 41, is at the eastern border of the CDP. MT 2 (former U.S. Route 10) leads east 11 miles (18 km) to Whitehall and northwest 20 miles (32 km) to Butte, while MT 41 leads south 23 miles (37 km) to Twin Bridges.

According to the U.S. Census Bureau, the Rader Creek CDP has an area of 20.3 square miles (52.5 km^{2}), all land. Rader Creek, the community's namesake, flows out of mountains to the northwest near the Continental Divide, joining Little Pipestone Creek in the east part of the CDP. The creeks are part of the Jefferson River watershed, eventually flowing to the Missouri River.

== Demographics ==
Historical population
Census	Pop.	Note	%±
2020	341		—
U.S. Decennial Census

== Education ==
Whitehall Public Schools has two components: Whitehall Elementary School District and Whitehall High School District. The school districts for the community are Whitehall Elementary School District and Whitehall High School District.
