= Louisville, Montana =

American ghost town

Coordinates: 46.5627°N 111.7958°W

Louisville is a ghost town located in Mineral County, Montana. Originally known as Louisville, the community began as a mining camp in the late-1800s, the town was inhabited by Chinese-American immigrants after being abandoned by its initial founders. The settlement was subject to a 2008 archeological dig by the University of Montana, during which numerous artifacts were uncovered originating from its Chinese-American inhabitants.

== History ==
Louisville was originally named Louiseville, and was established as a mining camp along Cedar Creek in Mineral County, Montana circa 1869. The settlement was named for miner Louis Barrette's wife, Louise. The town's construction was "rushed" and its design not well-planned, exhibiting as "a town built overnight." An account of its design published in The New Northwest in June 1870 noted that: "Louiseville is a City, with streets 20 feet (20 feet (6.1 m)) wide, and cabins, shanties, and shelters perched on every spot, and men as densely thronged as in a bivouac."

After the encampment was largely abandoned circa 1870, Chinese immigrants inhabited the town after fleeing from the bordering Idaho. A newspaper account of the town in 1874 notes that it had by that time been largely been abandoned: "The lumber and logs off the old town of Louisville [sic] have pretty much been utilized in building flumes. There are three souls and a ghost in Louisville."

Scholar Christopher Merritt notes in his 1995 thesis that "Louiseville quickly faded into memory and derelict buildings predominated by the mid-1870s, yet the Chinese staked a relatively permanent presence in the drainage now known as China Gulch, directly adjacent to the town. China Gulch is an ephemeral drainage running into Cedar Creek from the northeast, and from the name, it seems that this might have been the center of the Chinese population in the area around Louiseville."

=== 2008 archeological dig ===
In 2008, the University of Montana performed archeological digs of the former settlement, unearthing hearths, opium tins, ceramic pottery, calligraphy stones, bottles, and numerous soup bones at the site.

== Sources ==
- Merritt, Christopher (1995). The Cedar Creek Chinese Report on Excavations at 24MN249 & 24MN262 (PDF) (Thesis) (Revised, 2007 ed.). University of Montana. pp. 1–79. Archived (PDF) from the original on May 14, 2021.
