= Hellenism (neoclassicism) =

Art movement

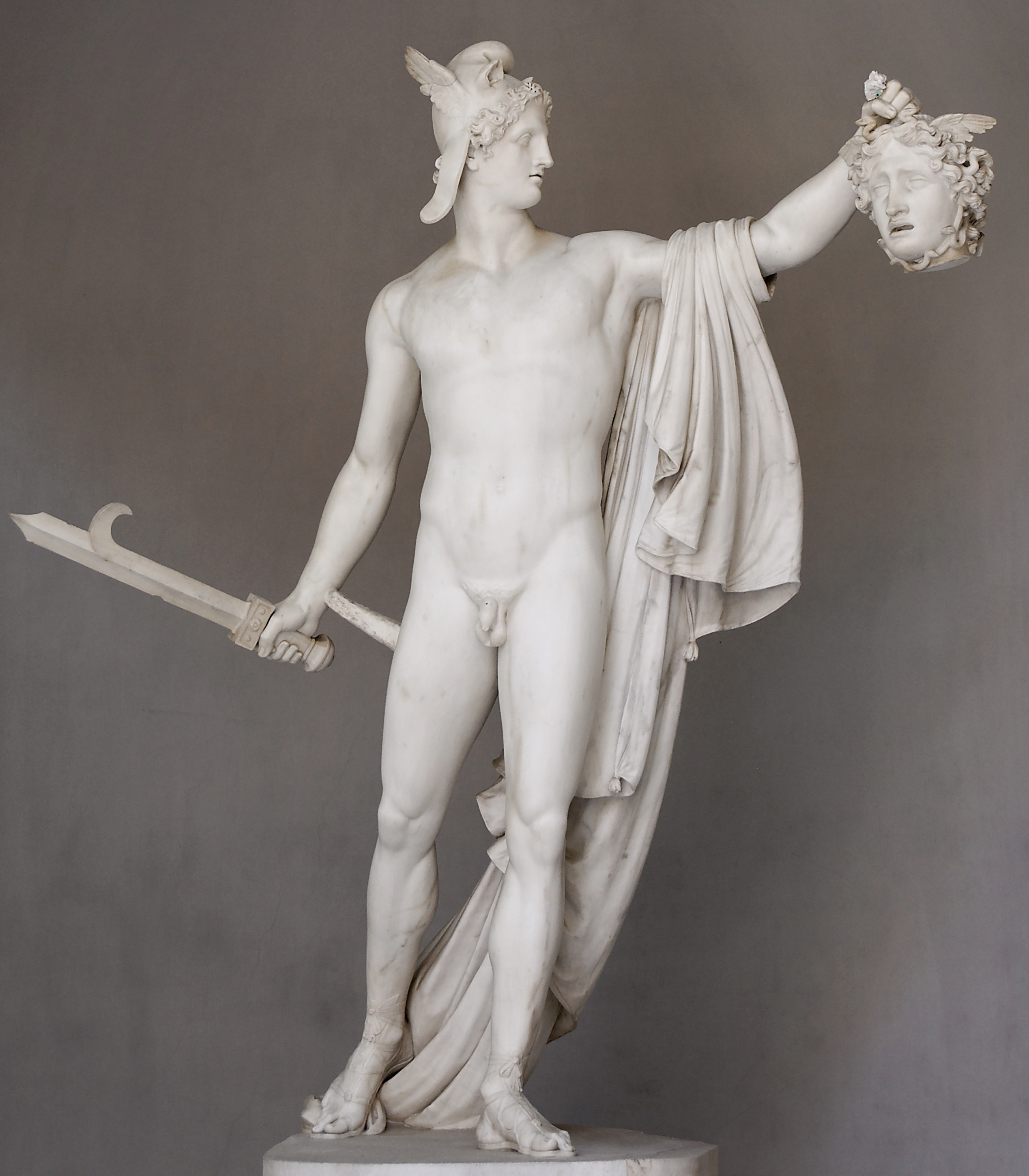
Perseus Holding the Head of Medusa, Antonio Canova, Museo Pio-Clementino, Vatican.

Neoclassical Hellenism is a term introduced primarily during the European Romantic era by Johann Joachim Winckelmann.

== Background ==
As a neoclassical movement distinct from other Roman or Greco-Roman forms of neoclassicism emerging after the European Renaissance, it most often is associated with Germany and England in the eighteenth and nineteenth centuries. In Germany, the preeminent figure in the movement was Winckelmann, the art historian and aesthetic theoretician who first articulated what would come to be the orthodoxies of the Greek ideal in sculpture (though he only examined Roman copies of Greek statues, and was murdered before setting foot in Greece). For Winckelmann, the essence of Greek art was noble simplicity and sedate grandeur, often encapsulated in sculptures representing moments of intense emotion or tribulation. Other major figures include Hegel, Schlegel, Schelling and Schiller.

== Hellenism in the English Romantic period ==
In England, the so-called "second generation" Romantic poets, especially John Keats, Percy Bysshe Shelley, and Lord Byron are considered exemplars of Hellenism. Drawing from Winckelmann (either directly or derivatively), these poets frequently turned to Greece as a model of ideal beauty, transcendent philosophy, democratic politics, and homosociality or homosexuality (for Shelley especially). Women poets, such as Mary Robinson, Felicia Hemans, Letitia Elizabeth Landon and Elizabeth Barrett Browning were also deeply involved in retelling the myths of classical Greece.

== Philhellenism during the nineteenth century ==
In the early nineteenth century, during the Greek War of Independence, many foreign parties--including prominent Englishmen such as Lord Byron--offered zealous support for the Greek cause. This particular brand of Hellenism, pertaining to modern rather than ancient Greece, has come to be called philhellenism. Byron was perhaps the best-known philhellene; he died in Missolonghi while preparing to fight for the Greeks against the Ottoman Turks. Books like 'The Picture of Dorian Gray' feature this new Hellenism in terms of aesthetic appreciation.

== Hellenism in the art and architecture of the 19th century ==
In art and architecture, the Greek influence saw a zenith in the early nineteenth century, following from a Greek Revival that began with archaeological discoveries in the eighteenth century, and that changed the look of buildings, gardens and cemeteries (among other things) in England and continental Europe. This movement also inflected the worlds of fashion, interior design, furniture-making--even hairstyles. In painting and sculpture, no single event was more inspiring for the movement of Hellenism than the removal of the Parthenon Marbles from Greece to England by Lord Elgin. The English government purchased the Marbles from Elgin in 1816 and placed them in the British Museum, where they were seen by generations of English artists. Elgin's activities caused a controversy that continues to this day.

== Victorian period ==
The Victorian period saw new forms of Hellenism, none more famous than the social theory of Matthew Arnold in his book, Culture and Anarchy (published as a book in 1869). For Arnold, Hellenism was the opposite of Hebraism. The former term stood for "spontaneity," and for "things as they really are"; the latter term stood for "strictness of conscience," and for "conduct and obedience." Human history, according to Arnold, oscillated between these two modes. Other major figures include Swinburne, Pater, Wilde, and Symonds.

== Rosewater Hellenism ==
Rosewater Hellenism was the opprobrious term applied in the late 19th century to an over-idealised form of neoclassical writing. The bland Arcadia such writings presented was echoed pictorially in the art of Puvis de Chavannes, who in turn influenced the early Picasso of the Blue Period.

Twentieth century instances of Rosewater Hellenism include some of the lesser poems of Cavafy, as well as the blander nudes of Willem de Kooning.

== See also ==
- Parnassian School
- Maillol

== Bibliography ==
- Anderson, Warren D. Matthew Arnold and the Classical Tradition. Ann Arbor: University of Michigan Press, 1965.
- Aske, Martin. Keats and Hellenism: An Essay. Cambridge: Cambridge University Press, 1985.
- Bate, Walter Jackson. The Burden of the Past and the English Poet. Cambridge: Harvard University Press, 1970.
- Bloom, Harold. The Anxiety of Influence: A Theory of Poetry. London: Oxford University Press, 1973.
- Bush, Douglas. Mythology and the Romantic Tradition in English Poetry. Boston: Harvard University Press, 1937.
- Butler, E. M. The Tyranny of Greece over Germany. London: Cambridge University Press, 1935; rpt. 1958.
- Butler, Marilyn. "Myth and Mythmaking in the Shelley Circle," in Shelley Revalued, ed. Kelvin Everest. Totowa, NJ: Barnes & Noble, 1983.
- Buxton, John. The Grecian Taste: Literature in the Age of Neo-Classicism, 1740–1820. London: Macmillan Press, 1978.
- Canani, Marco. Ellenismi britannici. L'ellenismo nella poesia, nelle arti e nella cultura britannica, dagli augustei al Romanticismo. Roma: Aracne, 2014.
- Casey, Christopher. " 'Grecian Grandeurs and the Rude Wasting of Old Time': Britain, the Elgin Marbles, and Post-Revolutionary Hellenism." "Foundations," 3.1 (2008) 31–64.
- Clarke, G.W., ed. Rediscovering Hellenism: The Hellenic Inheritance and the English Imagination. London: Cambridge University Press, 1989.
- Clarke, M.L. Greek Studies in England, 1730-1830. Cambridge: Cambridge University Press, 1945.
- Comet, Noah. "Letitia Landon and Romantic Hellenism." The Wordsworth Circle, 37.2 (2006) 76–80.
- Comet, Noah. "Felicia Hemans and the 'Exquisite Remains' of Modern Greece." The Keats-Shelley Journal, 59 (2009) 96-113.
- Comet, Noah. Romantic Hellenism and Women Writers. London: Macmillan, 2013.
- Crook, J. Mordaunt. The Greek Revival: Neo-Classical Attitudes in British Architecture, 1760–1870. London: J. Murray, 1972.
- Crompton, Louis. Byron and Greek Love: Homophobia in 19th-Century England. England: The Gay Men's Press, 1985.
- DeLaura, David. Hebrew and Hellene in Victorian England. Austin: University of Texas Press, 1969.
- Dowling, Linda. Hellenism and Homosexuality in Victorian England. Ithaca: Cornell University Press, 1994.
- Eitner, Lorenz, ed. Neoclassicism and Romanticism, 1750–1850: Sources and Documents. Englewood Cliffs, N.J.: Prentice-Hall, 1970.
- Ferris, David. Silent Urns: Romanticism, Hellenism, Modernity. Stanford: Stanford University Press, 2000.
- Goldhill, Simon. Who Needs Greek? Contests in the Cultural History of Hellenism. London: Cambridge University Press, 2002.
- Harding, Anthony. The Reception of Myth in English Romanticism. Columbia, Mo.: University of Missouri Press, 1995.
- Helmick, E.T. "Hellenism in Byron and Keats." Keats-Shelley Memorial Bulletin 22 (1971): 18–27.
- Highet, Gilbert. The Classical Tradition: Greek and Roman Influences on Western Literature. London: Oxford University Press, 1976.
- Hurst, Isobel. Victorian Women Writers and the Classics: The Feminine of Homer. London: Oxford University Press, 2006
- Jenkyns, Richard. The Victorians and Ancient Greece. Oxford: Basil Blackwell, 1980.
- Levin, Harry. The Broken Column: A Study in Romantic Hellenism. Cambridge: Harvard University Press, 1931.
- Marchand, Suzanne. Down from Olympus: Archaeology and Philhellenism in Germany, 1750–1970 Princeton: Princeton University Press, 1996.
- Miller, Edward. That Noble Cabinet: A History of the British Museum. London: Andre Deutsch Ltd., 1973.
- Prins, Yopie. Victorian Sappho. Princeton: Princeton University Press, 1999.
- Protopsaltis, E.G. "Byron and Greece," in Byron's Political and Cultural Influence in Nineteenth-century Europe, ed. Paul Graham Trueblood. London: Macmillan, 1981.
- Roessel, David. In Byron's Shadow: Modern Greece in English and American Literature from 1770 to 1967. New York: Oxford University Press, 2001.
- St. Clair, William. Lord Elgin and the Marbles. 3rd ed. Oxford: Oxford University Press, 1998.
- St. Clair, William. That Greece Might Still Be Free: The Philhellenes in the War of Independence. London: Oxford University Press, 1972.
- Spender, Harold. Byron and Greece. London: John Murray, 1924.
- Stern, Bernard Herbert. The Rise of Romantic Hellenism in English Literature, 1732-1786. New York: Octagon Books, 1969.
- Turner, Frank. The Greek Heritage in Victorian Britain. New Haven: Yale University Press, 1981.
- Vrettos, Theodore. A Shadow of Magnitude: The Acquisition of the Elgin Marbles. Toronto: Longman, 1974.
- Webb, Timothy. English Romantic Hellenism, 1700-1824. Manchester: Manchester University Press, 1982.
- Winterer, Caroline. The Culture of Classicism: Ancient Greece and Rome in American Intellectual Life, 1780–1910. Baltimore: Johns Hopkins University Press, 2002.
- Woodhouse, C.M. Modern Greece: A Short History. London: Faber & Faber, 1968.
