= Comet Mountain =

Mountain peak in Montana, United States

Coordinates: 45°27′35″N 113°02′38″W

Comet Mountain, 3113 m (10213 feet), is a mountain peak in the Pioneer Mountains of the state of Montana, United States, located in Beaverhead County 42 km northwest of Dillon.

== See also ==
- Comet (disambiguation)
