= The Comet (train) =

Defunct UK passenger train

Overview
- Service type: Passenger train
- First service: 12 September 1932
- Last service: 1962
- Former operators: LMS, BR

Route
- Termini: London Euston; Manchester London Road
- Service frequency: Daily
- Line used: West Coast Main Line

The Comet was a named passenger train operating in the United Kingdom.

== History ==
The train first ran on Monday 12 September 1932. The Down train from Euston at 11.50am, calling at Crewe with an arrival at Manchester London Road at 3.20pm comprised a six-coach set of carriages, plus a seven-coach set which was split off at Crewe for Liverpool.

The Up train had a departure from Manchester London Road at initially 5.40pm, but later 5.45pm with only one stop at Stafford, arrived in London Euston at 9.p.m, comprising eleven carriages. The Up train was so popular that a relief ran 5 minutes in front of it on Fridays. The train was usually hauled by a Royal Scot locomotive.

It was suspended for the duration of the Second World War but re-appeared in 1949. The Up train had an additional call at Crewe and took nearly 30 minutes longer than its pre-war schedule. In 1954 the schedule was re-timed, and a journey time of 3.5 hours was achieved.

The service disappeared with electrification of the West Coast Main Line in 1962.
