= Comet, Montana =

- Ghost town
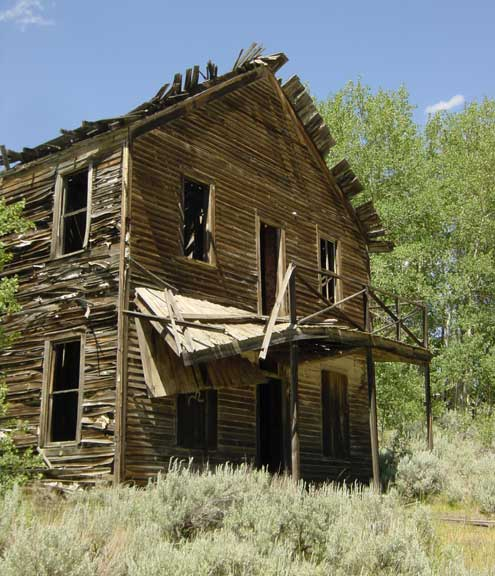
- Comet, Montana

- Location within Montana Location within the United States
- Coordinates: 46°18′39″N 112°10′12″W
- Country: United States
- State: Montana
- County: Jefferson
- Established: 1883
- Abandoned: 1941
- Named for: Comet Mine
- Elevation: 6,388 ft (1,947 m)

Comet is a ghost town located approximately twenty miles (32 kilometers) south-southwest of Helena, Montana, United States. It is reached by following High Ore Road north from Interstate 15. The remains of the town cover about thirty-five acres and consist of an ore hopper, a large ore processing building, several other company buildings, and numerous houses and other private structures. High Ore Creek runs through the center of the property and separates the mine buildings from the town proper. The town is abandoned except for a single active residence; although it sits on private grazing land, it is open to public access.

== History ==
The town is named for the Comet Mine, which was developed in 1883 by the Helena and Livingston Smelting and Reduction Company, based on a discovery made in 1874. Ore was transported to another mine in Wickes for processing. This operation shut down in 1897. Operations were revived in 1900 under the Montana Consolidated Copper Company; in 1927, the Basin Montana Tunnel Company took over the property and built a processing plant on the site for both this mine and the nearby Gray Eagle mine. The company was the largest producer of base metals in the state, outside of Butte, due to production at this mine. They employed 100 men. The operations of BMTC continued until 1941, when the mine was exhausted and operations were permanently halted.

The Comet mine was richest mine in the district, producing $20 million in ore; ten times more than the Gray Eagle mine, which produced over $2 million. Ores produced included lead, zinc, copper, silver, and gold.

== Remediation ==
In 1997 a mine reclamation project was begun to alleviate pollution caused by toxic metal leakage from the tailings. This project was completed in June of the following year and consisted of moving the tailings into a single pile south of the processing building, which was then fenced off and planted. The project, which was overseen by the Mine Waste Cleanup Bureau of the Montana Department of Environmental Quality, was judged to be successful. In 2006 the department received a National Award from the U.S. Office of Surface Mining in recognition of the work done for this project.
