= Noah Comet =

Noah Comet is a professor of English literature at the United States Naval Academy. He specializes in nineteenth-century (Romantic and Victorian) British literature. He is known for his book called Romantic Hellenism and Women Writers from Macmillan and several scholarly articles, among them essays in The Wordsworth Circle and the Keats-Shelley Journal on poets Letitia Landon and Felicia Hemans, and articles on John Keats and Lord Byron, including a 2016 essay on Byron's influence on early explorations of Yellowstone. He has also written essays on nature and ecotourism for The New York Times, The Denver Post, and The Baltimore Sun.

== Education ==
Comet received a Bachelor of Arts degree in English and creative writing from Miami University in Oxford, Ohio, in 2000. Three years later, he received a Master of Arts degree in English from New York University, and he attained a Doctorate of Philosophy in English from the University of California, Los Angeles, in 2008.

== Scholarship ==
His most important works of criticism include his articles on Byron, as well as those on Landon and Hemans, which both form part of his book on British women writers and Hellenism. In 2011 he guest-edited a special issue of the journal Women's Studies and in 2014 a special issue of Studies in Romanticism. He is also the editor of Romantic Circles' Electronic Concordance to Keats' Poetry and the author of several book reviews and other articles and short entries in the fields of Romanticism and Victorianism. He is a vocal supporter of the role of the humanities and liberal arts in society and in leadership, and has published essays on the value of humanities disciplines in the military in particular, including an interview on the subject conducted with then-Chairman of the Joint Chiefs of Staff Martin Dempsey. He has given numerous conference papers at national and international academic conferences.

== Awards ==
Comet's research has been supported by several fellowships from institutions such as the Keats-Shelley Association of America and the University of California, and he is a teacher.

== Publications ==
- Romantic Hellenism and Women Writers. Palgrave Studies in the Enlightenment, Romanticism and Cultures of Print. Palgrave Macmillan, 2013. ISBN 978-1137304971.
