= Comets (film) =

Georgian drama film

- Directed by: Tamar Shavgulidze
- Written by: Tamar Shavgulidze
- Produced by: Tekla Matchavariani; Aleksandre Shervashidze
- Starring: Nino Kasradze; Ketevan Gageshidze; Mariam Iremashvili; Nina Mazodier; Ekaterine Kalatozishvili
- Cinematography: Giorgi Shvelidze
- Edited by: Nodar Nozadze
- Production companies: Georgian National Film Centre; Nushi Film
- Distributed by: MUBI (United Kingdom)
- Release date: September 7, 2019 (TIFF)
- Running time: 70 minutes
- Country: Georgia
- Language: Georgian
- Budget: €45,000

Comets (Georgian: კომეტები, K'omet'ebi) is a 2019 Georgian drama film written and directed by Tamar Shavgulidze in her screen debut. The film follows two women who are reunited after thirty years following a brief romantic relationship as teenagers, during which time one has moved abroad and become a restaurateur, while the other has remained in Georgia, married and had children. The film premiered at the 2019 Toronto International Film Festival.

== Synopsis ==
Nana is preparing for the arrival of her son Giorgi and his family when her childhood friend Irina, with whom she had a secret love affair as a teenager, stops by her home in the countryside outside Tbilisi on her way to the airport to return to her home in Kraków. The women talk about the three decades that have passed: Irina moved to Europe, witnessing the fall of the Berlin Wall and living in Germany and Portugal before taking over her father's restaurant business in Poland upon his death; while Nana remained in their hometown through several wars, married and had two children - including a daughter secretly named after Irina - before being widowed seven years earlier. During their conversations, flashbacks are shown of their adolescence in Nana's garden. In the present, the two share a kiss before being interrupted by Nana's daughter returning home. The film ends with the recreation of a sci-fi film that the younger versions of Nana and Irina watched in Nana's garden.

== Cast ==
- Nino Kasradze as Irina, a Georgian woman who has long emigrated to Kraków, where she runs a restaurant business.
  - Mariam Iremashvili as young Irina
- Ketevan Gegeshidze as Nana, Irina's widowed childhood friend, who has remained in their village in Georgia and has had children and grandchildren.
  - Nina Mazodier as young Nana
- Ekaterine Kalatozishvili as Irina, Nana's daughter, named after her former lover.

== Production ==
The film's title comes from the poem "The Night Dances" written by Sylvia Plath. It was filmed on location in Georgia in 2018, with post-production being completed the following year.

== Release ==
Comets premiered at the Toronto International Film Festival in September 2019; it was subsequently screened at the Queer Lisboa International Queer Film Festival and the Prague International Film Festival, both in 2020.

Comets was also shown at the Tbilisi International Film Festival in December 2019; its premiere received some press attention after the anti-gay group For a United and Moral Georgia picketed the film, in addition to the also-LGBT themed And Then We Danced. The organisation's spokesman criticised Comets as "homosexual propaganda".

== Reception ==
Comets received broadly positive reviews from critics internationally. Alex Heaney from Seventh Row gave the film a rave review, naming it one of the best films at the 2019 Toronto International Film Festival still seeking distribution, describing it as "quiet" and "lovely". Peter Bradshaw in The Guardian awarded the film three stars, describing it as a "strangely affecting drama" and an "interesting experiment in the alternative reality that is love". Madeline Wall, writing in Cinema Scope, praised Shavgulidze's direction and the film's use of flashbacks, though ultimately found it "doesn't quite live up to its ambitions". Nafees Ahmed, writing for High On Films, awarded the film four stars, praising the work of the crew, including Nodar Nozadze's editing and Giorgi Shvelidze's cinematography.

In a negative review, Wendy Ide in Screen Daily criticised the film as being "slow-moving", calling Shavgulidze's writing and directing as "understated" and "low-key", putting a burden on the cast that they "[struggled] to meet".

== Awards ==
Shavgulidze was nominated for Best Screenplay at the 2019 Asia Pacific Screen Awards.
