= B&F Fk12 =

German sport biplane

Fk12
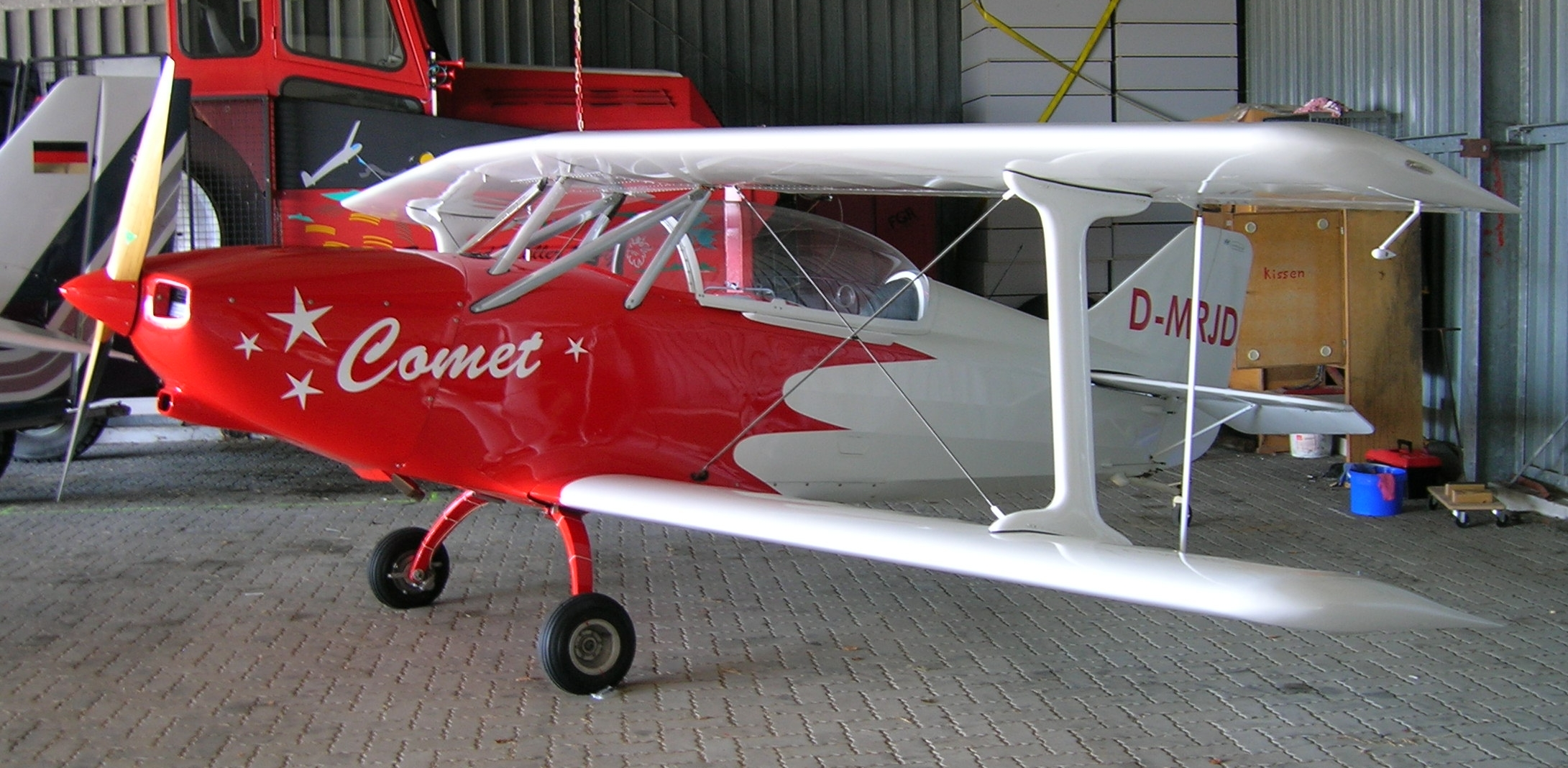

General information
- Type: Tandem seat homebuilt ultralight biplane
- National origin: Germany
- Manufacturer: B&F Technik Vertriebs GmbH, Speyer
- Designer: Peter Funk
- Status: In production (2024)
- Number built: 80+ by April 2009

History
- Manufactured: 1997-2007; 2010-c.2012
- First flight: March 1997

The B&F Fk12 Comet, also called the FK-Lightplanes FK12 Comet, is a single-engine, two-seat sports biplane designed in Germany. First flown in 1999, it was available as a kit or complete and ready-to-fly.

== Design and development ==
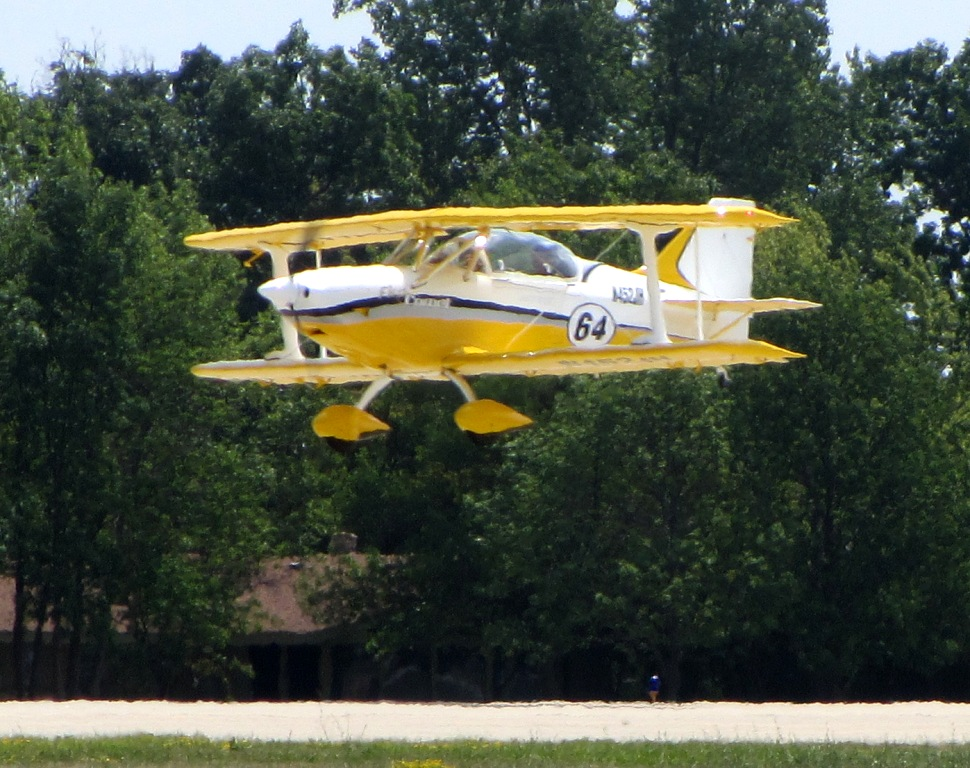
FK12 Comet landing

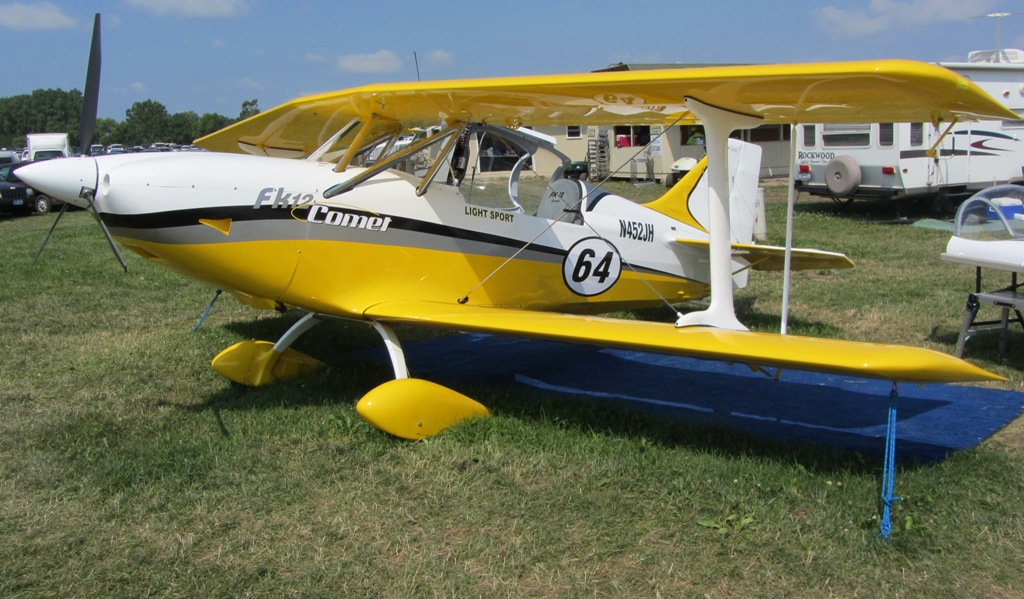
FK-Lightplanes FK12 Comet

Design work on the B&F Fk12 Comet, often called the Funk Fk12 Comet though not by its makers, began in 1994. It is a single-engine biplane with single bay wings of equal span, significant stagger and swept at about 14°, seating two in tandem.

The wing main spar and leading edge are constructed of carbon fibre; there is an aluminium second spar and fabric covered rear section. Streamlined I-shaped interplane struts, one on each side, form the bays, each of which is braced by a pair of lift and drag wires. A pair of inverted V-cabane struts plus secondary strut support the upper wing centre section, with the lower wing attached to the lower fuselage longerons. The trailing edges of both upper and lower wings carry full-span flaperons, connected by external vertical rods. Since 2009, Comets have had a chord extension of 40 mm (1.6 in) and flaperons mounted on external U-shaped hinges to improve roll rate and control. The wings fold for compact hangarage. Vertical and horizontal tail surfaces are trapezoidal, with a swept fin. The rudder is deep and tabbed, moving in a cutout between the elevators. The tailplane, mounted on the upper fuselage longerons, is braced with struts from below, aided by wires both above and below.

The Comet has a metal tube fuselage structure, using steel at the front and aluminium further aft. It is covered with a mixture of composites and glass-fibre laminates. There are two seats in tandem, the forward one under the wings and the rear seat well behind the trailing edge. Both cockpits may be open; the front one enclosed; or both enclosed by a single, side-hinged canopy. Conversion from one configuration to another takes a few minutes The Comet has a conventional undercarriage, with spring cantilever legs mounted on the lower fuselage longerons carrying mainwheels which may be faired. A ballistic parachute (BRS 5) is an option.

The Comet is powered by one of several Rotax horizontally opposed four-cylinder engines: the 60 kW (80 hp) 912 UL, the 74 kW (99 hp) 912 ULS or the turbocharged, 87 kW (113 hp) 914, all driving two-blade propellers. A Lycoming AEIO-233 engine is being tested as an optional engine.

The Fk12 Comet first flew in March 1997, production beginning in May. Certification was gained in 1999. It has been marketed in three forms: complete flyaway aircraft, kit, and fast-build kit. Kit production was interrupted between 2007 and 2009; complete aircraft production was restarted in 2010. By 2017 it was no longer advertised for sale.

The design is an accepted Federal Aviation Administration special light-sport aircraft.

== Operational history ==
Over 80 aircraft had been built by April 2009. In mid-2010 the European registers (excluding Russia) listed 92.

== Variants ==
In 2011 B&F marketed an improved "Special Limited Edition" of the Comet with modified wings, tail surfaces, undercarriage and other features.

== Specifications (Rotax 912 ULS) ==
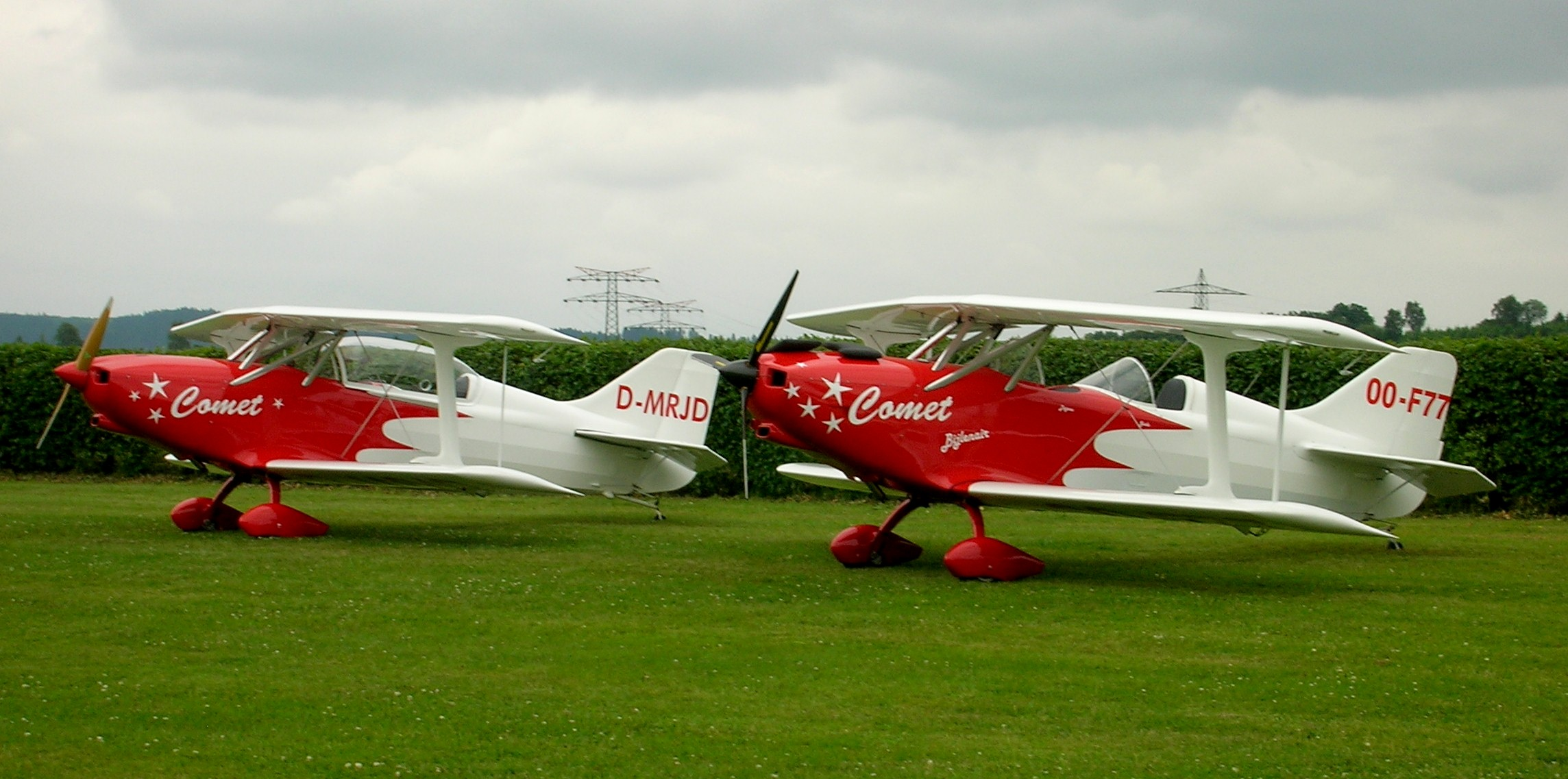
Two Comets, showing two different cockpit enclosure choices

Data from Jane's All the World's Aircraft 2010/11

General characteristics

- Capacity: two
- Length: 5.54 m (18 ft 2 in)
- Wingspan: 6.74 m (22 ft 1 in)
- Height: 1.98 m (6 ft 6 in)
- Wing area: 13.40 m^{2} (144.2 sq ft)
- Empty weight: 265 kg (584 lb)
- Max takeoff weight: 450 kg (992 lb) or 520 kg (1,146 lb) where permitted
- Powerplant: 1 × Rotax 912 ULS flat-four cylinder, water and air cooled, 73.5 kW (98.6 hp)
- Propellers: 2-bladed MT-Propeller or Mühlbauer wooden, or Duc constant speed

Performance

- Maximum speed: 202 km/h (126 mph, 109 kn)
- Cruise speed: 180 km/h (110 mph, 97 kn) at 75% power
- Stall speed: 65 km/h (40 mph, 35 kn) flaps down
- Never exceed speed: 220 km/h (140 mph, 120 kn)
- Range: 650 km (400 mi, 350 nmi) with maximum fuel
- g limits: +9/-3.5 at 450 kg (992 lb) weight
- Rate of climb: 7.0 m/s (1,380 ft/min)
