= List of shipwrecks in 1875 =

The list of shipwrecks in 1875 includes ships sunk, foundered, grounded, or otherwise lost during 1875.

table of contents
1875
Jan	Feb	Mar	Apr
May	Jun	Jul	Aug
Sep	Oct	Nov	Dec
Unknown date

== Unknown date ==
List of shipwrecks: Unknown date 1875
Ship	State	Description
A. C. Bird	United States	The steamboat sank in the Missouri River at Liberty Landing, below the mouth of the Kansas River, apparently in 1875.
Alfred	Germany	The brig was wrecked on Bonham Atoll, in the Marshall Islands. Her crew were rescued.
Amberes	Spain	The steamship sank at Santander.
Aurora	United Kingdom	The ship was destroyed by fire at sea. All on board were rescued by Melmerly (United Kingdom). Aurora was on a voyage from Adelaide, South Australia to a British port.
Blonde	New Zealand	The 14-ton cutter left Tauranga with a cargo of coal for Auckland with two crew in mid-September. Her hulk was discovered floating close to Kennedy Bay on 16 October.
Clevedon	United Kingdom	The ship was destroyed by fire after 15 June. Her crew were rescued. She was on a voyage from Liverpool, Lancashire to Valparaíso, Chile.
Comet	United States	The 350-ton bark left Port Chalmers, New Zealand, on 27 February bound for Hobart, Tasmania with a 13-man crew, and was not seen again.
Cora	Flag unknown	The schooner was lost in the vicinity of "Squan Beach," a term used at the time for the coast of New Jersey near Manasquan and sometimes for the 7-mile (11 km) stretch of coast between Manasquan Inlet and Cranberry Inlet or for the entire coast of New Jersey between Sea Girt and Barnegat Inlet.
Dunbrody	United Kingdom	The barque foundered off the coast of Labrador, Newfoundland Colony.
Eleanor	New Zealand	The cutter struck rocks while trying to enter the Pleasant River near Palmerston, New Zealand, sometime in the middle of 1875, and was wrecked. All hands survived.
Endeavour	United States	The clipper was destroyed by fire in Japan.
Enjema	Germany	The ship was abandoned at sea after 17 June. Her crew were rescued. She was on a voyage from London to Guayaquil, Ecuador.
Faveur	Denmark	The barque foundered in the North Sea with the loss of all hands after 6 October.
Le Baron	United Kingdom	The barque caught fire at sea and was abandoned. She was on a voyage from Hull, Yorkshire to Valparaíso, Chile.
M. J. Forsha	Flag unknown	The sloop was lost in the vicinity of "Squan Beach," a term used at the time for the coast of New Jersey near Manasquan and sometimes for the 7-mile (11 km) stretch of coast between Manasquan Inlet and Cranberry Inlet or for the entire coast of New Jersey between Sea Girt and Barnegat Inlet.
New Wabeno	Flag unknown	The ship was abandoned at sea after 22 July. Her crew were rescued by the steamship Sorata (Flag unknown).
Patmos	United Kingdom	The barque caught fire at sea and was abandoned. She was on a voyage from Hull to Valparaíso.
Prince Alfred	United Kingdom	The barque foundered in the Pacific Ocean before 4 May. At least some of her crew survived. She was on a voyage from Mejillones, Chile to London.
Rathfern	United Kingdom	The ship was presumed to have foundered with the loss of all 36 crew.
Stella	Germany	The barque was driven ashore at Victoria, British Columbia, Canada.
Strathmore	United Kingdom	The ship was destroyed by fire in the South Atlantic between 19 April and 30 August with the loss of all 40 crew and 150–200 passengers. She was on a voyage from London to Otago, New Zealand.
The Queen	Flag unknown	The steamer was lost in the vicinity of "Squan Beach," a term used at the time for the coast of New Jersey near Manasquan and sometimes for the 7-mile (11 km) stretch of coast between Manasquan Inlet and Cranberry Inlet or for the entire coast of New Jersey between Sea Girt and Barnegat Inlet.
Tornado	United Kingdom	The clipper was destroyed by fire at New Orleans, Louisiana, United States.
