= USS Comet =

USS Comet or USNS Comet has been the name of more than one United States Navy ship, and may refer to:

- USS Comet (SP-772), a patrol vessel in commission from February to August 1918
- USS Comet (AP-166), a transport in commission from 1944 to 1946
- USNS Comet (T-AK-269), a cargo ship, later vehicle landing ship (T-LSV-7), later vehicle cargo ship/roll-on/roll-off ship, (T-AKR-7) in non-commissioned service in the Military Sea Transportation Service and Military Sealift Command from 1958 until being placed in reserve in 1985, and still in reserve
