= SS Comet =

SS Comet may refer to one of several commercial passenger steamships:

- PS Comet, a paddle steamer built in 1811 in Port Glasgow that established the first successful commercial passenger service in Europe; wrecked in 1820 near Oban
- PS Comet (1821), a paddle steamer built in 1821 at Dumbarton in succession to the 1811 vessel; sank in a collision in 1825 with the loss of about 70 lives
- PS Comet (1825), a steam packet built in Liverpool in 1825 and later renamed Lucifer; she was a hulk from 1875
- Comet (steamboat), a wooden steamship built in 1857 in Cleveland, Ohio; carried cargo and passengers on the Great Lakes; wrecked 1875 in Lake Superior with a cargo of silver ore
- Comet (sternwheeler), an American steamboat in operation from 1871 to 1900 in the state of Washington

or one of several Type C2 ships built for the United States Maritime Commission:

- SS Comet (1939) (MC hull number 33, Type C2), built by Federal Shipbuilding; transferred to the United States Navy as Castor-class general stores issue ship USS Pollux (AKS-2); wrecked and lost in Newfoundland in 1942
- SS Comet (1941) (MC hull number 125, Type C2-T), built by Tampa Shipbuilding; transferred to the United States Navy as Lassen-class ammunition ship USS Shasta (AE-6); scrapped in 1972
- USS Comet (AP-166) (MC hull number 293, Type C2-S-B1), built in 1943 by Moore Dry Dock as SS Comet; transferred to the United States Navy as a La Salle-class transport; sold for commercial use in 1948; scrapped in 1970
