= Komet (American automobile) =

American automobile manufactured only in 1911

The Komet was an American automobile manufactured in 1911 in Elkhart, Indiana.

== History ==
The Sterling-Hudson Whip Company formed the Elkhart Motor Car Company in 1909. The automobiles were called Sterling except for 1911 when Komet was added. The Sterling and Komet automobiles were 4 cylinder 30/40hp cars on a 115" to 125" wheelbase. Prices ranged from $1,500 to $2,500.

862 automobiles were built by Sterling-Hudson until Elkhart Motor Car Company was sold in 1911.
