= USS Comet (AP-166) =

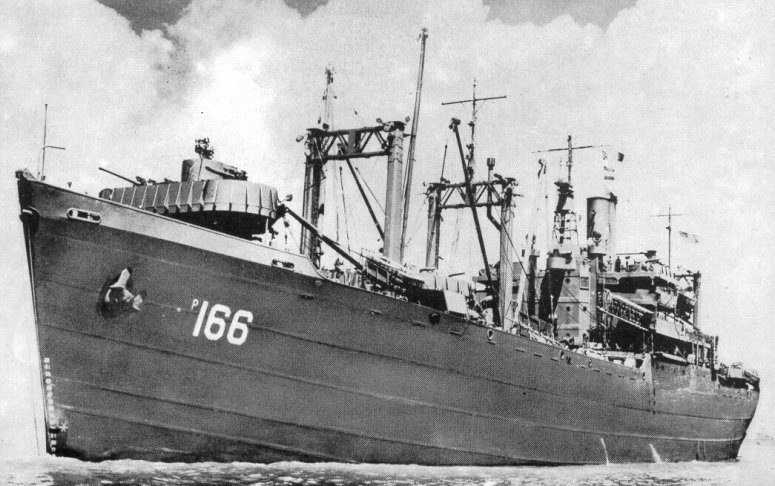
- USS Comet (AP-166) underway sometime between 1944 and 1946.

History

United States
- Name: USS Comet
- Namesake: A comet
- Builder: Moore Dry Dock Company, Oakland, California
- Launched: 21 December 1942
- Sponsored by: Mrs. E. Warren
- Commissioned: 15 February 1944
- Decommissioned: 14 August 1946
- Honors and awards: Three battle stars for World War II service
- Fate: Transferred to War Shipping Administration for disposal 1946; Sold 1948
- Notes: Operated commercially as SS Pioneer Reef 1948-1965 and as SS Australian Reef 1965-1970; Sold for scrapping May 1970

General characteristics
- Class & type: La Salle-class transport
- Displacement: 6,556 tons light; 13,910 tons full load
- Length: 459 ft 2 in (139.95 m)
- Beam: 63 ft (19 m)
- Draft: 23 ft (7.0 m) limiting
- Installed power: Three 250-kilowatt (335-horsepower) 240-volt direct-current diesel ship's service generators; 880 barrels (140 m^{3}) diesel fuel
- Propulsion: One General Electric Steam turbine; two Foster Wheeler D-type boilers 450 psi at 750 degrees; double General Electric main reduction gears; 6,000 horsepower (4.47 megawatts); one shaft; 10,300 barrels (1,640 m^{3}) Navy special fuel oil
- Speed: 16.5 knots (trial)
- Capacity: 2,100 deadweight tons cargo; 10,321 cubic feet (292 cubic meters refrigerated cargo space; 135,935 cubic feet (3,849 cubic meters) non-refrigerated cargo space
- Troops: 1,575 (75 officers, 1,500 enlisted men)
- Complement: 276 (24 officers, 252 enlisted men)
- Armament: 1 × single 5-inch/38-caliber (127-mm) dual-purpose gun mount; 4 × single 3-inch/50-caliber (76.2-mm) dual-purpose gun mounts; 12 × single 20-mm antiaircraft gun mounts
- Notes: Largest boom capacity 10 tons

The third USS Comet (AP-166) was a United States Navy La Salle-class transport in commission from 1944 to 1946. She saw service in the Pacific Theater of Operations during the latter stages of World War II and the immediate postwar period.

== Construction and commissioning ==
Comet was laid down under a Maritime Commission contract as the Maritime Commission type C2-S-B1 hull MC 293 by the Moore Dry Dock Company at Oakland, California, and was launched on 21 December 1942, sponsored by Mrs. E. Warren. She was commissioned as USS Comet (AP-166) on 15 February 1944.

== U.S. Navy service ==
=== World War II ===
Comet cleared San Diego, California, on 26 April 1944 carrying U.S. Marines to Pearl Harbor, Territory of Hawaii. She then conducted training in the Hawaiian Islands until 30 May 1944, when she departed for Eniwetok. On 11 June 1944, combat loaded, she put to sea for Japanese-held Saipan, where she unloaded troops and cargo under heavy fire in the initial assault beginning the Battle of Saipan on 15 June 1944. On 22 June 1944 she departed Saipan for Pearl Harbor to load troops for the invasion of Guam, where she landed her men as reinforcements between 23 and 29 July 1944 during the Battle of Guam.

Returning to Pearl Harbor for training until 15 September 1944, Comet then sailed to Manus Island, from which she put to sea 14 October 1944 bound for the landings on Leyte in the Philippine Islands. She put her troops ashore on Leyte between 20 October 1944, the day of the initial assault, and 22 October 1944, thus clearing Leyte Gulf before the great naval Battle of Leyte Gulf in those waters. She returned to Leyte in November 1944, carrying reinforcements from New Guinea.

After that, Comet trained off Nouméa in New Caledonia and at Guadalcanal for the assault on Lingayen Gulf on Luzon in the Philippines, where she arrived on 11 January 1945 with troops to reinforce those who had made the assault landings two days earlier. From New Guinea, she brought another group of reinforcements in February 1945, then departed Lingayen Gulf to carry hospital patients from Pearl Harbor to San Francisco, California.

After an overhaul, Comet cleared Port Hueneme, California, on 4 June 1945, carrying construction battalion men (Seabees) and equipment to Okinawa, where she arrived on 12 July 1945 after calling at various ports en route.

World War II came to end on 15 August 1945.

=== Postwar ===
Until 1 August 1946, Comet ranged the Pacific Ocean in the postwar redeployment of military men and the return to the United States of homeward-bound veterans. She made seven transpacific voyages, calling at such ports as Okinawa, Guam, Saipan, Hollandia, Manus, Sasebo, Qingdao, and Taku in the western Pacific; Kodiak, Dutch Harbor, Adak, and Attu in the Territory of Alaska; Seattle, Washington; and San Francisco, San Pedro, and San Diego, California.

== Disposal ==
Comet was decommissioned at Seattle on 14 August 1946, and transferred to the War Shipping Administration for disposal. On 1 September 1946, the War Shipping Administration's functions were transferred to the United States Maritime Commission, which sold Comet to American Pioneer Lines in 1948.

== Commercial career ==
American Pioneer Lines renamed the ship SS Pioneer Reef. In 1965, Pioneer Reef was sold and renamed SS Australian Reef.

Australian Reef was sold for scrapping at Kaohsiung, Taiwan, in May 1970.

== Honors and awards ==
USS Comet received three battle stars for her World War II service, for:

• the Marianas operation (the capture and occupation of Saipan, 15 to 22 June 1944, and the capture and occupation of Guam, 23 to 29 July 1944),
• the Leyte operation (the Leyte landings, 20 to 22 October 1944), and
• the Luzon operation (the Lingayen Gulf landings, 11 January 1945).
