= SMS Comet =

Two ships of the German Kaiserliche Marine (Imperial Navy) have been named SMS Comet:

- SMS Comet (1860), a gunboat launched in 1860
- SMS Comet (1892), an aviso launched in 1892

== See also ==
- SMS Komet, an Austro-Hungarian torpedo gunboat
