= Comet (British racing dinghy) =

Type of single handed racing dinghy

Comet Dinghy (UK)
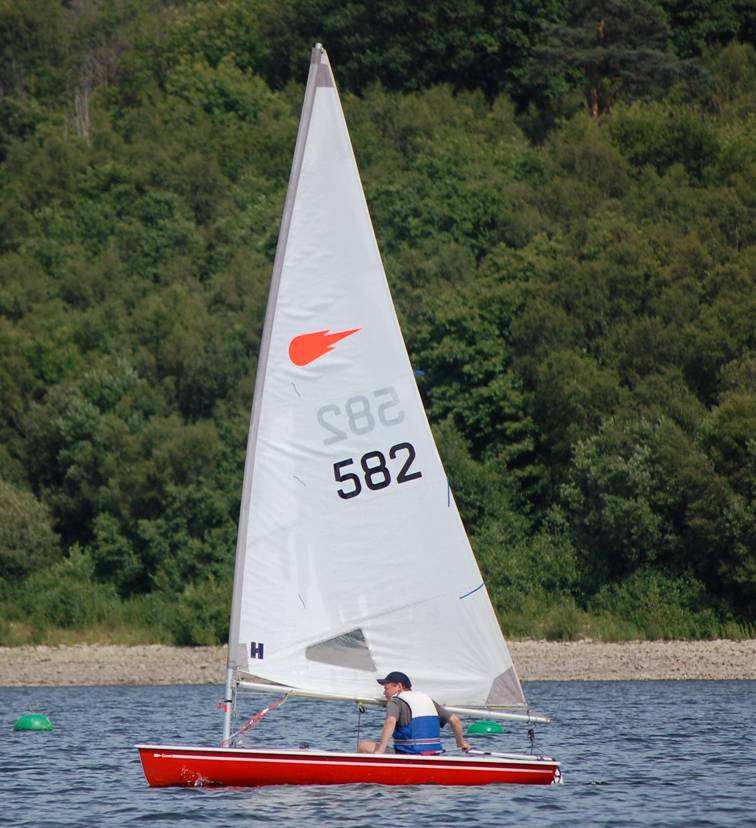

Development
- Designer: Andrew Simmons
- Year: 1981
- Design: Strict One-Design
- Name: Comet Dinghy (UK)

Boat
- Crew: 1

Hull
- Type: Monohull
- Construction: GRP
- Hull weight: 110 lb (50 kg)
- LOA: 11 ft 4 in (3.45 m)
- Beam: 4 ft 6 in (1.37 m)

Hull appendages
- Keel: Daggerboard

Rig
- Mast height: 19 ft 10 in (6.05 m)

Sails
- Mainsail area: 70 sq ft (6.5 m^{2})

Racing
- RYA PN: 1210

The Comet is a single handed, one design racing dinghy available with three separate rigging options: Standard, Xtra and Mino, that can be raced competitively alongside each other. It is mainly sailed in the United Kingdom at club level and at open meetings organised by the Comet Class Association. The Comet is a recognised RYA dinghy class.

== Specifications ==
The Comet has a large uncluttered cockpit, rear mainsheet (with centre mainsheet permitted under class rules) and an un-battened sail with a sleeve luff on an unstayed rig. The hull and deck is manufactured from glass-reinforced plastic and available in a number of colour combinations.

The sail area of 70 square feet (6.5 m^{2}) for the standard Comet rig is slightly less than for the ILCA 7. The mast is in two sections and is loose footed like the Laser rig.

Latest sail number: 880

== Rigging options ==
- Standard: 70 sq ft (6.5 m^{2})
- Xtra (Mylar Sail): 65 sq ft (6.0 m^{2}) and a 570 mm shorter mast.
- Mino: 54 sq ft (5.0 m^{2}) and a 570 mm shorter mast. PYN 1193
