= Comet (pyrotechnics) =

Type of firework

A comet is a type of firework star fired into the sky from the ground which leaves a long trail of sparks in its wake as it flies through the air. A low noise effect that is popular in pyro-musicals because comets can be easily synchronized to music given their instantaneous impact.

A comet may also be a small block attached to the outside of a shell which burns and emits sparks as the shell is rising, leaving a trail in the sky.

Some comets use a matrix composition with small stars embedded in it. The matrix composition burns with little light but ignites the stars, producing the effect.

Some freely-launched comets contain crossette breaks, which explode and break the comet into several pieces to produce a branching effect.

Comets intended for use indoors near an audience, such as at a rock concert, are typically freely-launched projectiles designed to completely consume themselves to reduce the hazard to audience members.

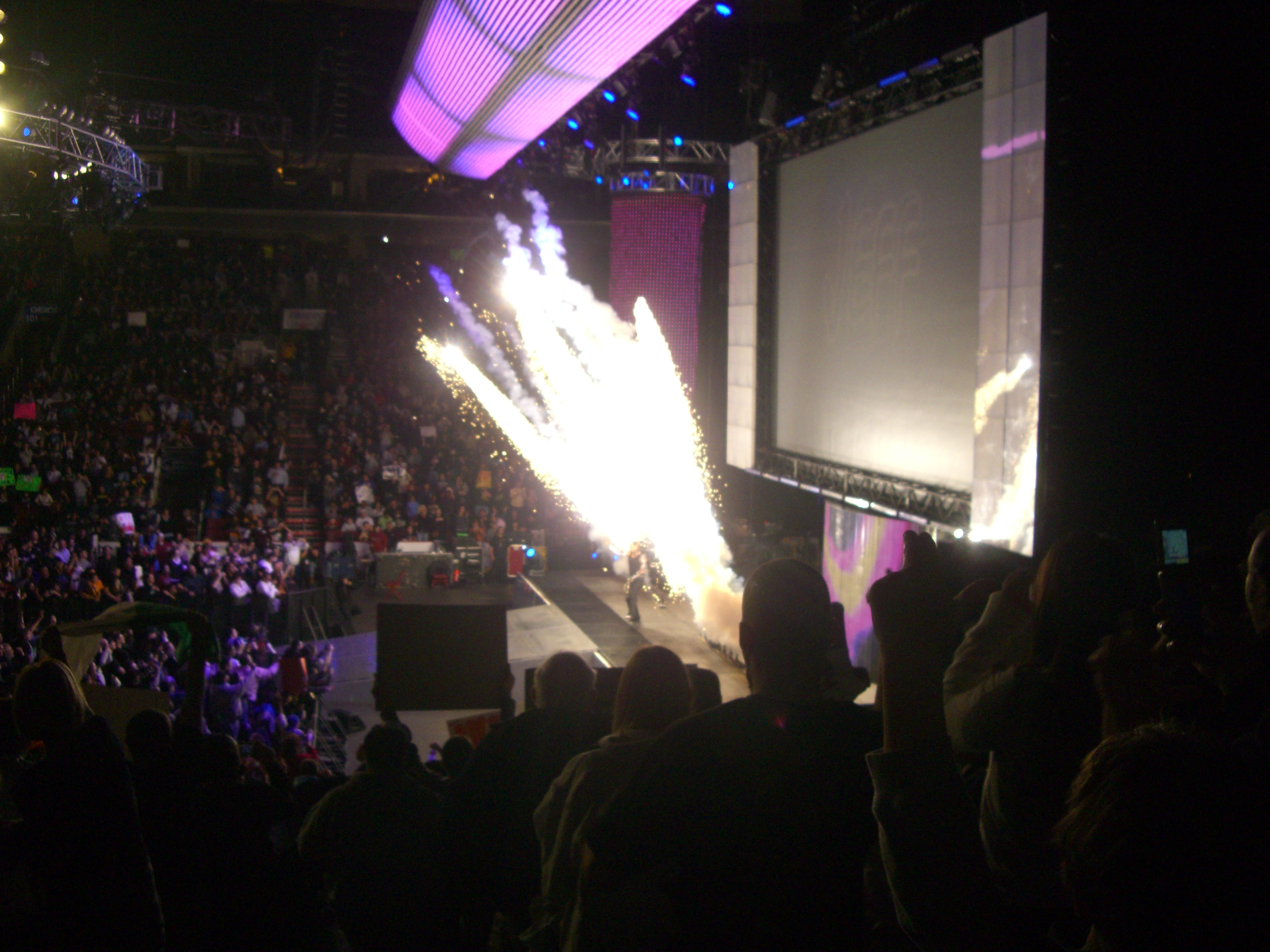
Jeff Hardy using the comet pyrotechnics in his ring entrance
