= Comet (1791 ship) =

British merchantman and whaler 1791–1843

History

Great Britain
- Name: Comet
- Builder: Marmaduke Stalkart, Rotherhithe
- Launched: 29 September 1791
- Fate: Wrecked 1 December 1843

General characteristics
- Tons burthen: 297, or 29746/94, or 300, or 301, or 30250/94, or 303, or 31185/94, or 312 (bm)
- Length: Overall:96 ft 5 in (29.4 m), or 99 ft 2 in (30.2 m); Keel:76 ft 3 in (23.2 m)
- Beam: 27 ft 1 in (8.3 m), or 26 ft 11 3/4 in (8.2 m)
- Depth of hold: 12 ft 0 in (3.7 m),
- Complement: 1793:60; 1797:20
- Armament: 1793: 12 × 2-pounder guns; 1797: 12 × 6-pounder guns; 1811:4 × 9-pounder + 6 × 18-pounder carronades + 2 × 4-pounder guns

Comet was launched in 1791 at Rotherhithe. At the outbreak of war with France, she briefly became a privateer before the British East India Company (EIC) chartered her for one voyage to bring back sugar, saltpeter, and other goods from Bengal. Between 1812 and 1821 she made three voyages as a whaler in the British southern whale fishery. Then between 1823 and 1840 she became a whaler based in Hull, whaling in the northern whale fishery. She returned to trade in 1841 and was lost on 1 December 1843 homeward bound from Quebec.

== Career ==
=== Merchantman ===
Comet first appeared in Lloyd's Register (LR) in 1791 with S.Baker, master, B.Daubuz, owner, and trade London–Leghorn. Captain Sampson Baker acquired a letter of marque on 11 April 1793. The size of her crew suggests that the intent was to cruize as a privateer. Not long after, the EIC chartered Comet and had Young measure her in 1794. Lloyd's Register for 1794 showed her trade changing from London–Straits [of Gibraltar] to London–Bengal.

EIC voyage (1794–1795): Baker sailed from Gravesend on 17 June 1794, bound for Bengal and Madras. Comet arrived at Calcutta on 15 November. Homeward bound she was at Kedgeree on 29 January 1795 and Saugor on 18 February. She was at Madras on 4 March and reached Saint Helena on 24 May. She stopped at the River Shannon on 13 September, and arrived back at Deptford on 18 October.

After her return, Comet became a West Indiaman, with Captain Anthony Hooper acquiring a letter of marque on 6 September 1797. On 6 March 1798 Lloyd's List (LL) reported that the French privateer Garonne had captured Comet, Hooper, master, as Comet was sailing from Martinique to London. Garonne also captured Alert, Bligh, master, which was sailing from St Ubes to Limerick. Garonne put Hooper and Bligh aboard Minerva, Gardner, master, which carried them into Falmouth. On 30 Marc Lloyd's List reported that Comet had been carried into Rochefort. Comet returned to British ownership by means that are currently unclear. A Comet, Peterson, master, arrived at Gravesend on 20 August 1800. She may have returned as a cartel. Then Comet, Murcheson, master, sailed from Gravesend for Demerara on 17 November.

Year	Master	Owner	Trade	Source & Notes
1797	S.Baker; A.Hooper	B.Daubuz; Lauchlan	London–Bengal; London–Saint Vincent	LR
1800	Murchison	Davidson	London–Demerara	LR

LL reported on 18 December 1801 that Comet, Murcheson, master, and Themis, Douglas, master, had run into each other near Portsmouth. Comet was sailing from London to Demerara, and Themis was sailing from London to Grenada. Comet lost her mizzenmast and had her quarters stove in.

Year	Master	Owner	Trade	Source & notes
1807	Murcheson		London–Demerara	LR
1809	Mughan	Smith	London–Demerara	Register of Shipping (RS)
1811	Mughan; Brady	Smith	Hull–Lisbon; London–Lisbon	RS; thorough repair 1811
1811	Maughan; C.Brady	J.Smith	Hull–Lisbon	LR; thorough repair 1811
1812	C.Brady; A.Scura	J.Smith	Hull–Lisbon; South Seas	LR; thorough repair 1811 & repairs 1812

=== Southern Whale Fishery ===
1st whaling voyage (1812–1815): Captain Abel Scurr sailed from Hull on 3 September 1812, bound for Peru and the Galapagos. (Note: The voyage is well-described because the log books have survived.) By one report, Comet had two captains Scurr: was the "fighting captain" and Duke (or Dunn), was the "whaling captain". Comet arrived off the coast of Chile only to undergo detention between January 1813 and March 1814 at Talcahuano. The detention came at the hand of the Patriots, the independence fighter opposing the Spanish loyalists. After her release, Comet went whaling at the Galapagos Islands and elsewhere in the region. (Note: Her detention spared Comet from falling victim to Commodore Porter, who in 1813 had captured 12 British whalers around the Galapagos Islands.) Captain Scurr died on 17 June 1815; Comet arrived at Callao the next day. Comet sailed for home on 15 July, sailing via Cape Horn and Saint Helena.

Comet, Duke, master, returned to England on 4 December 1815 with 350 casks of oil plus fins from 38 whales plus oil from 873 Galapagos turtles, in all 115 tons of oil. Her cargo was worth about £7,000.

Before sailing on her second whaling voyage, Comet, Captain Sugden, sailed to the West Indies. Lloyd's List reported on 11 March 1817 that Comet, Sugden, master, had arrived at Dominica from Hull. She arrived back at Gravesend on 25 May.

Comet, Sugden, master, also sailed to Russia. On 30 August 1817 she was at Petersburg. She returned to Gravesend on 26 October .

Year	Master	Owner	Trade	Source & notes
1816	A.Scura; J.Sugden	J.Smith	Hull–South Seas	LR; large repair 1811, repairs 1812 & 1816
1818	Sugden; E.Phipps	J.Smith	London–South Seas	LR; large repair 1811, repairs 1812 & 1816
1816	A.Storr; Sugden	Smith	Hull–South Seas; Hull–America	Register of Shipping (RS); good repair 1816
1818	Sugden; Phipps	Smith	Liverpool–America; London–South Seas	RS; good repair 1816

2nd whaling voyage (1818–1819): Comet was reported to be at Portsmouth on 26 March 1818, bound for the South Seas. By another account, Comet, Phipps, master, sailed from England on 3 April 1818. He returned on 11 June 1819 with 350 casks plus fins, or 175 tons train oil.

3rd whaling voyage (1819–1821): Captain Stewart (or Steward) sailed from Deal for the South Seas on 3 November 1819, having come from Hull. On 6 December 1819 she was at 2°N 24°W. Comet returned to England on 13 November 1821 with 250 casks (117 tuns) of whale oil, plus fins.

=== Northern Whale Fishery ===
On her return from the South Seas, Comet made a voyage to Russia, and then became a whaler in the Northern Whale Fishery.

Year	Master	Owner	Trade	Source
1822	J.Stewart; A. Haig	J.Smith	Hull–South Seas; Hull–Archangel	LR; large repairs 1819 & repairs 1822
1823	A.Haigh; J.Brass	Marshall	Hull–Archangel; Davis Strait	LR; large repairs 1819 & repairs 1822 & 1823

For 18 years between 1823 and 1840 Comet made one voyage a year to the Northern Whale Fishery. The following data is from Coltish:

Year	Master	Where	Whales	Tuns whale oil
1823	Brass	Davis Strait	23	185
1824	Brass	Davis Strait	10	130
1825	Brass	Davis Strait	7	90
1826	Brass	Davis Strait	6	87
1827	Newham	Davis Strait	5	86
1828	Knight	Davis Strait	9	114
1829	Knight	Davis Strait	4	45
1830	Woodhall	Davis Strait	1	13
1831	Markham	Davis Strait	3	35
1832	Martin	Davis Strait	28	191
1833	Martin	Davis Strait	22	200
1834	Martin	Davis Strait	6	71
1835	Martin	Davis Strait	1	?
1836	Martin	Davis Strait	1	?
1837	Martin	Davis Strait	0	0
1838	Ward	Davis Strait	20	?
1839	Ward	Davis Strait	5	?
1840	Ward	Davis Strait	0	0

=== Merchantman ===
After several disappointing years as a whaler, her owners shifted her employment to mercantile trade.

Year	Master	Owner	Trade	Source
1840	I.Ward	Barkworth	Hull–Davis Strait; Hull	LR; large repair 1840 & damages and small repair 1841
1841	I.Ward; H.Wright	Barkworth	Hull–Sydney	LR; large repair 1840 & damages and small repair 1841
1842	H.Wright	Barkworth	Hull–Sydney; Hull–Quebec	LR; large repair 1840 & damages and small repair 1841

== Fate ==
Comet ran aground on 1 December 1843 on the Haisborough Sands, in the North Sea off the coast of Norfolk; her crew abandoned her. She had been on a voyage from Quebec City to Hull. Comet was refloated the next day and beached at Great Yarmouth, Norfolk.

The data for Comet in Lloyd's Register for 1843 is unchanged from 1842, with the exception of the annotation "LOST".
