= HMS Comet =

The Royal Navy has used the name Comet no fewer than 18 times:

- HMS Comet (1695) was a 4-gun bomb vessel built in 1695 that the French captured in 1706.
- HMS Comet (1742) was a 14-gun bomb vessel in use from 1742 to 1749, when she was sold. She became the armed merchant vessel named Adventure that appears in Lloyd's Register between 1776, and 1784.
- HMS Comet (1756) was an 8-gun galley used in 1756.
- HMS Comet (1758) was a 10-gun brig-sloop built in India in 1758.
- HMS Comet was the name given to the 10-gun sloop HMS Diligence after her recommissioning as a fireship in 1779.
- HM galley Comet (1777) was a schooner that South Carolina Navy purchased in 1775, converted into a brigantine, and named Comet. The RN captured her in 1777 and converted her into a galley that was destroyed in 1779 during the Siege of Savannah.
- HMS Comet was the Guineaman (slave ship) Betsey that the Royal Navy purchased at Antigua in 1777 and armed with 10-14 guns. The navy sold her in Britain in 1778.
- HM Schooner Comet, of 10 guns, formerly "McDonogh's Packet", operated in 1777 and captured three American vessels in May. She may have been a ship's tender to HMS Aeolus.
- HMS Comet was commissioned in 1780 and paid off in 1782. On 23 December 1781 the "bomb-galley" Comet participated in an invasion of Georgia.
- HMS Comet (1783) was a fireship built in 1783 and used in 1800 at Dunkirk Roads.
- HMS Comet (1807) was launched in 1807 as a Thais-class fireship of the Royal Navy. In 1808 the class were re-rated as sloops, and in 1811 they were re-rated as 20-gun sixth rates. Comet participated in one action that resulted in her crew being awarded the Naval General Service Medal, and some other actions and captures. The Navy sold her in 1815. In 1816 she became an East Indiaman, sailing under a license from the British East India Company (EIC). She sailed between the United Kingdom and Ceylon. It was on one of these journeys that she was wrecked on Cole House Point on the River Thames on 9 August 1828.
- HMS Comet (1822) was launched in 1822, making her the first steam-powered vessel of the Royal Navy, although not added to the Navy List until 1831.
- HMS Comet (1828) was an 18-gun Comet-class sloop launched in 1828, renamed Comus in 1832, and broken up 1862.
- HMS Comet was the former HMS Thunderer, renamed in 1869.
- HMS Comet (1870) was an Ant-class flat-iron gunboat launched in 1870 and sold for breaking in 1908.
- HMS Comet (1910) was an Acorn-class destroyer launched in 1910 and sunk by an Austrian submarine in 1918.
- HMS Comet (H00) was a 1930s C-class destroyer launched in 1931, renamed Restigouche in 1938, and broken up in 1946.
- HMS Comet (R26) was a 1940s C-class destroyer in service from 1944 to 1962.
