= Nong Han Kumphawapi Lake =

Lake in Thailand

- Location within Thailand
- Location: Udon Thani Province, Thailand
- Coordinates: 17°10′N 103°02′E
- Primary inflows: Huai Phai Chan Yai
- Primary outflows: Lam Pao
- Basin countries: Thailand
- Max. length: 7 km (4.3 mi)
- Max. width: 3 km (1.9 mi)
- Surface area: 1.7 km^{2} (0.66 sq mi) (including wetland 4.1 km^{2} (1.6 sq mi))
- Average depth: 1.9 m (6 ft 3 in)
- Surface elevation: 170 m (560 ft)

Nong Han Kumphawapi (Thai: หนองหานกุมภวาปี, pronounced [nɔ̌ːŋ hǎːn kumpʰawaːpiː], often just Nong Han) is a lake in northeast Thailand, north of the town of Kumphawapi, Kumphawapi District, Udon Thani Province.

The lake is shallow, mostly not exceeding a depth of one meter. The open water area of 1.7 km^{2} is surrounded by a wetland covering 4.1 km^{2}, including paddy fields.

In 2001 the lake was proposed as a wetland of international importance by the Thai government.

== Folklore ==
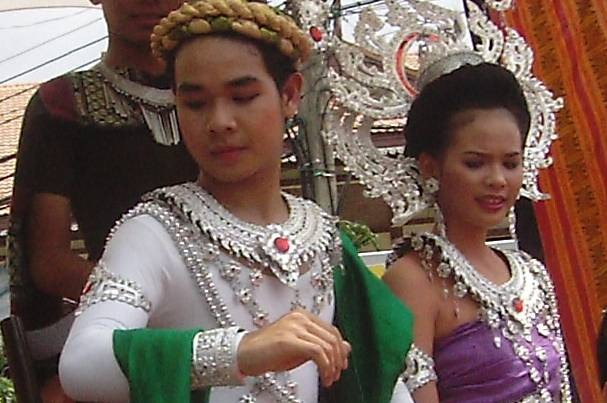
Phadaeng and Nang Ai

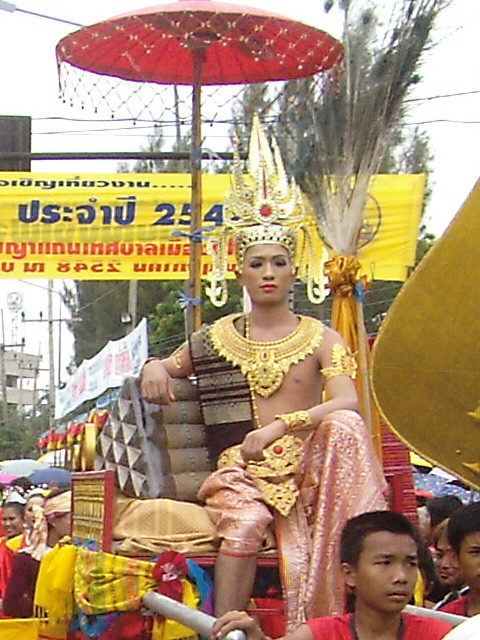
Phangkhi

According to local folklore, from the very beginning Nong Han played a part in the story of Phadaeng and Nang Ai. Nang Ai was the daughter of King Kom who ruled the country of Chathida. The beauty of Nang Ai was famed far and wide. Many desired a royal wedding with her, and not all were men. Among the many who would wed Nang Ai were Prince Phadaeng, a man from another land, and Prince Pangkhii, who had wed Nang Ai in a former life but in this one was the son of Phaya Nak, the Grand Nāga who ruled the deep. So many suitors desired to wed Nang Ai that her father staged a rocket festival competition, the winner to win a royal wedding. But hopes were dashed when only the rockets of her uncles made it aloft, and her father called the whole thing off. Naga Prince Pangkhii shape-shifted into a white squirrel to spy on Nang Ai, but she saw him and had him killed by a royal hunter. Pangkhii's flesh magically transformed into meat equal to 8,000 cartloads (a metric cartload is 2,000 litres). Nang Ai and many of her countrymen ate of this tainted flesh, and Phaya Nak vowed to allow no one to remain living who had eaten of the flesh of his son. Aroused from the deep, he and his watery myrmidons rose and turned the land into a vast swamp of which Nong Han is a remnant.
