= Phadaeng Nang Ai =

Traditional folk tale of Laos and northeast Thailand

Phadaeng Nang Ai (Thai: ผาแดงนางไอ่ and Lao: ຜາແດງນາງໄອ່) is a traditional folk tale of Laos and Northeast Thailand about a tragic love triangle featuring Princess Aikham, the daughter of King Ek-Thita, King Phadaeng of Phaphong city and Queen Sida, prince of the King that resulted in the creation of Nong Han Kumphawapi Lake in Udon.

== Main characters ==
Princess Aikham: Teenage daughter of King Ek-Thita & Queen Sida. She is in love with and marries King Phadaeng

King Ek-Thita & Queen Sida: Rulers of the ancient Khmer Empire and parents of Princess Aikham

King Phadaeng: Ruler of Phaphong city

Prince Phangkhi: Son of King Suttho of Naga. Secretly in love with Princess Aikham

King Suttho: Ruler of Naga

== History ==
Retold over generations with slight variations occurring with each retelling. The story remained largely true to the original. The story mentions King Ek-Thita and his beautiful teenage daughter Aikham, who is the subject of interest and desire of the princes of other cities for her beauty.

== Synopsis ==
Prince Phadaeng of Phaphong hears of Aikham's beauty and in anticipation of winning her hand sends her gifts of gold, diamonds, and silks. On receiving the gifts the chamberlain tells Princess Nang Ai about her admiring prince and how strong and handsome he was. After hearing the story the princess gets interested in the prince and sends a tribute back. Before the chamberlain returns from her journey, Nang Ai sends a message to the prince inviting him and his army to come into her city and meet her. When Phadaeng meets Nang Ai they fall in love and marry.

Pungkee, the son of Sudtonark and prince of the underwater city, desperately wanted to see the beautiful Nang Ai. Pungkee in his past life was poor and mute. He traveled begging for money from village to village until one day he reached a rich man's house. He begged to live in this house in exchange for his labors doing housework. The rich owner liked him so much that he betrothed to him his daughter (Nang Ai in a past life).

Pungkee in his previous existence was not the same as other men. He did not love his wife, but she never rebuked him and always took care of him as a good wife. After a while, Pungkee, missing his home, takes his wife home with him. A millionaire whose wife's father prepares food for the journey, carried by a daughter, but...] (meaning unclear) Pungkee never helps her carry it. It was a difficult journey because they had to cross mountains, forests and canals. Soon the food that she was carrying became weightless because they kept falling along the way. Pungkee seeing mature figs and harvests them for lunch. Nang Ai waited for her husband at the bottom of the fig tree but he sees Pungkee, forgetting his wife and walking away. She decides to collect figs by herself. After she was full she goes back down to the land but she doesn't see her husband. It rankled her and made her suffer all the way until she reached a river. She takes a bath and prays asking for her husband to die at the branch, and for them to never become husband and wife again in their next life.

In their next life, they are reborn as princess Nang Ai and prince Pungkee. When the princess Nang Ai became a teenager she became the most graceful and beautiful girl in the city. The Khmer king sends a message to other cities for the Boon Bung Fai competition to be held at Aekchateeta city. The purpose of this competition was to offer a sacrifice to king Tan in the sky begging for rain. It was also a competition to find out the greatest Boon Bung Fai, who would have Nang Ai ajs his wife.

The king decides that the 15th day of the 6th waxing moon was to be the Boon Bung Fai day. Every other city sent Boon Bung Fai to compete in this festival. It was the biggest Boonbungfai festival ever held. Prince Padang did not get the invitation, but still came to compete and the Khmer king welcomed him. Pungkee, prince of the underwater city also heard about this festival and wanted to visit the human city to see princess Nang Ai but his father was opposed to him going. Prince Pungkee secretly impersonated the albino squirrel in Esan called “Karokdaon” and his followers also impersonated animals and went on a journey to see the beautiful princess. The Boonbungfai festival was fun and everybody wanted to know who would win the festival and win the princess for their wife. Many participated in the drum contest in Esan called “Seng Klong”. The result of this competition was the Boonbungfai of the king Thom. The Boonbungfai of the prince Phadaeng wasn't pleasing to the sky king, but the Boonbungfai of SaengHaen, the king SaengHaen city was the most pleasing to the sky king Tan and he won the competition.

King Saeng Haen was the uncle of princess Nang Ai so the contest was invalidated. Prince Pungkee and Prince Phadaeng went back home after the festival but prince Pungkee couldn’t resist life in the city because he wanted to see princess Nang Ai again. He impersonated the albino squirrel, wearing a gold bell. He held out a branch near Nang Ai’s room and she heard the bell jingle, so she opened the window and saw the albino squirrel. She wanted the albino squirrel so she ordered her hunter to catch it for her, no matter if it was alive or dead. The hunter stalked it by following it through multiple villages, but couldn't catch it. Finally, retribution found Pungkee; he stopped to eat a mature fig as he was hungry and suddenly, the hunter shot him with a toxic dart. Pungkee knew that he would die so he commanded his followers to tell his father and before he died wished for his body to be eaten by everybody in the city. When Pungkee died, the hunter brought his body, which was now squirrel meat, to distribute to every village except Dokkaew village. When Pungkee’s followers came back to tell Naga, who was the father of Pungkee, he got very angry, so he ordered death for everybody that ate his son’s meat. Only Dokkaew survived

Meanwhile, people panicked and fled the city. Prince Phadaeng rode a horse named "Buksam" to find the princess. When he arrived in the city he saw Nagas everywhere. He found out that Nang Ai was cooking squirrel meat, not caring what was happening in her city. Nang Ai gave some squirrel soup to Phadaeng. Phadaeng asks her where the meat was from and Nang Ai answers that it came from the hunter. Phadaeng knew that this was meat from Pungkee, and he stopped eating it.

That night, he heard noises he knew were from Naga, so he brought Nang Ai, a horse to ride and get away. Nang Ai had eaten the squirrel meat, so was to be killed. Phadaeng and Nang Ai tried to get away, but Naga followed them until Nang Ai fell from the horse and drowned. Phadaeng saw her die. He faints and dies because he misses her. After Phadaeng dies, he turns into a ghost and comes to revenge the Naga army. He gathers ghost soldiers to battle them. The large battle destroys every city and village and creates the big swamp that became Monaghan. It only ends when the Seraph stops the war and tells both sides to forgive each other.
