= Rocket Festival =

Traditional festival of Laos and Thailand

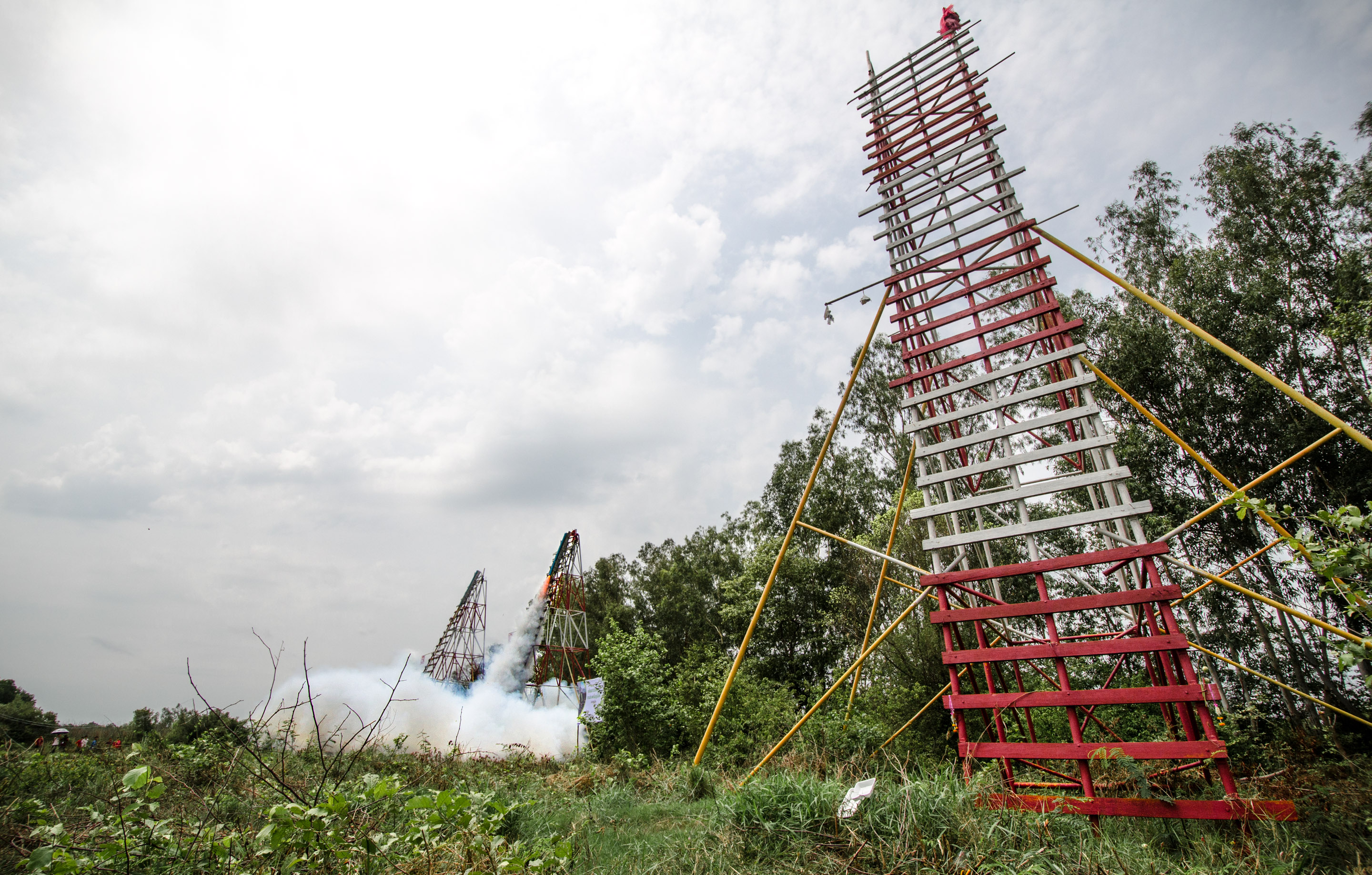
Phaya Thaen Park Saen launch racks, Yasothon, Thailand

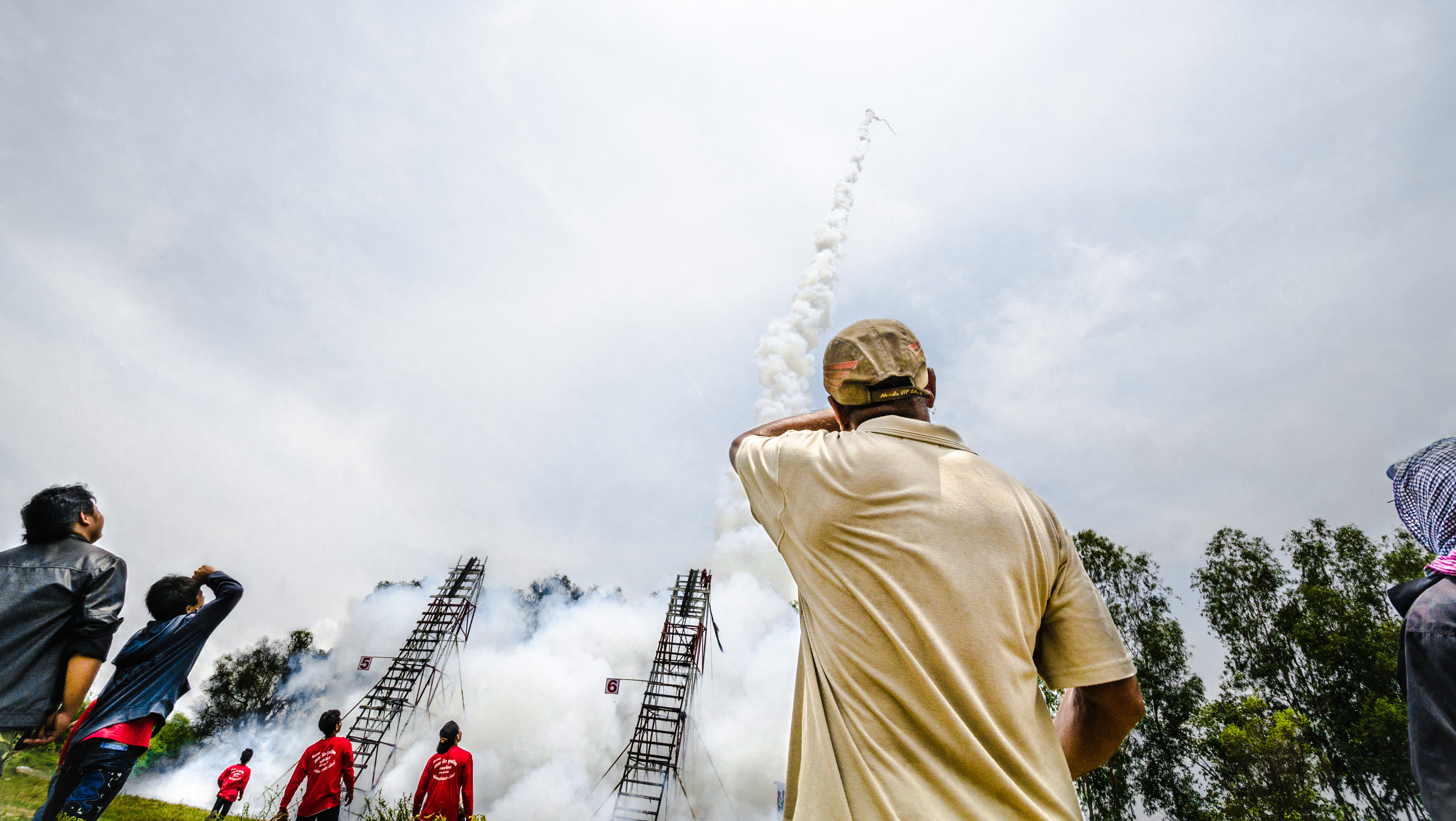
Rockets reaching very high altitudes

The Rocket Festival (Thai: ประเพณีบุญบั้งไฟ, romanized: Prapheni Bun Bang Fai, Lao: ບຸນບັ້ງໄຟ, romanized: Bun Bang Fai) is a merit-making ceremony traditionally practiced by ethnic Lao people at the beginning of the wet season in various villages and municipalities in Northeastern Thailand and Laos. The festivities typically include music and dance performances, competitive processions of floats, dancers, and musicians on the second day, and the competitive firing of homemade rockets on the third day. Local participants and sponsors take advantage of the occasion to enhance their social prestige, as is customary at traditional Buddhist folk festivals throughout Southeast Asia.

Bun Bang Fai is celebrated in all provinces across Laos, but the most popular one used to be held along the bank of the Mekong river in the capital, Vientiane. However, because of considerable urbanization and safety measures, the festivals are now celebrated in nearby villages, including Naxon, Natham, Thongmang, Ban Kern, and Pakkagnoung.

The festival in Thailand also includes special programs and specific local patterns like Bang Fai (parade dance) and a Beautiful Bang Fai float such as Yasothon on the third weekend of May, and continues to Suwannaphum District, Roi Et, on the first weekend of June, and Phanom Phrai District during the full moon of the seventh month in the Lunar year's calendar each year. The Bang Fai festival is not only found in Isan, Northeastern Thailand, North Thailand, and Laos, but also in Amphoe Sukhirin, Narathiwat.

== History ==
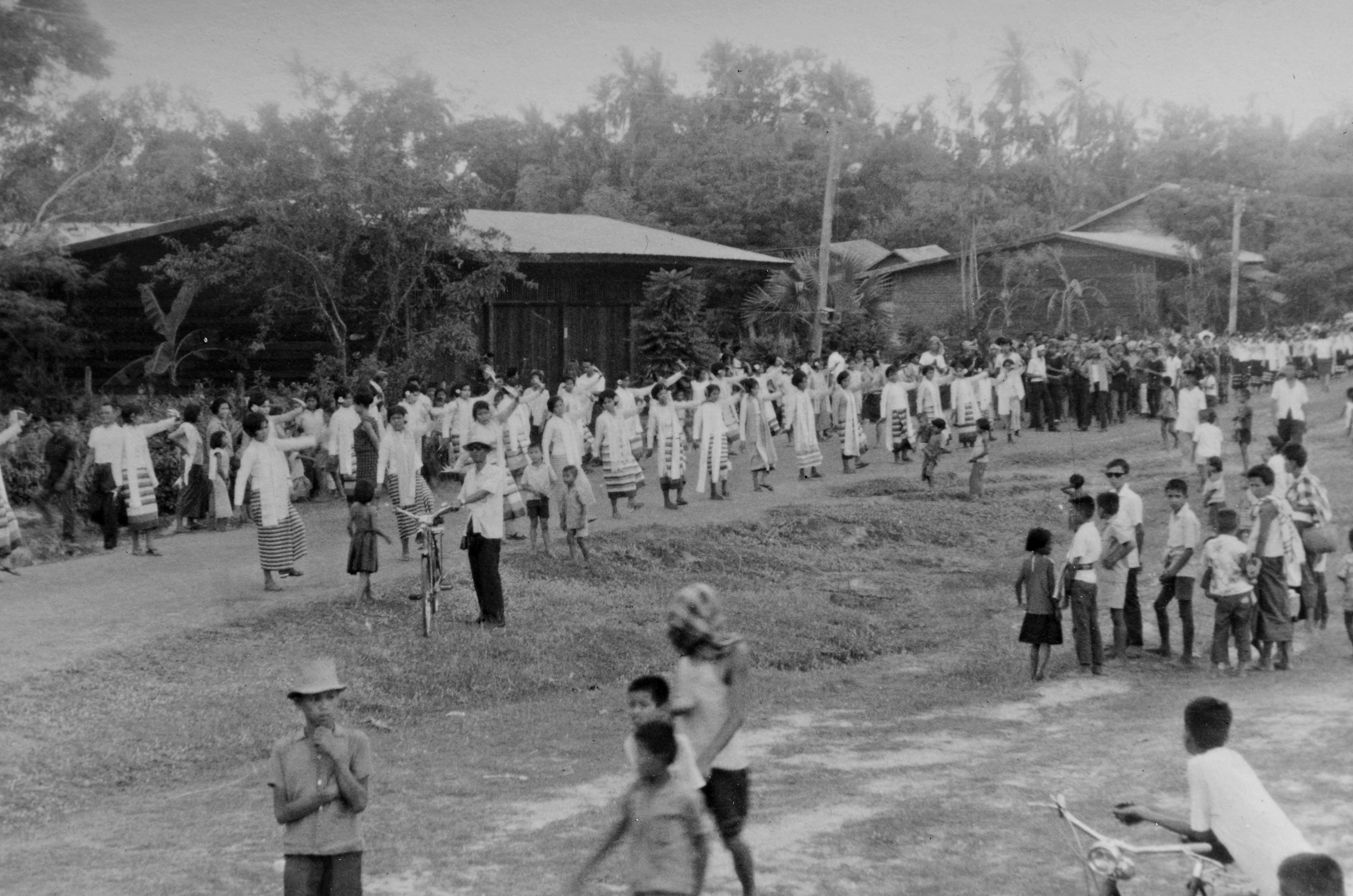
Bangfai Festival in Suwannaphume, Roi Et

These Buddhist festivals are presumed to have evolved from pre-Buddhist fertility rites held to celebrate and encourage the coming of the rains, from before the 9th century invention of black powder. This festival displays some earthy elements of Lao folklore. Bun Bang Fai originates from ancient times when ethnic Lao people believed in many gods and is mentioned in tales, such as 'The Tale of Pha Daeng–Nang Ai' (Lao: ນິທານຂອງຜາແດງ-ນາງໄອ່) and 'The Tale of Phaya Khankhak' (Lao: ນິທານຂອງພະຍາຄັນຄາກ). In the literature of Laos, such stories refer to the firing of rockets to the heavens to communicate with the God of Rain (Lao: ພະຍາແຖນ, romanized: Phaya Thaen) and persuade him to send the rains to the earth in a timely fashion for cultivation.

Early European explorers who passed through Laos in the 1800s recorded witnessing the rocket festivals in the country. Louis de Carné, in 1866, described a celebration in southern Laos where bamboos loaded with powder went off, producing violent explosions. Furthermore, Etienne Aymonier, visiting Laos in 1883, described Bang Phoai (Bang Fai) as strong tubes of bamboo fretted with cords, or rattans, in which powder was stuffed.

The powder was manufactured in the country by mixing ten parts of saltpeter (potassium nitrate) with three pieces of wood charcoal and a part and a half of sulphur. These rockets were then deposited on trestles at the pagoda. The rockets were paraded around the temple before they were launched the next day. The celebration occurred in May or June.

Anthropology Professor Charles F. Keyes advises, "In recognition of the deep-seated meaning of certain traditions for the peoples of the societies of mainland Southeast Asia, the rulers of these societies have incorporated some indigenous symbols into the national cultures that they have worked to construct in the postcolonial period". Giving the "Bun Bang Fai or fire rocket festival of Laos", as one example, he adds that it remains "far more elaborate in the villages than in the cities".

== In Laos ==
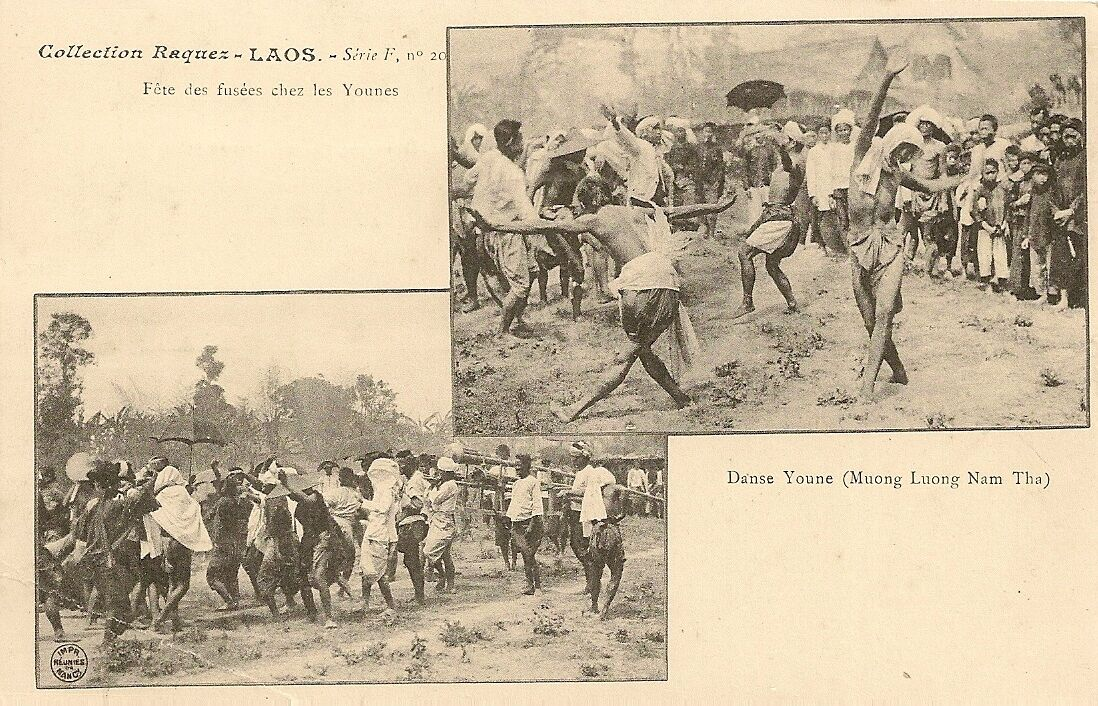
Boun Bang Fai in Luang Nam Tha, Northern Laos

Bun Bang Fai is held over the sixth Lunar month, usually around May and June, coinciding with the plantation and the beginning of the rainy seasons. Several months before the festival, an organizing committee is formed in each future host village to discuss the festival. Weeks before the festival, bamboo rockets are built and decorated by monks and villagers.

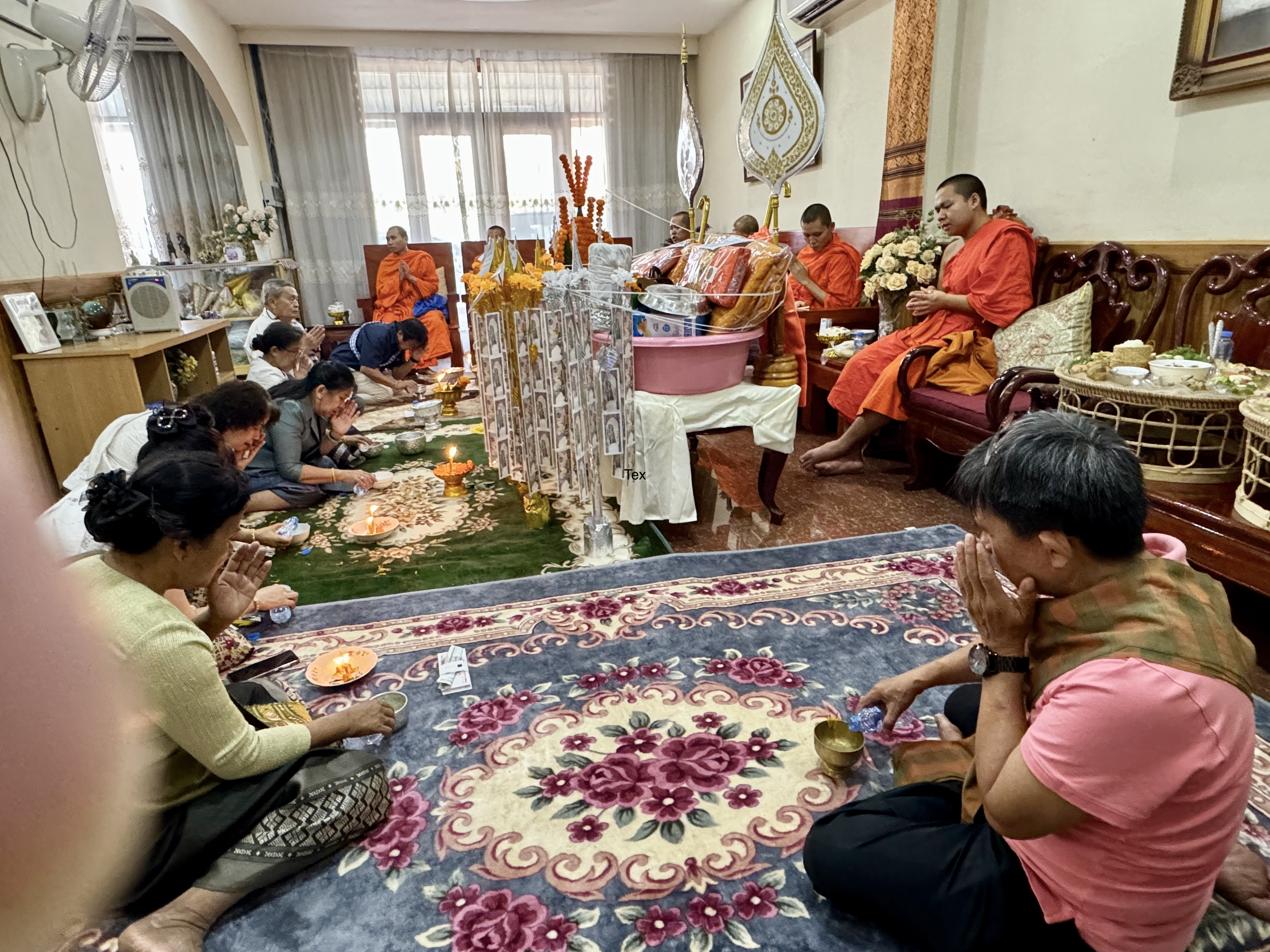
Ceremony offering money trees and foods to monks

The festival usually lasts two days and begins early in the morning with the associated religious rituals performed by the monks in the temple. Early in the afternoon, a Buddhist procession starts in which villagers carrying money trees circle the central ordination hall, in which there is a Buddha statue, three times in a clockwise rotation on the sound of traditional music (Lao: ພິທີແຫ່ຕົ້ນເງິນ, romanized: Phi Thee Hae Ton Ngoen). The money trees are then offered to the monks in a Buddhist ritual believed to garner religious merit. Afterwards, rockets from all involved villages are displayed in the court of the temple, followed by a celebration with traditional music and dance that can last up to the early morning of the next day.

The second day begins with a morning ceremony of food offerings from villagers to the monks in the assembly hall of the temple (Lao: ພິທີຕັກບາດ, romanized: Phi Thee Tak Baat). The food usually includes sticky rice, cakes, and other sweets that the faithful line up to place in the monks’ almsbowls during the sermon. In addition, other food dishes are portioned out in small bowls and offered to the monks on rattan trays. The religious leader of the village ritually presents the food to the monks by reciting the five precepts of Buddhism. The monks, in return, offer the teachings of the Buddha by chanting sutras and sermons. During the sermon, the faithful address prayers to their ancestors and do the Yaat Nam, which consists of having water blessed by a monk before pouring it, drop by drop, on the earth. After the ceremony, a meal is shared by all participants. The faithful believe these offerings grant a long life to anyone who gives with a serene heart.

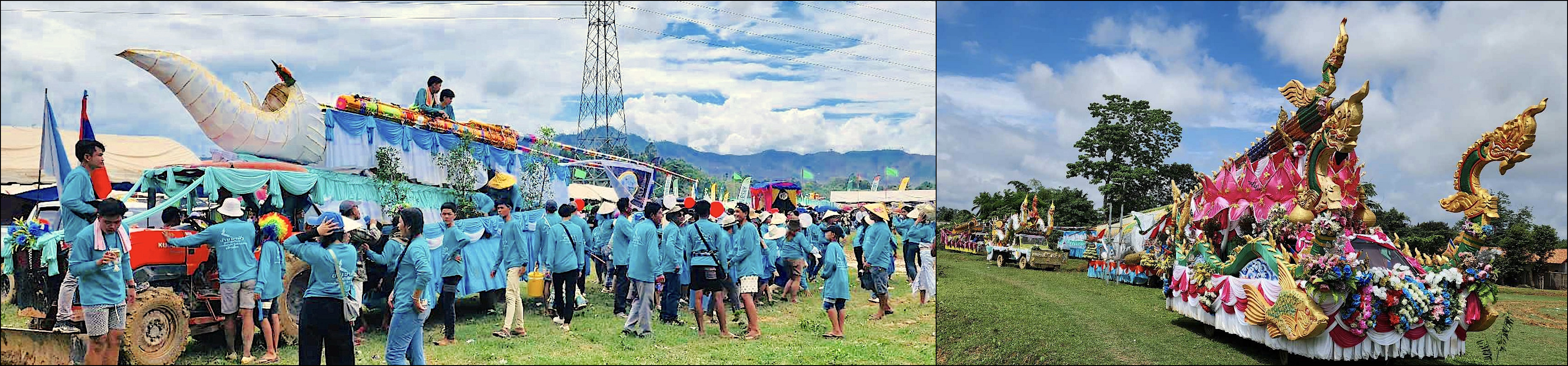
Display of rockets in Feuang district, Laos, 2024

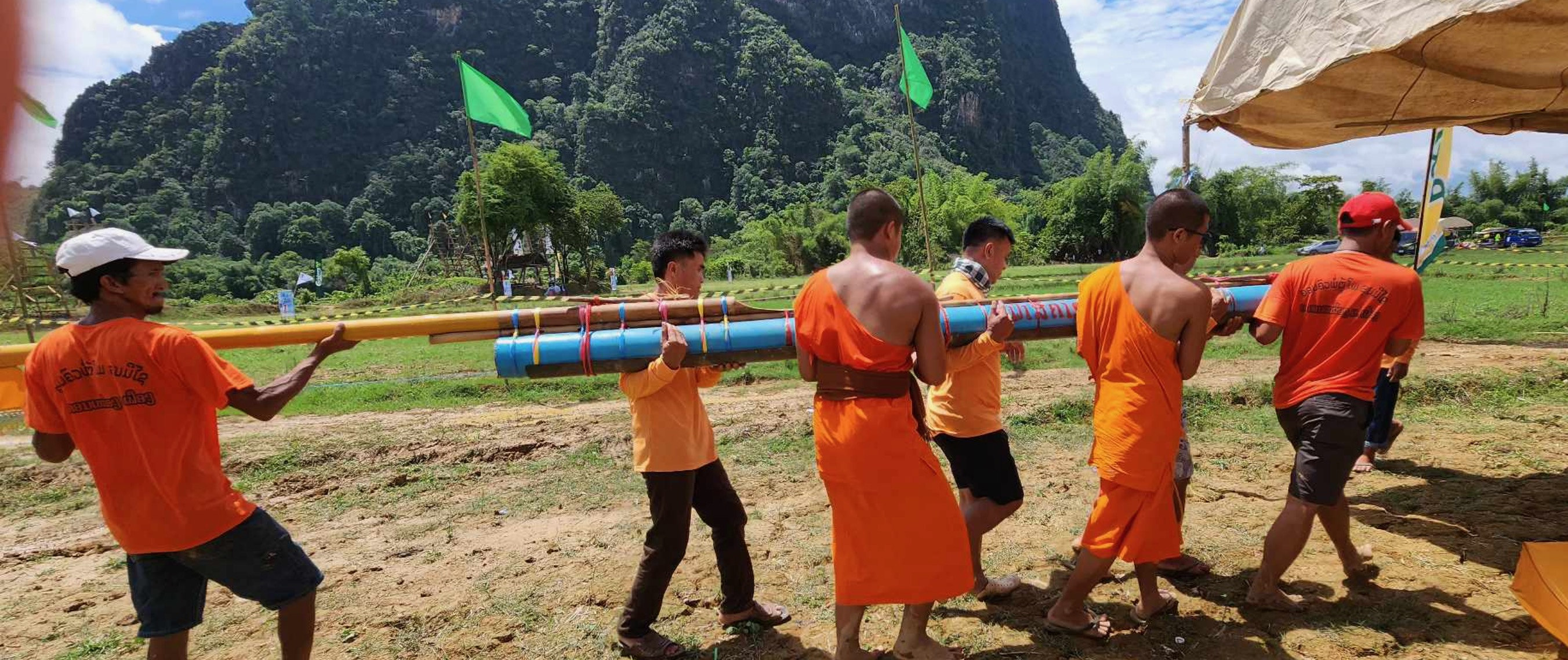
Rockets are prepared for launching

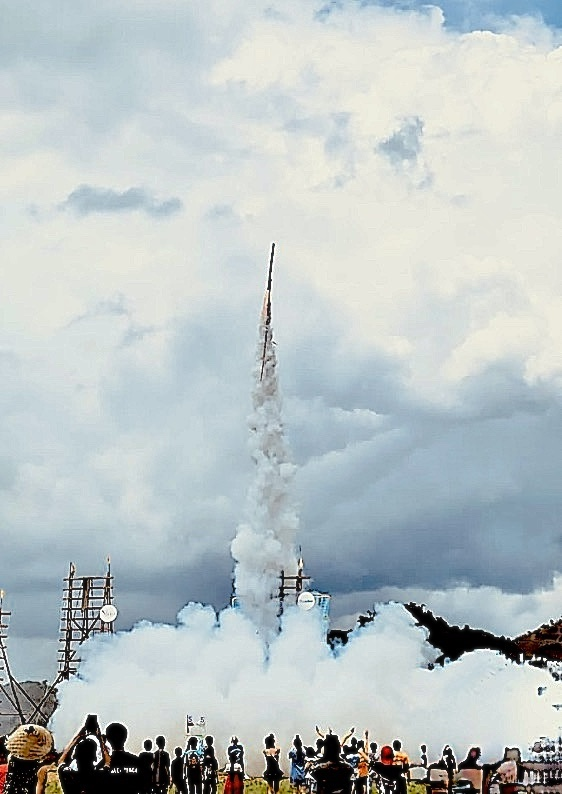
Firing of rockets in Laos

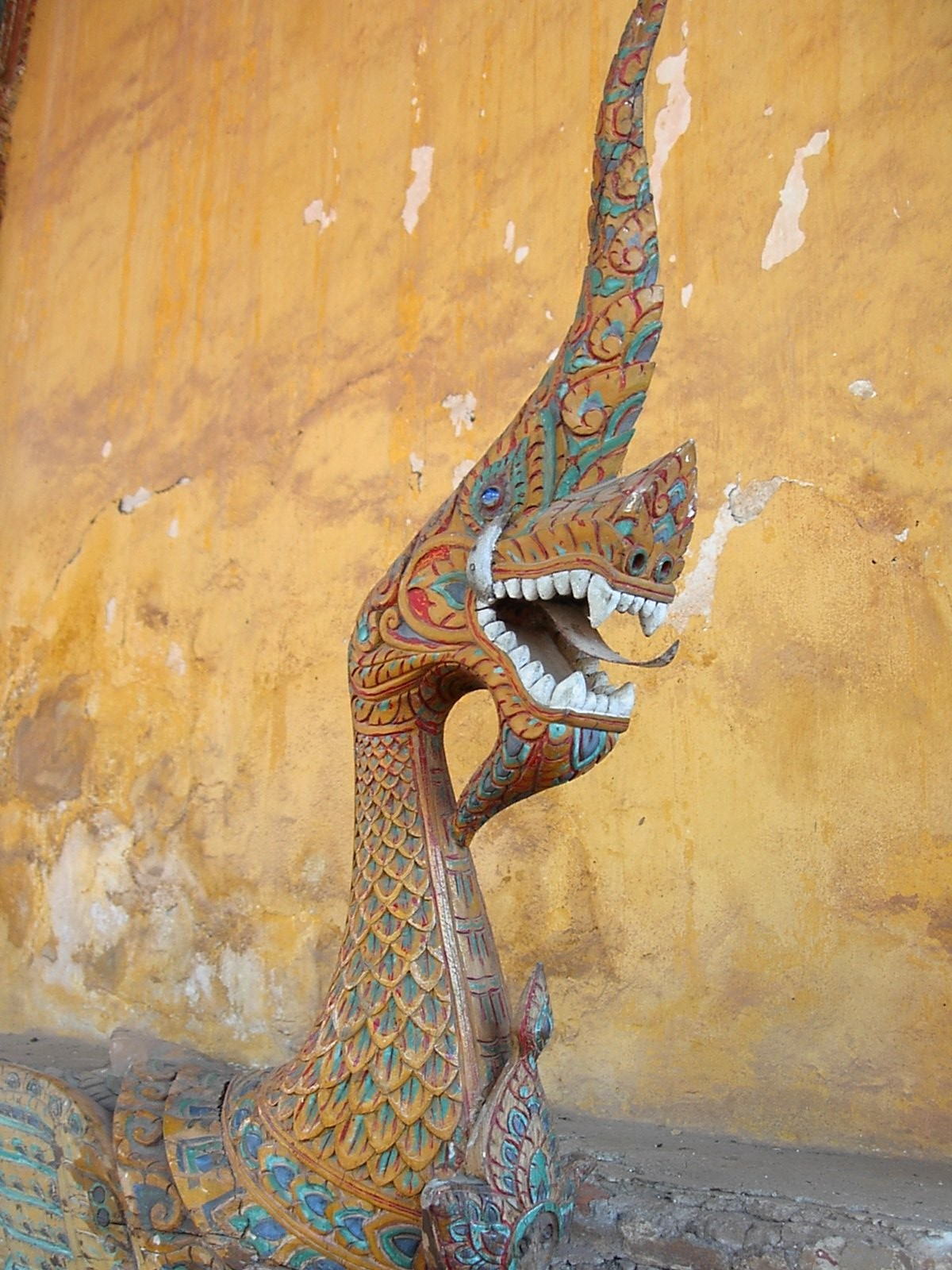
Naga guarding the Viang Chan, Laos, Temple of Wat Si Saket, itself a survivor of an intemperate war in 1827

The religious ceremony is followed by a street parade through the village with pickup trucks displaying the rockets on the sound of the Khene (Lao: ແຄນ), cymbals, and long drums. Teams of contestants dance and chant traditional folksong, with the team's leader chanting first and then the others repeating (Lao: ພິທີເຊີ້ງບັ້ງໄຟ, romanized: Phi Thee Soeng Bang Fai). Contestants are divided into groups based on the size of their rocket. The competition begins with the firing of the rockets skyward. For each rocket category, scores are given based on how high and far the rocket flies. Builders of failed rockets are thrown in a muddy pond and forced to drink Lao-Lao (Lao: ເຫຼົ້າລາວ).

== In the United States and France ==
Following the end of the Vietnam War in 1975, tens of thousands of Lao people left the country as refugees who resettled in other countries, most of them in the United States and in France. The Lao built Lao Buddhist temples (Lao: ວັດລາວ, romanized: Wat Lao) to serve as cultural centers. Traditional Lao holidays such as Lao New Year and Bun Bang Fai are celebrated in addition to the official host countries’ holidays. In France, Bun Bang Fai is celebrated in Paris and other cities; there is a community of Laotians in France. Bun Bang Fai has been celebrated in Bretignolles. In the United States, there are more than forty Wat Lao.

The celebration in both the United States and France lasts two days and proceeds as in Laos, beginning with a religious ceremony followed by a display and parade of rockets in the Wat with traditional Laoof Soeng Bang Faince on the Soeng Bang Fai music. Unlike in Laos, however, the procession does not conclude with the firing of the rockets, as they are not allowed to be launched because of safety measures. Instead, only small, handcrafted rockets are launched.

=== In the National Air and Space Museum ===
Frank H. Winter, curator of the Rocketry Division of the National Air and Space Museum, stated that: "Lao Rocket is special and unique that has a thousand years of traditional celebration associated with this great looking rocket. It would be wonderful to have a Lao Rocket on display in the National Air and Space Museum so that the public can learn from it."

In 2005, Lao Bang Fai was chosen to be displayed at the National Air and Space Museum in Chantilly, Virginia. The deputy abbot of Wat Lao Buddhavong in Virginia acknowledged that "this event is historic and brings recognition and visibility that all Laotians can be proud of". Bun Bang Fai was launched in 1994 by the Lao community and has been celebrated each year since. The religious ceremonies are performed inside the museum on the campus of the University of Washington.

== In Northeastern Thailand ==
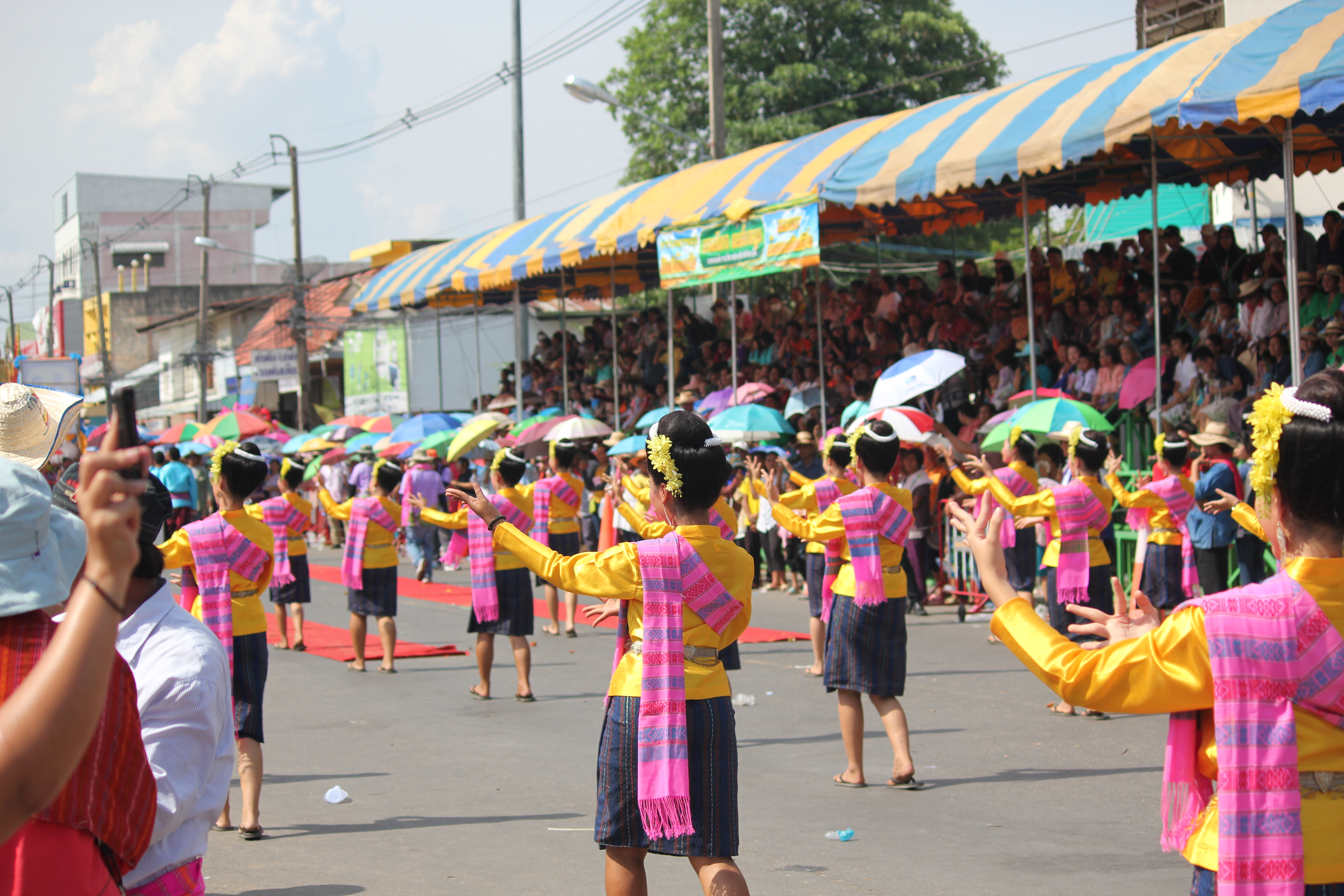
Bang Fai dance in Suwannaphum, Roi Et

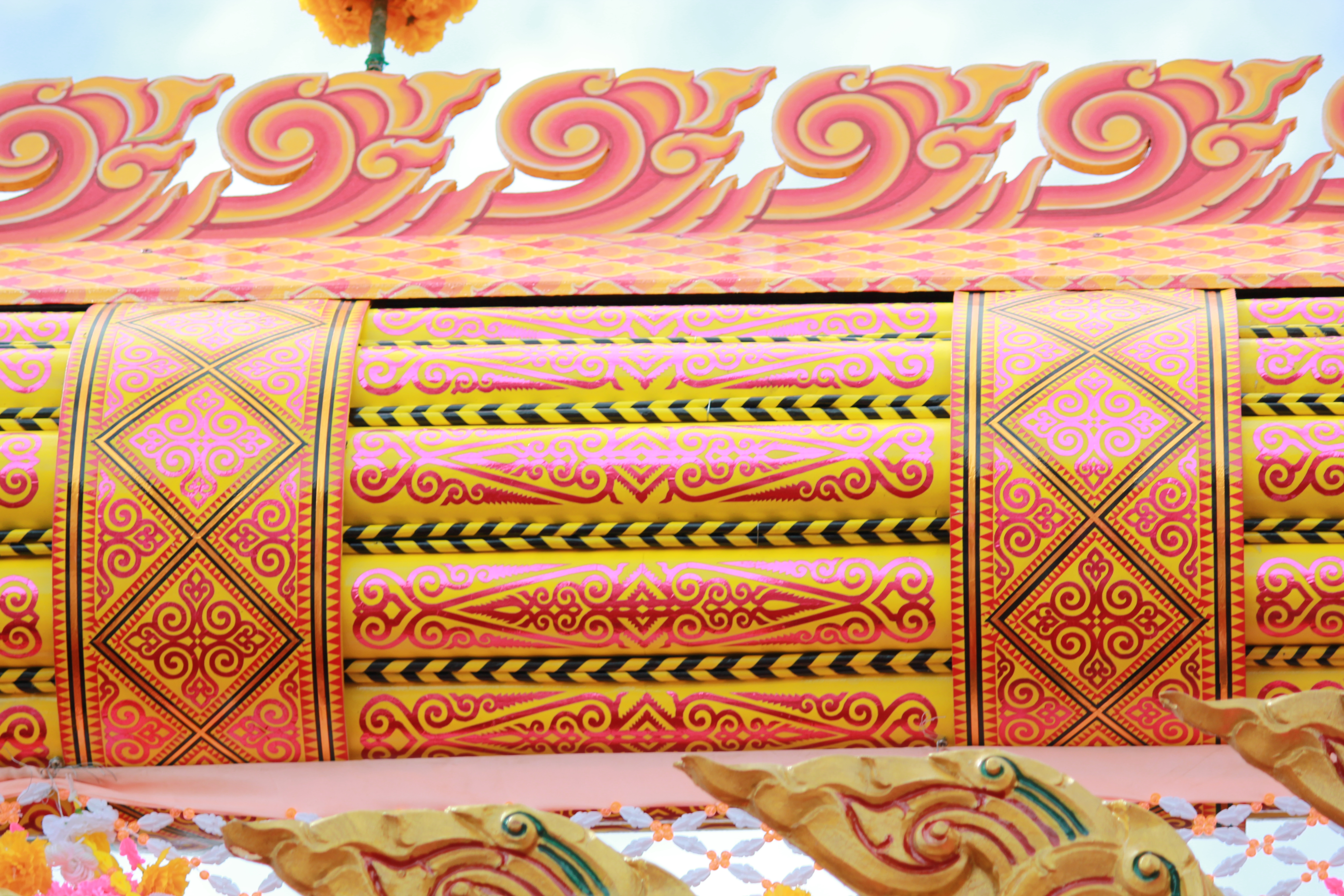
The pattern of Bang Fai Line Sribhumi is made by scissors cutting the line without the broken line.

Villages may have floats conveying government messages. They may also include fairs. In recent years, the Tourism Authority of Thailand has promoted the events, particularly in the Thai provinces of Nong Khai and Yasothon. The Bun bang Fai celebration in the past were in Yasothorn, Roi Et, Kalasin, Srisaket, Mahasarakham, and Udon Thani.

=== Yasothon's festival ===
Since March 1, 1972, the separation of Yasothon from Ubon Ratchathani, Yasothon has staged its Rocket Festival in Thailand annually over Friday, Saturday, and Sunday in the middle of May.

The principal theme of any Hae Bangfai is the Phadaeng and Nang Ai legends. Many floats depict the couple and their retinue. Hàe typically end in a wat, where dancers and accompanying musicians may further compete in traditional folk dance. All groups prominently display the names of their major sponsors. Recalling the fertility rite origins of the festival, parade ornaments and floats often have phallic imagery. The festivities also include cross-dressing, both cross-sex and cross-generational, and alcohol. Perhaps the most popular beverage is a neutral grain spirit called Sura (Thai: สุรา), but more generally known as Lao Whiskey (Thai: เหล้าลาว, Lao lao) in Laos and Lao Khao (Thai: เหล้าขาว, white alcohol) in Thailand. Sato (Thai: สาโท) may also be on offer.

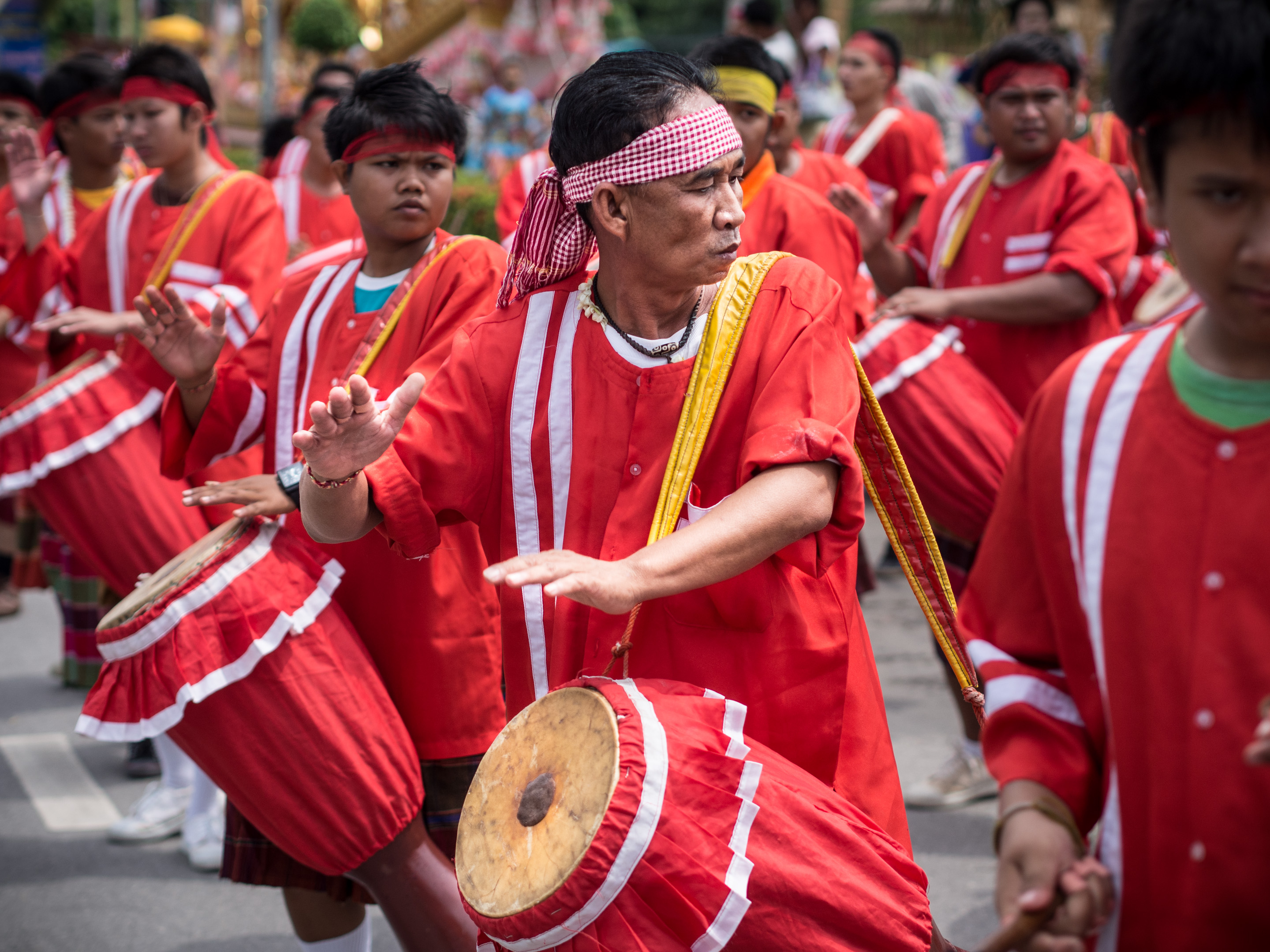
Klong Yao groups in the parade

On May 9, 1999, a Lan 120 kg rocket exploded 50 meters above ground, just two seconds after launch, killing four people and wounding 11.

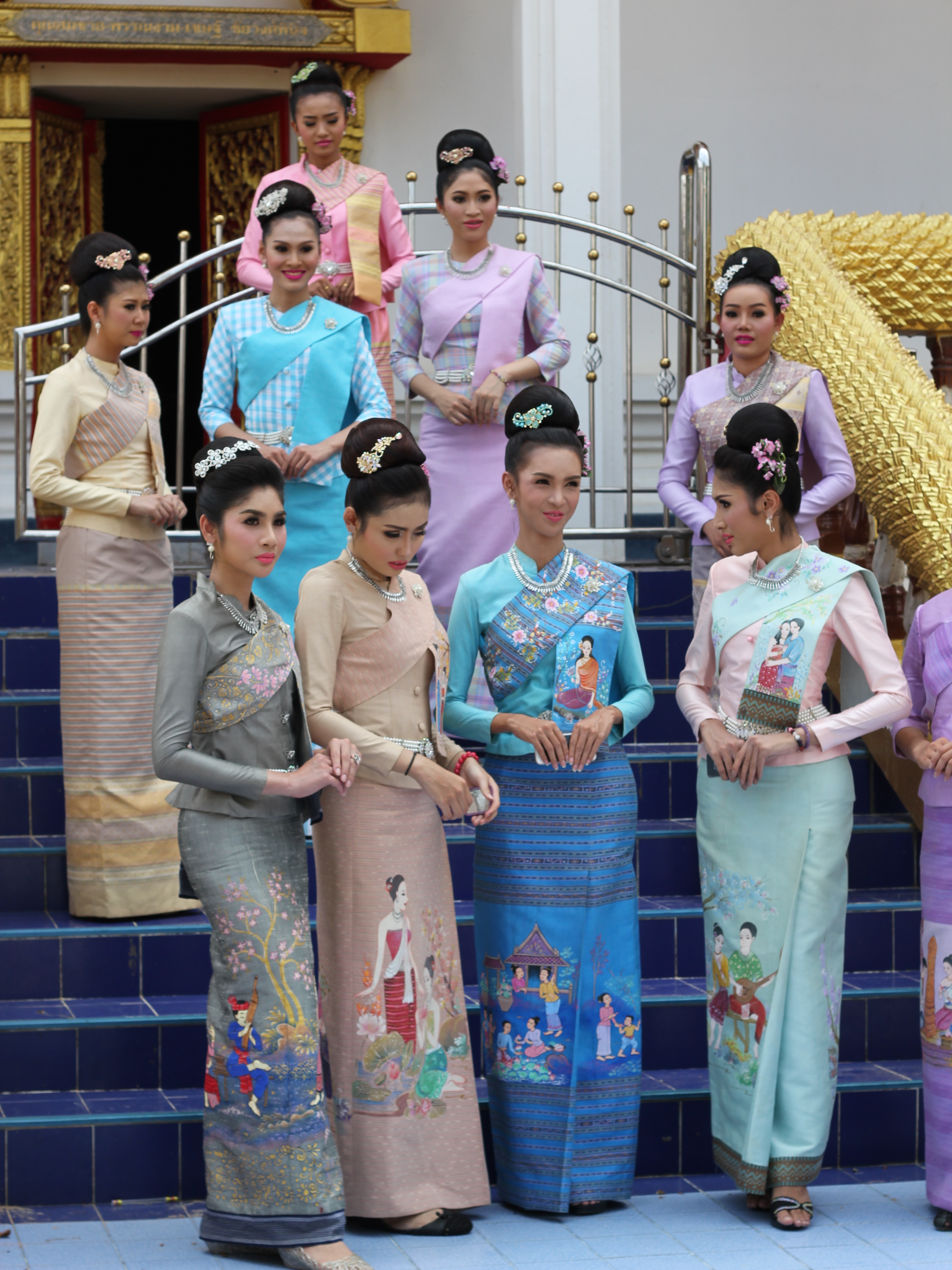
Traditional Thai dress for the Bang Fai parade

== Bang Fai (the rockets) ==
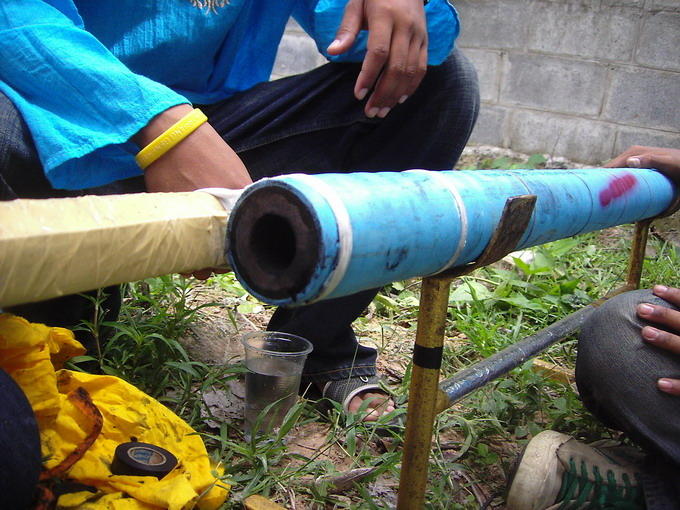
Bangfai Meun showing wooden nozzle

Bang Fai skyrockets are black-powder bottle rockets. Tiny bottle rockets are so-called because they may be launched from a bottle. In the case of the similar appearing Bang Fai, also spelled Bong Fai, the 'bottle' is a bong, and a section of bamboo culm is used as a container (and only colloquially as a pipe for smoking marijuana).

Related to the Chinese Fire Arrow, Bang Fai are made from bamboo bongs. Most contemporary ones, however, are enclosed in PVC piping, making them less dangerous by standardizing their sizes and black-powder charges. Baking or boiling a bong kills insect eggs that otherwise hatch in dead bamboo and eat it. Vines tie long bamboo tails to launching racks. The time it takes for the exhaust to burn through the vines (usually) allows a motor to build up to full thrust; then the tails impart in-flight stability. Ignition comes from a burning fuse or electric match.

Bang Fai come in various sizes, competing in several categories. Small ones are called Bang Fai Noi (Thai: น้อย). Larger categories are designated by the counting words for 10,000, 100,000, and 1,000,000: Meun (Thai: หมื่น), Saen (Thai: แสน), and the largest Bang Fai, the Lan (Thai: ล้าน). Bang Fai Lan are nine metres long and charged with 120 kg of black powder. These may reach altitudes reckoned in kilometres, and travel dozens of kilometres downrange. Competing rockets are scored for the apparent height, distance, and beauty of the vapour trail. A few include skyrocket pyrotechnics. A few also include parachutes for tail assemblies.

== Folktales ==
=== Nang Ai, Phadaeng, and Phangkhi ===
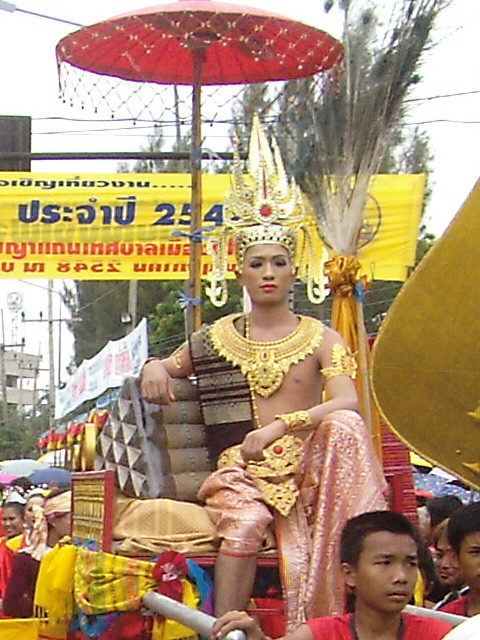
Portrayal of Phangkhi, son of the Naga King

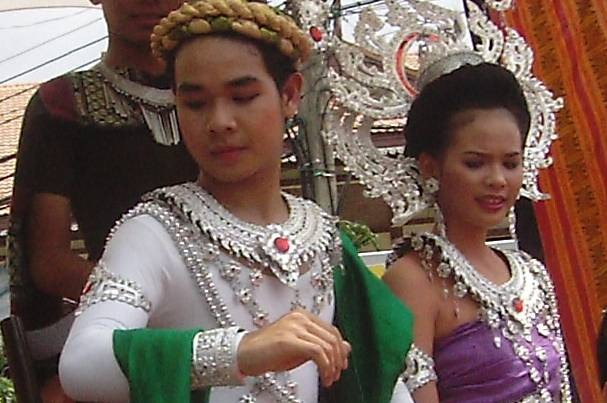
Portrayal of Phadaeng and Nang Ai

Nang Ai (Thai: นางไอ่), or in full, Nang Ai Kham (นางไอ่คำ), is the queen of pageants, and the Phadaeng is her champion. She is known as the most beautiful girl. He, an outsider, wants her, but he must win a rocket festival tournament to win her. He becomes part of a love triangle. Phangkhi and Nang Ai have been fated by their karma (กรรม, kam) to have been reborn throughout many past existences as soulmates. Stories about the couple, however, say that in many past existences, she has been a dutiful wife and that he only wanted to satisfy himself. She becomes fed up and prays never to be paired with him again. Nang Ai is reborn as the daughter of Phraya Khom (พระยาขอม, which means Lord Khmer; but even if her father was a Cambodian overlord, Nang Ai Kham is still the genuine article), while Phangki is reborn as the son of Phaya Nak, the Grand Nāga who rules the Deeps. Phangki is not invited to the tournament, and Phadaeng's rocket fizzles. Nang Ai's uncle is the winner, so her father calls the whole thing off, which is considered to be a very bad omen. Pangkhii shapeshifts into a white squirrel to spy on Nang Ai; she has him killed by a royal hunter.

Pangkhii's flesh transforms into meat equal to 8,000 cartloads. Nang Ai and many of her countrymen ate this flesh, and Phaya Nak vows to allow no one to remain living who had eaten of the flesh of his son. Aroused from the Deeps, he and his watery myrmidons rise and turn the land into a vast swamp. Nagas personify waters running both above and below ground, and nagas run amok are rivers in spate; all of Isan is flooded. Phadaeng flees the flood with Nang Ai on his white stallion, Bak Sam, but she is swept off by Naga's tail, not to be seen again. Bak Sam is seen in parades sporting his stallion's equipage; legend says that he dug a lick called Lam Huay Sam. Phadaeng escapes. His ghost then raises an army of the spirits of the air to wage war on the Nagas. The war continues until both sides are exhausted, and the dispute is submitted to King Wetsawan, king of the North, for arbitration. His decision: the cause of the feud has long since been forgotten, and all disputants must let bygones be bygone.

The legend is retold in many regional variations. One 3000-word poem translated to English "is especially well known to the Thai audience, having been designated as secondary school supplementary reading by the Thai Ministry of Education, with publication in 1978. There is even a Thai popular song about the leading characters." The original was written in a Lao-Isan verse called Khong saan; it has sexual innuendo, puns, and double entendre.

Keyes on page 48 wrote that "Phra Daeng Nang Ai" is a version of Kaundinya, the legendary founder of Funan, and Soma, the daughter of the king of the Nāga. Keyes also wrote that such legends may prove a valuable source of toponyms.

=== Toad King ===
Some said that Bang Fai is launched to bring rain, as in the Tourism Authority of Thailand link. However, a reading of the underlying myth, as presented in Yasothon and Nong Khai, implies the opposite: the rains bring on the rockets. Their version of the myth:

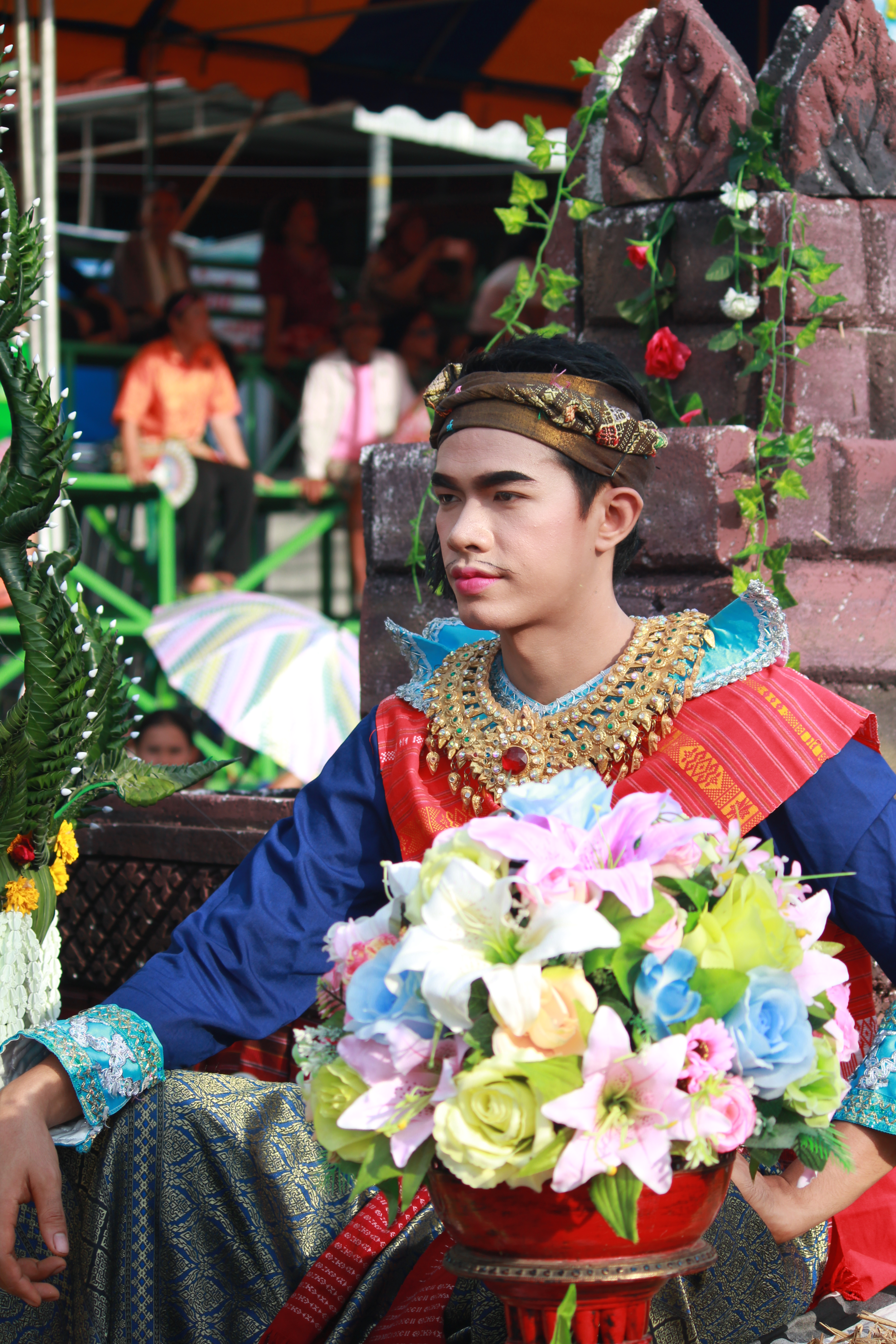
Phaya Thaen

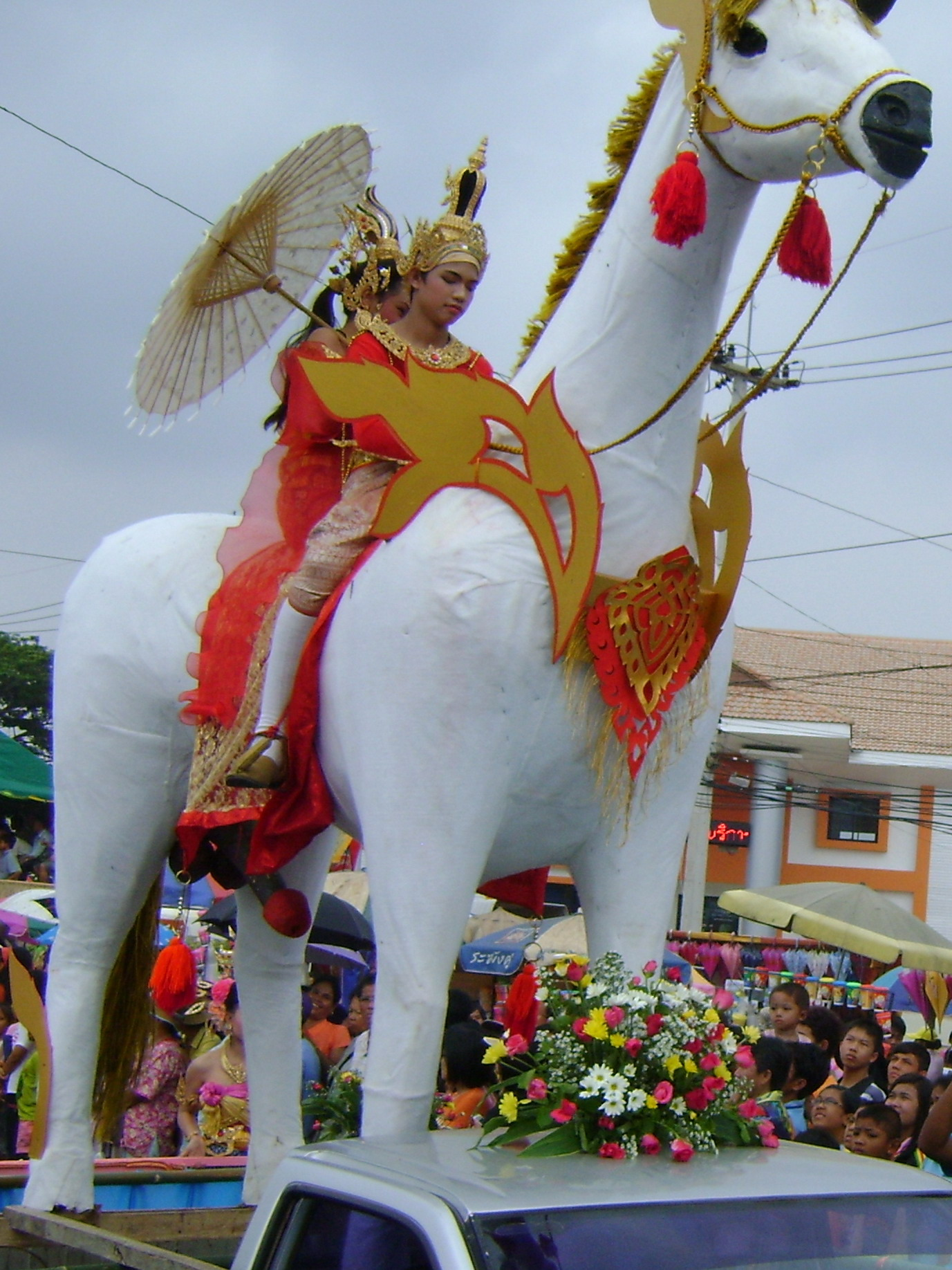
Bak Sam

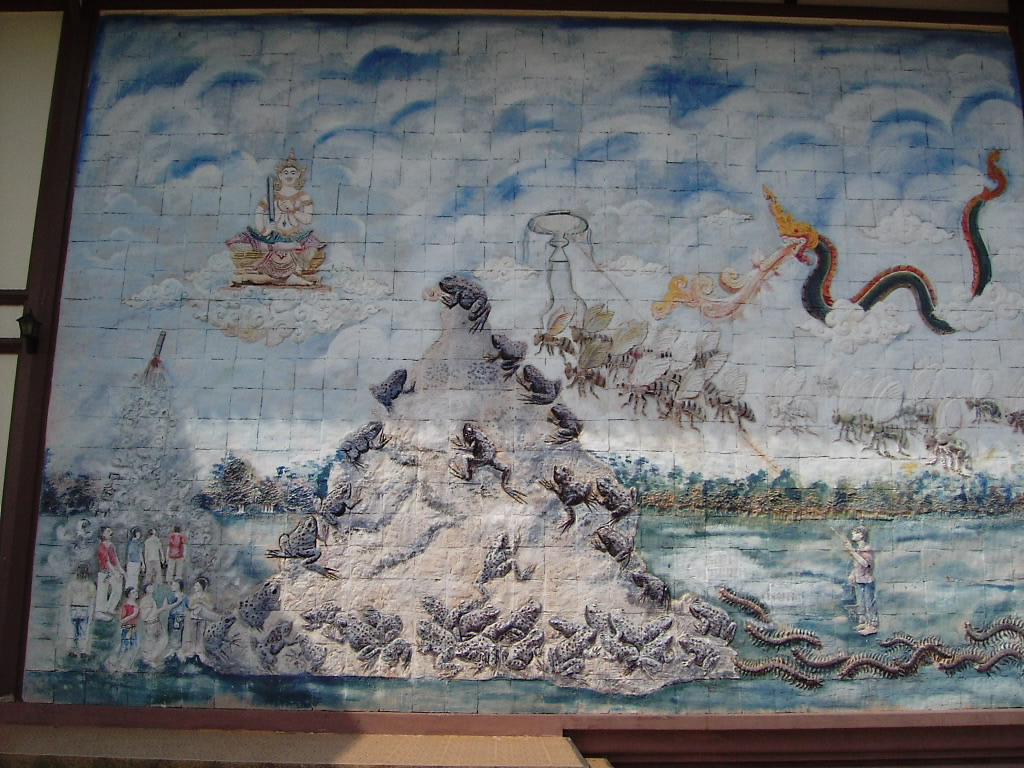
A depiction of King Toad leading the war with Phaya Thaen

When the Lord Buddha was in his Bodhisattva (Pali) incarnation as King of the Toads Phaya Khang Khok, and married to Udon Khuruthawip (Northern Partner-Knowing-Continent), his sermons drew everyone away from Phaya Thaen (Thai: พญาแถน), King of the Sky). Phaya Thaen then withheld life-giving rains from the earth for seven years, seven months, and seven days. Acting against the advice of the Toad King, Phaya Naga, King of the Nāga (and personification of the Mekong), declared war on Phaya Thaen and lost.

Persuaded by Phaya Naga to assume command, King Toad enlisted the aid of termites to build mounds reaching to the heavens, and of venomous scorpions and centipedes to attack Phaya Thaen's feet, and of hornets for air support. Previous attempts at aerial warfare against Phaya Thaen in his own element had proved futile; but even the Sky must come down to the ground. On the ground, the war was won, and Phaya Thaen sued for peace. Naga Rockets fired in the air at the end of the dry season are not to threaten Phaya Thaen, but to serve as a reminder to him of his treaty obligations made to Lord Bodhisatta Phaya Khang Khok on the ground. Phaya Nak was given the duty of Honor Guard at most Thai and Lao temples.

After the harvest of the resulting crops, Wow thanoo, man-sized kites with a strung bow, are staked out in winter monsoon winds. They are also called Túi-tiù from the sound of the bowstring singing in the wind, which sings all through the night, to signal Phaya Thaen that he has sent enough rain. All participants (including a wow thanoo) were depicted on murals on the front of the former Yasothon Municipal Bang Fai Museum, but were removed when it was remodeled as a learning center.

An English-language translation of a Thai report on Bang Fai Phaya Nark Naga fireballs at Nong Khai gives essentially the same myth (without the hornets and wow) from Thai folk.

== Etymology ==
- Bun (Lao: ບຸນ, Thai: บุญ) merit is from Pali Puñña merit, meritorio (पुण्य), ion, virtue, and Sanskrit पुण्य, puṇya, meritorious, good, or virtuous works.
- Bang (Lao: ບັ້ງ, Thai: บั้ง (alternative spelling: บ้อง, bong)) is a cutting, specifically of bamboo.
- Fai (Lao: ໄຟ, Thai: ไฟ) is Fire.
- Prapheni (Thai: ประเพณี) is from Sanskrit परंपर, parampara, meaning an uninterrupted series, regular series, succession 'to be'handed down in regular succession'; from Pali paraṁparā 7795 paraṁparā series, tradition.

== In popular culture ==
The 2006 Thai martial arts film, Kon Fai Bin, depicts the Rocket Festival. Set in 1890s Siam, the movie's hero, Jone Bang Fai ("Fireball Bandit"), is an expert at building the traditional bamboo rockets, which he uses in conjunction with Muay Thai martial arts to defeat his opponents.

Thai political protests in April 2010 similarly had Red Shirts firing bang fai in downtown Bangkok.

In 2013, Vangvieng's Bun Bang Fai was featured in the 2013 film, The Rocket. In the film, a young boy named Ahlo wanted to enter the rocket-making contest, hoping to win a big cash prize and prove that he was not cursed.

== See also ==
- Chinese Fire Arrow for Flying Firelances, bamboo tubes stuffed with black powder; the tube was ignited and used as a flamethrower.
- Black powder
- Gift economy
- Mysorean rockets – military weapons
- Phaya Naga
- Phi Ta Khon ghost festival – includes a rocket festival
- Phra Lak Phra Lam
- Skyrocket
- Thai folklore

== References and notes ==
- Tossa, Wajuppa (1990). Phādāēng Nāng Ai : a translation of a Thai-Isan folk epic in verse. Includes bibliographical references. London and Toronto: Bucknell University Press. ISBN 0-8387-5139-3.
