= Skyrocket =

Type of firework

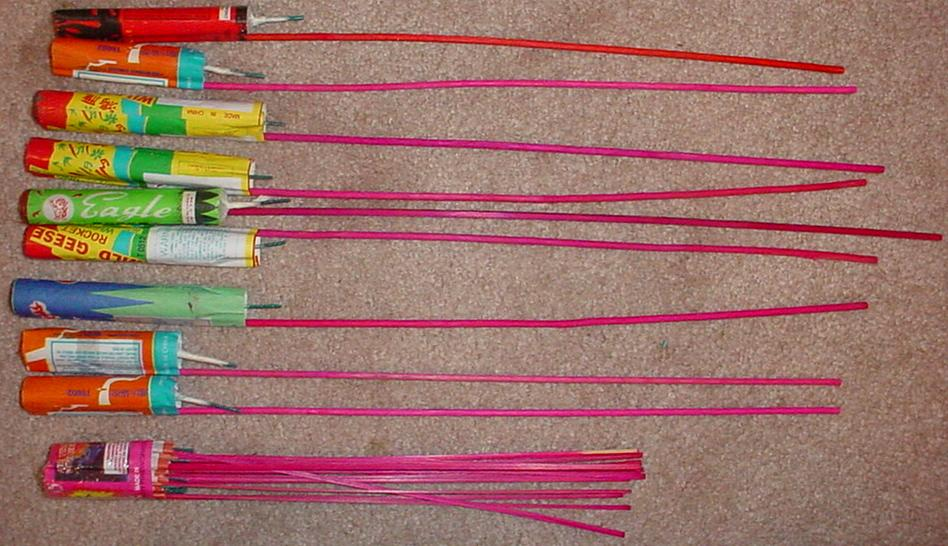
Assorted sky rockets

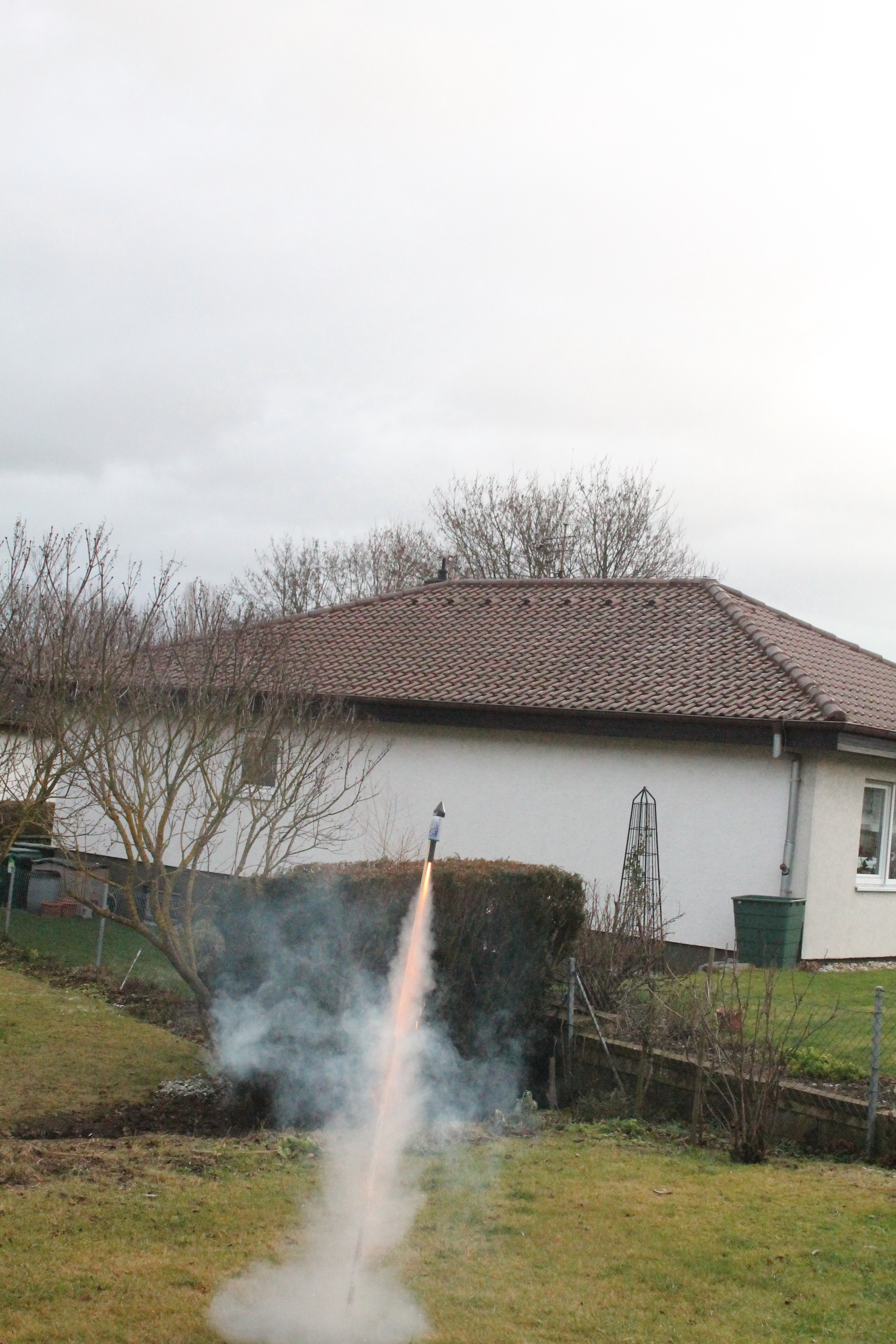
Launch of a bottle rocket

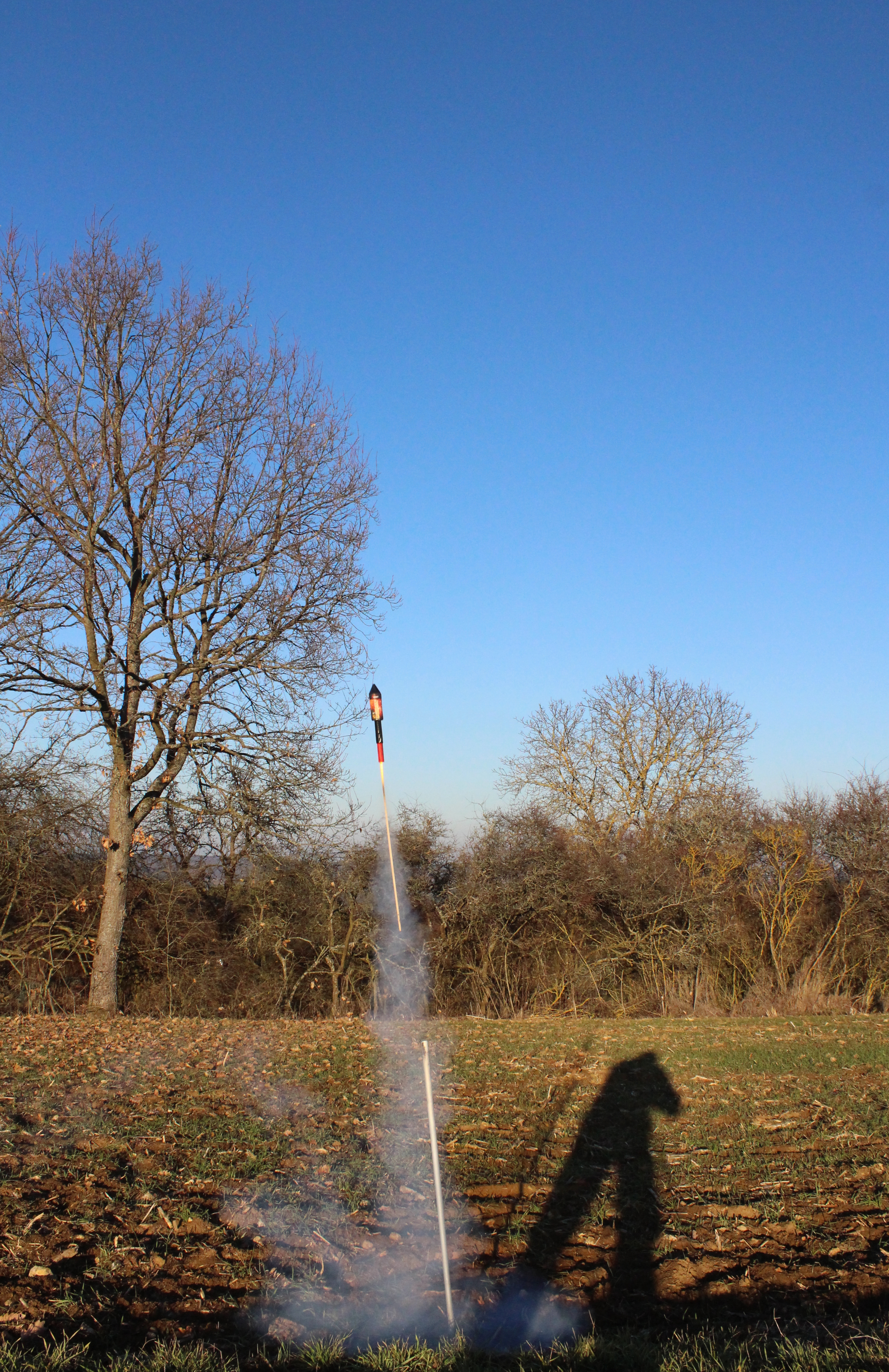
Double-staged bottle rocket

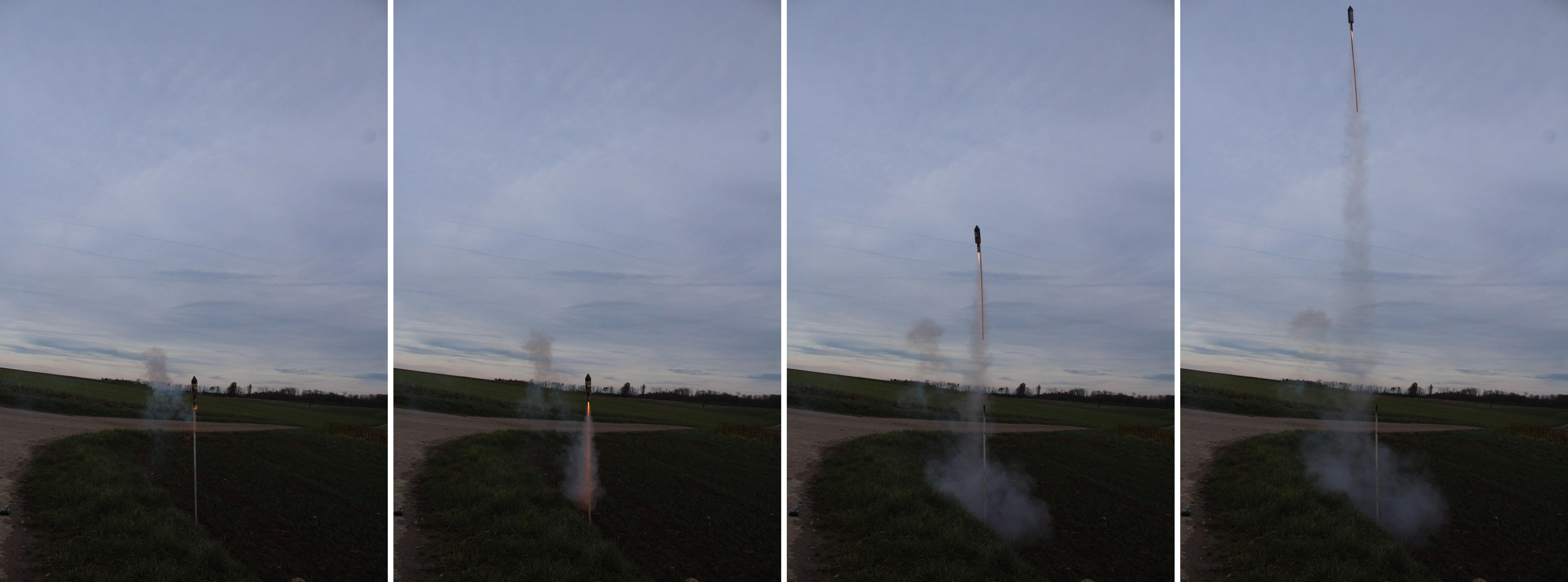
Image sequence of a launch of a skyrocket. The time interval between the images is about 0.1 seconds.

A skyrocket, also known as a rocket, is a type of firework that uses a solid-fuel rocket to rise quickly into the sky; a bottle rocket is a small skyrocket. At the apex of its ascent, it is usual for a variety of effects (stars, bangs, crackles, etc.) to be emitted. Skyrockets use various stabilisation techniques to ensure the flight follows a predictable course, often a long stick attached to the side of the engine, but also including spin-stabilisation or fins.

These rockets have been made at least since the early decades of the 20th century, and in many countries, including Japan and China. The older type of bottle rocket was typically a black powder skyrocket with an engine about 2 inches (5 cm) long and up to 0.375-inch (9-mm) diameter, mounted on a thin bamboo splint and often having a small report charge. Modern bottle rockets are small and very cheap. They are often sold by the box (but more commonly by the pack, or by the gross, a packet of 144 rockets) for less than US$0.20 each.

== Construction ==
A bottle rocket consists of three major parts including:

- The rocket engine will typically use a black powder-type fuel, possibly with additives that produce a decorative spark trail as the rocket ascends, but other chemical reactions have also been used for thrust. The fuel is pressed to form a solid grain inside a cardboard tube, which is sealed at the top but open at the bottom with an air gap. When the fuel is ignited from the bottom, hot gases expand in the air gap and are expelled downward to propel the rocket upward. Other fuels are possible; a common alternative is whistle mix, to produce a whistling rocket.
- The nose cone, in addition to serving an aerodynamic role, typically contains the rocket's payload. This may include exploding fireworks, colored stars, a parachute, confetti, or other decorative items.
- The guide stick, in a bottle rocket lacking fins or other stabilizers, provides stability in flight. The stick's length and weight are sized to achieve this.

== Professional displays ==
A common misconception about professional fireworks displays is that skyrockets are used to propel the pyrotechnic effects into the air. In reality, skyrockets are more widely used as a consumer item. Professional fireworks displays utilize mortars to fire aerial shells into the air, not rockets.

== Sale and regulation ==
Bottle rockets are specifically illegal in many jurisdictions, even those where most other consumer fireworks are legal. They are sometimes considered to present a unique hazard, due to their ability to fly in many directions other than vertically.

=== Canada ===
Bottle rockets are banned under the Explosives Act, thus making importation, possession, transportation, storage or manufacturing illegal in Canada.

=== India ===
In India, bottle rockets are set off during the Hindu festival of Diwali, and are sold in the millions.

=== Norway ===
Skyrockets were officially banned in Norway starting from the New Year's Eve of 2008/09. Skyrockets are strictly forbidden, and carry heavy fines for anyone who are caught launching them.

=== Philippines ===
In the Philippines, Republic Act 7183 was enacted to regulate and to control the sale, distribution, manufacture and use of fireworks and firecrackers for public safety. According to the said law, skyrockets (known in the Philippines as kwitis) are legal and are designed to propel from 40–50 feet (12–15 m) before exploding. Despite being legal, it poses danger to those using it. In 2012, it was recorded that skyrockets were the second most harmful firecracker after piccolo.

=== Thailand ===
In Thailand's Isan region, many are made by hand and sold in conjunction with Rocket Festivals. The largest bottle rockets used at the festivals are Bang Fai rockets which can be up to 20 metres long and charged with up to 500 kg of black powder.

=== United Kingdom ===
In the United Kingdom firework rockets are sold by weight, e.g.: 4 oz (110 g), 8 oz (230 g), 1 lb. This is not the weight of the rocket itself, but rather of a lead sphere whose diameter matches that of the rocket motor. Rocket weight in the UK is officially defined as "the weight of a lead sphere that is just supported by a tube that the rocket motor will just fit into."

== Image gallery ==
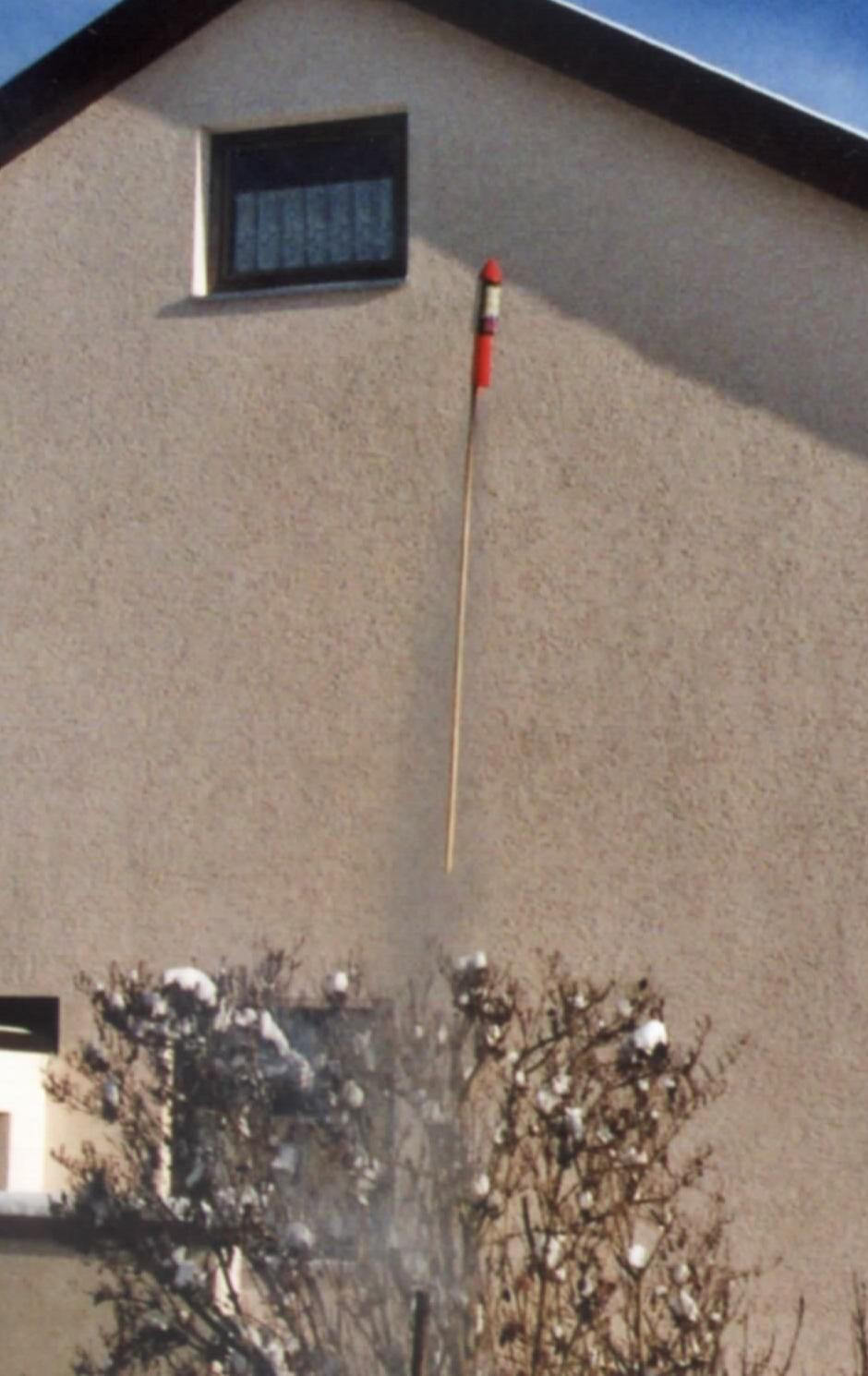
Skyrocket just after liftoff

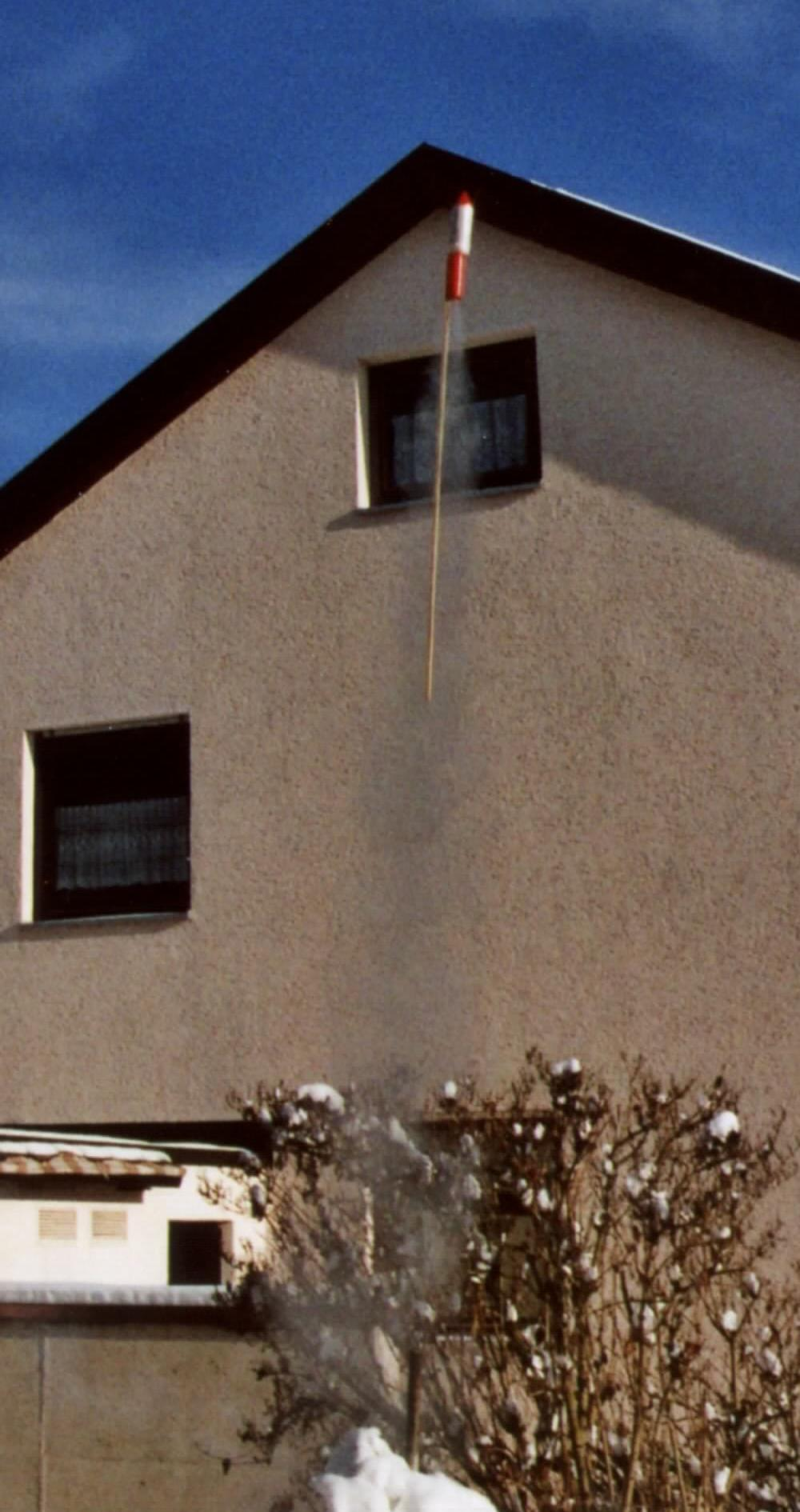
Launching skyrocket

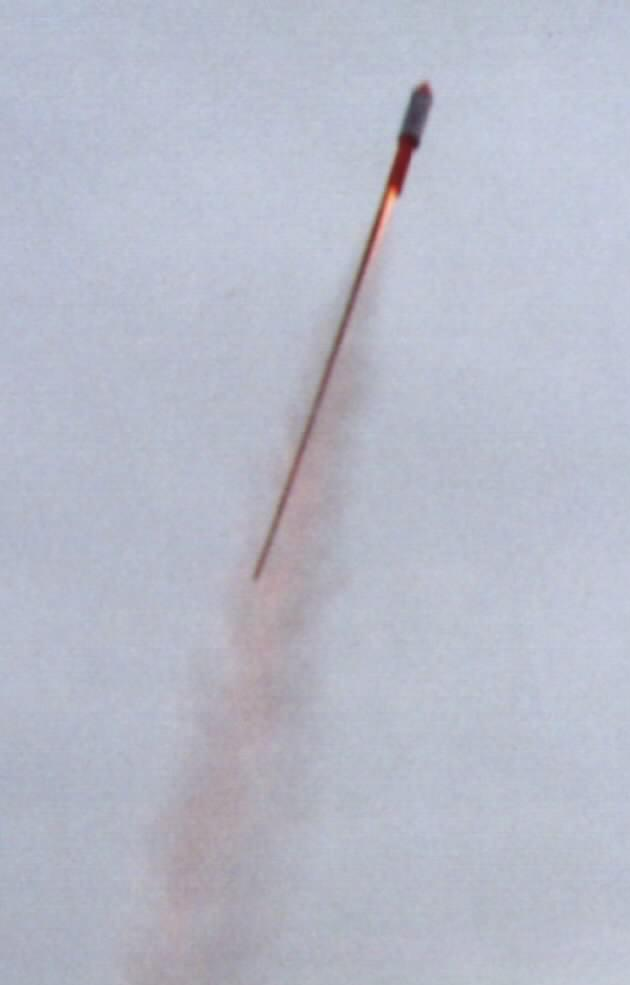
Skyrocket in flight

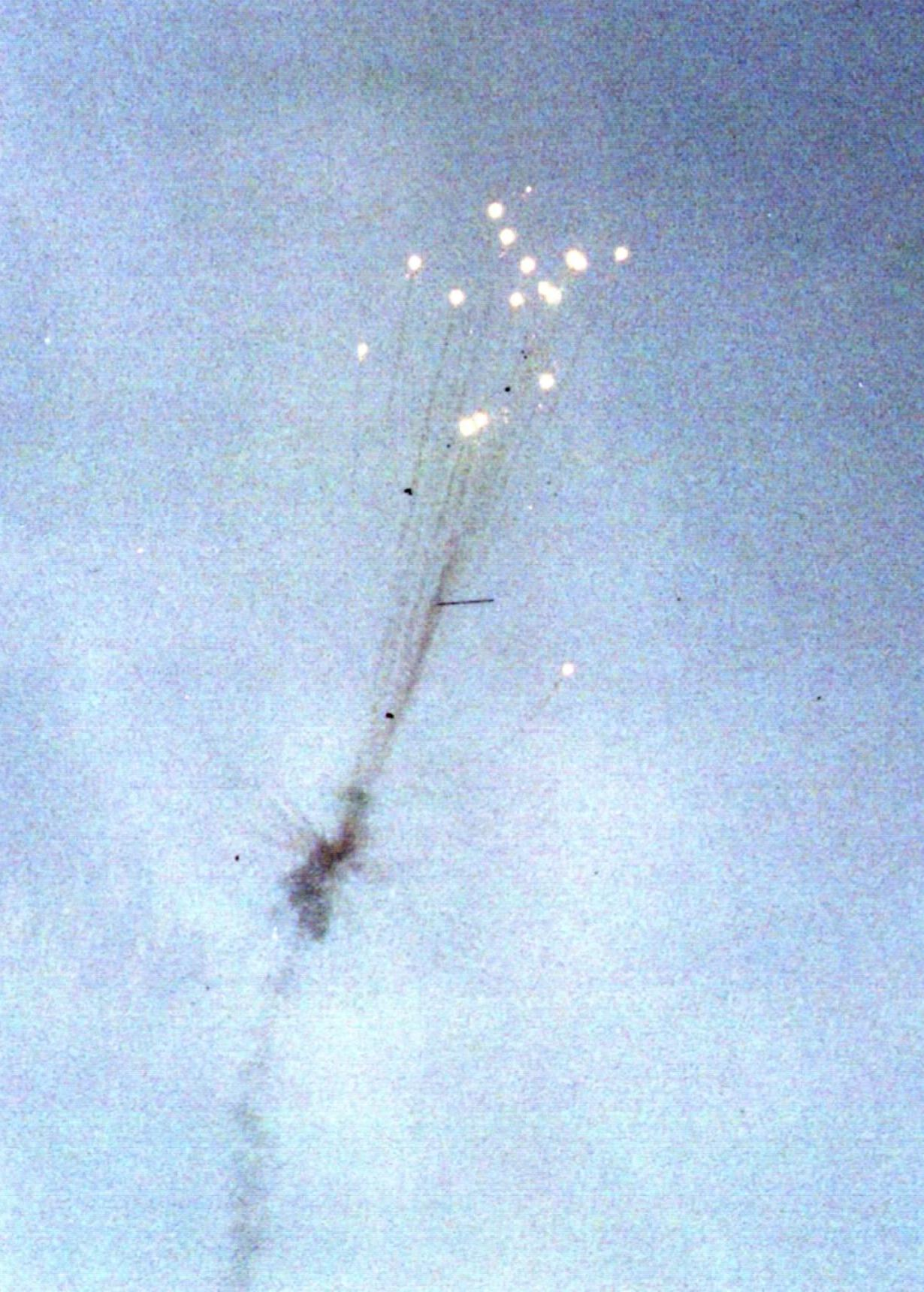
Skyrocket at explosion

== See also ==
- Mysorean rockets
- Water rocket, a model rocket propelled by water and compressed air, sometimes referred to as a "bottle rocket" as they are often constructed from soda bottles.
