= Phi Ta Khon =

Festival in Loei province, Thailand

Ghosts of Phi Ta Khon

Ghosts holding palak khik (penis amulet)

Villagers greet the medium (day 2)

Phi Ta Khon (Thai: ผีตาโขน; phǐi taa khǒn; [pʰǐː taː kʰǒn]) is a festival held in Dan Sai, Loei province, Isan, Thailand. The events take place over three days sometime between March and July, the dates being selected annually by the town’s mediums.

The whole event is called Bun Luang, part of a Buddhist merit-making holiday also known as Bun Phawet (assembly day). The town’s residents invite protection from Phra U-pakut, the spirit of the Mun river. They then hold a series of games and take part in a procession wearing masks made of the sheaths or bottom part of thick palm leaf stems. Bamboo sticky rice steaming baskets are stitched onto the tops of the sheaths to make the top section of the mask. Artists paint the masks with very creative and intricate designs and add carved wooden noses and ear-like appendages. The dancers wear loose and colorful patchwork pants and shirts, with strings of bells hanging down from their belts, in the back. They tease the spectators with big wooden phalluses.

The origins of this part of the festival are traditionally ascribed to a story of the Vessantara Jataka in which the Buddha in one of his past lives as a prince made a long journey and was presumed dead. The celebrations on his return were so raucous as to wake the dead.

The second day of the festival incorporates elements of the Rocket Festival, plus costume and dance contests and more parades.

On the third and final day, the villagers listen to sermons from Buddhist monks.

In recent years, Phi Ta Khon has become not only a deeply traditional event but also a major cultural attraction, drawing visitors from across Thailand and internationally. The festival is held in Dan Sai district, Loei province, which is renowned for its cooler climate and beautiful landscapes, making it an appealing destination beyond the festival itself.

The festival's schedule is determined annually by local spirit mediums, typically falling between late June and early July, coinciding with the rainy season. During the celebration, besides the iconic ghost mask parades and playful dancing, there are also traditional rocket launches which are meant to call for plentiful rain and a good harvest, linking the event to agricultural cycles.

One highlight of the festival is the "Two Big Ghosts" performance—two towering ghost costumes unique to Dan Sai—that lead the ceremonial procession around Wat Phon Chai temple. Wat Phon Chai is also home to the Phi Ta Khon Dan Sai Museum, exhibiting historic masks and costumes and providing cultural and historical context for visitors.

Mask-making workshops have become popular alongside the festivities, allowing tourists and enthusiasts to creatively participate by designing their own masks using traditional materials such as palm leaf sheaths and sticky rice baskets.

Travelers attending the festival are encouraged to explore the vibrant local markets and temples of Dan Sai and to arrive early because accommodation fills quickly during the festival days. Transport options to Dan Sai include flights to Loei airport from Bangkok followed by a short drive, or bus journeys from Bangkok.

The festival uniquely blends spiritual merit-making, Buddhist sermons, folkloric celebrations, and communal joy, representing the heart of Thai Isan culture and continuing to evolve as both a local religious observance and an internationally recognized cultural event.

== See also ==
- Transfer of merit
- Rocket Festival
