= Lam Pao =

River in Thailand

Lam Pao (Thai: ลำปาว, pronounced [lām pāːw]) is a tributary of the Chi River in northeast Thailand.

The river originates at the Nong Han Kumphawapi Lake in Udon Thani Province, from where it flows through Kalasin Province until it flows into the Chi at the boundary between Kalasin and Roi Et Province.

In northern Kalasin the Lam Pao Dam was built in 1963–1968, storing 1,430 million cubic metres (1,160,000 acre⋅ft) of water for flood prevention and agriculture.
