= Fireworks policy of the United States =

Overview of the fireworks policy in the United States of America

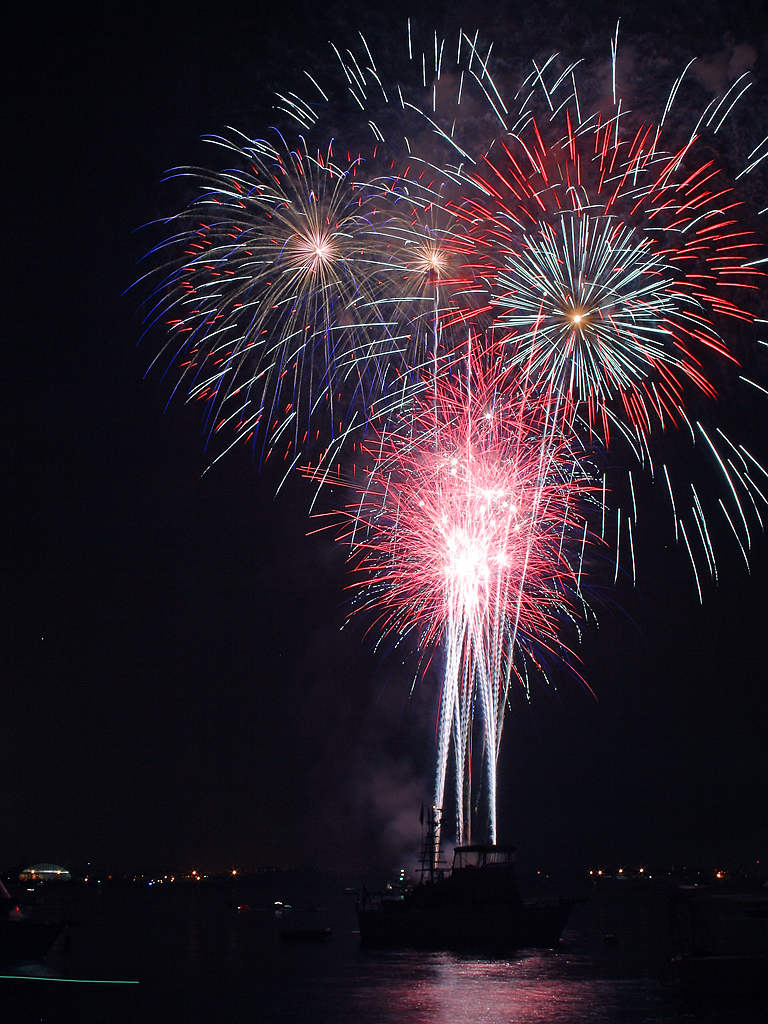
Independence Day fireworks in San Diego, California

Fireworks policy in the United States is governed at both the federal and state levels, and largely varies by jurisdiction.

== Classifications ==
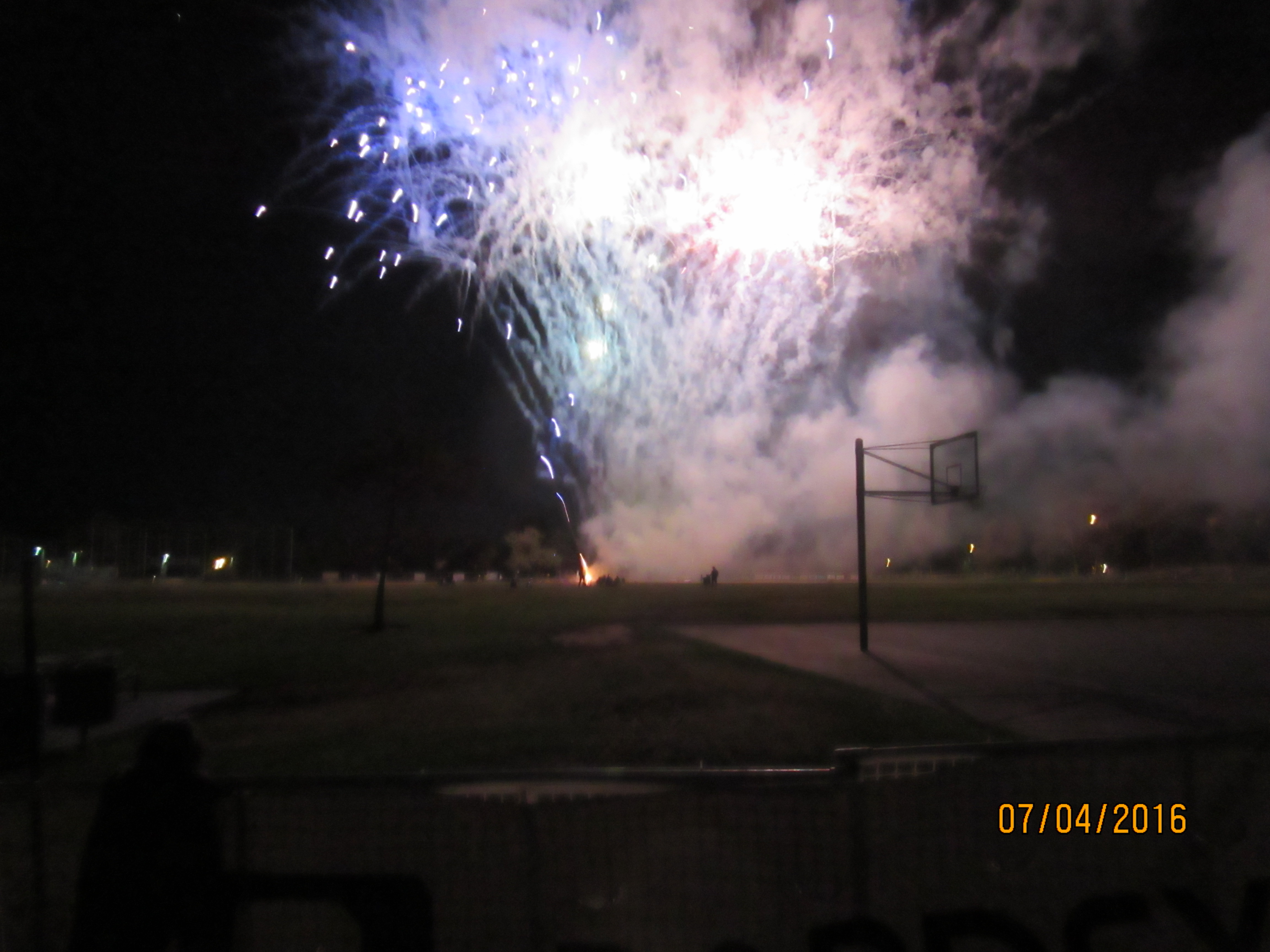
Fireworks being launched on Independence Day in Girsh Park in Goleta, California

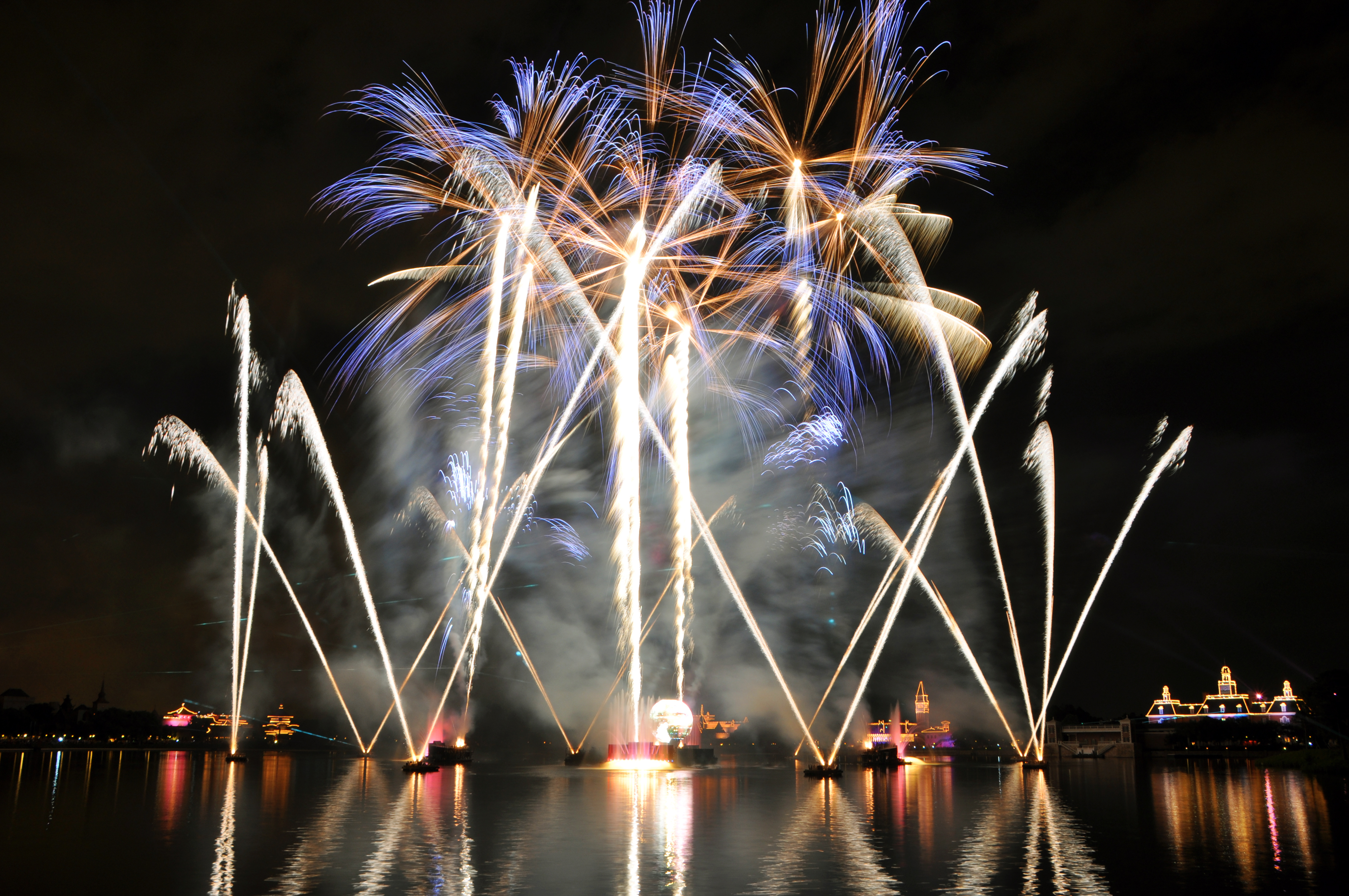
Fireworks at EPCOT in Walt Disney World

The United States government has classified fireworks and similar devices according to their potential hazards.

=== Current explosives classes ===
The U.S. government now uses the United Nations explosives shipping classification system, which is based on hazard in shipping only, while the old US system also covered use hazards. The BATFE and most states performed a direct substitution of Shipping Class 1.3 for Class B, and Shipping Class 1.4 for Class C. This allows some hazardous items that would have previously been classified as Class B and regulated to be classified as Shipping Class 1.4 due to some packaging method that confines any explosion to the package. Being Shipping Class 1.4, they can now be sold to the general public and are unregulated by the BATFE.

A code number and suffix (such as 1.3G) is not enough to fully describe a material and how it is regulated, especially in Shipping Class 1.4G. It also must have a UN Number that exactly describes the material. For example, common consumer fireworks are UN0336, or Shipping Class 1.4G UN0336.

Here are some common fireworks classes:

- Class 1.1G (Mass Explosion Possible:Pyrotechnics) UN0094 Flashpowder
- Class 1.1G (Mass Explosion Possible:Pyrotechnics) UN0333 Fireworks (Salutes in bulk or in manufacture)
- Class 1.2G (Projection but not mass explosion:Pyrotechnics) UN0334 Fireworks (Rarely used)
- Class 1.3G (Fire, Minor Blast:Pyrotechnics) UN0335 Fireworks (Most Display Fireworks) Current federal law states that without appropriate ATF license/permit, the possession or sale of any display/professional fireworks is a felony punishable by up to 5 years in prison.
  - Any ground salute device with over 50 milligrams of explosive composition
  - Torpedoes (except for railroad signaling use)
  - Multi-tube devices containing over 500 grams of pyrotechnic composition and without 1/2" space between each tube
  - Any multiple tube fountains with over 500 grams of pyrotechnic composition and without 1/2" space between each tube
  - Any reloadable aerial shells over 1.75" diameter
  - Display shells
  - Any single-shot or reloadable aerial shell/mine/comet/tube with over 60 grams of pyrotechnic composition
  - Any Roman candle or rocket with over 20 grams of pyrotechnic composition
  - Any aerial salute with over 130 milligrams of explosive composition
- Class 1.4G (Minor Explosion Hazard Confined To Package:Pyrotechnics) UN0336 Fireworks (Consumer or Common Fireworks) Most popular consumer fireworks sold in the US.
  - Reloadable aerial shells 1.75" or less sold in a box with not more than 12 shells and one launching tube
  - Single-shot aerial tubes
  - Bottle rockets
  - Skyrockets and missiles
  - Ground spinners, pinwheels and helicopters
  - Flares & fountains
  - Roman candles
  - Smoke and novelty items
  - Multi-shot aerial devices, or "cakes"
  - Firecracker packs. Although some firecracker items may be called "M-80s", "M-1000s", "Cherry bombs" or "Silver Salutes" by the manufacturer, they must contain less than 50 milligrams of flash or other explosive powder in order to be legally sold to consumers in the United States.
  - Sparklers
  - Catherine wheel
  - black snakes and strobes
  - Mines
- Class 1.4S (Minor Explosion Hazard Confined To Package: Packed As To Not Hinder Nearby Firefighters) UN0336 Fireworks (Consumer or Common Fireworks)
- Class 1.4G (Minor Explosion Hazard Confined To Package:Pyrotechnics) UN0431 ARTICLES, PYROTECHNIC for technical purposes (Proximate Pyrotechnics)
- Class 1.4S (Minor Explosion Hazard Confined To Package: Packed As To Not Hinder Nearby Firefighters) UN0432 ARTICLES, PYROTECHNIC for technical purposes (Proximate Pyrotechnics)

=== Previous US DOT explosives classifications ===
Explosives, including fireworks, were previously divided into three classifications for transportation purposes by the US Department of Transportation (DOT).

- Class A explosives included high explosives such as dynamite, TNT, blasting caps, packages of flash powder, bulk packages of black powder and blasting agents such as ANFO and other slurry types of explosives.
- Class B explosives included low explosives such as "display fireworks" which were the larger and more powerful fireworks used at most public displays.
- Class C explosives included other low explosives such as igniters, fuses and "common fireworks", which were the smaller and less powerful fireworks available for sale to and use by the general public.

At the time most purchases and use of all of these explosives, with specific exceptions for high explosives purchased and used in state, black powder used for sporting purposes and common fireworks, required a license or permit to purchase and use from the Bureau of Alcohol, Tobacco and Firearms (ATF or BATFE), or the state, or a local authority.

== Legal status per state ==
Purchase, distribution and usage of fireworks in the United States by state:
Legal in accordance with the federal law
Region dependent – legal on a state level, though they may be illegal, or heavily regulated, in counties of the state
Minor additional restrictions – ranging from certain types of specific fireworks being forbidden, or a limited quantity only being allowed
Severe additional restrictions – aerial fireworks are outright forbidden for consumers, and minor fireworks may only be allowed with permits
Illegal – completely forbidden for sale, distribution and usage
No data available

Notes:

- Unincorporated Territories are not included.

An example of a consumer firework in California

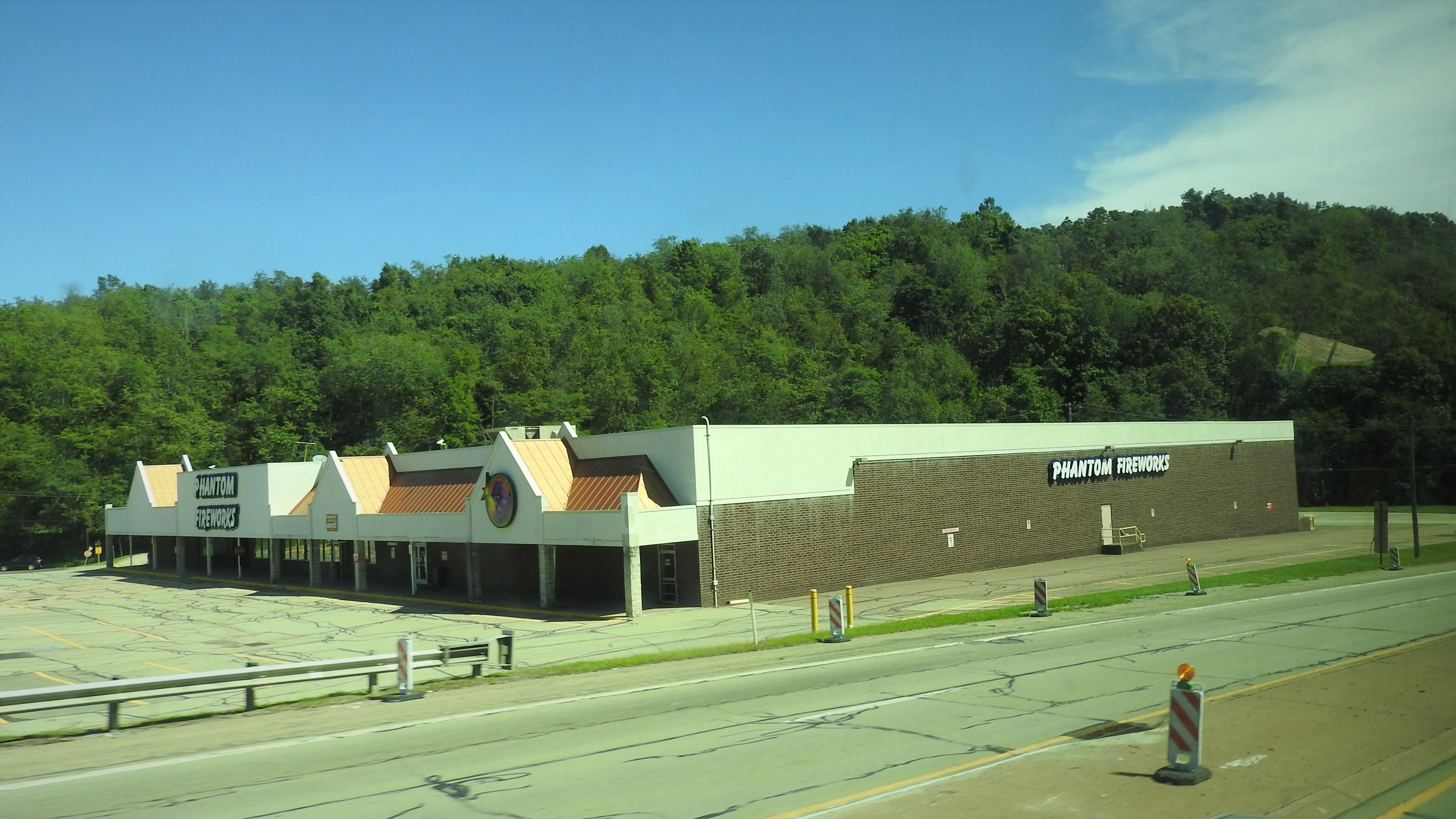
Large fireworks retail shop in Pennsylvania

== Firework consumption trends ==
Since 1976, there has been a general increase in the amount of fireworks consumed, with consumption past 2004 fluctuating until 2020, where it was observed that a large spike in firework consumption was observed. The reason for this spike was primarily due to the effects of COVID-19 pandemic, which caused a decrease of 75% in the usage of display fireworks, yet the consumption of consumer fireworks increased around twice what was seen in 2019. The decrease in display fireworks was due to public events being shut down, which created an effect on consumer fireworks being increasingly used. The majority of firework consumption in the US occurs between June and July, primarily due to Fourth of July celebrations.

== Consumer firework safety ==
Availability and use of consumer fireworks are hotly debated topics. Critics and safety advocates point to the numerous injuries and accidental fires that are attributed to fireworks as justification for banning or at least severely restricting access to fireworks. With the increase in firework consumption, the injury rate has increased from 2.3 per 100,000 persons to 4.3 per 100,000 during 2008 to 2024, however, when looking at the injury rate compared to the amount of fireworks consumed in pounds, the injury rate has decreased from ~26 to ~5 per 100,000 pounds of fireworks from 1976 to 2024. The primary reasons for the decrease in injury when looking at the amount of fireworks consumed are a result of an increase in firework testing and governmental policy that targeted violations of standards and illegal fireworks. Operation Midwest Thunder and Operation Heatstroke were both initiatives of the United States Consumer Product Safety Commission (CPSC) which targeted illegal fireworks that were being shipped to the US. Complaints about excessive noise created by fireworks and the large amounts of debris and fallout left over after shooting are also used to support this position. There are numerous incidents of consumer fireworks being used in a manner that is supposedly disrespectful of the communities and neighborhoods where the users live.

Meanwhile, those who support more liberal firework laws look at the same statistics as the critics and argue that, when used properly, consumer fireworks are a safer form of recreation than riding bicycles or playing soccer, and that due to the consumption of fireworks in the US surging during the period around the 4th of July, the effects of fireworks can be planned for, such as limited timed operations and preparations for fires.

The Bureau of Alcohol, Tobacco, Firearms and Explosives (ATF) as well as the Consumer Product Safety Commission (CPSC) have general jurisdiction over what types of fireworks may be legally sold in the United States.

The CPSC has guidelines concerning the standard of consumer fireworks sold in the US. Together with US Customs, they are proactive in enforcing these rules, intercepting imported fireworks that don't comply and issuing recalls on unacceptable consumer fireworks that are found to have "slipped through". The ATF is the federal agency that regulates explosives, including Display Fireworks in the US, but, the ATF does not regulate consumer fireworks which conform to CPSC standards.

The federal law is only the minimum standard however, and each state is free to enact laws that are more stringent if they so choose. Many states have laws which further restrict access to and use of consumer fireworks.

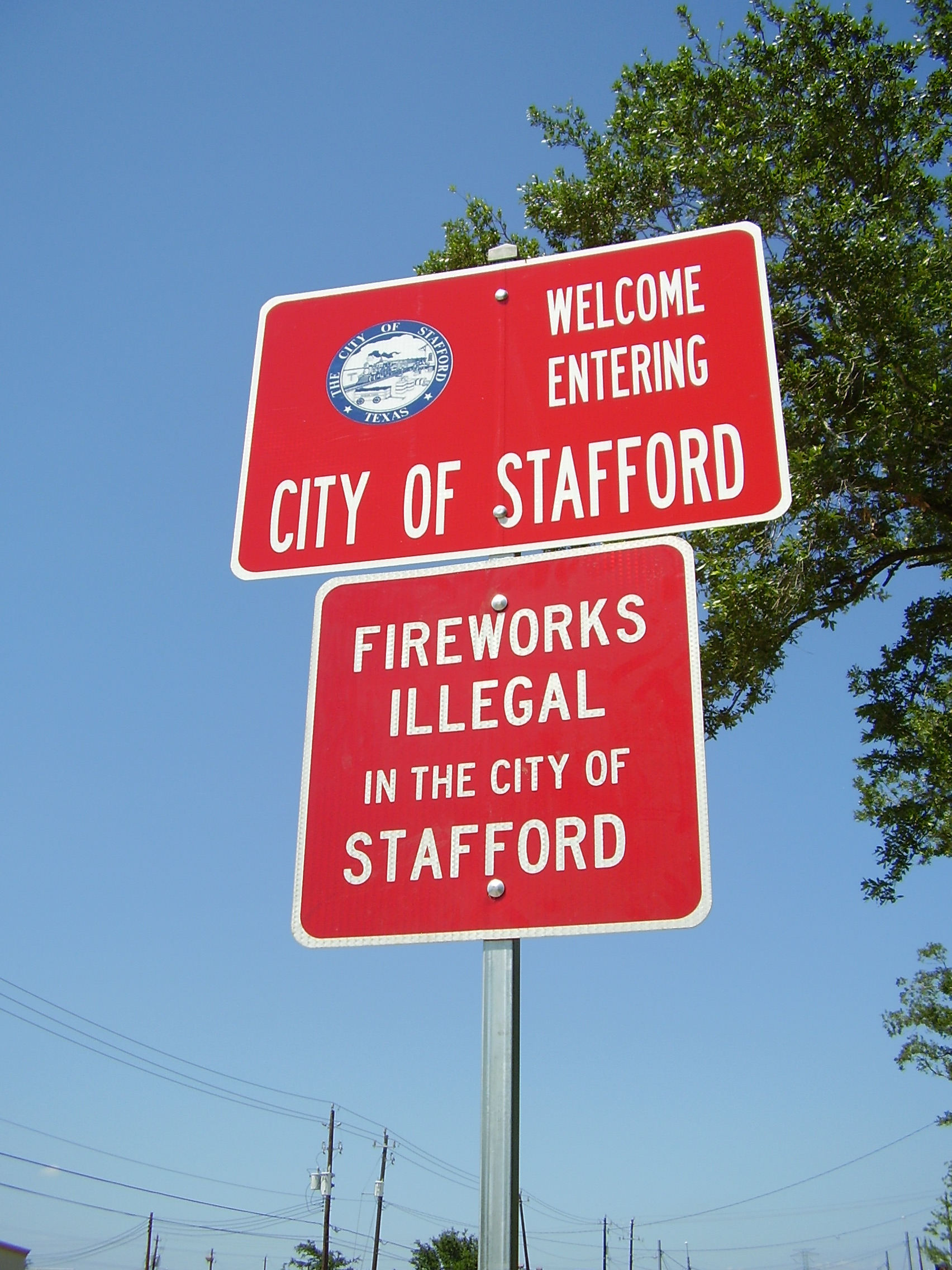
Consumer fireworks are illegal in Stafford, Texas.

Citing concerns over fireworks safety, some states, such as California, have enacted legislation restricting fireworks usage to devices that do not leave the ground, such as fountains. North Carolina limits fireworks to a charge of 200 grams of black powder. Massachusetts bans all consumer fireworks completely. Rhode Island, Arizona, New York, New Jersey, and Delaware have passed bills legalizing certain types of small fireworks. Vermont only allows sparklers. On the other hand, states such as Maine, South Dakota, South Carolina, Kentucky and Tennessee allow most or all legal consumer fireworks to be sold and used throughout the year. New Mexico allows all federally legal fireworks under state law; however, individual cities and counties may restrict or ban fireworks within their boundaries either permanently or when certain conditions exist.

Additionally, pollution that comes from fireworks in the form of particulate matter is primarily felt in denser areas, such as inner-city areas that hold onto the particulate matter longer and result in higher amounts of it within the air compared to other, less dense areas, which may affect the legislation in those areas.

The legal age of purchase ranges widely from state to state. Most state adopts 18 years old as the age to purchase, but four states, Arkansas, Mississippi, North Dakota, and Oklahoma, have age to purchase at 12 years old. Missouri's age of purchase is 14 years old without a parent or guardian, implying children younger could purchase fireworks if accompanied by a parent or guardian.

Some states such as vigorously enforce these laws, such as New Jersey, where each year there are many raids on individuals suspected of illegally possessing fireworks.

Differences in legislation among states have led to many fireworks suppliers setting up shop along state borders, to sell to customers from neighboring states where fireworks are restricted. Illinois only permits small fireworks, such as sparkler and plastic or paper caps. However, many users travel to neighboring states such as Indiana, Missouri, Kentucky, and Wisconsin to obtain fireworks for use in Illinois. This situation is similar to the plight of many St. Louis residents as fireworks are illegal within both city and county limits. However, fireworks are readily available in nearby St. Charles County.

Within states that prohibit or restrict the sale of fireworks, some Native American tribes on reservation lands are able to sell fireworks that would be illegal in the rest of the state, depending on their own local laws, due to their limited sovereignty. This creates a way for native areas to generate extra revenue during periods of high demand for fireworks; however, due to the lessened restrictions, this also contributes to fires which are caused by fireworks, with the majority of such fires in the US occurring on tribal land.

== Display fireworks safety ==
Federal, state, and local authorities govern the use of display fireworks in the United States. At the federal level, the National Fire Protection Association (NFPA) sets forth a set of codes which give the minimum standards of display fireworks use and safety in the US. Both state and local jurisdictions can further add restrictions on the use and safety requirements of display fireworks. Typically, these jurisdictions will require a licensed operator to discharge the show. Although requirements vary from state to state, licensed operators and their crew are typically required to have hours of extensive training in the safe use of display fireworks.

These codes can include, but are not limited to, distance from the audience, maximum size shell, firing location requirements, electrical firing system requirements, and the minimum safety gear to be worn by the fireworks crew. These guidelines are explained in the NFPA 1123 fireworks code.

== See also ==
- Fireworks policy in the European Union
