= Bang snaps =

Small firework thrown for amusement

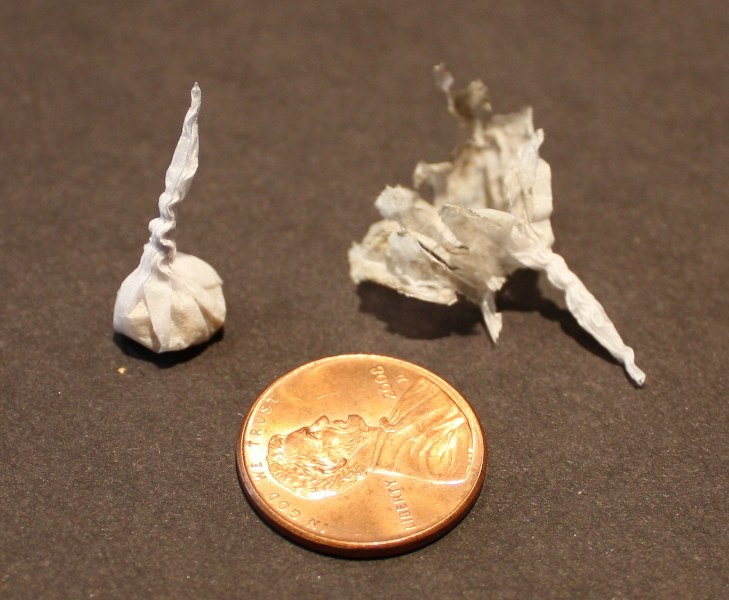
Two commercially produced bang snaps with a US penny for scale. The right one has been used and the left one is unused.

Bang snaps (known as poppers or whipper snappers) are a type of small novelty firework sold as a trick noisemaker.

== Composition ==
Bang snaps consist of a small amount of gravel or coarse sand impregnated with a minute quantity (~0.2 milligrams) of silver fulminate high explosive and twisted in a cigarette paper to produce a shape resembling a cherry.

== Effect ==
The friction-sensitive silver fulminate detonates when stepped on, ignited, or thrown on a hard surface, producing a sharp salute similar to a cap gun's.

Despite producing a legitimate (albeit tiny) high-explosive detonation, the extremely high mass ratio of gravel to explosive acts as a buffer to ensure that they only produce the audible "crack" of the supersonic shockwave; they are incapable of producing physical damage, even when discharged in the hand. The explosion is unable to propel the gravel any distance, which usually falls to the ground. This makes them safe for use as a children's toy, for which purpose they have been widely sold around the world since the 1950s.

== Availability ==
Bang snaps are primarily produced alongside other export fireworks in Brazil, South Korea and China and are widely available over the counter at small toy stores and shops specializing in jokes, novelties and magic tricks. The snaps are typically packed in sawdust to prevent them from discharging due to rough handling while in transit.

In the UK they are advertised as fun snaps, and sold only to people 16 or above. Some US states and counties impose the same age restrictions on purchasing bang snaps as that of permitted fireworks, usually 17 or 18.

They are also a common part of Chinese New Year celebrations.

== See also ==
- Salute (pyrotechnics)
- Silver fulminate
- Firecracker
- Cap pistol
