= Quarter stick =

Pyrotechnic device

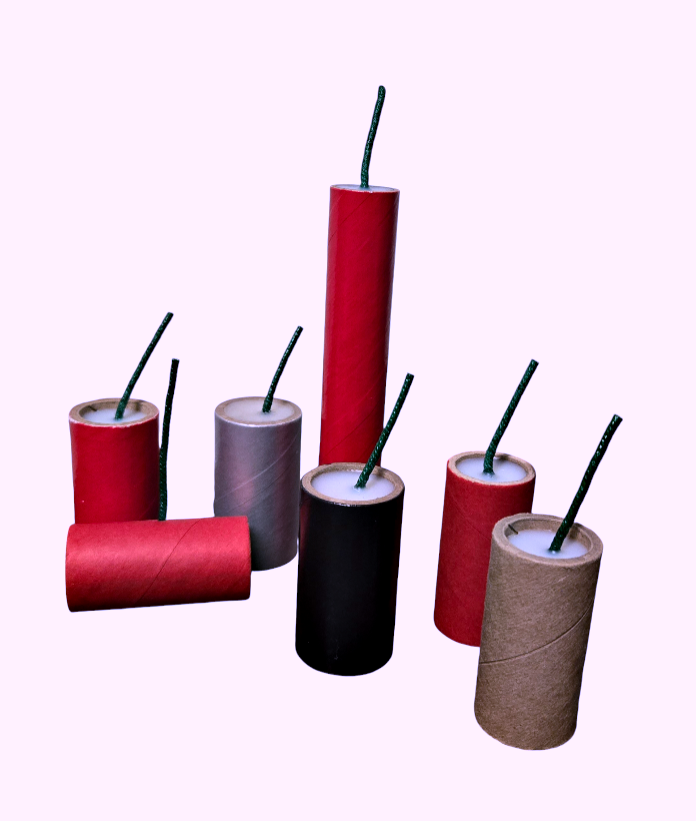
Quarter sticks in different sizes

A quarter stick, colloquially known as the M-1000, is a large firecracker that falls within a range of dimensions roughly between 1" × 2 1/2" and 3/4" × 6". These salutes typically carry 25 grams of flash powder but in rare occasions have been measured and can contain upward to 30 grams. Like the others, a piece of visco fuse 2 to 4 inches protrudes from the end or side.

The term quarter stick is based on the firecracker's resemblance to a quarter-stick of dynamite. However, unlike dynamite, quarter stick firecrackers do not contain nitroglycerin, and have far less explosive power.

In the United States, quarter sticks and similar large firecrackers are illegal to manufacture for sale, distribution, or for business use without a High Explosives Manufacturing License issued by the Bureau of Alcohol, Tobacco, Firearms and Explosives (ATF). However, they are legal to make and possess for personal use.

== See also ==
- M-80
- M-100
- Salute (pyrotechnics)
- Fireworks policy of the United States
