= M-100 (explosive) =

Pyrotechnic device

M-100s are a class of powerful firecrackers commonly called salutes.

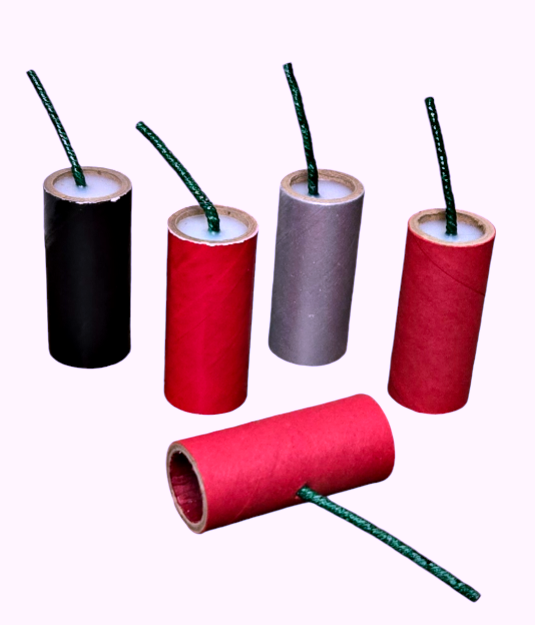

== Description ==
M-100s consist of a cardboard tube 2 1/8" × 3/4". Colors may vary. They contain 10 grams of flash powder that is ignited via a visco fuse positioned in the center or side of the tube. In some cases, they are maxed out at 15 grams which is the physical limit for a 2" × 3/4" tube. They are among the most common flash salutes put into use in the United States around the 4th of July. M-100s are significantly more powerful than M-80s, which contain around 3 to 5 grams.

In the United States, M-100s are illegal to manufacture, possess, and sell without a proper license, and are regulated by the Bureau of Alcohol, Tobacco, Firearms, and Explosives (ATF). M-100s were first banned by the Child Protection Act of 1966.

== Accidents ==
In 1983, an explosion at a secret unlicensed fireworks factory which manufactured M-80 and M-100 fireworks near Benton, Tennessee, killed 11 people and injured one, and inflicted damage within a radius of several miles. The operation was the largest-known illegal fireworks operation in US history, and the initial blast was heard as far away as 20 miles (32 km) from the site.

== See also ==
- M-80 (explosive)
- Quarter stick (also known as an M-1000)
