= M-80 (explosive) =

Pyrotechnic device

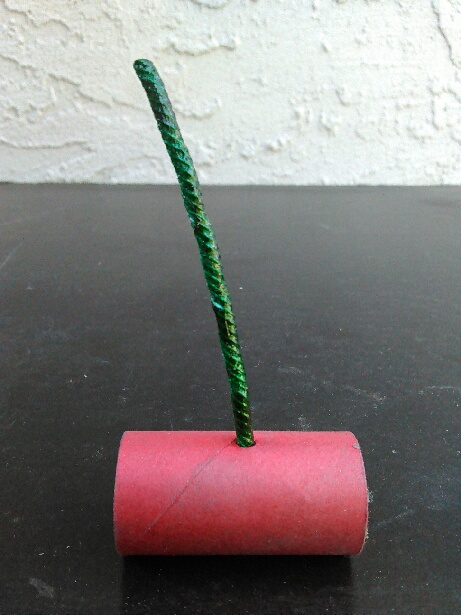
M-80

M-80s are an American class of large powerful firecrackers, sometimes called salutes. M-80s were originally made in the mid 20th century for the U.S. military to simulate explosives or artillery fire. The "M" is designated by a U.S. military convention for "standard" equipment and "80" is for the 80 grains (5.2 grams) of flash powder within it. Later, M-80s were manufactured as consumer fireworks made from a small cardboard tube, often red, approximately 1 1/2 inches (3.8 cm) long and 9/16 inch (1.4 cm) inside diameter, with a fuse coming out of the side; this type of fuse is commonly known as cannon fuse or Visco fuse, after a company responsible for standardizing the product. The consumer version holds a reduced charge of 45 grains (approximately 3 grams) of pyrotechnic flash powder.

== Legality ==
=== Canada ===
M-80s are not authorized under the law, making importation, possession, transportation, storage, or manufacture of them illegal in Canada.

=== United States ===
Regulation of M-80s in the United States began in 1966 with congressional hearings proposing amendments to the Federal Hazardous Substances Labeling Act in response to several cases of property damage and bodily harm caused by unregulated fireworks. The resultant Child Protection Act of 1966, with help from the Consumer Product Safety Commission, set groundwork for policies that would later regulate M-80s as ground-based "consumer fireworks," enforced by the ATF.

Per the ATF, possession of such fireworks containing a charge in excess of 50 milligrams of pyrotechnic flash powder (such as M-80s) require a license issued by federal authorities. This law extends to M-100s, quarter sticks, cherry bombs, and silver salutes, among other pyrotechnics.

In 1975, federal regulations were passed to limit all consumer-grade fireworks available for general sale to the public in the United States to a maximum of 50 milligrams flash powder, down from a previous maximum of 200 milligrams. However, firecrackers mounted onto a rocket stick, or other aerial firework devices, such as rockets, Roman candles, and the larger version of M-80s (M-1000, etc.), may still have significantly more, depending on device and classification, and can be legally purchased by any American civilian citizen, except where prohibited by state law.

A person with a federal explosives license, issued by the ATF, may be allowed to purchase M-80s. Federal and state officials sometimes distribute them to farmers to scare away wildlife damaging their crops.

==== False advertising of modern firecrackers as M-80s ====
Many firecrackers sold legally in the United States to consumers have names and appearances intended to mimic the "M-80", such as for example "M-80 Firecracker", "M-8000", or "M-##" (where ## is a number). Those differ significantly from the actual "M-80" as they are subject to the regulations with regard to the sale of explosives and fireworks to the general public. These firecrackers most commonly have a small capsule with up to 50 milligrams of powder (30 milligrams is most common), in contrast with the 5200 milligrams (5.2 g) that real M-80s contain, and a fuse in it. Surrounding the capsule is plaster or a similar material, and finally a red tube and two plastic endcaps. Because of the size of these firecrackers, buyers are occasionally deceived into thinking that the entire tube is full. Also the fuse, at times, protrudes from the ends of these firecrackers, as opposed to the middle of the tube in real M-80s. Genuine M-80s have paper endcaps, and contain slightly more powder.

Contrary to urban legend, an M-80 that contains 3,000 mg of powder is not equivalent to a quarter-stick of dynamite. Dynamite generally contains a stable nitroglycerin-based high explosive, whereas M-80s or any other kind of firecracker contain a low explosive powder, like flash powder or black powder.

== Accidents ==
Cases of documented injuries and accidents accompanied civilian M-80 use during the 1950s and 1960s, and still occur because M-80s are still produced and sold to the public. There have been documented cases of users losing their fingers or hands. On July 8, 1976, during a Kiss concert at Richmond Coliseum, a fan threw an M-80 onto the stage, leaving drummer Peter Criss with partial hearing loss for the remainder of the night.

On October 9, 1977, during an Aerosmith concert at Philadelphia's Spectrum arena, a fan threw an M-80 firework that injured singer Steven Tyler's cornea, and lead guitarist Joe Perry's hand. The band stopped touring for a month while the two recovered.

On May 24, 1983, a truck trailer being used as a clandestine fireworks factory manufacturing M-80 fireworks exploded outside of Rowesville, South Carolina, killing two, injuring five, and damaging houses up to two and a half miles away. Three days later an explosion at a clandestine fireworks factory producing M-80 and M-100 fireworks near Benton, Tennessee, killed eleven, injured one, and inflicted damage within a radius of several miles. The operation was by far the largest-known illegal fireworks operation, and the initial blast was heard as far away as 20 miles (32 km) from the site. Both operations were connected to a multi-state illegal fireworks distribution and production ring, and multiple people were eventually sent to prison for their involvement in both incidents.

The 1986 San Francisco fireworks disaster occurred on April 5 of that year when an illegal machine making M-80s failed, resulting in widespread destruction of a city block, killing at least 8 people, and devastating 125 small businesses.

On July 5, 1990, fourteen-year-old Angar Hussan died at the Beth Israel Medical Center in New York City, a day after he had been struck in the throat by metal shards from an exploding steel garbage can while watching M-80 firecrackers being set off at a Fourth of July block party sponsored by the Hells Angels Motorcycle Club outside the club's headquarters in Manhattan's East Village. Three other bystanders were injured, two seriously. Hells Angels members Anthony Morabito and John Tannuzzo were charged with second-degree murder in Hussan's death on October 22. The motorcycle club as a corporation also was indicted on the charges. Of the two men charged with murder, one was convicted of criminally negligent homicide, and the case against the other was dismissed.

On July 1, 2019, ABC News reported that a nine-year-old girl was critically injured after handling what was suspected to be an M-80.

On July 4, 2025, a hip-hop artist named 4XTRA posted a video of him holding M80s to his Instagram account where he can be heard jokingly insinuating that he is "going to blow someone up" with these. He ended up losing part of his right hand to an accident after lighting up two M80s for the 4th of July fireworks celebration.

== See also ==
- Fireworks policy of the United States
