= Firecracker =

Small explosive meant to produce noise

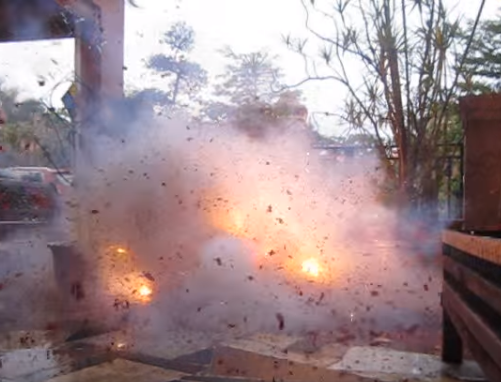
Chinese firecracker roll being set off

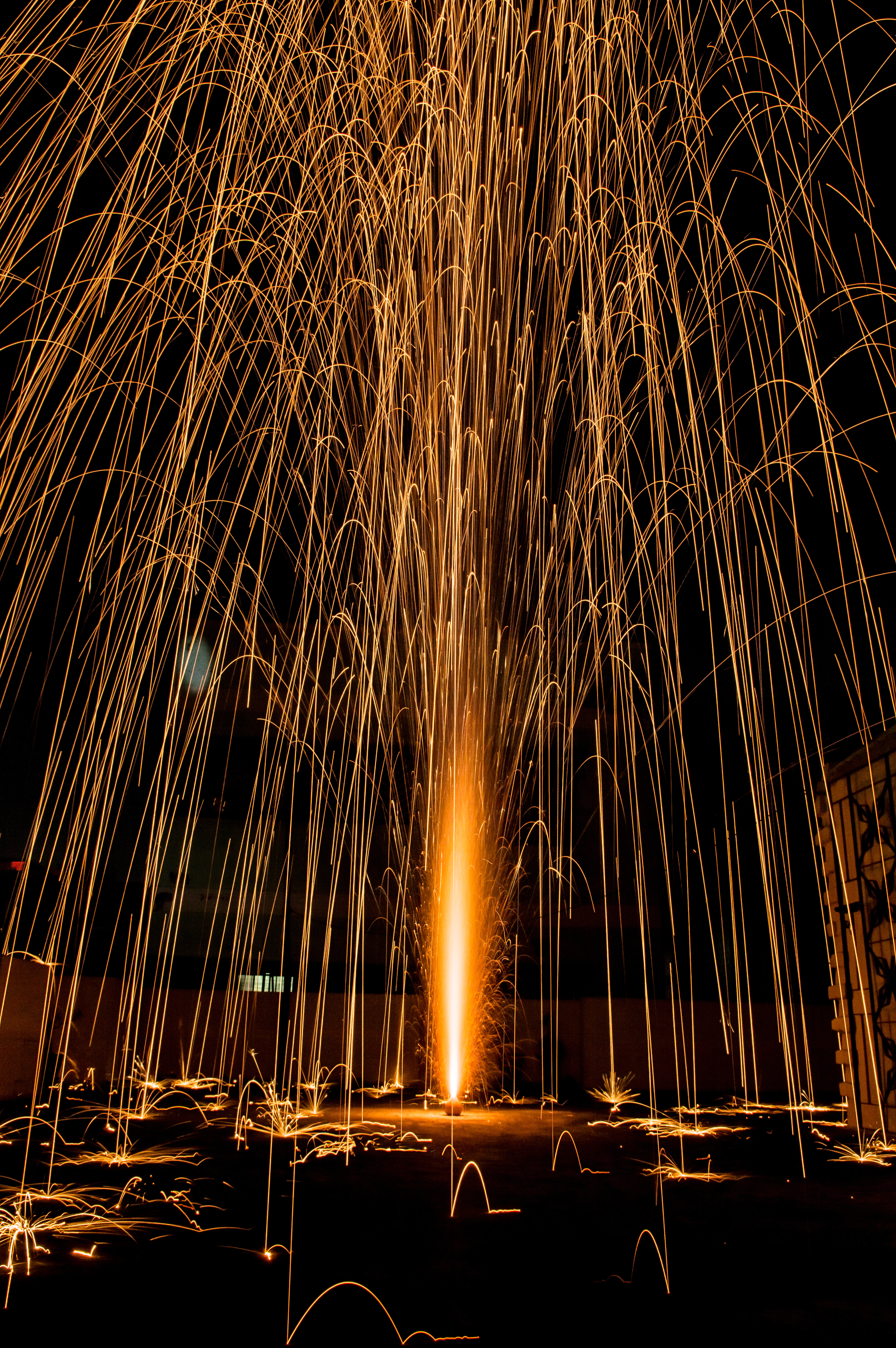
Large flower cracker set off at night

Firecrackers set off in Sibu, Pitaki, to celebrate Chinese New Year

A firecracker (cracker, noise maker, banger, petard) is a small explosive device primarily designed to produce a large amount of noise, especially in the form of a loud bang, usually for celebration or entertainment; any visual effect is incidental to this goal. They have fuses, and are wrapped in a heavy paper casing to contain the explosive compound. Firecrackers, along with fireworks, originated in China.

== History ==
The predecessor of the firecracker was a type of heated bamboo, used as early as 200 BCE, that exploded when heated continuously. The Chinese name for firecrackers, baozhu (爆竹), literally means "exploding bamboo." After the invention of gunpowder, gunpowder firecrackers had a shape that resembled bamboo and produced a similar sound, so the name "exploding bamboo" was retained. In traditional Chinese culture, firecrackers were used to ward away spirits, and was later co-opted for military use.

== Firecrackers production and sales ==
=== Ingredients ===
Firecrackers are generally made of cardboard or plastic, with flash powder (a mixture of oxidizer and metallic fuel), cordite, smokeless powder, or black powder as the propellant. This is not always the case, however. Anything from match heads to kerosene and lighter fluid has been used successfully in making firecrackers. The key to loud firecrackers, however, although in part lying in the propellant substance, is pressure. The entire firecracker must be very tightly packed in order for it to work best. Flash powder, however, does not need to be packed tightly, and should not be.

=== Manufacturing ===
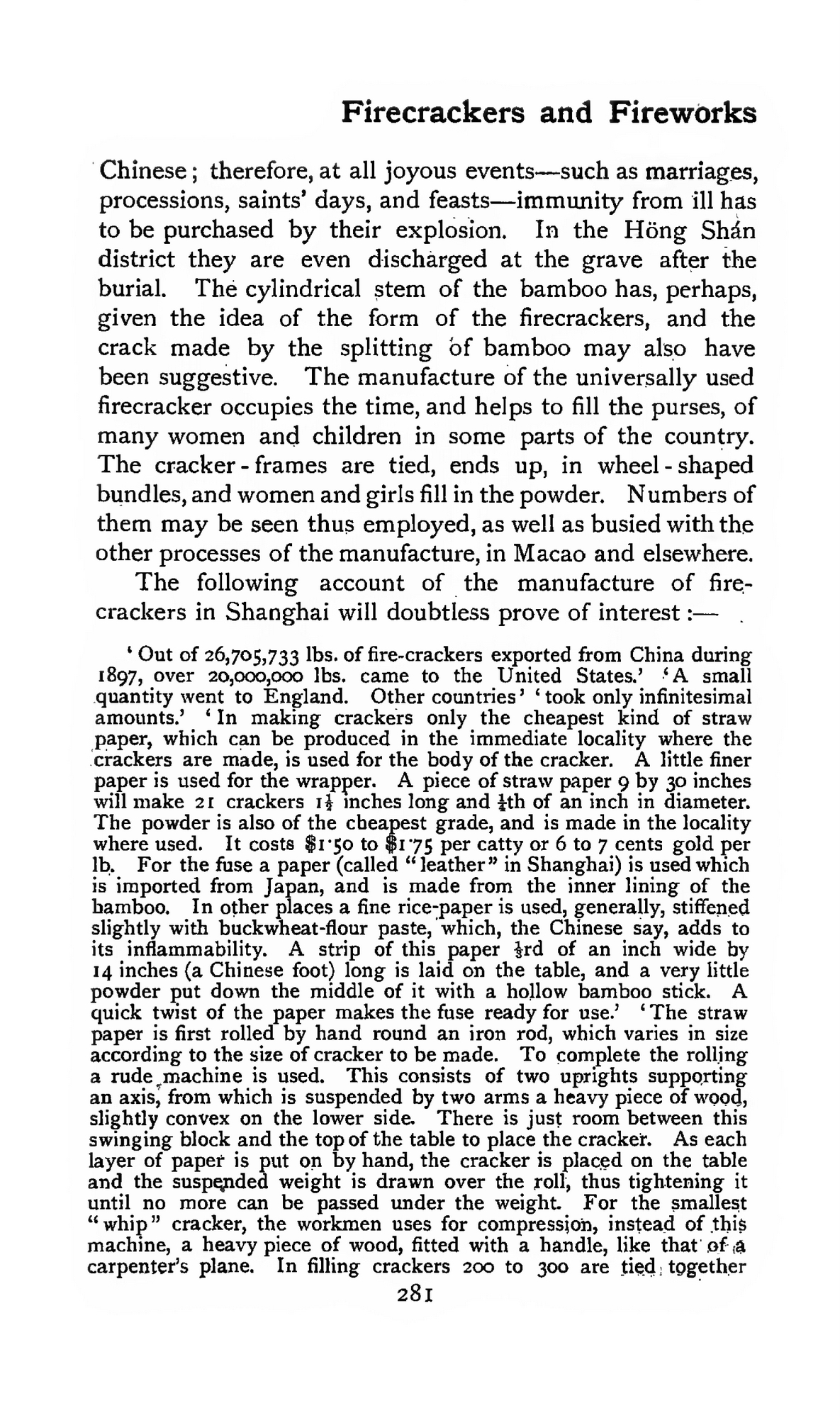
Dyer Ball on firecrackers

James Dyer Ball, in his book Things Chinese, has a detailed description about the process and material used for making firecrackers at the end of the 19th century. At that time, firecrackers were made by women and children workers, using straw paper to make the body of the firecracker, while the fuse was made of paper imported from Japan made from the inner lining of the bamboo plant, or rice paper, stiffened with buckwheat paste. The bamboo paper was cut into strips of 14 inches (360 mm) long and 1/3 inch (8.5 mm) wide, laid on a table; a string of gunpowder was placed at the center with a hollow tube, then twisted up to make a piece of fuse. The firecracker tubes were made from pieces of straw paper wrapped around iron rods of various diameters and then tightened with a special tool. 200 to 300 firecrackers were tied up in a bunch, then red clay was spread at the bottom of the bunch and forced into each end of the firecracker with a punch; gunpowder was poured in, then the other end was sealed with an awl by turning the tube inward, and a fuse inserted.

=== Green or environment friendly firecracker ===
After India's National Green Tribunal (NGT) enacted a ban on the sale and use of crackers on Diwali festival in 2020, the Council for Scientific and Industrial Research (CSIR) developed green crackers made from cleaner raw materials which reduce emissions by suppressing the production of dust; their emissions are 30% lower but are also of reduced loudness, at 110-125 decibels instead of the more than 160 decibels of traditional firecrackers. However, green crackers still contain harmful pollutants such as aluminium, barium, potassium nitrate and carbon.

=== Sales, packaging and branding ===
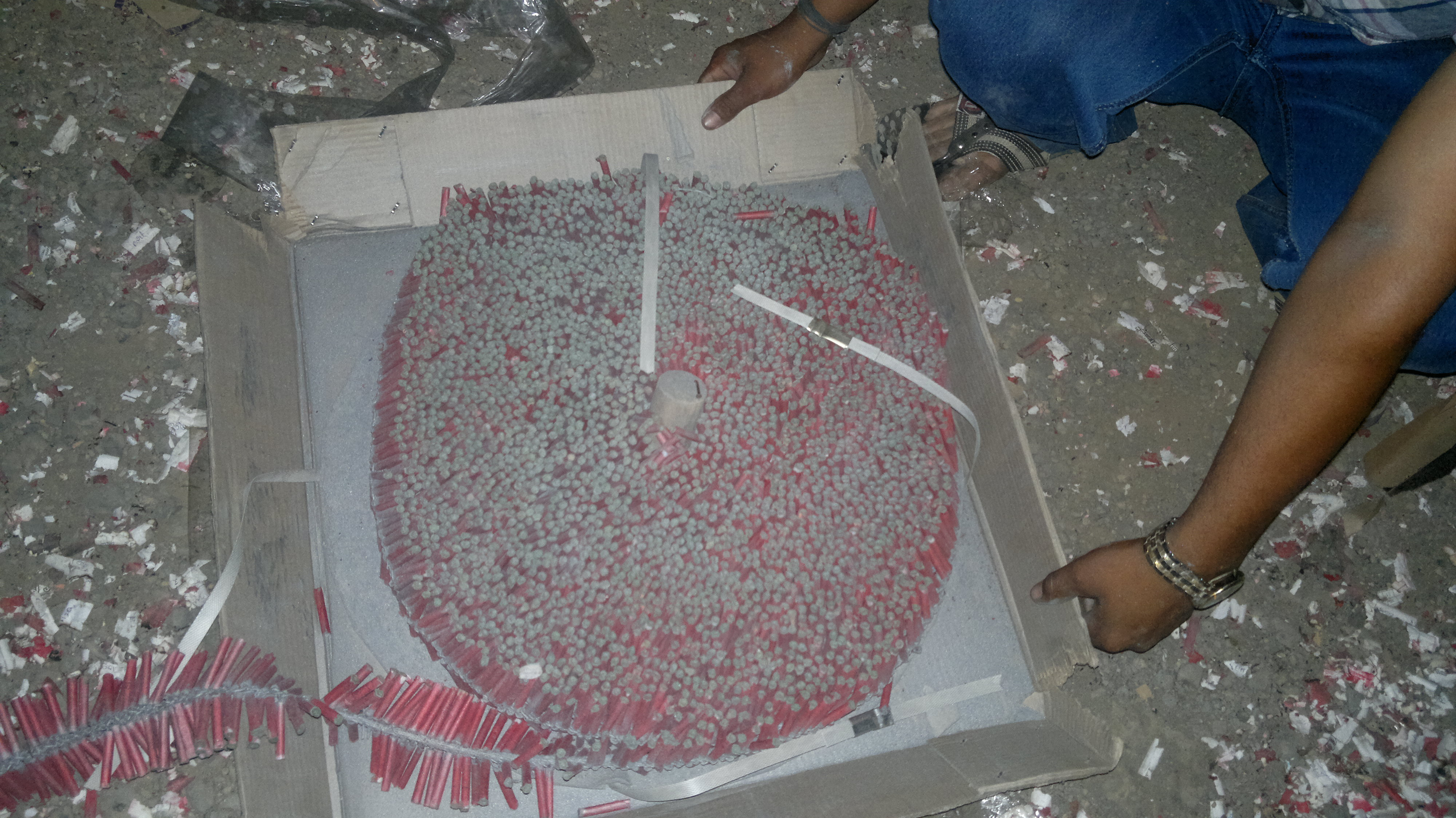
A firecracker roll containing 10,000 firecrackers

Early (pre-1920s) Chinese firecrackers (also known as "Mandarin firecrackers") were typically 1/2 to 2 inches (13 to 51 mm) long, and approximately 1/4 inch (6.4 mm) in diameter, and were charged with black powder. Mandarin crackers produced a less loud, duller thud compared to modern flash-light crackers (which utilize a different explosive known as flash powder). Mandarin crackers produced a dimmer, less brilliant flash when they exploded also. Individual Mandarin crackers were most often braided into "strings" of varying lengths, which, when ignited, exploded in rapid sequence. Generally, the strings (sometimes containing as many as several thousand crackers) would be hung from an overhead line before ignition. Most Mandarin crackers were colored all red and did not generally have designs or logos decorating their exterior surface (or "shell wraps"). Occasionally a few yellow and green colored Mandarin crackers were created and would be braided into the predominantly all-red strings to symbolize the emperor and the ruling class, while the numerous red crackers symbolized the common man.

Once flash powder, which produces a significantly sharper and brighter bang, replaced black powder as a firecracker's explosive charge (circa 1924), manufacturers began competing to gain loyalty of typical consumers (that is, mainly boys 8 to 16 years old). Thousands of brands were created during the flash-light cracker's heyday from the 1920s through the early 1970s. Only a small percentage of brands lasted more than a year or two. Collectors now seek the various labels from the era.

Until the mid-1980s, firecracker production was low-tech. They were handmade, beginning with rolling tubes. Once the firecracker tubes were rolled by hand (commonly from newspaper) and labelled, and then filled with powder, their ends were crimped and fuses inserted, all by hand. These finished firecrackers were usually braided into "strings" and sold in packs which came in many sizes, from the very small ("penny packs" containing as few as four to six firecrackers) to the most common size packs (containing 16 and 20 crackers per pack), to larger packs (containing 24, 30, 32, 40, 50, 60, 72, 90, 100, and 120 firecrackers), to huge "belts" and "rolls" (packages containing strings of several hundred to several thousand crackers—Phantom Fireworks sells rolls as large as 16,000 firecrackers). Firecracker packages were wrapped in colourful and translucent glassine paper, as well as clear cellophane, with glassine the most popular.

The final operation involved applying a branded label on each pack, then bundling finished packs into wholesale lots called "bricks" which contained an average of 80 packs each (varying according to the size of the packs being bundled; for example, packs of 32 crackers might have 40 packs per brick, compared to packs of 16 or 20 with 80 packs per brick).

== Usage ==
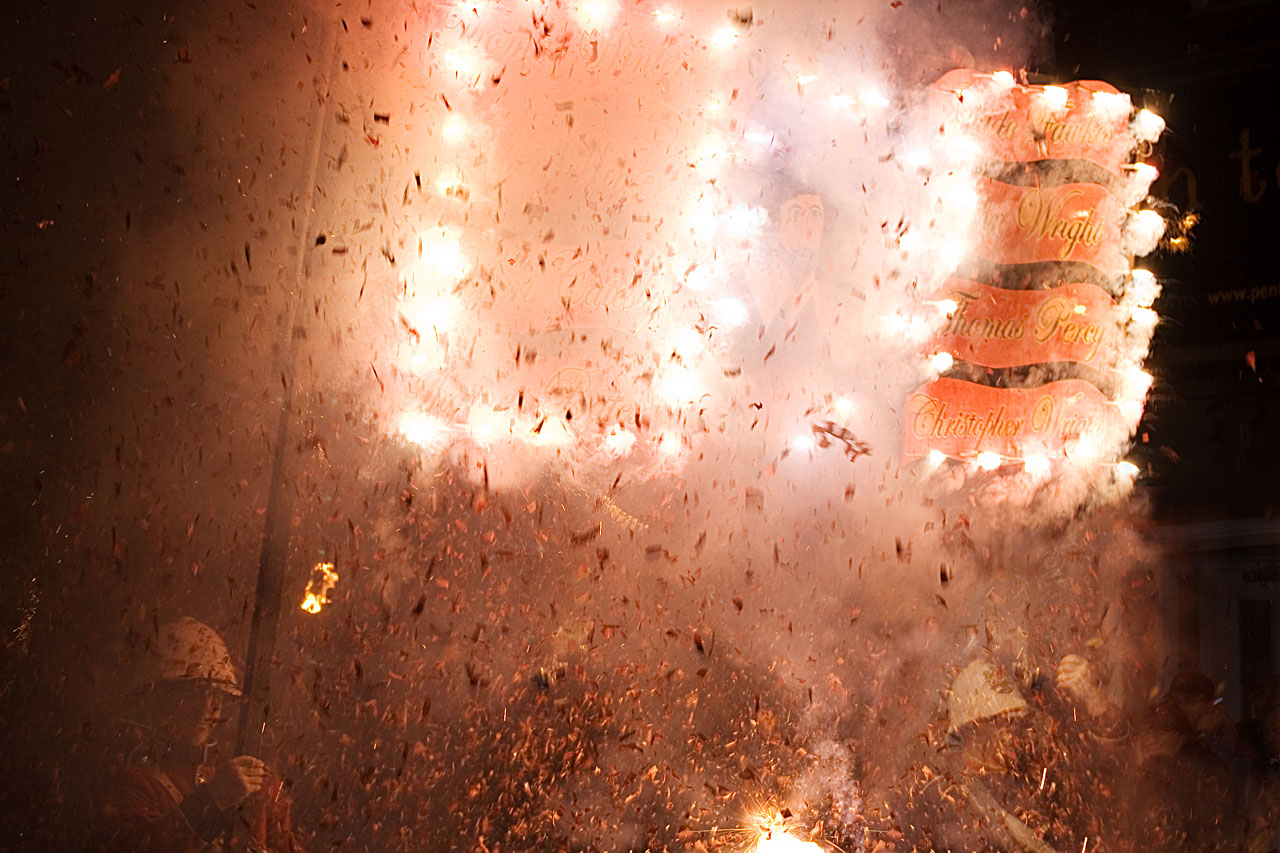
Two men dressed as colonial soldiers carry a banner, exploding firecrackers, commemorating Guy Fawkes and his co-conspirators as part of Lewes Bonfire Night celebrations.

=== Laws governing production, sales and usage of firecrackers ===
Firecrackers, as well as other types of explosives, are subject to various laws in many countries, although firecrackers themselves are not usually considered illegal contraband material. It is usually the manufacture, sale, storage, and use of firecrackers that are subject to laws, including safety requirements for manufacture, the requirement of a permit to sell or store, or restrictions on the use of firecrackers.

=== Celebrations ===
Firecrackers are commonly used in celebration of holidays or festivals, such as Halloween, Independence Day (also known as the Fourth of July) in the United States, Diwali in India, Eid al-Fitr in Southeast Asia, Tihar in Nepal, Day of Ashura in Morocco, Guy Fawkes Night or Bonfire Night in the United Kingdom, Halloween in Ireland, Bastille Day in France, Spanish Fallas, in almost every cultural festival of Sri Lanka (e.g. Sri Lankan New Year), New Year's Eve and New Year's Day, and in the celebration of Chinese New Year by Chinese communities around the world.

== Usage and legal status by country ==
The use of firecrackers, although a traditional part of the celebration, has over the years led to many injuries and deaths. There have been incidents every year of users being blinded, losing body parts, or suffering other injuries, especially during festivities that customarily involve firecrackers such as Chinese New Year season. Hence, many governments and authorities have enacted laws completely banning the sale or use of firecrackers, or banning the use of firecrackers in the street, primarily because of safety or environmental reasons.

These rules also require a permit from the local government, as well as any relevant local bodies such as maritime or aviation authorities (as relevant to the types of firecrackers being used) and hospitals, schools, etc., within a certain range.

=== Australia ===
In most states and territories, firecrackers are illegal without a permit and part of a display by a licensed pyrotechnician. Tasmania, ACT and Northern Territory allow consumer use with a permit (dependent on calendar date). Northern Territory is the only part of Australia where a consumer does not require a permit, but this only applies on 1 July for Territory Day.

=== Canada ===
Firecrackers are not authorized under the Explosives Act, thus making importation, possession, transportation, storage, or manufacturing illegal in Canada.

=== Croatia ===
The use of firecrackers is regulated by the Law on Explosive Substances and the Production and Trading of Weapons (Croatian: Zakon o eksplozivnim tvarima te proizvodnji i prometu oružja). According to the Law, firecrackers (including other pyrotechnic articles) are divided into three classes: Class 1 Pyrotechnics - pyrotechnic articles for fireworks which represent a very low risk, have negligible noise level and are intended for use in restricted areas, including fireworks intended for use within residential buildings; Class 2 and 3 Pyrotechnics - pyrotechnic articles for fireworks which represent low to medium risk, have medium to high noise level and are intended for outdoor use in restricted areas and large open areas. Class 1 Pyrotechnics can be sold all year round to people over the age of 14 in general stores and newsstands, while Class 2 and 3 Pyrotechnics can only be sold between 15 December and 1 January each year at gun shops and stores with special permits to the people over the age of 14 (class 2) or over the age of 18 (class 3). Use of Class 2 and 3 Pyrotechnics is allowed only in the period between 27 December and 1 January. Each year since 1993, between 15 December and 8 January, the police carries out the "Peace and good" action with the aim of prevention of people from getting hurt and violating public order. The penalties for unauthorized use of pyrotechnic articles range between 1,000 and 15,000 kunas (€135 - €2,035) for people, and between 10,000 and 80,000 kunas (€1,355 - €10,850) for companies. For a legal guardian of a child under the age of 14 who have used pyrotechnic articles, fine ranges between 1,000 and 3,000 kunas (€135 - €405).

=== China ===
As of 2008, most urban areas in mainland China permit firecrackers. In the first three days of the traditional New Year, it is a tradition that people compete with each other by playing with firecrackers. However, many urban areas banned them in the 1990s. For example, they were banned in Beijing's urban districts from 1993 to 2005. Since the ban was lifted, the firecracker barrage has been tremendous. An unusual feature is that many residents in major cities look down on street-level fireworks from their tower blocks. Bans are rare in rural areas.

=== Czech Republic ===
Firecrackers are legal in the Czech Republic. They can have up to 5g of flash powder and can be bought by anyone older than 21 years. For stronger firecrackers (up to 100g) a permit is required.

=== Germany ===
Fireworks are classified. Some fireworks are restricted to adults (18 years), may be sold to private persons only on three days before New Year's Eve and may be used only on New Year's Eve or New Year (special permits can be obtained to use these on other days of the year). Other fireworks have no such restrictions, however, they are not recommended for children below 12 years and guidance by adults is advised. Certain fireworks are available only to professionals.

=== Finland ===
Firecrackers sold to consumers are restricted to 0.95 grams of black powder. The ban on larger firecrackers went into effect in 1996. Before, mid-size kiinanpommi or kiinari ("Chinese bomb") and tykinlaukaus and large tykäri ("artillery shot") had become cheap and common products that were often used by children after the celebration, leading to accidents.

=== Hong Kong ===
Firecrackers and fireworks were banned in Hong Kong for security reasons in 1967, as a result of many IED attacks in the 1967 Leftist Riot. However, the government stages a fireworks display in Victoria Harbour for New Year countdown and the second day of the Chinese New Year.

=== Hungary ===
Firecrackers are banned in Hungary since 2005. Other types of consumer fireworks are only allowed to be sold and used on New Year's Eve. Many people smuggle firecrackers from Slovakia, where they are legal.

=== India ===
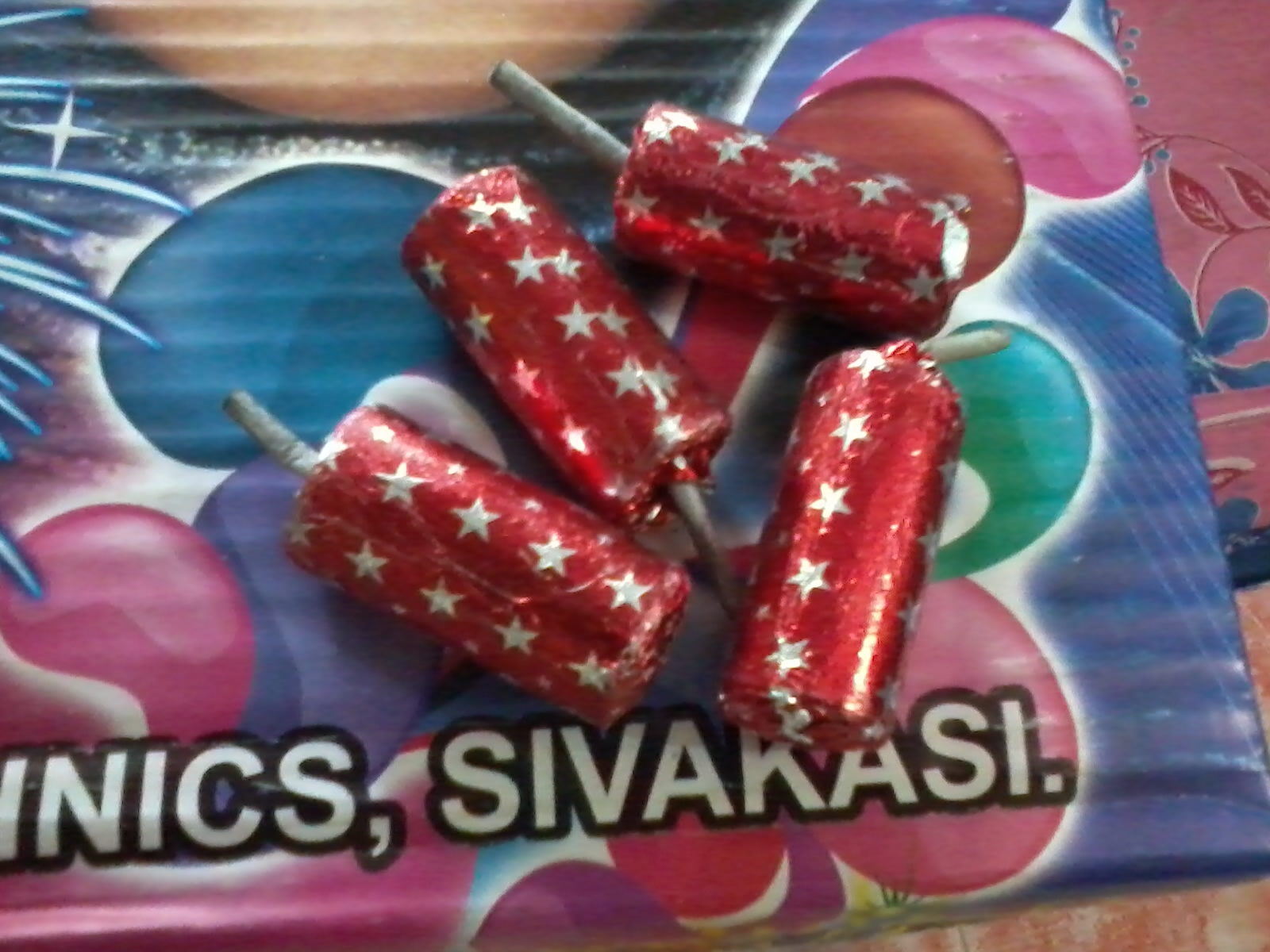
Bullet Bomb Firecracker

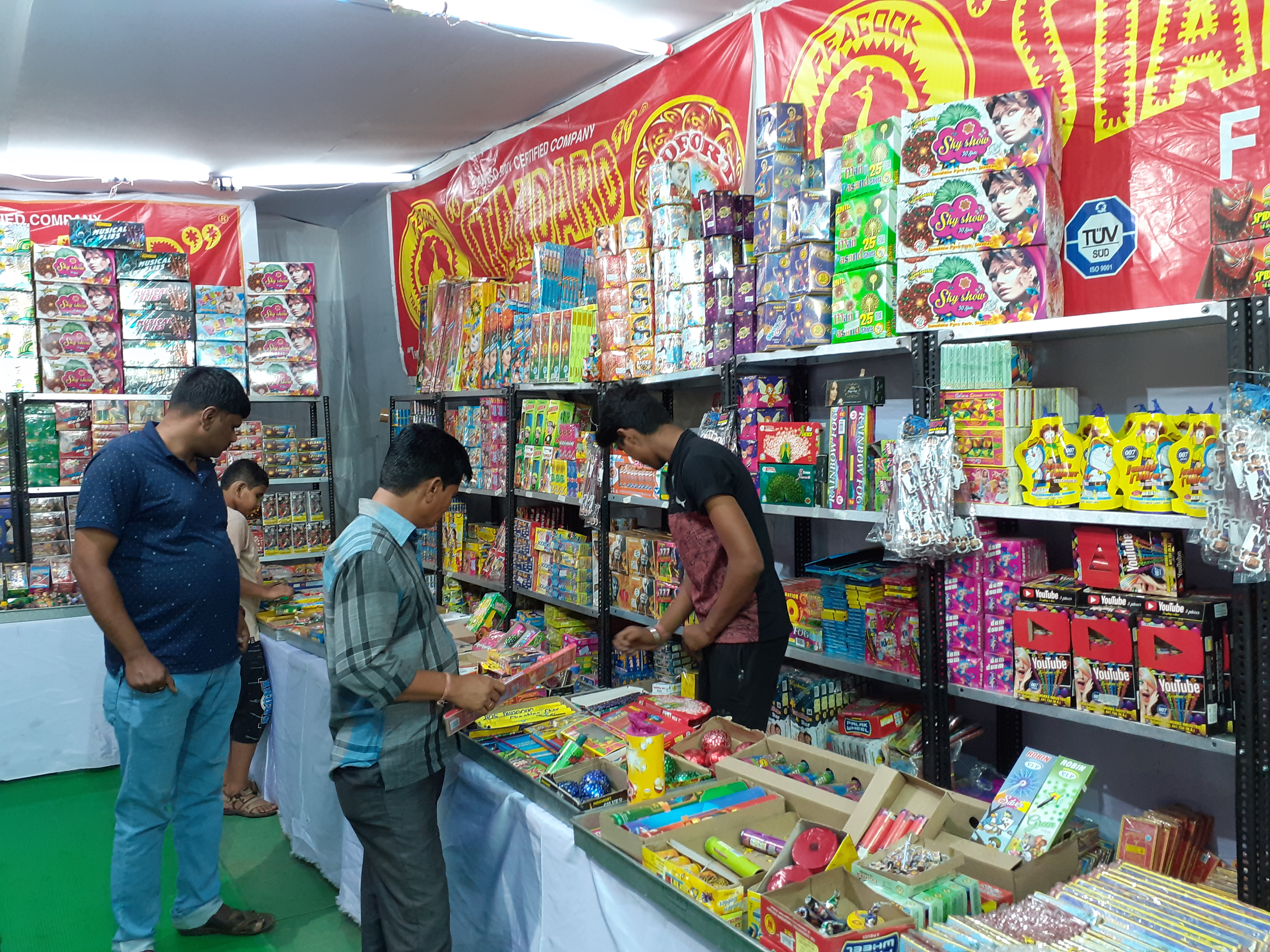
Firecracker shop in Nagpur during Diwali

Firecrackers are easily available in India and are used to mark a celebratory event. They are legal, and anyone 18 and over can buy them without a licence.

Vijayadashami and Diwali fireworks are a family event in many parts of India. People light up fireworks near their homes and in streets. Additionally, cities and communities have community fireworks.

This custom may have begun on the Indian subcontinent after 1400 CE when gunpowder started being utilised in Indian warfare.

India's first fireworks factory was established in Calcutta during the 19th century.

In October and November, farmers from Punjab and Haryana burn agricultural waste and the weather tends not to be windy, so Delhi's air pollution usually increases, which has been a major environmental problem in recent years. Firecrackers for the Diwali holiday can worsen this pollution. In October 2017, the Supreme Court banned firecrackers in Delhi, as a result of which the industry said it faced losses of Rs 1,000-crore and consequently layoffs.

After India's National Green Tribunal (NGT) ordered a ban in the NCR region on the sale and use of crackers in 2020, the Council for Scientific and Industrial Research (CSIR) developed "green crackers" that used less polluting raw materials. Several states in India have either banned firecrackers or limited the time, noise level and type (mandatory use of less polluting firecrackers) that can be used. Nonetheless, many firecrackers were used to celebrate the Vijayadashami and Diwali holidays in 2020, immediately after which Delhi's air pollution was over 9 times the level that the World Health Organization considers safe.

Aaratrika Bhaumik writing for the website "livelaw.in" mentions the ban put in place by the Calcutta High Court on firecrackers (green firecrackers included) throughout the state of West Bengal for the 2021 Vijayadashami and Diwali festivities. The ban extends to all remaining festivals in the year, such as, Chhath Puja, Kali Puja, Guru Nanak Jayanti, Christmas and New Year's.

=== Indonesia ===
As of 2025, firecrackers and fireworks are generally forbidden imports. Many celebrations of Chinese New Year (or Imlek) have been restricted as well, especially in areas with significant non-Chinese populations, due to concerns about conflict. However, there are some exceptions. The usage of firecrackers is legal in some metropolitan areas such as Jakarta, where the degree of racial and cultural tolerance is higher. Though there are concerns about the noise in residential areas. The firecracker has also been compared to a symbol of casting out evil spirits during the Chinese New Year.

=== Ireland ===
Fireworks and firecrackers are not permitted in the Republic of Ireland; however, many people smuggle them from Northern Ireland, where they are legal. They are most common around Halloween. Irish anti-firecracker laws are considered among the strictest in the world, equal to Chile's.

=== Malaysia ===
Private citizens are banned from using fireworks in the Minor Offences Act 1955 and Explosives Act 1957. However, the illegal setting of fireworks and firecrackers are rarely enforced as they are tolerated during festive seasons. In addition, fireworks are readily available in the community.

The government only allows fireworks for public events, and some authorised events held by businesses and other groups with a permit.

=== New Zealand ===
Firecrackers have been banned in New Zealand since 1994.

=== Norway ===
The government of Norway banned the sale of rockets to individuals in early 2009, while allowing rockets to continue to be used in firework displays managed by licensed professionals. Other types of fireworks can still be sold.

=== Philippines ===
Fireworks and firecrackers are widely available throughout the Philippines and both Republic Act 7183 and Executive Order 28 were enacted to regulate and to control the sale, distribution, manufacture and use of firecrackers for public safety. Under Republic Act 7183, there are certain firecrackers that are legal such as Judas' belt and the prohibition of a certain firecracker and pyrotechnic devices shall be determined by the Director-General of the Philippine National Police. Although, there are cities in the Philippines banning all kinds of firecrackers and those cities are Muntinlupa (since 2013), Olongapo (since 2008) and Davao City (since 2001). Injuries involving the use or ingestion of "Piccolo" sticks account for the majority of firecracker-related incidents in the country. However, in December 2020, firecrackers were banned in some areas of Metro Manila to prevent injuries and avoid mass gatherings in the region due to the COVID-19 pandemic. For example, Mayor Joy Belmonte of Quezon City said that fireworks and firecracker use is strictly prohibited in basketball courts, streets and public spaces, and can only be used in designated firecracker zones. Some provinces and municipalities outside of Metro Manila also imposed a firecracker ban to make sure that minimum health protocols will be observed during the new year celebration.

=== Singapore ===
A partial ban on firecrackers was imposed in March 1970 after a fire killed six people and injured 68. This was extended to a total ban in August 1972, after an explosion that killed two people. and an attack on two police officers attempting to stop a group from letting off firecrackers in February 1972. Since, in 2003, the government allowed firecrackers to be set off during the festive season, but only by government approved and appointed personnel. As such, private individuals are still prohibited from setting off fireworks and firecrackers. At the Chinese New Year light-up in Chinatown, at the stroke of midnight on the first day of the Lunar New Year, firecrackers are set off under controlled conditions by the Singapore Tourism Board. Other occasions where firecrackers are allowed to be set off are determined by the tourism board or other government organisations. Private sale and importation of fireworks and firecrackers is prohibited.

=== Sweden ===
Only rocket-type fireworks and small firecrackers are currently allowed in Sweden. The ban of firecrackers was effectuated by the EU Parliament and Swedish government effective 1 December 2001, but in 2006 the EU Parliament changed the laws, allowing smaller types of firecrackers. By 2008, the law had to be in effect in all EU member countries, including Sweden.

=== Taiwan ===
Firecrackers have been banned in urban areas of Taiwan since 2008, but are still allowed in rural areas.

=== United Kingdom ===
In 1997, firecrackers became illegal, but most other consumer fireworks are legal.

=== United States ===
According to Reader's Digest, as of June 2023 firecrackers are legal in every US state besides Massachusetts, though the exact types allowed vary.

In 2007, New York City lifted its decade-old ban on firecrackers, allowing a display of 300,000 firecrackers to be set off in Chinatown's Chatham Square. Under the supervision of the fire and police departments, Los Angeles regularly lights firecrackers every New Year's Eve, mostly at temples and the shrines of benevolent associations. The San Francisco Chinese New Year Parade, the largest outside China, is accompanied by numerous firecrackers, both officially sanctioned and illicit.

=== Vietnam ===
In 1994, the Government of Vietnam decided to ban firecrackers nationwide. Only fireworks displays produced and performed by the government are permitted.

== See also ==
- M-80 (explosive) – Pyrotechnic device
- Quarter stick – Pyrotechnic device
- Salute (pyrotechnics) – Firework designed to make a loud bang
- Squib – Small explosive device
- Superstring (fireworks)
- Sutli bomb – Indian firecracker
- Cherry bomb – Small spherical firework
