= Photoflash bomb =

Obsolete form of explosive illumination for nocturnal battlefield photography

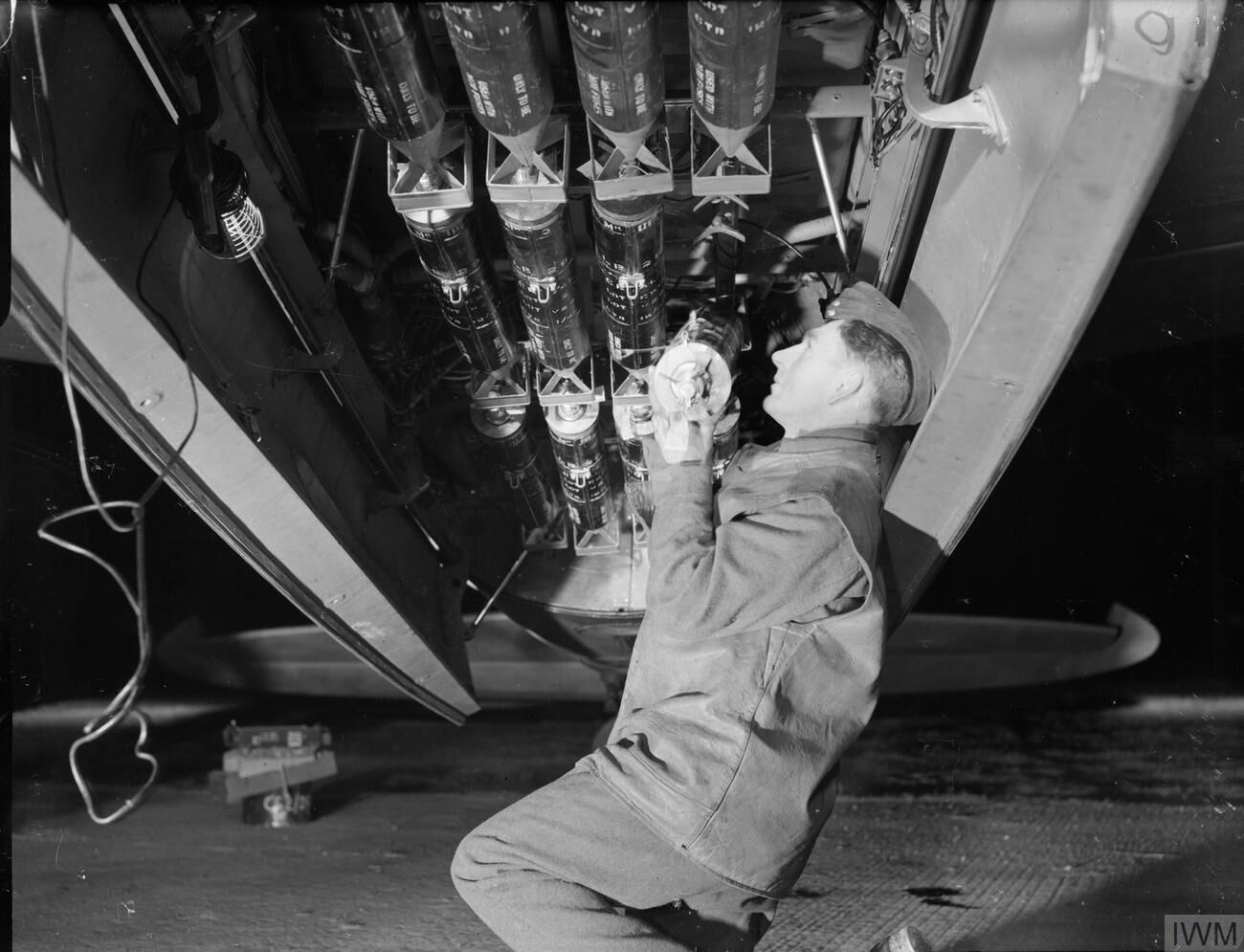
19-pound (8.6 kg) Flashbombs are loaded into a photo-reconnaissance De Havilland Mosquito at Melsbroek, Belgium. c.1944

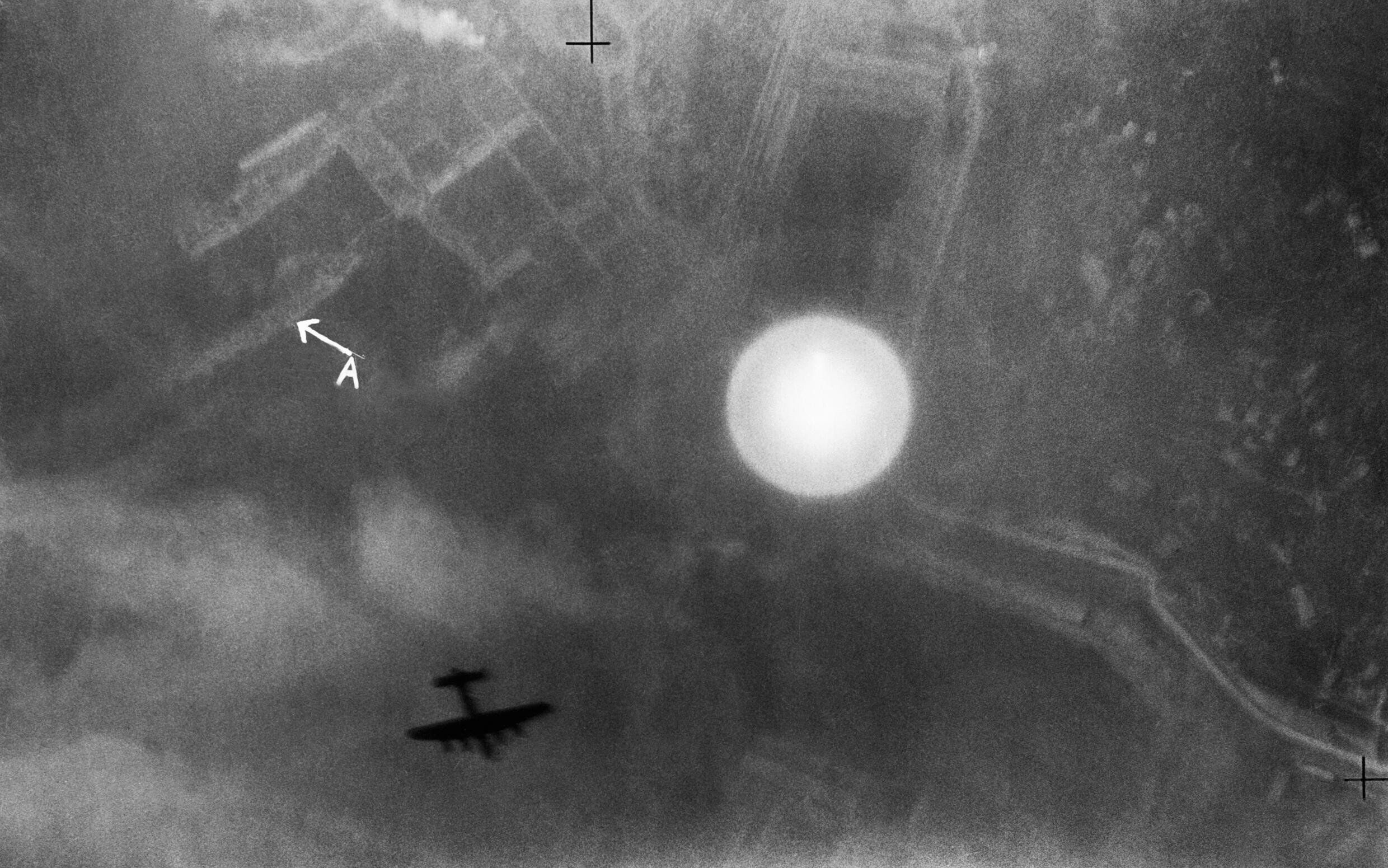
A photoflash bomb detonates over La Spezia during an air-raid on the night of 13-14 April 1943. It has illuminated the town's dockyard and a berthed battleship (marked with an 'A'). The silhouette of one of the attacking Avro Lancaster bombers can be seen. Note the explosive shockwave faintly visible around the flash.

A photoflash bomb, or flash bomb, is explosive ordnance dropped by aircraft, usually military surveillance aircraft, designed to detonate above ground to create an extremely bright flash of light. These bombs, which are capable of producing light at an intensity of up to hundreds of millions of candlepower, assist surveillance aircraft in taking nighttime aerial photos without the need to fly low to the ground which would make them vulnerable to possible enemy detection. Due to the advent of better nighttime optics, satellite imagery, and stealth aircraft, these bombs are no longer used by the military.

== Construction ==
There were several models of photoflash bombs, but most had a similar construction and makeup. For example, the M23A1 was constructed of a cardboard tube, capped on both ends with metal "plugs." The tube was then filled with a flash powder "charge" and a fuse. The fuse would be attached to the hanging wire using a standard friction wire, which would ignite the flash powder after a specified delay. In this specific model of ordnance, the flash would last approximately 1/5th of a second after detonation.

== Recent events ==
On 19 July 2015, a World War II-era M122 (45 kg or 100 lb) photoflash bomb washed ashore at St. Pete Beach, Florida, U.S. This led authorities to evacuate the beach and several nearby homes. An Explosive Ordnance Disposal team from MacDill Air Force Base responded to the scene and detonated the device.

== See also ==
- Flare
