= Sutli bomb =

Indian firecracker

Sutli bomb, also known as Atom Bomb or Hydro-bomb, due to its notorious noise, is an Indian firecracker popular during the festival of Diwali and other celebrations. It is the noisiest firecracker, exceeding the permissible sound barrier of 145 decibels (dB).

== About ==
Sutli bomb is made with jute twine (sutli) that is green in color and has a red band that has manufacturer's name. The twine is wrapped around the explosive component and results in producing a powerful sound. What produces this sound is the tight packaging of gunpowder inside. When the gunpowder is heated, lots of gases (carbon dioxide, carbon monoxide, oxides of sulphur) and the noise comes due to these gas pressure tearing through the tight packaging.

== Banned ==
It is banned by many governments under Arms Act, because of the noise level it produces that is almost double the permissible level of 75 decibels.
