= Superstring (fireworks) =

Large bundle of firecrackers

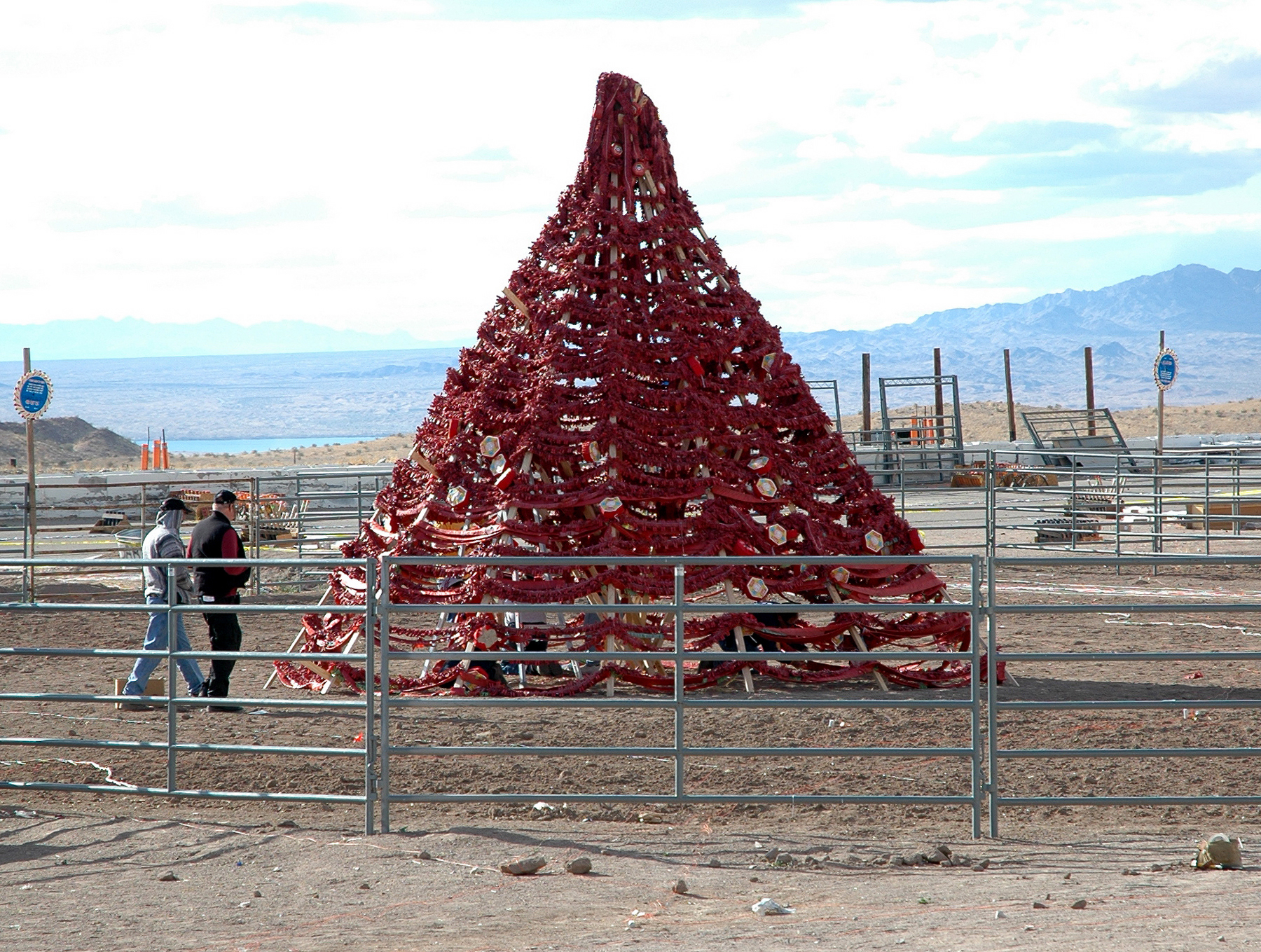
1,000,000-cracker "teepee" built at Western Winter Blast in 2006

A superstring, also known as a cracker wall, is a name commonly given to an immense bundle of firecrackers, usually numbering in the hundreds of thousands, which are often a central fixture at fireworks conventions. Although large compound strings of firecrackers have been constructed since firecrackers were invented, the superstring was greatly popularized by the Pyrotechnics Guild International, whose yearly convention often features a huge superstring consisting of well over a million firecrackers. Superstrings are usually constructed over a rudimentary wooden or metallic structure as a sort of curtain wall.

At the 1976 P.G.I. (Pyrotechnic Guild International) Convention in Grand Junction, Colorado, member Robert (Rob) Berk came up with the idea of connecting a series of firecracker strings together in order to make a "superstring". Fellow members Lino Nivolo, Rudy Schwerdt, and Bob Luke collaborated in the construction. The final count of this first attempt was approximately 2,000 firecrackers. The excitement of building this string increased the following year at the annual convention in St. Croix Falls, Wisconsin when the superstring exceeded the hundred-thousand mark. To add to the excitement, auctioneer Rob Berk pounded the gavel as Lou Czaplewski paid $25 for the right to light it. Over the years, the superstring has increased in size and the amount paid to light it has exceeded $4,000.

The largest superstring ever constructed was built by the Pyrotechnics Guild International in 2006. It was over 1,000 feet long and contained 10,500,000 firecrackers. It was ignited on August 11 and burned for about three minutes. It was ignited from both ends simultaneously and burned towards the center, which was raised into the air on a crane.
