= 1986 San Francisco fireworks disaster =

1986 explosion and fire in San Francisco

Coordinates: 37.7262°N 122.3796°W

The 1986 San Francisco fireworks disaster took place on April 5, when a massive explosion and fire devastated a city block in the Bayview district of San Francisco. The explosion occurred in the three-story Bayview Building at 1070 Revere Avenue, which housed about 125 light industrial and crafts businesses.

At least eight people were killed and another 20 were injured. Within days, investigators learned that the explosion had occurred in a clandestine fireworks factory.

Damage was estimated at $10 million, and over a hundred small businesses were affected. The archives of Rip Off Press, including a few hundred thousand comics, books and posters, were burned. Other businesses destroyed included artist studios, a distribution center for the New York Times, a boat shop and a cabinet shop.

A 28-year-old man, Thomas C. Cuyos, was killed in the explosion, and investigators said that he was the operator of the illegal fireworks production facility. In 1985, Cuyos had founded Infinite Technology Inc. as a fireworks manufacturer, with headquarters outside San Francisco. Cuyos and his associates had told the owners of the Bayview Bullding that they ran a computer paper company. Nolan Florita, 26 years old, had been helping Cuyos, and was also presumed killed.

On April 17, agents from the Bureau of Alcohol, Tobacco and Firearms arrested three people who were charged with conspiracy in the operation of the fireworks factory. One of those arrested confirmed that Cuyos had built a machine to mass-produce M-80s. Two of those arrested were later convicted, and the third was acquitted.

Lawsuits lasted for four years. A settlement resulted in 125 plaintiffs sharing $9 million.

In 2006, twenty years after the explosion, a memorial service honoring the victims was held at the San Francisco Zen Center.
