= Cherry bomb =

Type of firework

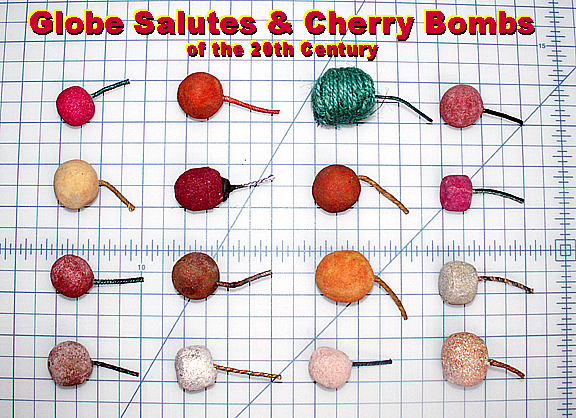
Some of the most common cherry bombs and globe salutes commercially available in the United States. Picture scale: the blue lines in the background are ½-inch apart. From top left: Kent Cherry Flash Salute, c. 1958; Havre de Grace Cherry Bomb (aka Arrow Brand), c. 1946; Peacock Standard Globe Cracker Bomb (India Export), c. 1995; United Cherry Salute, c. 1964; Row two from left: J.L. Morse Globe Salute, c. 1932; Po Sing Phantom Bomb, c. 1977; National Globe Salute, c. 1937; New Jersey Fireworks Cherry Bomb Salute, c. 1962; Row three: Miller Cherry Bomb, c. 1958; United Globe Salute, c. 1934; Victory Globe Salute, c. 1931; Triumph Colored Marble Flash Salute, c. 1938; Bottom row: United Cherry Salute, c. 1950; Victory Globe Flash Salute, c. 1937; Rozzi Cherry Salute (very faded), c. 1951; Unexcelled Cherry Salute, c. 1934

A cherry bomb (also known as a globe salute or kraft salute) is an approximately spherical exploding firework, roughly resembling a cherry in size and shape (with the fuse resembling the cherry's stem). Cherry bombs range in size from three-quarters to one and a half inches (1.9 to 3.8 cm) in diameter.

== Composition ==
A typical cherry bomb contains a core of explosive composition (e.g., flash powder or, less commonly, black powder) which is generally encapsulated inside two nested paper cups, typically of the type used to plug the ends of an M-80, which is in turn most commonly surrounded by a layer (approx. one-quarter inch thick) of sawdust infused with a mild adhesive (usually sodium silicate). An ignition fuse is inserted into a hole drilled into the hardened sawdust sphere, all the way down to reach the explosive composition. The fuse extends outside the sphere approximately one to one and a half inches. Once the fuse is ignited, it takes about three to four and a half seconds to reach the explosive composition and initiate explosion of the firework.

The color of the salute's exterior varies, depending on the manufacturer and the time period during which the salute was produced. Early on, in the late-1920s and 1930s, globe salutes had fuses which were tan, red or striped and multi-colored, and their body color varied, ranging from brown and tan to silver and red, and some were even decorated with multi-colored confetti. However, by the 1940s the most common color of the spherical salutes being marketed was a deep pink to red, with a green fuse, which is when the names cherry salute and cherry bomb entered popular use.

== Legal status ==
=== United States ===
Original spherical salutes were powerful enough to be a safety concern. They were banned in the United States in 1966 by the federal Child Safety Act of 1966. Historically, globe salutes and cherry bombs were made in two halves. One half was filled with powder and the other half was glued in place on top of it, and the whole globe was covered with glue-coated string or sawdust. This left an air-gap which created a louder bang when the case ruptured. Another source which says they were originally charged with 5 to 10 times more explosive composition than was used in a standard one-and-a-half-inch (38 mm) paper firecracker. After the enactment of the Child Safety Act of 1966, all "consumer fireworks" (those available to individuals), such as silver tube salutes, cherry bombs and M-80s, were banned, and from then on, no cherry bomb or salute could contain more than 50 milligrams of powder mixture, about 5% of the original amount. The 50 mg cherry bomb law was passed in 1977.

Cherry bombs with the original potency (>50 mg of powder) are considered explosive devices in the United States and possession, manufacture, or sale is illegal for individuals, unless they have a license or permit issued by the Bureau of Alcohol, Tobacco, Firearms and Explosives.

== See also ==
- Salute (pyrotechnics)
- M-80
