= Salute (pyrotechnics) =

Firework designed to make a loud bang

In pyrotechnics a salute is a device primarily designed to make a loud report (bang), rather than have a visual effect, although most salutes also have a bright flash. They most commonly consist of a 70:30 mixture of potassium perchlorate and dark aluminium powder and may have titanium added for a cloud of sparks (titanium salute). The salute may be fired on the ground (ground salute) or launched from a mortar as a shell (aerial salute). Due to the nature of the effect, large salutes are some of the more hazardous fireworks.

Most of the "salutes" are made with flash powder. Flash powder has a fast burn rate, unlike black powder.

All ground salutes over 50 mg and air salutes over 130 mg are restricted by the United States Consumer Product Safety Commission (CPSC) and the Child Protection Act of 1966.

== Examples of salutes ==
- Cherry bomb
- M-80
- M-100
- Quarter stick
