= Flash powder =

Pyrotechnic mixture

Flash powder is a highly energetic and explosive pyrotechnic composition, a mixture of an oxidizer and a metallic fuel, which burns quickly (deflagrates) and produces a loud noise, regardless of confinement in some formulations. It is widely used in theatrical and display pyrotechnics and consumer fireworks, and was once used for flash photography.

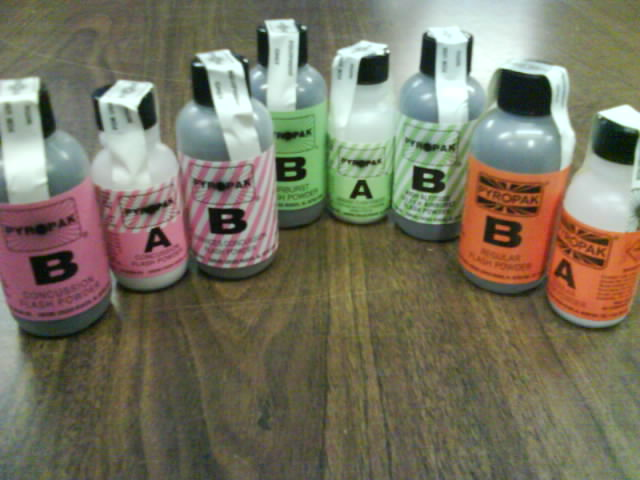
Examples of theatrical binary flash powders. Note the shared oxidizer (A) powder for some types of fuels (B).

Different varieties of flash powder are made from different compositions; most common are potassium perchlorate and aluminium powder. Early formulations used potassium chlorate instead of potassium perchlorate.

Flash powder compositions are also used in military pyrotechnics when production of large amount of noise or light is required, e.g., stun grenades, battle simulator devices, and photoflash bombs.

== History ==
Lycopodium powder is a yellow-tan dust-like powder historically used as a flash powder. Today, the principal use of the powder is to create flashes or flames that are large and impressive but relatively easy to manage safely in magic acts and for cinema and theatrical special effects.

== Mixtures ==
Normally, flash powder mixtures are compounded to achieve a particular purpose. These mixtures range from extremely fast-burning mixtures designed to produce a maximum audio report, to mixtures designed to burn slowly and provide large amounts of illumination, to mixtures that were formerly used in photography.

=== Photo-flash powders ===
For photography, fuel-rich mixtures containing magnesium and nitrates were used. The excess magnesium is volatilized by the reaction and burns in air providing additional light. In addition, the higher concentration of fuel results in a slower burn, providing a quieter sound when ignited. Various formulas from 1917 include: 1 oz (28 g) potassium nitrate to 1 oz (28 g) magnesium, 2 oz (57 g) magnesium to 0.5 oz (14 g) chrome alum, and 2 oz (57 g) magnesium to 0.5 oz (14 g) potassium chlorate. Fuel rich flash powders are also used in theatrical flash pots.

Magnesium based compositions degrade over long periods, meaning the metallic Mg will slowly react with atmospheric moisture. Commercial photographic flash powders are sold as two-part mixtures, to be combined immediately before use.

=== Aluminium and chlorate ===
The combination of aluminium powder and potassium chlorate is unstable, and is not generally used for flash powder that is to be stored for longer than a very short period. For that reason, in modern-day it has been largely replaced by potassium perchlorate mixtures.

The simplest is a two-component chlorate mix, although this is rarely used.

KClO_{3} + 2 Al → Al_{2}O_{3} + KCl

The composition is approximately 70% KClO_{3} : 30% Al by weight for the reactants of the above stoichiometrically balanced equation.

Sometimes a few percent of bicarbonate or carbonate buffer is added to the mixture to ensure the absence of acidic impurities.

Sulfur is often added as a third component to this mixture in order to reduce the activation energy. Antimony trisulfide may be used as an alternative as it is more stable in storage but its high toxicity has caused it to become a less popular option in recent years.

=== Potassium nitrate, aluminium and sulfur ===
This composition, usually in a ratio of 5 parts potassium nitrate, to 3 parts aluminium powder, to 2 parts sulfur, is especially popular with hobbyists. It is not very quick-burning unless exceptionally fine ingredients are used. Adding 2% by weight boric acid can potentially improve shelf-life and help prevent spontaneous combustion, as it neutralises amides created by decomposition of the nitrate.

2 KNO_{3} + 4 Al + S → K_{2}S + N_{2} + 2 Al_{2}O_{3}

The composition is approximately 59% KNO_{3} : 31.6% Al : 9.4% S by weight for the reactants of the above stoichiometrically balanced equation.

=== Aluminium and perchlorate ===
Aluminium powder and potassium perchlorate are the only two components of the pyrotechnic industry standard flash powder.

The balanced equation for the reaction is:

3 KClO_{4} + 8 Al → 3 KCl + 4 Al_{2}O_{3}

The stoichiometric ratio is 34.2% aluminum and 65.8% perchlorate by mass.

=== Magnesium and nitrate ===
Another flash composition consists of magnesium powder and potassium nitrate. Other metal nitrates have been used, including barium and strontium nitrates, which will color the flame during combustion. This mixture has been applied in solid propellants in aerospace.

2 KNO_{3} + 5 Mg → K_{2}O + N_{2} + 5 MgO

The composition is 62.4% KNO_{3} and 37.6% Mg by weight for the reactants of the above stoichiometrically balanced equation.

== Safety and handling ==
Flash powders often release deadly amounts of explosive force. Nearly all flash powder mixtures are sensitive to shock, friction and electrostatic discharge. Additionally, accidental contaminants such as strong acids or sulfur compounds can cause some mixtures to become more sensitive. Because flash powder mixtures are easy to initiate, there is a high risk of accidental explosion which can inflict severe blast/fragmentation injuries, e.g. blindness, explosive amputation, permanent maiming, or disfigurement; in rare cases fatalities have occurred.

Flash powders are often highly sensitive to friction, heat/flame and static electricity. A spark of as little as 0.1–10 millijoules can set off certain mixtures.

Most flash powder formulations (especially those that use micrometer flake aluminum powder or fine magnesium powder as their fuel) can self-confine and explode in relatively small quantities. This makes flash powder dangerous to handle, as it can cause severe hearing damage and amputation injury even when sitting in the open.

Self-confinement occurs when the mass of the pile provides sufficient inertia to allow high pressure to build within it as the mixture reacts. This is referred to as inertial confinement, and it is not to be confused with a detonation.

== See also ==
- Pyrotechnic initiator
- Sprengel explosive
- Thermite
- Black powder
- Lycopodium powder
- Stun grenade
