= Sherwood Battle Brockwell =

American firefighter

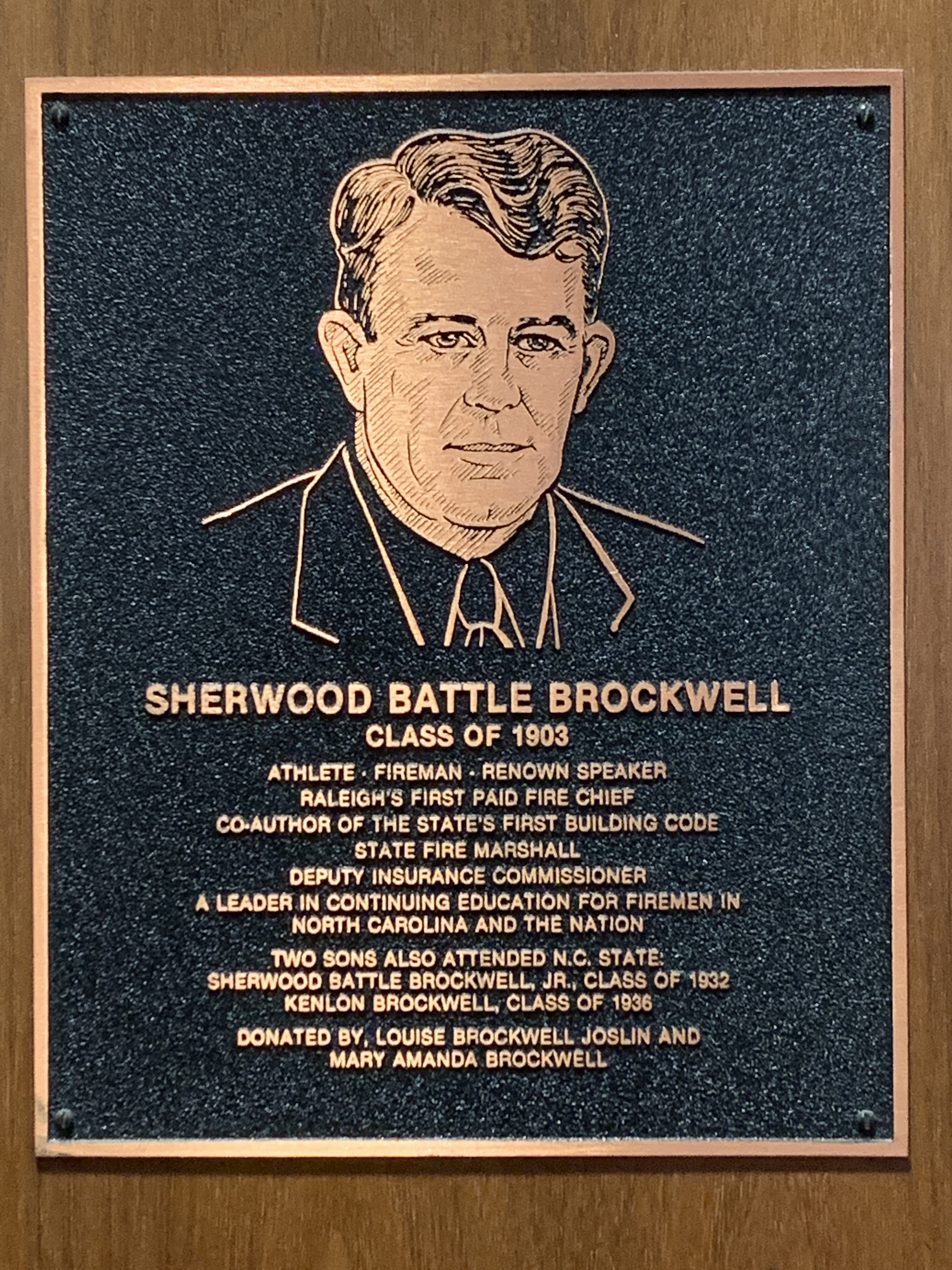
- Plaque at the Jane S. McKimmon Center
- Born: October 12, 1885; Raleigh, North Carolina, US
- Died: June 2, 1953 (aged 67); Raleigh, North Carolina, US
- Burial place: Historic Oakwood Cemetery
- Occupations: Fire Chief; Fire Marshal
- Spouse: Mildred Bagwell Brockwell
- Children: 4

Sherwood Battle Brockwell (October 12, 1885 – June 2, 1953) was a fire marshal, pioneer of fire safety and legislation in North Carolina, and Raleigh's first paid fire chief. Brockwell was the United States' oldest fire marshal at the time of his death.

== Early life ==
Brockwell was born on October 12, 1885, in Raleigh, North Carolina, to Thomas Francisco Brockwell and Katherine McLeod Feggan Brockwell. He grew up in north Raleigh and was a neighbor to the city's fire chief, which most likely inspired him to become one. Brockwell began to fight fires when he either 10 or 13 years old, following the firemen when the alarms sounded to help hitch the mules, light the firebox, and shovel coal for Raleigh's steam fire engine. "I went to fires and helped some" he later said.

Brockwell attended the North Carolina Agricultural and Mechanic College and North Carolina State University. He played sports for the four years he attended, becoming active in baseball, basketball, football, and wrestling. Brockwell belonged to the state Firemen's Association, and in 1902 also joined the Rescue Steam Fire Engine Company. In January 1903, Brockwell would become a full member of the organization eight months before he turned 18, which was then the youngest you could be for membership. Brockwell graduated from college with a mechanical engineering degree in 1903.

== Career ==
Brockwell served for nine years in the Fire Rescue Company, being promoted to the position of foreman in 1908, and assistant chief a year later in 1909. It was with the Rescue Company Brockwell helped set several "world records" in state firemen's tournaments. On June 7, 1912, Brockwell became the Raleigh Fire Department's first full-time fire chief, after replacing part-time fire chief Walter Woollcott. As fire chief, Brockwell organized the city's first fully paying fire department. At this time, Brockwell was the nation's youngest paid fire chief. In 1912, Brockwell travelled to New York City to join the New York City Fire Department for additional training in firefighting and administration. While in New York, Brockwell gained much publicity after his enthusiasm for firefighting was recognized in his training and during his first fire rescues. During his training, Brockwell viewed firsthand the advantages of motorized fire fighting equipment, which inspired him to bring the first motorized fire fighting and life saving equipment, such as a pulmotor, back to North Carolina when he returned. Brockwell believed that the best way to fight fires were to prevent them in the first place, advocating his viewpoint of the modernization of the equipment and training firefighters in speeches and lectures directed towards the state legislature.

When Brockwell returned to Raleigh two years later in 1914, he resigned as fire chief to be appointed by Colonel James R. Young to become deputy insurance commissioner, and the first State Fire Marshal, a position he would be in until his death. Two days after being appointed, Brockwell organized the first statewide firefighter department training system in the nation. which by 1941 would be in use in 37 states. The training system eventually became the North Carolina State Fire College in 1929. Brockwell's fire college layout would later be implemented in at least eight states, stretching from Florida to South Dakota. Brockwell was often known to lecture there when he had the time. Following the success of his fire college layout, Brockwell would also create a layout for safe school buildings and school fire drills, another layout which would be signed into law by the NC General Assembly in 1919. Brockwell also implemented laws requiring theater exits in 1923, requiring all state buildings to be constructed of fire-resistant materials in 1925, the North Carolina Hotel Fire law, and lastly the state building code in 1941. Brockwell was also one of the leading advocates for bringing restricting firework policy to the state, in which he advocated for before the North Carolina Senate in January 1941, calling the form of celebration a "barbaric" "fire hazard". For his work in improving building safety and safety in general, Brockwell was given "honorary member" status of the American Institute of Architects. Brockwell also became a part-time instructional staff for the Institute of Government in Chapel Hill in 1942.

During World War II, Brockwell studied at the Chemical Warfare School in Edgewood Arsenal, Maryland. Brockwell would later relay what he had learned such as how to diffuse incendiary bombs in lectures with police and fire chiefs across the state, and also with the Boy Scouts of America (BSA) and YMCA. When Brockwell returned to North Carolina, he began to implement more modern school fire drills, which would later be adopted by many southeastern states. Brockwell nearing the end of the war worked with the Twentieth Air Force to discuss and perform incendiary tests and test weather factors before the atomic bombings of Hiroshima and Nagasaki.

During his career, Brockwell also served as president of two subordinate organizations of the International Association of Fire Chiefs, being the Southeastern Fire Chiefs Association and North Carolina Fire Chiefs' Association. He also served as a chairman and later president of the Fire Marshals Association of North America.

== Personal life ==
Brockwell married Mildred Bagwell in 1904, who would later become the parents of their four children, Louise, Mary, Sherwood Jr., and Kenlon. Kenlon H. Brockwell would follow his father's career, graduating from North Carolina State University and becoming the Lieutenant Fire Marshall at Fort Bragg circa 1940. Sherwood Brockwell Jr. would also closely follow his father's career, being placed on the first Ordnance Bomb Disposal Company after enlisting as a Lieutenant and becoming Captain in the US Army in 1942, and was appointed district manager of the Eureka Fire Hose Division of United States Rubber Company in North Carolina and Virginia.

Brockwell was also a member of the Episcopal Church and worshipped at Christ Episcopal Church in Raleigh.

== Death and legacy ==
Brockwell died on June 2, 1953, with funeral services being held the following day at the Church of the Good Shepherd in Raleigh. For almost five years prior to his passing, Brockwell had been ill following a serious operation, yet he still continued to work nearly until his death. At the time of his death, Brockwell was the United States' oldest fire marshal, and grandfather to four grandchildren. On August 16, 1955, a portrait of Brockwell was made public by Mary Louise Joslin, his granddaughter, at the 68th annual convention of the state Firemen's Association. Brockwell also received a plaque in his honor at the Jane S. McKimmon Center at North Carolina State University.^{a}

== Notes ==
^aSee main photo of the plaque at the Jane S. McKimmon Center.
