= Donald Hoffman =

Donald Hoffman may refer to:

- Donald J. Hoffman (born 1952), American general
- Donald D. Hoffman (born 1955), American cognitive scientist and popular science author
- Don Hoffman, American children's author
