= International Fire Marshals Association =

International fire fighting association

- Abbreviation: IFMA
- Established: 1906; 120 years ago
- Type: Nonprofit
- Legal status: Voluntary association
- Purpose: "To network with other experts responsible for the prevention of fire, the investigation of fires, and/or public fire and life safety education programs"
- Region served: Canada; United States
- President: Laurie Christensen
- Website: Official website
- Formerly called: Fire Marshals Association of North America

The International Fire Marshals Association (also called the IFMA or the Fire Marshals Association of North America, being their former name) is an association under the National Fire Protection Association (NFPA) made up of 37 chapters spanning across the United States and Canada. Its purpose is to promote and support fire marshals internationally in their goals to promote fire prevention and safety.

Founded in 1906, the association was notable for organizing the first Fire Prevention Week and its efforts to prohibit the sale of fireworks, in which it found some success. Today, the association under the NFPA works towards adding a fire sprinkler requisite to the International Residential Code (IRC) for all new houses to be built. As for the history of the association itself, it had been led by pioneer fire chiefs such as Sherwood Battle Brockwell, and in 2024 incorporated Maryland as its 36th and newest U.S. chapter.

== History ==
The association was founded in 1906 as the "Fire Marshals Association of North America," with the purpose of promoting fire safety and prevention tactics. On October 9, 1911, the association, alongside the local insurance organization Western Insurance Union, held the first "Fire Prevention Week" to commemorate the memory of the Great Chicago Fire forty years prior. In 1913, the association advocated for teaching fire safety in all schools during their eighth annual convention. From 1914 to 1916 during World War I, the association would take efforts to reduce waste and likewise cost associated with firefighting, which an estimate from 1915 predicted to be around US$1,000,000,000 total. In 1916, the first requisites for becoming a fire marshal were written by NYC Fire Chief William Guerin for the association. In 1920, the association would push for legislation requiring safer garage buildings in all states after the growth of automotive industry in the United States. During the middle of the 1920s, the association would visit cities with poor fire records, where they worked to establish inspectors offices and prohibit the sale of fireworks.

In October 1926, the association unanimously voted to be incorporated into the larger National Fire Protection Association (NFPA) after being invited by its president at the time Dana Pierce. The incorporation would not change any of the governing body or their actions, and would serve to "simply bring these [two] closer together in a common cause" which had previously been "working on the same problem of fire prevention" separately, according to the Fire Marshal of Iowa, J. A. Tracy, who introduced the resolution. The action would take effect in May 1927, and the association would join as the "Fire Marshal Section".

After joining the NFPA, the association would work more towards creating uniform legislation to try to combat arson and firework misuse. In 1929, the association would propose a bill to state legislatures calling for clearer definitions of arson and increased prison time for offenders, and legislation further regulating fireworks in January 1938. In 1989, the organization hosted about 1,300 members.

The IFMA continues to sponsor Operation EDITH (Exit Drills In The Home) as a way to protect oneself in the case of particularly nighttime fires, and oppose the implementation of rescue decals due to their ability to become out of date quickly. They also have continued to advocate for the ban of fireworks for non-organizations, and have worked towards adding fire sprinklers to the International Residential Code (IRC) as a requisite to be placed in all new houses.

=== Legacy ===
During the association's push in the middle of the 1920s to prohibit the sale of fireworks: deaths and blindness caused by fireworks in Pennsylvania dropped from 16 and 43 cases respectively, to zero in both the following year. Firework incidents in the state likewise dropped from 1,702 to 40 between the two years as well. In 2006, CEO of the NFPA, Jim Shannon, would call the IFMA a "linchpin of the system," saying he was "pleased" to see their inclusion into their association by his predecessors.

== Governing body ==
The executive board of the association is made up of the positions of President, Vice President, Second Vice President, Secretary, Executive Secretary, and four board members. The current President is Laurie Christensen of Texas, who assumed office from the former President Kenneth E. Tyree of West Virginia. Members of the executive board are elected to the position by the NFPA.

While a complete list of former presidents is not known to exist, former Presidents include Kenneth E. Tyree of West Virginia (2022–2024), Chris Heiner of Rhode Island (2020–2022), Jon Nisja of Minnesota (2006–2008), Jim Crawford of Washington, John F. Bender (2003), J. Benjamin Roy Jr. of Delaware (1989), Sherwood Battle Brockwell of North Carolina, John G. Gamber of Illinois, Newman T. Miller of Indiana (1923), J. A. May of Iowa (1920), and Ole C. Ree (also possibly spelled as Ole O. Roe) of Iowa (1913–1914).

== Layout ==
The association modern-day is one of eleven Sections of the NFPA, titled the "International Fire Marshals Association Section". Within its section, the association has 37 chapters, made up of regions or states within the United States or Canada. In July 2023, the Maryland Fire Marshals Committee begun the process of becoming a chapter within the association, and were successfully admitted sometime in 2024.

Below is a table of all 37 chapters of the IFMA: listing their number, name/location within the IFMA, and their organizations name.

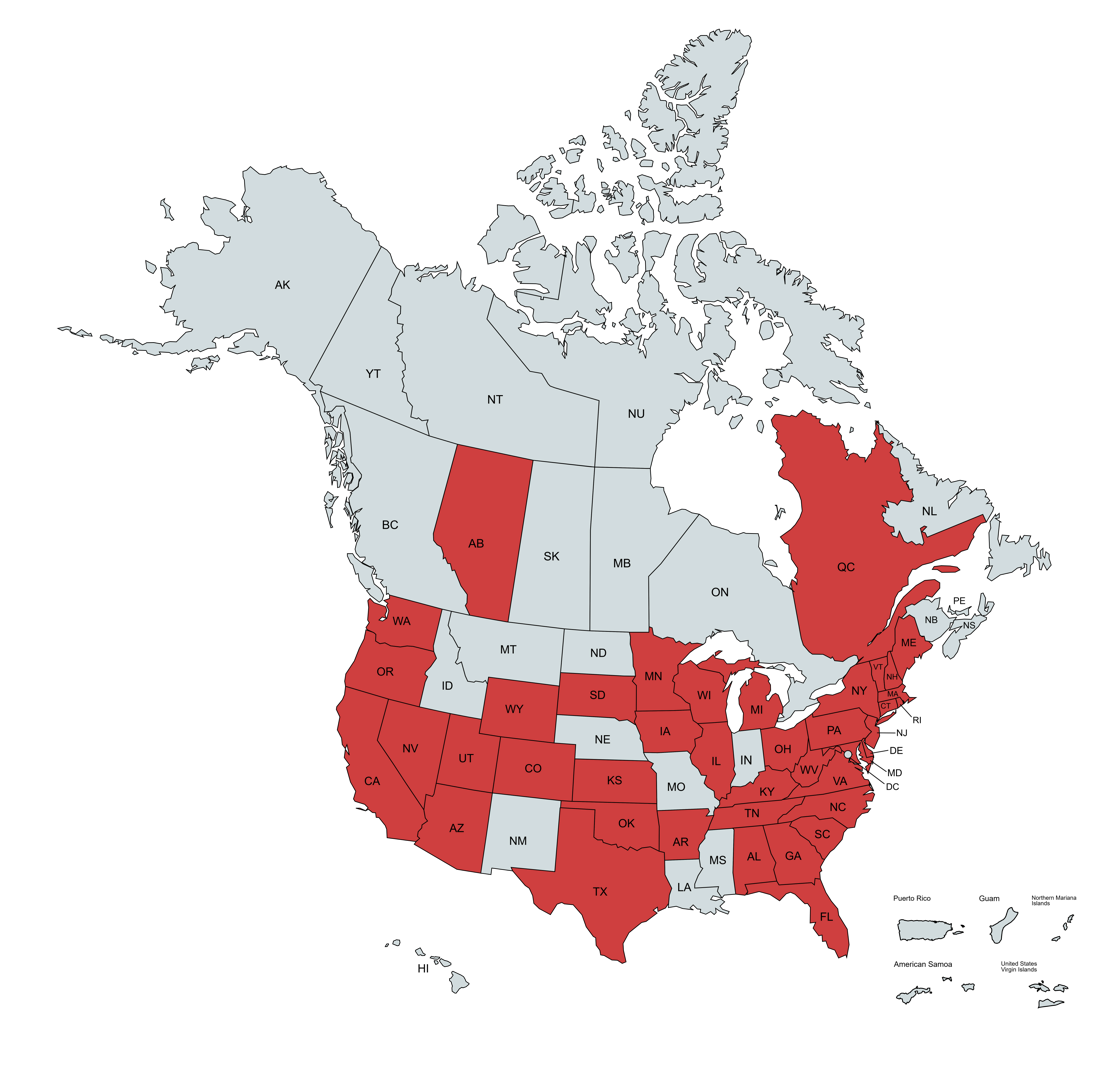
Map of the coverage of the 37 chapters of the International Fire Marshals Association

Chapter identification
Number	Name and location	Organization name
1	Michigan	Michigan Fire Inspectors Society
2	New England	New England Association of Fire Marshals
3	Florida	Florida Fire Marshals and Inspectors Association
4	New York	New York State Fire Marshals and Inspectors Association
5	Arizona	Arizona Fire Marshal Association
6	Delaware	Fire Marshals Association of Delaware Valley
7	Oklahoma	Fire Marshals Association of Oklahoma
8	Alabama	Fire Marshals Association of Alabama
9	Texas	Texas Fire Marshals Association
10	Alberta	Alberta Fire Safety Association
11	Minnesota	Fire Marshals Association of Minnesota
12	North Carolina	North Carolina Fire Marshals' Association
13	West Virginia	Fire Marshals Association of West Virginia
14	South Carolina	South Carolina Fire Marshals Association
15	Illinois	Illinois Fire Inspectors Association
16	Tennessee	Tennessee Fire Safety Inspectors Association
17	Utah	Fire Marshal's Association of Utah
18	Washington	Washington State Association of Fire Marshals
19	Oregon	Oregon Fire Marshals Association
20	Colorado	Fire Marshals Association of Colorado
21	New Jersey	New Jersey Fire Prevention & Protection Association
22	Nevada	Fire Prevention Association of Nevada
23	Wisconsin	Wisconsin State Fire Inspectors Association
24	Iowa	Iowa Fire Marshal's Association
25	Ohio	Ohio Fire Officials Association
26	Arkansas	Arkansas Fire Marshals Association
27	California (southern division)	California Fire Chiefs Association (south)
28	California (northern division)	California Fire Chiefs Association (north)
29	Virginia	Virginia Fire Prevention Association
30	Pennsylvania	Pennsylvania Association of Fire Code Officials
31	Kentucky	Kentucky Fire Inspectors Association
32	Kansas	Fire Marshals Association of Kansas
33	South Dakota	South Dakota Fire and Life Safety Committee
34	Wyoming	Wyoming Association of Fire Marshal's
35	Georgia	Georgia Fire Prevention Association
36	Maryland	Unclear
37	Quebec	L'association des techniciens en prévention du Québec

== See also ==
- International Association of Fire Chiefs
