= Fire Prevention Week =

Nationally observed week

- Official name: Fire Prevention Week
- Observed by: United States
- Date: October
- Frequency: Annual
- First time: 1925; 101 years ago

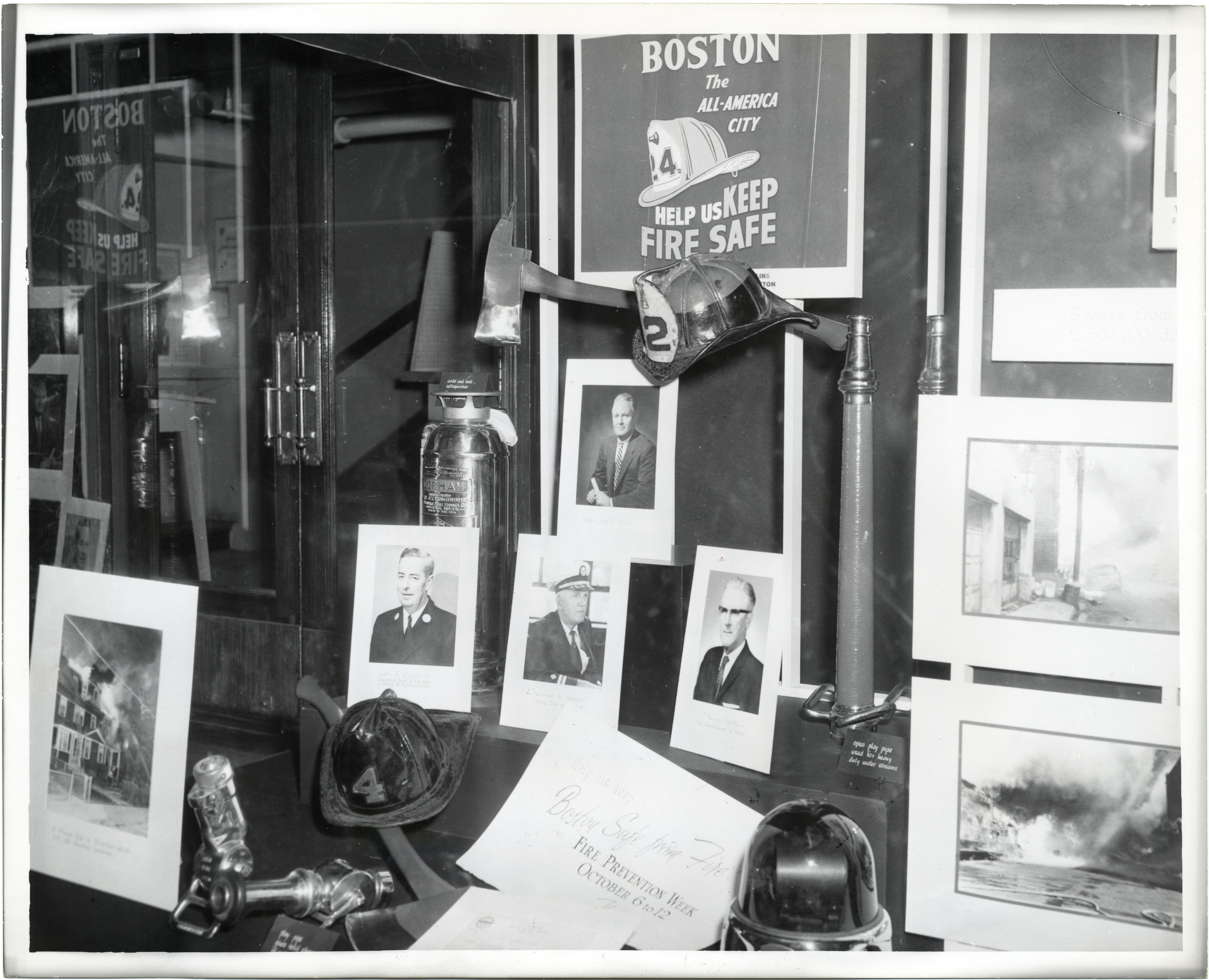
A window display advertises Mayor John F. Collins' declaration of Fire Prevention Week, 1963

Fire Prevention Week is a nationally observed week in the United States and Canada from the Sunday to Saturday in which October 9 falls.

In the United States, the first Presidential Proclamation of the week was made in 1925 by Calvin Coolidge. Since then, the parent organization of the Fire Marshals Association of North America who first created the week, the National Fire Protection Association (NFPA), continues to be the international sponsor of it.

In Canada, the week is proclaimed annually by the governor general. The Saturday at the end of the week is also proclaimed as "Fire Service Recognition Day" to express appreciation for the many public services of the Canadian fire service.

In Australia, Fire Prevention Week is usually held between April 28 to May 5.

== History ==
The Fire Prevention Week commemorates the Great Chicago Fire. On the 40th anniversary (1911) of the Great Chicago Fire, the Fire Marshals Association of North America (FMANA), the oldest membership section of the National Fire Protection Association (NFPA), sponsored the first National Fire Prevention Day, deciding to observe the anniversary as a way to keep the public informed about the importance of fire prevention. In May 1919, when the NFPA held its 23rd annual meeting in Ottawa at the invitation of the Dominion Fire Prevention Association (DFPA), the NFPA and DFPA both passed resolutions urging governments in the United States and Canada to support the campaign for a common Fire Prevention Day. This was expanded to Fire Prevention Week in 1922. The non-profit NFPA, which has officially sponsored Fire Prevention Week since its inception, selects the annual theme for Fire Prevention Week.

In the United States, the first National Fire Prevention Day proclamation was issued by President Woodrow Wilson in 1920. When President Calvin Coolidge proclaimed the first National Fire Prevention Week on October 4–10, 1925, he noted that in the previous year, some 15,000 people died from fire in the United States. Calling the loss "startling," Coolidge's proclamation stated: "This waste results from the conditions which justify a sense of shame and horror; for the greater part of it could and ought to be prevented... It is highly desirable that every effort be made to reform the conditions which have made possible so vast a destruction of the national wealth".

The Governor-General issued the first National Fire Prevention Day proclamation in Canada in 1919. The earliest known provincial proclamation of Fire Prevention Day was by the Lieutenant-Governor-in-Council of Ontario in 1916. Fire Prevention Week was first proclaimed by the Governor-General in 1923. Fire Service Recognition Day was first incorporated into the Governor-General's proclamation of Fire Prevention Week in 1977.

On October 12, 1957, the NBC children's western television series, Fury, starring Peter Graves and Bobby Diamond, aired the episode "Fire Prevention Week" to acquaint youngsters with the dangers of forest fires.

Dates and other information for National Fire Prevention Week are listed on the National Fire Protection Association website each year, including the annual theme.

Fire Prevention Week Themes Through the Years
Year	Theme
1925	Build Fire-Safe
1927	Why This Mad Sacrifice to Fire?
1928	FIRE...Do Your Part – Stop This Waste!
1929	FIRE - The Nation's Greatest Menace! Do Your Part to Stop this Waste!
1930	Fight Fire Waste with Fire Prevention. Do Your Part
1931	Do Your Part to Prevent Fire
1932	Your Life. Your Property
1933	Your Life. Your Property
1934	Now War on Fire
1935	What Would Fire Mean to You?
1936	Stop It
1937	Help Prevention Fires
1938	Is This Your Tomorrow?
1939	Was Somebody Careless?
1940	Keep Fire In Its Place
1941	Defend Against Fire
1942	Today Every Fire Helps Hitler
1943	Fire Fight for Axis! (to emphasize home fire prevention)
	Feed Firefighters Not Fires (farm and rural campaign)
	The War's Over for this Plant (industrial use)
	Was Somebody Careless (general purpose)
1944	To Speed Victory - Prevent Fires (general purpose)
	Feed Firefighters Not Fires (farm and rural campaign)
	To Speed Victory, Defeat Fire (town plaster)
1945	We Burned the Enemy - Now Save Yourself from Fire
1946	FIRE is the Silent Partner of Inflation
1947	YOU caused 1,700,000 Fires last Year!
1948	Help Yourself to Fire Prevention!
1949	Flameproof Your Future!
1950	Don't Let Fire Lick You
1951	Defend America From Fire
1952	Be Free from Fear of Fire
1953	Fire Feeds on Careless Deeds
1954	Let's Grow Up - Not Burn Up
1955	Don't Give Fire a Place to Start
1956	Don't Give Fire a Place to Start
1957	Make Sure of Their Tomorrows - Don't Give Fire a Place to Start
1958	Don't Give Fire a Place to Start
1959	Fire Prevention is Your Job...Too
1960	Don't Give Fire a Place to Start
1961	Don't Give Fire a Place to Start
1962	Fire Prevention is Your Job...Too
1963	Don't Give Fire a Place to Start
1964	Fire Prevention is Your Job...Too
1965	Don't Give Fire a Place to Start
1966	Fight Fire
1967	Fire Hurts
1968	Fire Hurts
1969	Fire Hurts
1970	Fire Hurts
1971	Fire Hurts
1972	Fire Hurts
1973	Help Stop Fire
1974	Things That Burn
1975	Learn Not to Burn
1976	Learn Not to Burn
1977	Where There's Smoke, There Should Be a Smoke Alarm
1978	You Are Not Alone!
1979	Partners in Fire Prevention
1980	Partners in Fire Prevention
1981	EDITH (Exit Drills In The Home)
1982	Learn Not To Burn - Wherever You Are
1983	Learn Not To Burn All Through the Year
1984	Join the Fire Prevention Team
1985	Fire Drills Save Lives at Home at School at Work
1986	Learn Not to Burn It Really Works!
1987	Play it Safe...Plan Your Escape
1988	A Sound You Can Live With—Test Your Smoke Detector!
1989	Big Fires Start Small: Keep matches and lighters in the right hands
1990	Make Your Place Firesafe: Hunt for Home Hazards
1991	Fire Won't Wait - Plan Your Escape!
1992	Test Your Detector - It's Sound Advice!
1993	Get Out, Stay Out: Your Fire Safe Response
1994	Test Your Detectors for Life
1995	Watch What You Heat: Prevent Home Fires!
1996	Let's Hear It For Safety: Test Your Detectors!
1997	Know When to Go: React Fast to Fire
1998	Fire Drills: The Great Escape
1999	Fire Drills: The Great Escape
2000	Fire Drills: The Great Escape
2001	Cover the Bases and Strike Out Fire
2002	Team Up for Fire Safety
2003	When Fire Strikes: Get Out, Stay Out!
2004	It's Fire Prevention Week! Test Your Smoke Alarms
2005	Use Candles with Care
2006	Prevent Cooking Fires. Watch What You Heat
2007	Practice Your Escape Plan
2008	Prevent Home Fires
2009	Stay Fire Safe. Don't Get Burned
2010	Smoke Alarms: A Sound You Can Live With
2011	Protect Your Family From Fire
2012	Have 2 Ways Out
2013	Prevent Kitchen Fires
2014	Working Smoke Alarms Save Lives. Test Yours Every Month
2015	Hear the Beep Where You Sleep. Every Bedroom Needs a Working Smoke Alarm
2016	Don't Wait. Check the Date. Replace Smoke Alarms Every 10 Years
2017	Every Second Counts. Plan Two Ways Out
2018	Look. Listen. Learn. Fire Can Happen Anywhere
2019	Not Every Hero Wears a Cape: Plan and Practice Your Escape
2020	Serve Up Fire Safety in the Kitchen
2021	Learn the Sounds of Fire Safety
2022	Fire Won't Wait, Plan Your Escape
2023	Cooking Safety Starts with YOU. Pay Attention to Fire Prevention.
2024	Smoke Alarms: Make Them WORK for You!
2025	CHARGE into Fire Safety: Lithium-Ion Batteries in Your Home
2026	CHARGE Into Fire Safety: Safe Charging Is a Superpower

== Noted fires ==
- 1871 Great Chicago Fire
- Peshtigo Fire
