= Samuel Becket Boyd II =

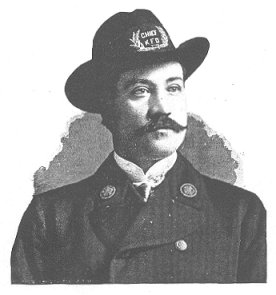
- Boyd circa 1900
- Born: March 20, 1865; Abingdon, Virginia, US
- Died: March 29, 1929 (aged 64); Knoxville, Tennessee, US
- Occupation: President of International Association of Fire Chiefs
- Spouse: Julia Harrison (1881–1957)

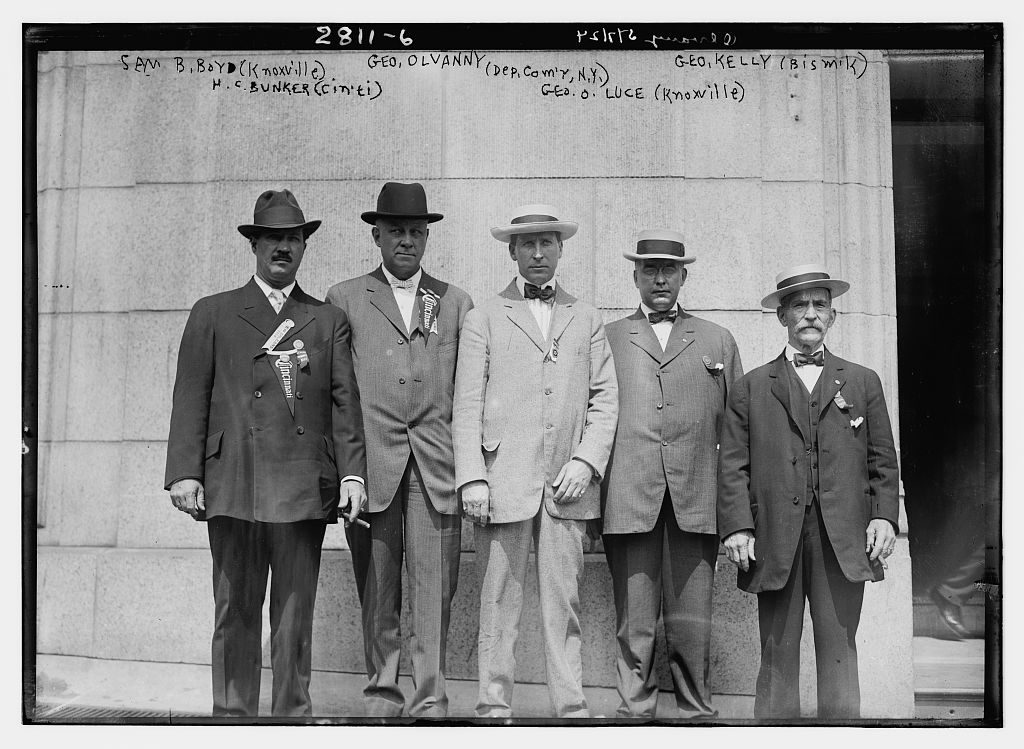
From left to right are: Sam B. Boyd of Knoxville, Tennessee; Henry C. Bunker of Cincinnati, Ohio; George Washington Olvany; George O. Luce of Ilion, New York; and George Kelly (fireman) of Bismarck, North Dakota, in 1913 in New York City

Samuel Becket Boyd II (March 20, 1865 – March 29, 1929) was an American firefighter. He was the fire chief of Knoxville, Tennessee, who died in the line of duty. He was president of the International Association of Fire Chiefs in 1924.

== Biography ==
He was born on March 20, 1865, in Abingdon, Virginia, to Samuel Becket Boyd I (1828–1890) and Isabella Reed (1831–1907). He had a sister, Isabella Kennedy Boyd (1860–1936) who married John Mebane Allen. He married Julia Harrison. He joined the fire department in 1900. He was president of the International Association of Fire Chiefs in 1924.

He died on March 29, 1929, of a heart attack in Knoxville, Tennessee, after a fire while en route to the hospital. He was buried in the Old Gray Cemetery in Knoxville, Tennessee.
