= International Association of Fire Chiefs =

International fire fighting association

- Abbreviation: IAFC
- Established: 1873; 153 years ago
- Type: Nonprofit
- Headquarters: McLean, Virginia
- Region served: Canada; United States
- President: Steven A. Locke
- Website: Official website

The International Association of Fire Chiefs (IAFC) is a non-profit network of more than 12,000 fire chiefs and emergency officers in over 30 countries. The Association was established in 1873 with John S. Damrell as president. It is headquartered in McLean, Virginia, United States. The President and Chair of the Board is Trisha L. Wolford from Anne Arundel County, Maryland. The CEO and Executive Director is Donna Black.

During the late 19th century, as many U.S. cities transitioned from volunteer to paid fire departments, a confluence of factors such as major fires and communication advancements led to the establishment of IAFC. Key figures from cities like Portland, Chicago, Boston, and Baltimore gathered in 1873 in New York City to consider the creation of a national association for fire chiefs. The inaugural convention, convened in October of that year, drew 61 participants and elected Chief Engineer John S. Damrell of Boston as its first President. The organization's original name, the National Association of Fire Engineers, underscored the aim to foster idea exchange and introduce innovative firefighting machinery. By 1884, the inclusion of Canadian fire chiefs prompted a name change to the International Association of Fire Engineers, evolving into the International Association of Fire Chiefs in 1926.

IAFC's headquarters have transitioned over the years, from Baltimore to New York City's Case-Shepperd-Mann Publishing Company in the 1920s, then to Washington, D.C., in the 1970s, and eventually to McLean, VA in 1992. The IAFC's annual conference, an uninterrupted tradition since 1873 (except during World War I and II), has grown and diversified. In 1994, the conference was renamed Fire-Rescue International (FRI).

== Divisions ==
The association is broken into eight divisions spanning across Canada and the United States.

- "Canada Division" (covering all of Canada)
- "Eastern Division" (covering Delaware, Maryland, New Jersey, New York, Pennsylvania, and Washington D.C.)
- "Great Lakes Division" (covering Illinois, Indiana, Michigan, Minnesota, Ohio, and Wisconsin)
- "Missouri Valley Division" (covering Colorado, Iowa, Kansas, Missouri, North Dakota, Nebraska, South Dakota, and Wyoming)
- "New England Division" (covering New Hampshire, Vermont, Connecticut, Maine, Massachusetts, and Rhode Island)
- "Southeastern Division" (covering Alabama, Florida, Georgia, Kentucky, Mississippi, North Carolina, Puerto Rico, South Carolina, Tennessee, U.S. Virgin Islands, Virginia, and West Virginia)
- "Southwestern Division" (covering Arkansas, Louisiana, New Mexico, Oklahoma, and Texas)
- "Western Division" (covering Alaska, Arizona, California, Hawaii, Idaho, Montana, Nevada, Oregon, Utah, Washington, and the Pacific Territories)

== Presidents ==
=== 2001–present ===
The following were presidents:

- 2026 Steven A. Locke - South Burlington, Vermont
- 2025 Trisha L. Wolford - Anne Arundel County, Maryland
- 2024 Josh Waldo - Bozeman, Montana
- 2023 John S. Butler - Fairfax County, Virginia
- 2022 Donna Black - Duck, North Carolina
- 2021 Kenneth Stuebing - Halifax, Nova Scotia
- 2020 Richard R. Carrizzo - Southern Platte, MO
- 2019 Gary Ludwig - Champaign, IL
- 2018 Dan Eggleston - Albemarle County, VA
- 2017 Tom Jenkins - Rogers, AR
- 2016 John Sinclair - Kittitas Valley, WA
- 2015 Rhoda Mae Kerr - Austin, TX
- 2014 G. Keith Bryant - Oklahoma City, OK
- 2013 William R. Metcalf - Fallbrook, CA
- 2012 Henry C. Clemmensen - Inverness, IL
- 2011 Albert H. Gillespie - North Las Vegas, NV
- 2010 John E. Parow - Chelmsford, MA
- 2009 Jeffrey D. Johnson - Tualatin Valley, OR
- 2008 Larry J. Grorud - Janesville, WI
- 2007 Steven P. Westermann - Central Jackson Co., MO
- 2006 James B. Harmes - Grand Blanc, MI
- 2005 William D. Killen - Kingsport, TN
- 2004 Robert A. DiPoli - Needham, MA
- 2003 Ernest Mitchell Jr. - Pasadena, CA
- 2002 Randy R. Bruegman - Milwaukie, OR
- 2001 John M. Buckman III - Evansville, IN

=== 1901–2000 ===
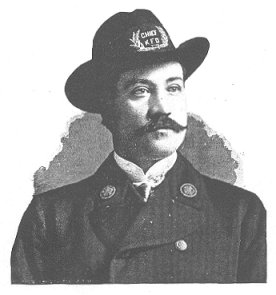
Boyd was president in 1924

- 2000 Michael R. Brown - Port Orchard, WA
- 1999 Luther L. Fincher Jr. - Charlotte, NC
- 1998 Richard A. "Smokey" Dyer - Lee's Summit, MO
- 1997 Richard A. Marinucci - Farmington Hills, MI
- 1996 R. David Paulison - Metro Dade County, FL
- 1995 P. Lamont Ewell - Oakland, CA
- 1994 Thomas L. Siegfried - Altamonte Springs, FL
- 1993 Philip D. McGouldrick - Cape Elizabeth, ME
- 1992 Gary L. Nichols - Sedgewick County, KS
- 1991 James L. Halsey - Troy, MI
- 1990 W. David Hilton - Cobb County, GA
- 1989 M.H. Jim Estepp - Prince George's Co., MD
- 1988 Ronny J. Coleman - Fullerton, CA
- 1987 Warren E. Isman - Fairfax County, VA
- 1986 Robert H. Ely - Kirkland, WA
- 1985 Ben Vossenaar - Rotterdam, Netherlands
- 1984 Gerard A. Carle - Dracut, MA
- 1983 Douglas R. Pollington - Cambridge, Ontario
- 1982 Charles Kamprad - St. Louis, MO
- 1981 E. Stanley Hawkins - Tulsa, OK
- 1980 Jack Lee - Charlotte, NC
- 1979 R.S. Rockenbach - Grayslake, IL
- 1978 James H. Shern - Pasadena, CA
- 1977 John Swindle - Birmingham, AL
- 1976 Myrle K. Wise - Denver, CO
- 1975 David B. Gratz - Montgomery Co., MD
- 1974 John F. Hurley - Rochester, NY
- 1973 Beverley Wade New - Minos, Nova Scotia
- 1972 Lawrence L. Kenney - Miami, FL
- 1971 Curtis W. Volkamer - Chicago, IL
- 1970 Matthew Jiminez - Hayward, CA
- 1969 Walter H. Carter - Lynn, MA
- 1968 Edward A. Beadle - Union City, NJ
- 1967 Calvin Weatherly - Wyrick Greensboro, NC
- 1966 Lester R. Schick - Davenport, IA
- 1965 Adrian J. Meyers - Grand Rapids, MI
- 1964 Reginald F. Swanborough - Hamilton, Ontario
- 1963 Raul Gandara - Santurce, Puerto Rico
- 1962 Lewis A. Marshall - Providence, RI
- 1961 Edward F. Deignan - Elizabeth, NJ
- 1960 William J. Taylor - Burbank, CA
- 1959 A.H. Lintelman - Baytown, TX
- 1958 Reynold C. Malmquist - Minneapolis, MN
- 1957 Donald S. Charles - Charlotte, NC
- 1956 Wayne E. Swanson - Rockford, IL
- 1955 William Fitzgerald - Seattle, WA
- 1954 C. Gray Burnett - Ottawa, Ontario
- 1953 Henry G. Thomas - Hartford, CT
- 1952 George R. McAlpine - Oklahoma City, OK
- 1951 Rudolph H. Swanson - Coral Gables, FL
- 1950 John H. Alderson - Los Angeles, CA
- 1949 William J. Cawker - Topeka, KS
- 1948 Henry R. Chase - Miami, FL
- 1947 Frank C. McAuliffe - Chicago, IL
- 1946 Charles A. Delaney - Lakewood, OH
- 1945 Samuel J. Pope - Boston, MA
- 1944 Samuel J. Pope - Boston, MA
- 1943 Art J. Baker - Lewistown, MT
- 1942 Andrew T. Callahan - Harrison, NJ
- 1941 W. Ralph Williams - Fresno, CA
- 1941 Andrew T. Callahan - Harrison, NJ
- 1940 W. Hendrix Palmer - Charlotte, NC
- 1939 Ray Tiller - Waterloo, IA
- 1938 Roy E. Mottshead - Dearborn, MI
- 1937 Daniel B. Tierney - Arlington, MA
- 1936 Robert A. Bogan - Baton Rouge, LA
- 1935 Charles J. Brennan - San Francisco, CA
- 1934 John J. Towey - Newark, NJ
- 1933 Selden R. Allen - Brookline, MA
- 1932 Richard Lee Smith - Pittsburgh, PA
- 1931 Dennis W. Brosnan - Albany, GA
- 1930 Joseph N. Sullivan - Utica, NY
- 1929 Ralph J. Scott (fire chief) - Los Angeles, CA
- 1928 John M. Evans (fire chief) - New Orleans, LA
- 1927 Ross B. Davi - Philadelphia, PA
- 1926 Thomas R. Murphy - San Francisco, CA
- 1925 James Armstrong (fire chief) - Kingston, Ontario
- 1924 Samuel Becket Boyd II (1865-1929) Knoxville, Tennessee.
- 1923 William H. Bywaters Salt Lake City, UT
- 1922 Charles W. Ringer - Minneapolis, MN
- 1921 Frank G. Reynolds - Augusta, GA
- 1920 John F. Healey - Denver, CO
- 1919 John Kenlon - New York City, New York
- 1918 Antonio Alonzo Rozetta - Nashville, TN
- 1917 Thomas A. Clancey - Milwaukee, WI
- 1916 Thomas A. Clancey - Milwaukee, WI
- 1915 Harry L. Marston - Brockton, MA
- 1914 Hugo R. Delfs - Lansing, MI
- 1913 Thomas W. Haney - Jacksonville, FL
- 1912 Horace F. Magee - Dallas, TX
- 1911 W.H. Loller - Youngstown, OH
- 1910 John Thompson (fire chief) - Toronto, Ontario
- 1909 George W. Horton - Baltimore, MD
- 1908 Fillmore Tyson - Louisville, KY
- 1907 M.E. Higgins - Albany, NY
- 1906 George M. Kellogg - Sioux City, IA
- 1905 John Stagg (fire chief) - Paterson, New Jersey
- 1904 Walthall Robertson Joyner - Atlanta, Georgia
- 1903 Walthall Robertson Joyner - Atlanta, Georgia
- 1902 Edward F. Croker - New York City, New York
- 1901 Miles S. Humphreys - Pittsburgh, Pennsylvania. He was also Mayor of Pittsburgh, Pennsylvania

=== 1873–1900 ===
- 1900 Miles S. Humphreys - Pittsburgh, PA
- 1899 John P. Quigley - Syracuse, NY
- 1898 Charles E. Swingley - St. Louis, MO
- 1897 Andrew J. Kennedy - New Haven, CT
- 1896 James Devine - Salt Lake City, UT
- 1895 Frank J. Roulett - Augusta, GA
- 1894 Zepherin Benoit - Montreal, Quebec
- 1893 James Foley (fire chief) - Milwaukee, WI
- 1892 Edward Hughes (fire chief) - Louisville, KY
- 1891 A.P. Leshure - Springfield, MA
- 1890 James Battle - Detroit, MI
- 1889 George Consider Hale - Kansas City, Missouri
- 1888 F.L. Stetson - Minneapolis, MN
- 1887 Walthall Robertson Joyner - Atlanta, Georgia
- 1886 George A. Steere - Providence, RI
- 1885 Thomas L. Worthley - Long Branch, New Jersey
- 1884 Denis J. Swenie - Chicago, IL
- 1883 Thomas O'Connor - New Orleans, LA
- 1882 Joseph Bunker - Cincinnati, OH
- 1881 G. Watt Taylor - Richmond, VA
- 1880 William A. Green - Boston, MA
- 1879 Martin Cronin (fire chief) - Washington, DC
- 1878 John A. Bennett (fire chief) - Cleveland, OH
- 1877 William Stockell - Nashville, TN
- 1876 William H. Johnson (fire chief) - Philadelphia, PA
- 1875 Albert C. Hendrick - New Haven, CT
- 1874 H. Clay Sexton - St. Louis, MO
- 1873 John Stanhope Damrell - Boston, Massachusetts

== See also ==
- International Fire Marshals Association
- National Fire Protection Association
