= Raleigh Fire Department =

Coordinates: 35°46′38.532″N 78°38′39.6348″W

Operational area
- Country: United States
- State: North Carolina
- City: Raleigh

Agency overview
- Established: December 1912
- Annual calls: 62,033 (2018)
- Employees: 607 (2015)
- Annual budget: $65,597,527 (2020)
- Fire chief: Herbert Griffin
- IAFF: 548

Facilities and equipment
- Battalions: 5
- Stations: 28
- Engines: 27
- Trucks: 5
- Tillers: 4
- Squads: 2
- Rescues: 1
- HAZMAT: 5
- USAR: 4
- Wildland: 3
- Rescue boats: 2
- Light and air: 2

Website
- Official website
- IAFF website

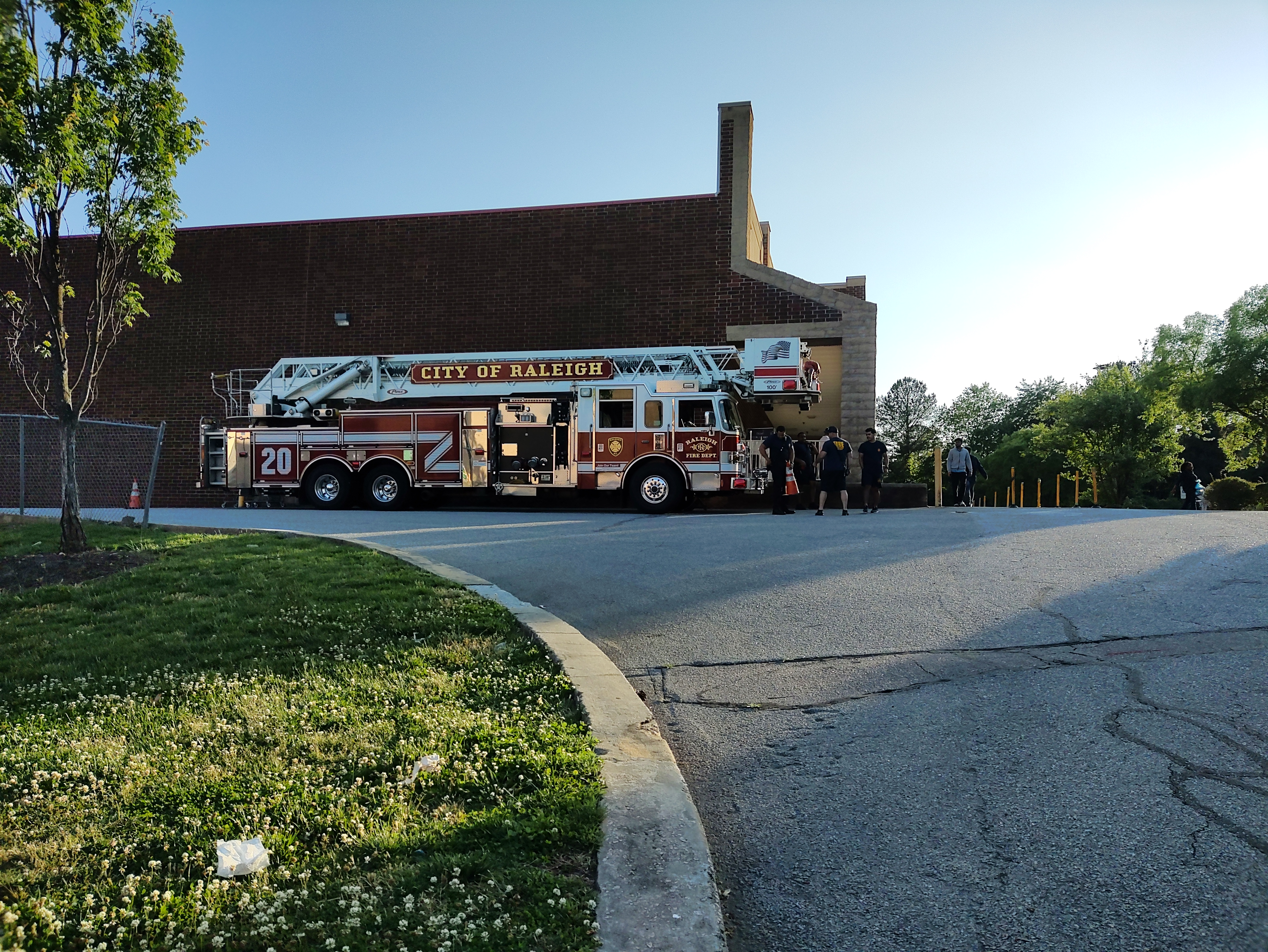
City of Raleigh fire engines

The Raleigh Fire Department (RFD) provides fire protection and emergency medical services to the city of Raleigh, North Carolina. The department, which was formed in December 1912, serves over 460,000 people spanning an area of 145 square miles (380 km^{2}).

== Stations and apparatus ==
As of February 2021, below is a complete listing of all facilities and apparatus locations in the City of Raleigh.

Fire Station Number	Neighborhood	Engine Company/Squad Company	Ladder Company	Special Units	Chief officer
1	Downtown Raleigh	Engine 1 Engine 13	Ladder 1		Car 401, Car 402 Fire Investigation Units
2	South Raleigh	Engine 2		HazMat 2	
3	Downtown/Oakwood	Engine 3			
4	Six Forks	Engine 4	Ladder 4		
5	Cameron Village	Engine 5			
6	Five Points	Engine 6	Ladder 6		
7	Historic Oakwood	Squad 7		Mini Pumper 7, Water Rescue Boats	
8	West Raleigh	Engine 8		HazMat 8	Battalion 3
9	North Hills	Engine 9			Battalion 5
10	Southeast Raleigh	Engine 10		Air 10	
11	Brentwood	Engine 11			
12	Walnut Creek/Worthdale	Engine 12	Ladder 12		Battalion 2, Division Chief 1
14	Meredith Woods	Squad 14	Ladder 14	Mini Pumper 14, Water Rescue Boats, Trench Rescue Unit	
15	Millbrook	Engine 15	Ladder 15		
16	Crabtree Valley	Engine 16		Rescue 16	
17	Pleasant Valley	Engine 17			
18	North Creedmoor	Engine 18			Battalion 4
19	Mini-City	Engine 19			Battalion 1
20	Southwest Raleigh	Engine 20	Ladder 20		
21	Hedingham	Engine 21		Water Rescue Unit (USAR 801)	
22	Northeast Raleigh	Engine 22	Ladder 22	HazMat 22	
23	Leesville	Engine 23			
24	Brier Creek	Engine 24	Ladder 23		
25	Wakefield	Engine 25			
26	Southeast Raleigh	Engine 26			
27	Northeast Raleigh	Engine 27		Hazmat 27	
28	Wake Cossroads	Engine 28		Air 28, Mini Pumper 1	
29	Leesville	Engine 29		Hazmat 29	
Keeter Training Center	South Raleigh	Engine 50, Engine 51		USAR Units	
Services	East Raleigh	Reserve Units			
Headquarters	Downtown Raleigh				Fire Chief (Car 1) Operations (Car 2) Services (Car 3) Fire Marshall (Car 4) Training (Car 5)

== Gallery ==
Raleigh firefighters

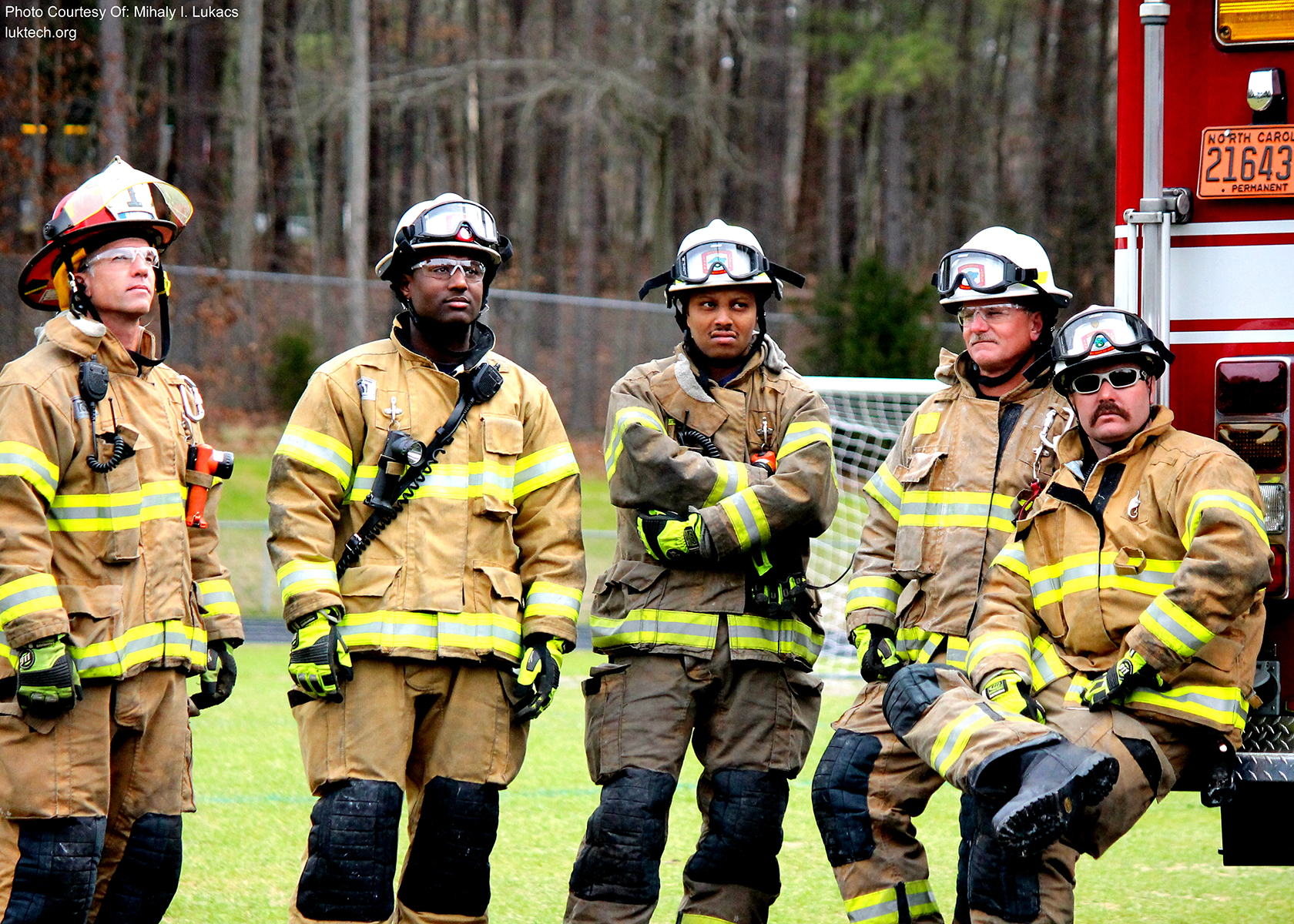
Raleigh firefighters at a high school demonstration

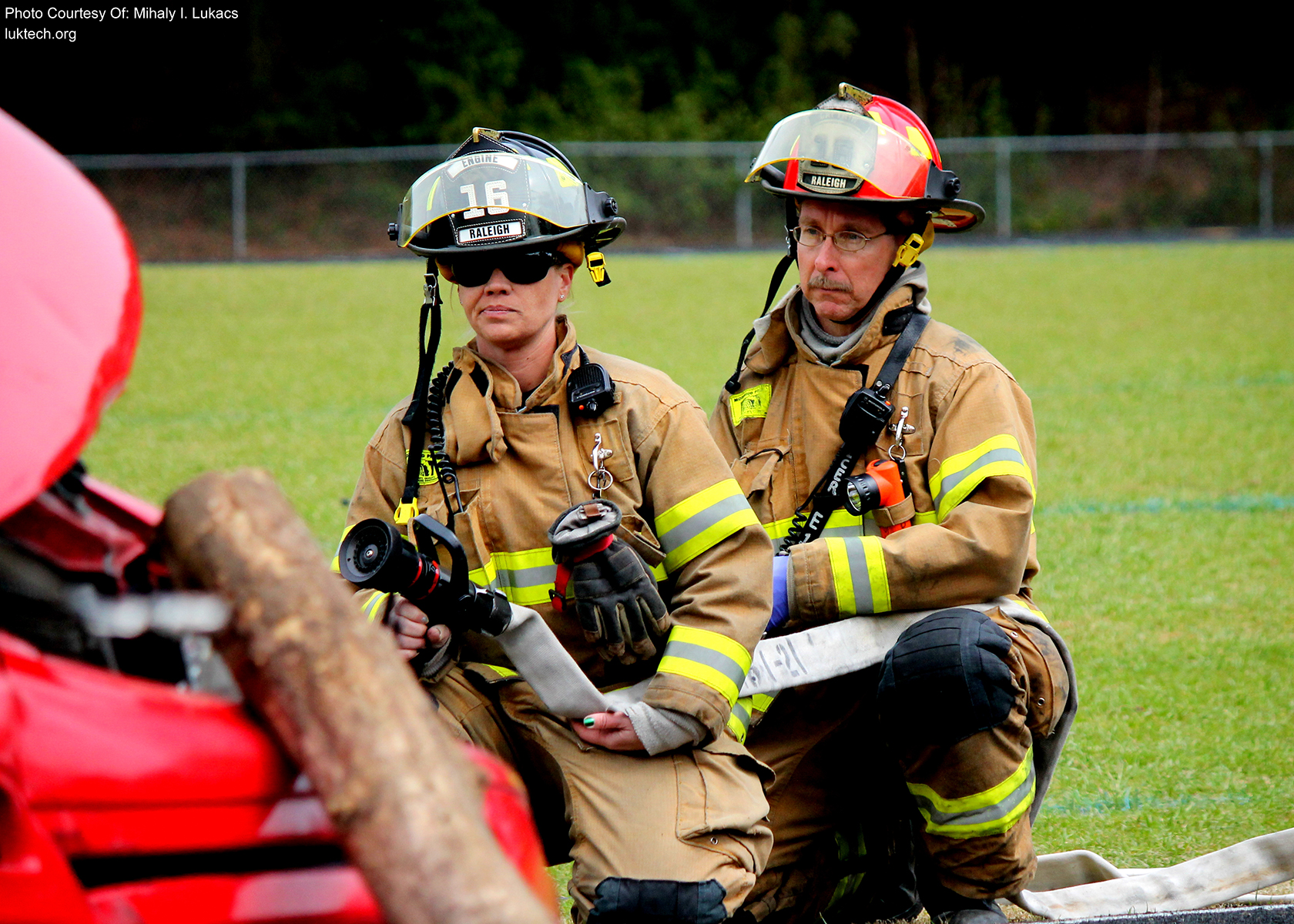
Raleigh firefighters prepare for a possible fire.

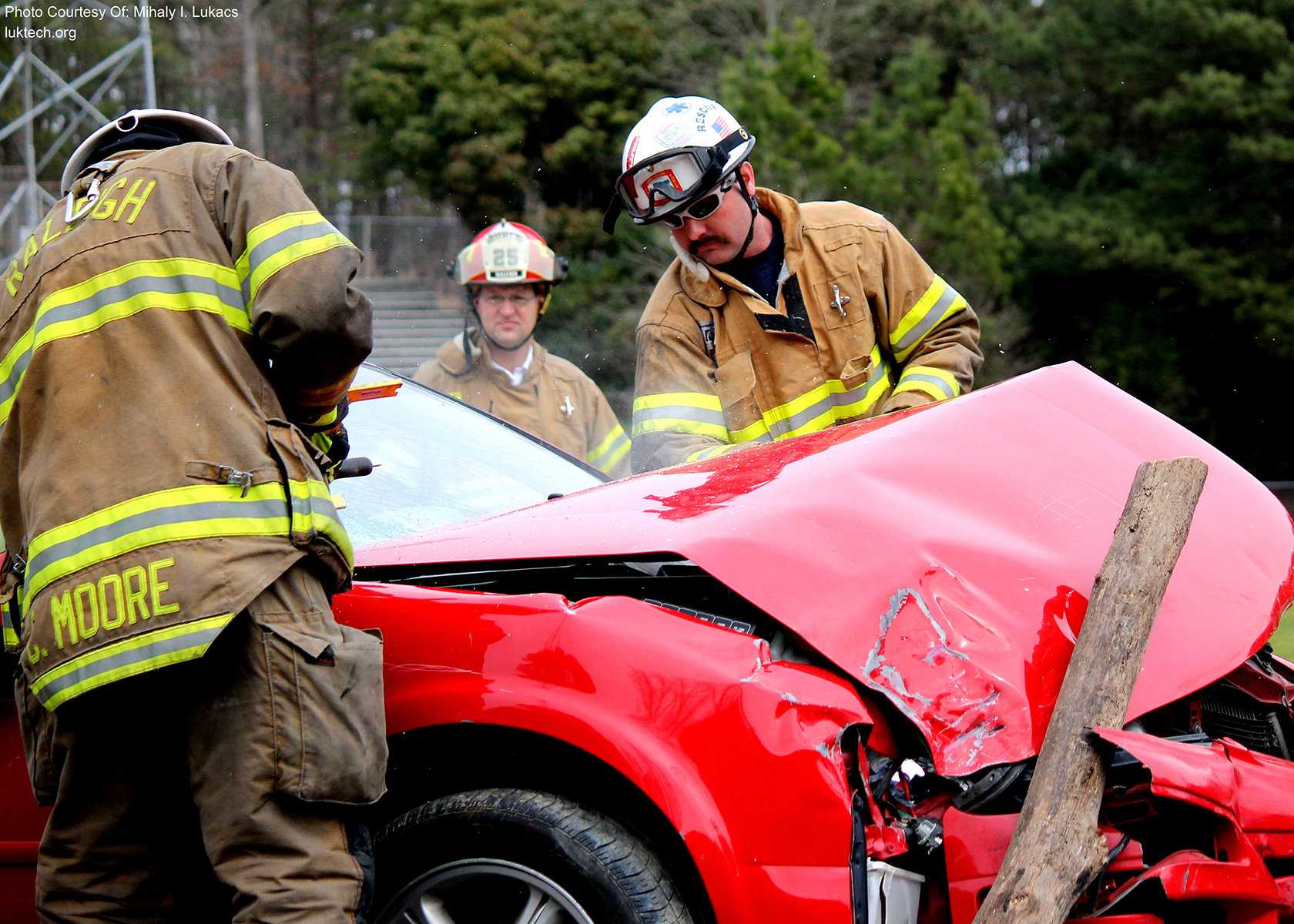
Raleigh firefighters work on dismantling a car.

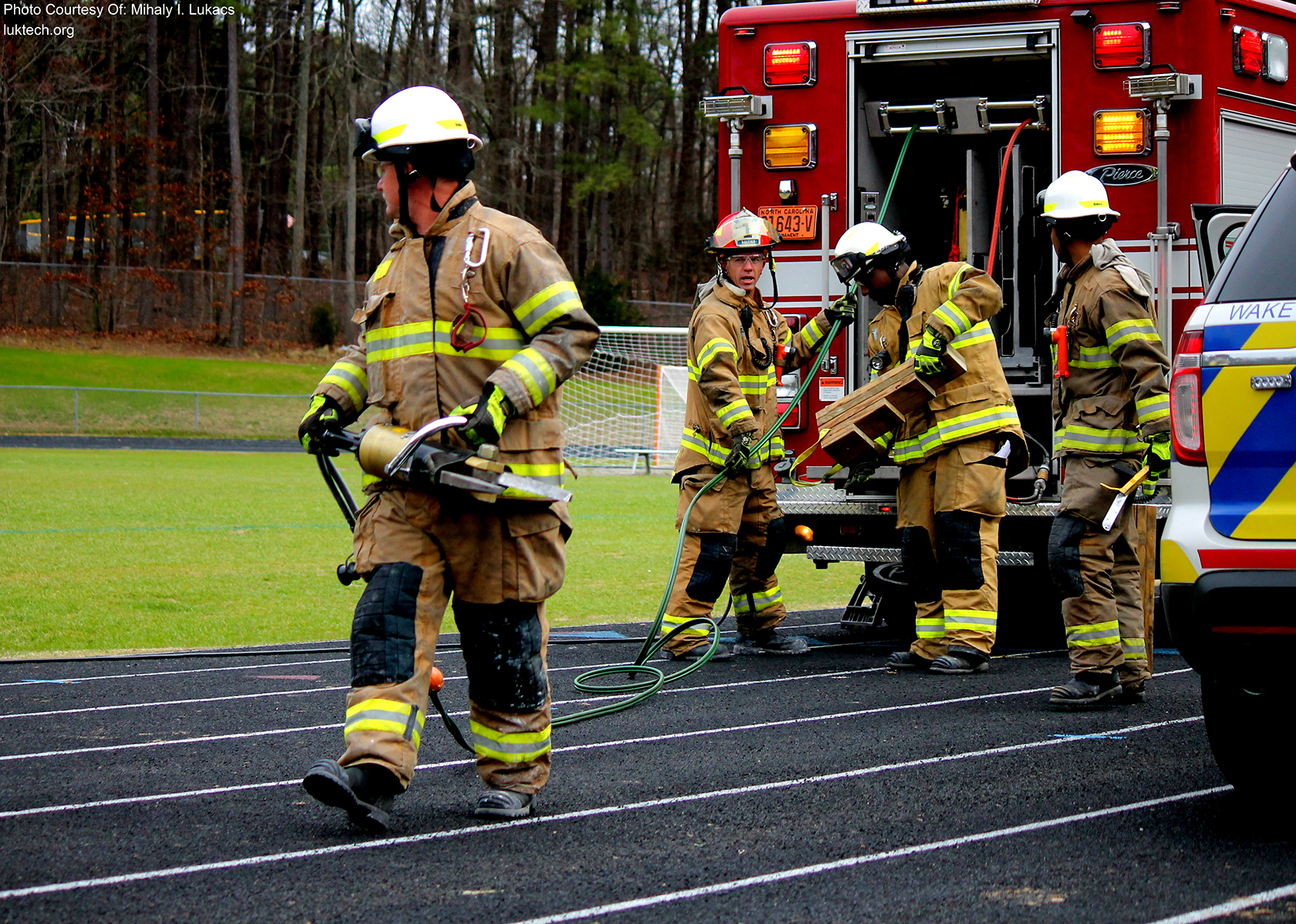
Raleigh firefighters prepare at the scene of an accident.
