= National Fire Protection Association =

International nonprofit organization

- Abbreviation: NFPA
- Founded: November 6, 1896; 130 years ago
- Type: Nonprofit
- Purpose: Industry standards, publications, conferences
- Headquarters: Quincy, Massachusetts, U.S.
- Region served: Worldwide
- Members: 50,000 (2023)
- President and CEO: James Pauley
- Volunteers: 10,000 (2025)
- Website: nfpa.org

The National Fire Protection Association (NFPA) is a U.S.-based international nonprofit organization devoted to eliminating death, injury, property damage, and economic loss due to fire, electrical, and related hazards. As of 2025, the NFPA claims to have 50,000 members and 10,000 volunteers spanning 80 countries, working with the organization through its 250 technical committees.

== History ==
In 1895, a Committee on Automatic Sprinkler Protection was formed in Massachusetts by men affiliated with several fire insurance companies and a pipe manufacturer to develop a uniform standard for the design and installation of fire sprinkler systems. At the time, there were nine such standards in effect within 100 miles (160 km) of Boston, Massachusetts, and such diversity was causing great difficulties for plumbers working in the New England region.

The next year, the committee published its initial report on a uniform standard and later formed the NFPA in late 1896. The committee's initial report evolved into NFPA 13, Standard for the Installation of Sprinkler Systems, the most widely used fire sprinkler standard.

Around 1904, the NFPA began expanding its membership from affiliates of fire insurance companies to many other organizations and individuals, and also broadened its mission beyond promulgating fire sprinkler standards.

== Codes and standards ==
The association publishes more than 300 consensus codes and standards intended to minimize the possibility and effects of fire and other risks. The codes and standards are administered by more than 250 technical committees consisting of approximately 9,000 volunteers.

== Mascot ==
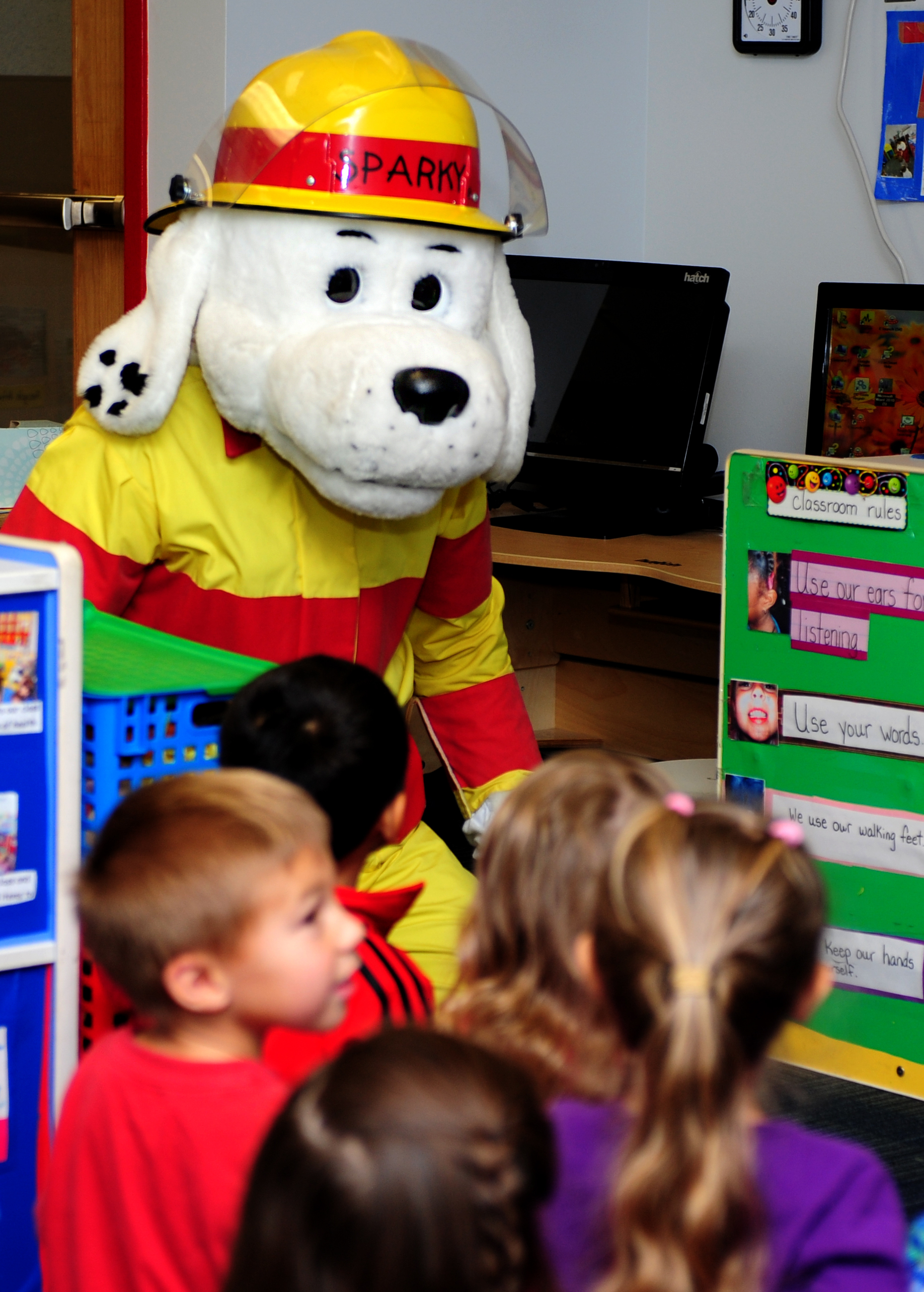
Sparky the Fire Dog

Sparky the Fire Dog is the official mascot of the National Fire Protection Association. Created in 1951 to promote fire safety education for children, he is a Dalmatian dressed in firefighting gear.

A children's book about Sparky by Don Hoffman was published in 2011. He serves as the spokesdog for Fire Prevention Week each October in the United States and Canada.

== Sponsorship ==
NFPA sponsored a NASCAR O'Reilly Auto Parts Series race at the Martinsville Speedway on March 28, 2026, called the NFPA 250.
