= Don Hoffman =

American author of children's literature

- Occupations: Writer, publicist
- Writing career
- Genre: Children's literature
- Notable works: A Very Special Snowflake, Sparky the Fire Dog
- Website: donhoffmanauthor.com

Don Hoffman is an American author of children’s literature. His published works include A Very Special Snowflake and Sparky the Fire Dog. He is also the founder of Peek-A-Boo Publishing and its LGBTQ-oriented imprint, RainbowKidz.

== Selected bibliography ==
- Sparky the Fire Dog (2011)
- A Very Special Snowflake (2008)
- A Counting Book with Billy & Abigail (2004)
- Good Morning, Good Night Billy & Abigail (2004)
- Abigail Is a Big Girl: Are You a Big Girl Too? (2002)
- Billy Is a Big Boy (2002)
