= Tubri =

Type of Indian firework

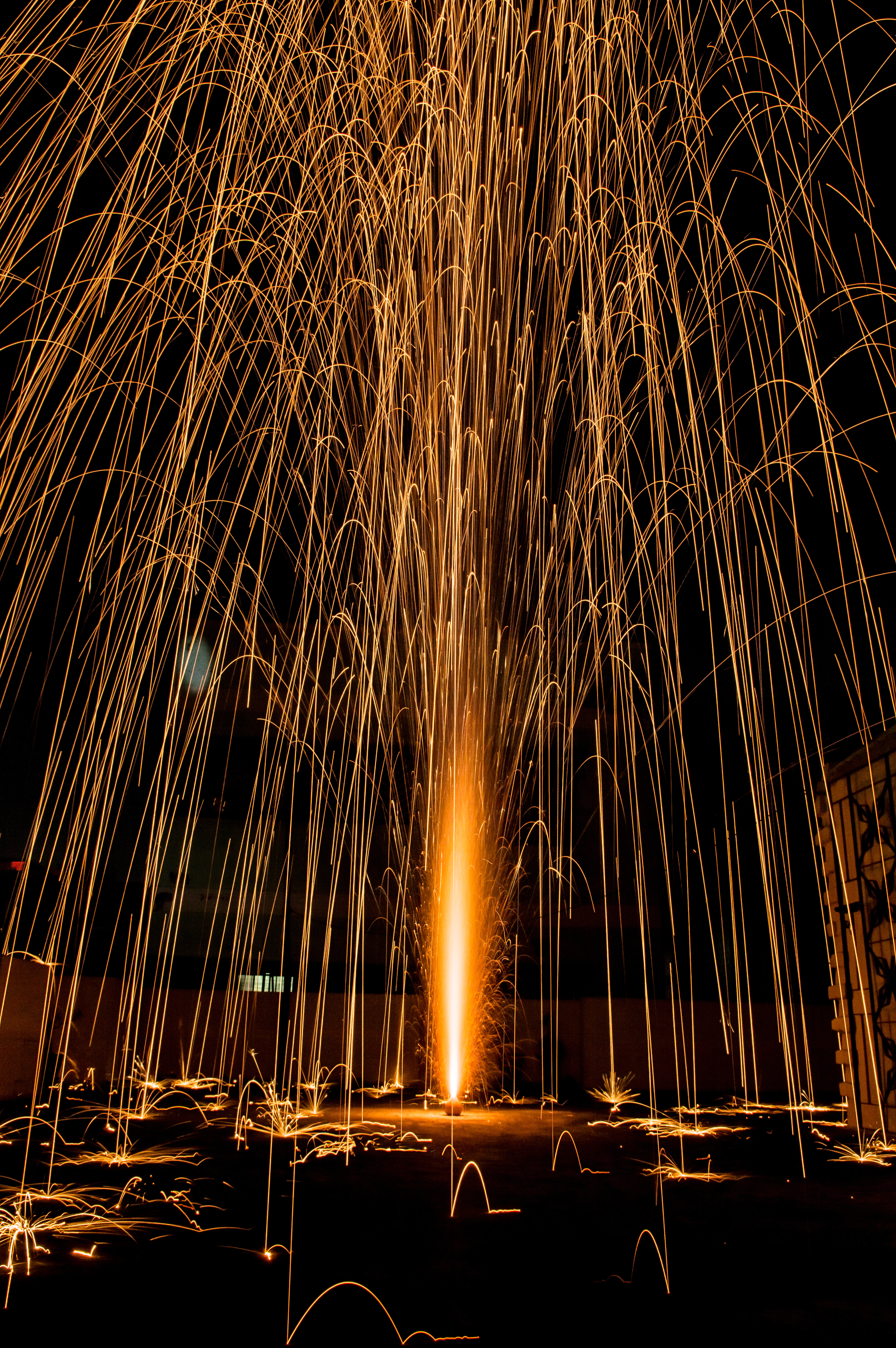
Large tubri creating brilliant light and sparkles at night

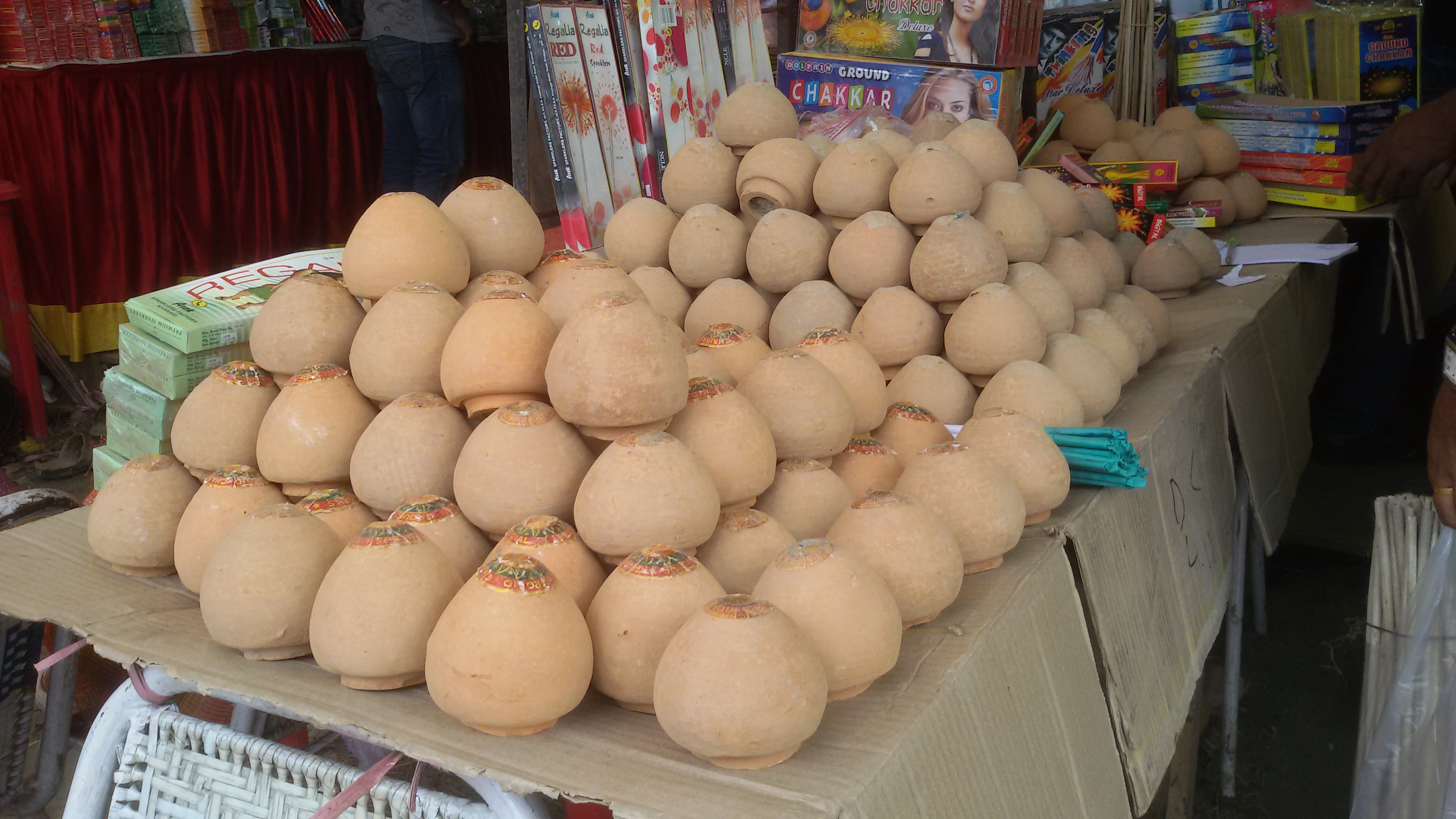
Tubris on sale at the Behala Blind School grounds

Tubri is a firework used during Diwali in India. A tubri is made from a spherical hollow terracotta shell with a flat base and a hole at the top. The inside of it is stuffed with layers of gunpowder (generally a combination of potassium nitrate, charcoal, sulfur and iron particles) with some earth at the bottom. The tubri is made to sit on the ground on its base with the hole at the top. A spark is provided at the top which lights it up producing colourful sparkles rising up to great heights. In West Bengal, tubri competitions are held during the Kali Puja.
