= United States observances =

The United States has many observances.

== Days ==
- January 13 - Stephen Foster Memorial Day
- February 1 - National Freedom Day
- April 13 - Thomas Jefferson's birthday
- May 1 - Law Day
- May 1 - Loyalty Day
- 1st Thu. in May - National Day of Prayer
- 2nd Sun. in May - Mother's day (USA)
- 3rd Sat. in May - Armed Forces Day
- 3rd Fri. in May - National Defense Transportation Day
- May 15 - Peace Officers Memorial Day
- May 22 - National Maritime Day
- last Mon. in May - Memorial Day
- June 14 - Flag Day
- June 14-July 4 - Honor America Days
- 3rd Sun. in June - Father's Day
- July 27 - National Korean War Veterans Armistice Day (expired 2003)
- 4th Sun. in July - Parent's Day
- August 19 - National Aviation Day
- 1st Sat. aft. 1st Mon. in September (Labor Day) - Carl Garner Federal Lands Cleanup Day
- 1st Sun. aft. 1st Mon. in September (Labor Day) - National Grandparents Day
- September 11 - Patriot Day
- September 17 - Constitution Day and Citizenship Day
- last Sun. in September - Gold Star Mother's Day
- 1st Mon. in October - Child Health Day
- October 9 - Leif Erikson Day
- 2nd Mon. in October - Columbus Day
- October 15 - White Cane Safety Day
- December 7 - National Pearl Harbor Remembrance Day
- December 17 - Pan American Aviation Day
- December 17 - Wright Brothers Day

== Weeks ==
- 1st in March - Save Your Vision Week
- 3rd in March - National Poison Prevention Week
- week of May 15 - Police Week
- week ending Fri. before Memorial Day - National Safe Boating Week
- week of 3rd Fri. in May - National Transportation Week
- week of June 14 - National Flag Week
- June 14 (Flag Day) to July 4 (Independence Day) - Honor America Days
- September 17 to September 23 - Constitution Week
- 2nd Sun. in October - National School Lunch Week
- 3rd Sun. in October - National Forest Products Week

== Months ==
- February - American Heart Month
- April - Cancer Control Month
- May - Asian/Pacific Islander American Heritage Month
- May - Steelmark Month
- September 15 to October 15 - National Hispanic Heritage Month
- October - National Disability Employment Awareness Month (US)

== See also ==
- Title 36 of the United States Code
- International observance
- List of observances in the United States by presidential proclamation
