= United States federal observances =

Periods designated by the U.S. Congress

Observances in the United States
- Public • Paid • Federal • Observance • School • Hallmark
- Observed by: Federal government
- Type: National

United States federal observances are days, weeks, months, or other periods designated by the United States Congress for the commemoration or other observance of various events, activities, or topics. These observances differ from federal holidays in that federal employees only receive a day free from work on holidays, not observances. Federal observances that are designated by Congress appear in Title 36 of the United States Code (36 U.S.C. § 101 et seq.). Below is a list of all observances so designated. Note that not all of the laws below require that the observance be declared, in some cases, such as 36 U.S.C. § 114, Congress simply requested the president to issue a proclamation of the observance. (Note: Federal observances are published at Pub. L. 105–225, Aug. 12, 1998, 112 Stat. 1256.; Pub. L. 105–225, Aug. 12, 1998, 112 Stat. 1261.; Pub. L. 105–225, Aug. 12, 1998, 112 Stat. 1262.; Pub. L. 107–89, § 1, Dec. 18, 2001, 115 Stat. 876.; and Pub. L. 114–240, § 2(a), Oct. 7, 2016, 130 Stat. 974..) The president may also declare observances by presidential proclamation.

== List of observances ==
=== Days ===
Date	Observance	Details	Ref.
January 13 (Fixed)	Stephen Foster Memorial Day	Calls upon the people of the U.S. to observe the day with appropriate ceremonies, pilgrimages to Foster's memorial sites, and musical programs featuring his compositions.	36 U.S.C. § 140
February 1 (Fixed)	National Freedom Day	Commemorates the signing of the Thirteenth Amendment by President Abraham Lincoln on February 1, 1865.	36 U.S.C. § 124
April 13 (Fixed)	Thomas Jefferson's Birthday	Calls upon the people of the U.S. to commemorate Jefferson's birthday in schools, churches, "or other suitable places."	36 U.S.C. § 141
March 9 (Fixed)	U.S. Hostages and Wrongful Detainees Day	Calls upon the people to observe the holiday with "appropriate ceremonies and activities" and for the Hostage and Wrongful Detainee flag to be displayed.	36 U.S.C. § 148
May 1 (Fixed)	Law Day, U.S.A.	For the people of the U.S. to appreciate their liberties under U.S. law by displaying the American flag on all government buildings and appropriate ceremonies in schools "or other suitable places."	36 U.S.C. § 113
May 1 (Fixed)	Loyalty Day	For the people of the U.S. to reaffirm their loyalty to the United States by displaying the American flag on all government buildings and appropriate ceremonies in schools "or other suitable places."	36 U.S.C. § 115
May 1–7 (Floating Thursday)	National Day of Prayer	Sets aside a day on which the people of the U.S. "may turn to God in prayer and meditation at churches, in groups, and as individuals."	36 U.S.C. § 119
May 8–14 (Floating Sunday)	Mother's Day	Calls upon government officials to display the American flag on all government buildings and upon the people of the U.S. to display the flag at their homes as a public expression of love and reverence for their mothers.	36 U.S.C. § 117
May 15 (Fixed)	Peace Officers Memorial Day	In honor of federal, state, and local officers killed or disabled in the line of duty, Congress directs government officials to display the American flag at half-staff and calls upon the people of the U.S. to commemorate the day, including displaying the flag at half-staff.	36 U.S.C. § 136
May 15–21 (Floating Friday)	National Defense Transportation Day	Urges the people of the U.S. in all communities served by the various forms of transportation to recognize the importance of the U.S. transportation infrastructure to their communities in times of conflict and peace.	36 U.S.C. § 120
May 22 (Fixed)	National Maritime Day	Calls upon government officials to display the American flag on all government buildings and upon the people of the U.S. to display the flag at their homes.	36 U.S.C. § 128
May 25–31 (Floating Monday)	Memorial Day	Calls on the people of the U.S. and the media to observe the day by praying, according to their individual religious faith, for permanent peace, at a specific time proclaimed by the president. Memorial Day is also a federal holiday.	36 U.S.C. § 116
June 14 (Fixed)	Flag Day	Calls upon government officials to display the American flag on all government buildings and upon the people of the U.S. to display the flag at their homes in celebration of the flag's official adoption on June 14, 1777.	36 U.S.C. § 110
June 15–22 (Floating Sunday)	Father's Day	Calls upon government officials to display the American flag on all government buildings and upon the people of the U.S. to offer public and private expressions of love and gratitude to their fathers.	36 U.S.C. § 109
July 22–28 (Floating Sunday)	Parents' Day	Calls upon the people of the U.S. to recognize the day through proclamations, activities, and educational efforts that uplift and support the role of parents in raising their children.	36 U.S.C. § 135
July 27 (Fixed)	National Korean War Veterans Armistice Day	Calls upon government officials to display the American flag at half-staff on all government buildings and upon the people of the U.S. to host appropriate celebrations each year until 2003.	36 U.S.C. § 127
August 19 (Fixed)	National Aviation Day	Calls upon government officials to display the American flag at on all government buildings and upon the people of the U.S. to generate interest in aviation in the United States.	36 U.S.C. § 118
September 6–12 (Floating Saturday)	Carl Garner Federal Lands Cleanup Day	Calls upon the people of the U.S. to celebrate the day with appropriate cleanup activities. States may move the day if inclement weather takes place on the first Saturday after Labor Day.	36 U.S.C. § 104
September 7–13 (Floating Sunday)	National Grandparents Day	Calls upon the people of the U.S. to celebrate the day with appropriate activities. Takes place the first Sunday after Labor Day.	36 U.S.C. § 125
September 11 (Fixed)	Patriot Day	Calls upon all organizations and people of the U.S. to display the American flag at half-staff in honor of those who lost their lives in the September 11 attacks in 2001.	36 U.S.C. § 144
September 17 (Fixed)	Constitution Day and Citizenship Day	Calls upon civil and educational authorities of state and local governments to celebrate the day by educating the public about their responsibilities and opportunities as citizens of the United States and their respective states and localities.	36 U.S.C. § 106
September 24–30 (Floating Sunday)	Gold Star Mother's Day	Calls upon government officials to display the American flag on all government buildings and upon the people of the U.S. to display the flag at their homes as a public expression of love, sorrow, and reverence for Gold Star mothers.	36 U.S.C. § 111
October 1–8 (Floating Monday)	Child Health Day	Calls upon all agencies and organizations interested in child welfare to make the people of the U.S. aware of the fundamental necessity of a year-round program to protect and develop the health of the children in the United States.	36 U.S.C. § 105
October 9 (Fixed)	Leif Erikson Day	Commemorates Leif Erikson, the Norse explorer.	36 U.S.C. § 114
October 8–14 (Floating Monday)	Columbus Day	Calls upon government officials to display the American flag on all government buildings and upon the people of the U.S. to celebrate the voyages of Christopher Columbus to the Americas. Columbus Day is also a federal holiday.	36 U.S.C. § 107
October 15 (Fixed)	White Cane Safety Day	Calls upon the people of the U.S. to celebrate the achievements of people who are blind or visually impaired and the important symbol of blindness and tool of independence, the white cane.	36 U.S.C. § 142
November 11 (Fixed)	Veterans Day	Calling on the people of the United States to observe two minutes of silence beginning at 11:11 a.m. Pacific Standard Time. Veterans Day is also a federal holiday.	36 U.S.C. § 145
December 7 (Fixed)	National Pearl Harbor Remembrance Day	Calls upon all organizations and people of the U.S. to display the American flag at half-staff in honor of those who lost their lives during the attack on Pearl Harbor in 1941.	36 U.S.C. § 129
December 17 (Fixed)	Pan American Aviation Day	Calls upon all organizations and people of the U.S. to stimulate interest in aviation in the United States, advancements in rapid communications, and the cultural development between countries of the Western Hemisphere.	36 U.S.C. § 134
December 17 (Fixed)	Wright Brothers Day	Calls upon the people of the U.S. to celebrate the anniversary of the first successful flights in a heavier-than-air aircraft that were made by the Wright brothers in 1903.	36 U.S.C. § 143

=== Weeks ===
Week	Observance	Details	Ref.
First week of March	Save Your Vision Week	Urges the media, health care professions, and other agencies and individuals to support programs to support programs to improve and protect the vision of the people of the U.S. and to convince them of the importance of their vision to their welfare and the welfare of the country.	36 U.S.C. § 138
Third week of March	National Poison Prevention Week	Aims to encourage the people of the U.S. to learn of the dangers of accidental poisoning and to take preventive measures according to the seriousness of the dangers.	36 U.S.C. § 130
Week containing May 15	Police Week	Recognizes of the service given by those who protect the people of the U.S. through law enforcement and invites state governments, local governments, and people to display the American flag at half-staff, among other appropriate activities.	36 U.S.C. § 137
Week containing the third Friday of May	National Transportation Week	Invites the people of the U.S. to commemorate those who move goods and individuals throughout the country.	36 U.S.C. § 133
Week ending on the Friday before Memorial Day	National Safe Boating Week	Invites the people of the U.S. to understand the importance of safe boating practices.	36 U.S.C. § 131
Week containing June 14	National Flag Week	Calls upon the people of the U.S. to display the American flag.	36 U.S.C. § 122
September 17–23	Constitution Week	Invites the people of the U.S. to celebrate the anniversary of the signing of the United States Constitution on September 17, 1787.	36 U.S.C. § 108
Week beginning the second Sunday of October	National School Lunch Week	Celebrates the creation of the 1946 federal law that provides low-cost or free school lunch meals to qualifying students.	36 U.S.C. § 132
Week beginning the third Sunday of October	National Forest Products Week	Recognizes the value of forest products and the conservation practices that help responsibly manage the forests of the United States.	36 U.S.C. § 123

=== Months ===
Month	Observance	Details	Ref.
February	American Heart Month	Urges the people of the U.S. to recognize the nationwide problem of heart-related diseases and to support programs required to solve the problem.	36 U.S.C. § 101
April	Cancer Control Month	Invites the medical profession, media, and all others interested in a national program for the control of cancer to unite and make the people of the U.S. aware of the need for a program.	36 U.S.C. § 103
May	Asian/Pacific American Heritage Month	Calls upon the people of the U.S. to recognize the contributions and influence of Asian Americans and Pacific Islander Americans to the history, culture, and achievements of the United States.	36 U.S.C. § 102
May	Steelmark Month	Calls upon the people of the U.S. to recognize the contribution made by the iron and steel industry to national security and defense.	36 U.S.C. § 139
September 15 – October 15	National Hispanic Heritage Month	Calls upon the people of the U.S. to recognize the contributions and influence of Hispanic Americans to the history, culture, and achievements of the United States.	36 U.S.C. § 126
October	National Disability Employment Awareness Month	Aims to garner public support for and interest in the employment of workers with disabilities who are otherwise qualified.	36 U.S.C. § 121

=== Other ===
Period	Observance	Notes	Ref.
Flag Day through Independence Day (21 days)	Honor America Days	Congress declares that there be public gatherings and activities for the people of the U.S. to honor the United States.	36 U.S.C. § 112
