= Title 36 of the United States Code =

U.S. federal statutes on patriotic observances

The United States Code is the official compilation of the Federal laws of a general and permanent nature that are currently in force. Title 36 covers "Patriotic and National Observances, Ceremonies, and Organizations."

== Parts ==
Title 36 of the United States Code
- US Flag

=== Subtitle I: Patriotic and National Observances and Ceremonies ===
==== Part A: Observances and Ceremonies ====
- Chapter 1: Patriotic and National Observances
  - § 101. American Heart Month
  - § 102. Asian/Pacific American Heritage Month
  - § 103. Cancer Control Month
  - § 104. Carl Garner Federal Lands Cleanup Day
  - § 105. Child Health Day
  - § 106. Constitution Day and Citizenship Day
  - § 107. Columbus Day
  - § 108. Constitution Week
  - § 109. Father's Day
  - § 110. Flag Day
  - § 111. Gold Star Mother's Day
  - § 112. Honor America Days
  - § 113. Law Day, U.S.A.
  - § 114. Leif Erikson Day
  - § 115. Loyalty Day
  - § 116. Memorial Day
  - § 117. Mother's Day
  - § 118. National Aviation Day
  - § 119. National Day of Prayer
  - § 120. National Defense Transportation Day
  - § 121. National Disability Employment Awareness Month
  - § 122. National Flag Week
  - § 123. National Forest Products Week
  - § 124. National Freedom Day
  - § 125. National Grandparents Day
  - § 126. National Hispanic Heritage Month
  - § 127. National Korean War Veterans Armistice Day
  - § 128. National Maritime Day
  - § 129. National Pearl Harbor Remembrance Day
  - § 130. National Poison Prevention Week
  - § 131. National Safe Boating Week
  - § 132. National School Lunch Week
  - § 133. National Transportation Week
  - § 134. Pan American Aviation Day
  - § 135. Parents' Day
  - § 136. Peace Officers Memorial Day
  - § 137. Police Week
  - § 138. Save Your Vision Week
  - § 139. Steelmark Month
  - § 140. Stephen Foster Memorial Day
  - § 141. Thomas Jefferson's birthday
  - § 142. White Cane Safety Day
  - § 143. Wright Brothers Day
  - § 144. Patriot Day
  - § 145. Veterans Day
  - § 189. National POW/MIA Recognition Day
- Chapter 3: National Anthem, Motto, Floral Emblem, and March
  - § 301. National anthem
  - § 302. National motto
  - § 303. National floral emblem
  - § 304. National march
  - § 305. National tree
  - § 306. National bird
- Chapter 5: Presidential Inaugural Ceremonies
  - § 501. Definitions
  - § 502. Regulations, licenses, and registration tags
  - § 503. Use of reservations, grounds, and public spaces
  - § 504. Installation and removal of electrical facilities
  - § 505. Extension of wires along parade routes
  - § 506. Duration of regulations and licenses and publication of regulations
  - § 507. Application to other property
  - § 508. Enforcement
  - § 509. Penalty
  - § 510. Disclosure of and prohibition on certain donations
  - § 511. Authorization of appropriations
- Chapter 7: Federal Participation in Carl Garner Federal Lands Cleanup Day
  - § 701. Findings
  - § 702. Definition
  - § 703. Duties of Federal land management agency
  - § 704. Activities
- Chapter 9: Miscellaneous
  - § 901. Service flag and service lapel button
  - § 902. National League of Families
  - § 903. Designation of Medal of Honor Flag
  - § 904. Hostage and Wrongful Detainee Flag

==== Part B: United States Government Organizations Involved with Observances and Ceremonies ====
- Chapter 21: American Battle Monuments Commission
  - §. 2101. Membership
  - §. 2102. Employment of personnel
  - §. 2103. Administrative
  - §. 2104. Military cemeteries in foreign countries
  - §. 2105. Monuments built by the United States Government
  - §. 2106. War memorials not built by the United States Government
  - §. 2107. National Memorial Cemetery of the Pacific
  - §. 2108. Pacific War Memorial and other historical and memorial sites on Corregidor
  - §. 2109. Foreign Currency Fluctuations Account
  - §. 2110. Claims against the Commission
  - §. 2111. Presidential duties and powers
  - §. 2112. Care and maintenance of Surrender Tree site
  - §. 2113. World War II memorial in the District of Columbia
  - §. 2114. Intellectual property and related items
  - §. 2115. Acquisition, operation, and maintenance of Lafayette Escadrille Memorial
- Chapter 23: United States Holocaust Memorial Museum
  - §. 2301. Establishment of the United States Holocaust Memorial Museum; functions
  - §. 2302. Functions of the Council; membership
  - §. 2303. Compensation; travel expenses; full-time officers or employees of United States or Members of Congress
  - §. 2304. Administrative provisions
  - §. 2305. Staff
  - §. 2306. Insurance for Museum
  - §. 2307. Gifts, bequests, and devises of property; tax treatment
  - §. 2308. Annual report
  - §. 2309. Audit of financial transactions
  - §. 2310. Authorization of appropriations
- Chapter 25: President's Committee on Employment of People with Disabilities
  - §. 2501. Acceptance of voluntary services and money or property
  - §. 2502. Authorization of appropriations

=== Subtitle II: Patriotic and National Organizations ===
==== Part A: General ====
- Chapter 101: General
  - §. 10101. Audits
  - §. 10102. Reservation of right to amend or repeal

==== Part B: Organizations ====
- Chapter 201: Agricultural Hall of Fame
- Chapter 202: Air Force Sergeants Association
- Chapter 203: American Academy of Arts and Letters
- Chapter 205: American Chemical Society
- Chapter 207: American Council of Learned Societies
- Chapter 209: American Ex-Prisoners of War
- Chapter 210: American GI Forum of the United States
- Chapter 211: American Gold Star Mothers, Incorporated
- Chapter 213: American Historical Association
- Chapter 215: American Hospital of Paris
- Chapter 217: The American Legion
- Chapter 219: The American National Theater and Academy
- Chapter 221: The American Society of International Law
- Chapter 223: American Symphony Orchestra League
- Chapter 225: American War Mothers
- Chapter 227: AMVETS (American Veterans of World War II, Korea, and Vietnam)
- Chapter 229: Army and Navy Union of the United States of America
- Chapter 231: Aviation Hall of Fame
- Chapter 301: Big Brothers Big Sisters of America
- Chapter 303: Blinded Veterans Association
- Chapter 305: Blue Star Mothers of America, Inc.
- Chapter 307: Board for Fundamental Education
- Chapter 309: Boy Scouts of America
- Chapter 311: Boys & Girls Clubs of America
- Chapter 401: Catholic War Veterans of the United States of America, Incorporated
- Chapter 403: Civil Air Patrol
- Chapter 405: Congressional Medal of Honor Society of the United States of America
- Chapter 407: Corporation for the Promotion of Rifle Practice and Firearms Safety
- Chapter 501: Daughters of Union Veterans of the Civil War 1861-1865
- Chapter 503: Disabled American Veterans
- Chapter 601: 82nd Airborne Division Association, Incorporated (see 82d Airborne Division)
- Chapter 701: Fleet Reserve Association
- Chapter 703: Former Members of Congress
- Chapter 705: The Foundation of the Federal Bar Association (See Federal Bar Association)
- Chapter 707: Frederick Douglass Memorial and Historical Association (See Frederick Douglass National Historic Site)
- Chapter 709: National FFA Organization
- Chapter 801: General Federation of Women's Clubs
- Chapter 803: Girl Scouts of the United States of America
- Chapter 805: Gold Star Wives of America
- Chapter 901: Reserved
- Chapter 1001: Italian American War Veterans of the United States
- Chapter 1101: Jewish War Veterans of the United States of America, Incorporated
- Chapter 1103: Jewish War Veterans, U.S.A., National Memorial, Incorporated
- Chapter 1201: Reserved
- Chapter 1301: Ladies of the Grand Army of the Republic (See Grand Army of the Republic)
- Chapter 1303: Legion of Valor of the United States of America, Incorporated
- Chapter 1305: Little League Baseball, Incorporated
- Chapter 1401: Marine Corps League
- Chapter 1403: The Military Chaplains Association of the United States of America
- Chapter 1404: Military Officers Association of America
- Chapter 1405: Military Order of the Purple Heart of the United States of America, Incorporated (See Purple Heart)
- Chapter 1407: Military Order of the World Wars
- Chapter 1501: National Academy of Public Administration
- Chapter 1503: National Academy of Sciences
- Chapter 1505: National Conference of State Societies, Washington, District of Columbia
- Chapter 1507: National Conference On Citizenship
- Chapter 1509: National Council On Radiation Protection and Measurements
- Chapter 1511: National Education Association of the United States
- Chapter 1513: National Fallen Firefighters Foundation (See National Fallen Firefighters Memorial))
- Chapter 1515: National Federation of Music Clubs
- Chapter 1517: National Film Preservation Foundation
- Chapter 1519: National Fund for Medical Education
- Chapter 1521: National Mining Hall of Fame and Museum
- Chapter 1523: National Music Council
- Chapter 1524: National Recording Preservation Foundation (See National Recording Preservation Board)
- Chapter 1525: National Safety Council
- Chapter 1527: National Ski Patrol System, Incorporated
- Chapter 1529: National Society, Daughters of the American Colonists
- Chapter 1531: The National Society of the Daughters of the American Revolution
- Chapter 1533: National Society of the Sons of the American Revolution
- Chapter 1535: National Tropical Botanical Garden
- Chapter 1537: National Woman's Relief Corps, Auxiliary to the Grand Army of the Republic
- Chapter 1539: The National Yeomen F (see Yeoman (F))
- Chapter 1541: Naval Sea Cadet Corps
- Chapter 1543: Navy Club of the United States of America
- Chapter 1545: Navy Wives Clubs of America
- Chapter 1547: Non Commissioned Officers Association of the United States of America, Incorporated
- Chapter 1601: Reserved
- Chapter 1701: Paralyzed Veterans of America
- Chapter 1703: Pearl Harbor Survivors Association
- Chapter 1705: Polish Legion of American Veterans, U.S.A.
- Chapter 1801: Reserved
- Chapter 1901: Reserve Officers Association of the United States
- Chapter 1903: Retired Enlisted Association, Incorporated
- Chapter 2001: Society of American Florists and Ornamental Horticulturists
- Chapter 2003: Sons of Union Veterans of the Civil War
- Chapter 2101: Theodore Roosevelt Association
- Chapter 2103: 369th Veterans' Association
- Chapter 2201: United Service Organizations, Incorporated
- Chapter 2203: United States Capitol Historical Society
- Chapter 2205: United States Olympic Committee
- Chapter 2207: United States Submarine Veterans of World War II
- Chapter 2301: Veterans of Foreign Wars of the United States
- Chapter 2303: Veterans of World War I of the United States of America, Incorporated
- Chapter 2305: Vietnam Veterans of America, Inc.
- Chapter 2401: Women's Army Corps Veterans' Association
- Chapter 2501: Reserved
- Chapter 2601: Reserved
- Chapter 2701: Reserved

=== Subtitle III: Treaty Obligation Organizations ===
- Chapter 3001: The American National Red Cross

== See also ==
- Congressional charter
- Public holidays in the United States
