= December 17 =

December 17 this year in various calendars
- Thursday, 17 December 2026
Akan	Kwayaw
Armenian	30 Kʿaloch 1476
Aztec	Tozoztontli 16, 4 Ātl
Babylonian	7 Kislimu, 2337 SE
Balinese pawukon	Luang, Pepet, Beteng, Jaya, Pon, Was, Wraspati of Wariga, Kala, Tulus, Manuh
Bengali	2 Poush, BS 1433
Chinese	Yin Wood Ox・Dipper Mansion; Fire Horse Year, Month 11, Day 9 (Daxue, 5 days until Dongzhi)
Common Era	17 December 2026 CE
Coptic	8 Koiak, AM 1743
Egyptian	5 Pachon, 2775 NE
Ethiopian	8 Tākḫśāś, 2019 Amätä Məhrät
French Republican	Décade III, Sextidi de Frimaire de l'Année 235 de la République
Gregorian	17 December, AD 2026
Hebrew	7 Tevet, AM 5787
Hindu	Pūrvabhādrapada・Siddhi; Solar: 2 Pauṣa, 1948 SE; Lunisolar: Aṣṭamī, Śukla pakṣa of Mārgaśīrṣa, 2083 VE; Rāudra・5127 KY・1,872,926
Icelandic	Fimmtudagur, 25 Ýlir 2026
Islamic	7 Rajab, AH 1448 (using tabular method)
ISO week date	2026-W51-4
Japanese	9 Shimotsuki, Reiwa 8 (Taisetsu, 5 days until Tōji)
Julian	4 December, AD 2026 (AM 7535)
Julian day	2461392
Korean	9 Jwidal, 4359 DE
Maya	13.0.14.3.9; 2 Kankin, 4 Muluc
Roman	Pridie Nonas Decembres, MMDCCLXXIX AUC
Solar Hijri	26 Azar, SH 1405
Tibetan	8 mgo, me pho rta 2153 or 1772 or 1000

<<	December					>>
Su	Mo	Tu	We	Th	Fr	Sa
		1	2	3	4	5
6	7	8	9	10	11	12
13	14	15	16	17	18	19
20	21	22	23	24	25	26
27	28	29	30	31
2026

December 17 in recent years
2025 (Wednesday)
2024 (Tuesday)
2023 (Sunday)
2022 (Saturday)
2021 (Friday)
2020 (Thursday)
2019 (Tuesday)
2018 (Monday)
2017 (Sunday)
2016 (Saturday)

December 17 is the 351st day of the year (352nd in leap years) in the Gregorian calendar; 14 days remain until the end of the year.

== Events ==
=== Pre-1600 ===
- 497 BC – The first Saturnalia festival is celebrated in ancient Rome.
- 546 – Siege of Rome: The Ostrogoths under king Totila plunder the city, by bribing the Eastern Roman garrison.
- 920 – Romanos I Lekapenos is crowned co-emperor of the underage Constantine VII.
- 942 – Assassination of William Longsword, Count of Normandy.
- 1297 – King Kyawswa of Pagan is overthrown by the three Myinsaing brothers, marking the de facto end of the Pagan Kingdom.
- 1354 – Margaret II, Countess of Hainaut and Holy Roman Empress and her son William I, Duke of Bavaria, sign a peace treaty ending the Hook and Cod wars.
- 1398 – Sultan Nasir-u Din Mehmud's armies in Delhi are defeated by Timur.
- 1538 – Pope Paul III excommunicates Henry VIII of England.
- 1583 – Cologne War: Forces under Ernest of Bavaria defeat troops under Gebhard Truchsess von Waldburg at the Siege of Godesberg.
- 1586 – Go-Yōzei becomes Emperor of Japan.

=== 1601–1900 ===
- 1665 – The first account of a blood transfusion is published, in the form of a letter from physician Richard Lower to chemist Robert Boyle, in Philosophical Transactions of the Royal Society
- 1718 – War of the Quadruple Alliance: Great Britain declares war on Spain.
- 1777 – American Revolution: France formally recognizes the United States.
- 1790 – The Aztec calendar stone is discovered at El Zócalo, Mexico City.
- 1807 – Napoleonic Wars: France issues the Milan Decree, which confirms the Continental System.
- 1812 – War of 1812: U.S. forces attack a Lenape village in the Battle of the Mississinewa.
- 1819 – Simón Bolívar declares the independence of Gran Colombia in Angostura (now Ciudad Bolívar in Venezuela).
- 1835 – The second Great Fire of New York destroys 53,000 square metres (13 acres) of New York City's Financial District.
- 1837 – A fire in the Winter Palace of Saint Petersburg kills 30 guards.
- 1862 – American Civil War: General Ulysses S. Grant issues General Order No. 11, expelling Jews from parts of Tennessee, Mississippi, and Kentucky.
- 1865 – First performance of the Unfinished Symphony by Franz Schubert.
- 1892 – First issue of Vogue is published.
- 1896 – Pittsburgh, Pennsylvania's Schenley Park Casino, which was the first multi-purpose arena with the technology to create an artificial ice surface in North America, is destroyed in a fire.

=== 1901–present ===
- 1903 – The Wright brothers make the first controlled powered, heavier-than-air flight in the Wright Flyer at Kitty Hawk, North Carolina.
- 1907 – Ugyen Wangchuck is crowned first King of Bhutan.
- 1918 – Darwin Rebellion: Up to 1,000 demonstrators march on Government House in Darwin, Northern Territory, Australia.
- 1926 – Antanas Smetona assumes power in Lithuania as the 1926 coup d'état is successful.
- 1927 – Indian revolutionary Rajendra Lahiri is hanged in Gonda jail, Uttar Pradesh, India, two days before the scheduled date.
- 1928 – Indian revolutionaries Bhagat Singh, Sukhdev Thapar and Shivaram Rajguru assassinate British police officer James Saunders in Lahore, Punjab, to avenge the death of Lala Lajpat Rai at the hands of the police. The three were executed in 1931.
- 1933 – The first NFL Championship Game is played at Wrigley Field in Chicago between the New York Giants and Chicago Bears. The Bears win 23–21.
- 1935 – Douglas DC-3: The twin-engine airliner makes its maiden flight from Santa Monica.
- 1938 – Otto Hahn discovers the nuclear fission of the heavy element uranium, the scientific and technological basis of nuclear energy.
- 1939 – World War II: Battle of the River Plate: The Admiral Graf Spee is scuttled by Captain Hans Langsdorff outside Montevideo.
- 1943 – All Chinese are again permitted to become citizens of the United States upon the repeal of the Act of 1882 and the introduction of the Magnuson Act.
- 1944 – World War II: Battle of the Bulge: Malmedy massacre: American 285th Field Artillery Observation Battalion POWs are shot by Waffen-SS Kampfgruppe Joachim Peiper.
- 1945 – Kurdistan flag day, the flag of Kurdistan is raised for the first time in Mahabad in eastern Kurdistan.
- 1947 – First flight of the Boeing B-47 Stratojet strategic bomber.
- 1948 – The Finnish Security Police is established to remove communist leadership from its predecessor, the State Police.
- 1950 – The F-86 Sabre's first mission over Korea.
- 1951 – The American Civil Rights Congress delivers "We Charge Genocide" to the United Nations.
- 1957 – The United States successfully launches the first Atlas intercontinental ballistic missile at Cape Canaveral, Florida.
- 1960 – Troops loyal to Emperor Haile Selassie in Ethiopia crush the coup that began December 13, returning power to their leader upon his return from Brazil. Haile Selassie absolves his son of any guilt.
- 1960 – Munich C-131 crash: Twenty passengers and crew on board as well as 32 people on the ground are killed.
- 1961 – Niterói circus fire: Fire breaks out during a performance by the Gran Circus Norte-Americano in the city of Niterói, Rio de Janeiro, Brazil, killing more than 500.
- 1967 – Harold Holt, Prime Minister of Australia, disappears while swimming near Portsea, Victoria, and is presumed drowned.
- 1969 – Project Blue Book: The United States Air Force closes its study of UFOs.
- 1970 – Polish protests: In Gdynia, soldiers fire at workers emerging from trains, killing dozens.
- 1973 – Thirty passengers are killed in an attack by Palestinian terrorists on Rome's Leonardo da Vinci–Fiumicino Airport.
- 1981 – American Brigadier General James L. Dozier is abducted by the Red Brigades in Verona, Italy.
- 1983 – Provisional IRA members detonate a car bomb at Harrods Department Store in London. Three police officers and three civilians are killed.
- 1989 – Romanian Revolution: Protests continue in Timișoara, Romania, with rioters breaking into the Romanian Communist Party's District Committee building and attempting to set it on fire.
- 1989 – Fernando Collor de Mello defeats Luiz Inácio Lula da Silva in the second round of the Brazilian presidential election, becoming the first democratically elected President in almost 30 years.
- 1989 – The Simpsons premieres on television with the episode "Simpsons Roasting on an Open Fire".
- 1997 – Peruvian internal conflict: Fourteen members of the Túpac Amaru Revolutionary Movement provoke a hostage crisis by taking over the Japanese embassy in Lima.
- 1997 – Aerosvit Flight 241: A Yakovlev Yak-42 crashes into the Pierian Mountains near Thessaloniki Airport in Thessaloniki, Greece, killing all 70 people on board.
- 2002 – Second Congo War: The Congolese parties of the Inter Congolese Dialogue sign a peace accord which makes provision for transitional governance and legislative and presidential elections within two years.
- 2003 – The Soham murder trial ends at the Old Bailey in London, with Ian Huntley found guilty of two counts of murder. His girlfriend, Maxine Carr, is found guilty of perverting the course of justice.
- 2003 – SpaceShipOne, piloted by Brian Binnie, makes its first powered and first supersonic flight.
- 2003 – Sex work rights activists establish December 17 (or "D17") as International Day to End Violence Against Sex Workers to memorialize victims of a serial killer who targeted prostitutes, and highlight State violence against sex workers by police and others.
- 2005 – Anti-World Trade Organization protesters riot in Wan Chai, Hong Kong.
- 2005 – Jigme Singye Wangchuck abdicates the throne as King of Bhutan.
- 2009 – MV Danny F II sinks off the coast of Lebanon, resulting in the deaths of 44 people and over 28,000 animals.
- 2010 – Mohamed Bouazizi sets himself on fire. This act became the catalyst for the Tunisian Revolution and the wider Arab Spring.
- 2014 – The United States and Cuba re-establish diplomatic relations after severing them in 1961.

== Births ==
=== Pre-1600 ===
- 1239 – Kujō Yoritsugu, Japanese shōgun (died 1256)
- 1267 – Emperor Go-Uda of Japan (died 1324)
- 1554 – Ernest of Bavaria, Roman Catholic bishop (died 1612)
- 1556 – Abdul Rahim Khan-I-Khana, poet in Mughal Empire (died 1627)
- 1574 – Pedro Téllez-Girón, 3rd Duke of Osuna, Spanish nobleman and politician (died 1624)

=== 1601–1900 ===
- 1616 – Roger L'Estrange, English pamphleteer and author (died 1704)
- 1619 – Prince Rupert of the Rhine (died 1682)
- 1632 – Anthony Wood, English historian and author (died 1695)
- 1685 – Thomas Tickell, English poet (died 1740)
- 1699 – Charles-Louis Mion, French composer and educator (died 1775)
- 1706 – Émilie du Châtelet, French mathematician and physicist (died 1749)
- 1734 – Maria I of Portugal (died 1816)
- 1749 – Domenico Cimarosa, Italian composer and educator (died 1801)
- 1778 – Humphry Davy, English chemist and physicist (died 1829)
- 1796 – Thomas Chandler Haliburton, Canadian judge and politician (died 1865)
- 1797 – Joseph Henry, American physicist and engineer (died 1878)
- 1798 – Wilhelmine von Wrochem, German flutist, singer and actress (died 1839)
- 1807 – John Greenleaf Whittier, American poet and activist (died 1892)
- 1812 – Vilhelm Petersen, Danish painter (died 1880)
- 1827 – Alexander Wassilko von Serecki, Austrian lawyer and politician (died 1893)
- 1830 – Jules de Goncourt, French author and critic (died 1870)
- 1835 – Alexander Emanuel Agassiz, Swiss-American ichthyologist and engineer (died 1910)
- 1840 – Nozu Michitsura, Japanese field marshal (died 1908)
- 1842 – Sophus Lie, Norwegian mathematician and academic (died 1899)
- 1847 – Émile Faguet, French author and critic (died 1916)
- 1853 – Pierre Paul Émile Roux, French physician and immunologist, co-founded the Pasteur Institute (died 1933)
- 1858 – Eva Nansen, Norwegian mezzo-soprano singer and pioneer on women's skiing (died 1907)
- 1859 – Paul César Helleu, French painter and illustrator (died 1927)
- 1866 – Kazys Grinius, Lithuanian physician and politician, third President of Lithuania (died 1950)
- 1873 – Ford Madox Ford, English novelist, poet, and critic (died 1939)
- 1874 – William Lyon Mackenzie King, Canadian economist and politician, tenth Prime Minister of Canada (died 1950)
- 1881 – Aubrey Faulkner, South African-English cricketer and coach (died 1930)
- 1884 – Alison Uttley, English children's book writer (died 1976)
- 1887 – Josef Lada, Czech painter and illustrator (died 1957)
- 1890 – Prince Joachim of Prussia (died 1920)
- 1892 – Sam Barry, American basketball player and coach (died 1950)
- 1893 – Charles C. Banks, English captain and pilot (died 1971)
- 1893 – Erwin Piscator, German director and producer (died 1966)
- 1894 – Arthur Fiedler, American conductor (died 1979)
- 1894 – Patrick Flynn, Irish-American runner and soldier (died 1969)
- 1894 – Wim Schermerhorn, Dutch cartographer, engineer, and politician, Prime Minister of the Netherlands (died 1977)
- 1895 – Gerald Patterson, Australian tennis player (died 1967)
- 1898 – Loren Murchison, American sprinter (died 1979)
- 1900 – Mary Cartwright, English mathematician and academic, one of the first people to analyze a dynamical system with chaos (died 1998)

=== 1901–present ===
- 1903 – Erskine Caldwell, American novelist and short story writer (died 1987)
- 1903 – Ray Noble, English bandleader, composer, and actor (died 1978)
- 1904 – Paul Cadmus, American painter and illustrator (died 1999)
- 1905 – Simo Häyhä, Finnish soldier and sniper (died 2002)
- 1905 – Mohammad Hidayatullah, 11th Chief Justice of India, and politician, sixth Vice President of India (died 1992)
- 1905 – Erico Verissimo, Brazilian author and translator (died 1975)
- 1906 – Fernando Lopes-Graça, Portuguese composer and conductor (died 1994)
- 1906 – Russell C. Newhouse, American pilot and engineer (died 1998)
- 1908 – Willard Libby, American chemist and academic, Nobel Prize laureate (died 1980)
- 1910 – Eknath Easwaran, Indian-American educator and author (died 1999)
- 1910 – Sy Oliver, American singer-songwriter and trumpet player (died 1988)
- 1912 – Edward Short, Baron Glenamara, English captain and politician, Lord President of the Council (died 2012)
- 1913 – Burt Baskin, American businessman, co-founded Baskin-Robbins (died 1967)
- 1914 – Mushtaq Ali, Indian cricketer (died 2005)
- 1914 – Fernando Alonso, Cuban ballet dancer, co-founded the Cuban National Ballet (died 2013)
- 1916 – Penelope Fitzgerald, English author and poet (died 2000)
- 1917 – Kenneth Dike, Nigerian historian, author, and academic (died 1983)
- 1920 – Kenneth E. Iverson, Canadian computer scientist, developed the APL programming language (died 2004)
- 1921 – Lore Berger, German-Swiss author and translator (died 1943)
- 1922 – Alan Voorhees, American engineer and academic (died 2005)
- 1923 – Jaroslav Pelikan, American historian and scholar (died 2006)
- 1925 – Calvin Tomkins, American author and art critic (died 2026)
- 1926 – Ray Jablonski, American baseball player (died 1985)
- 1926 – John Hans Krebs, American lawyer and politician (died 2014)
- 1926 – Stephen Lewis, English actor, director, screenwriter, and playwright (died 2015)
- 1927 – Richard Long, American actor and director (died 1974)
- 1927 – Edward Meneeley, American painter and sculptor (died 2012)
- 1928 – Marilyn Beck, American journalist (died 2014)
- 1928 – Eli Beeding, American captain and pilot (died 2013)
- 1928 – Doyle Conner, American farmer and politician, seventh Florida Commissioner of Agriculture (died 2012)
- 1929 – William Safire, American journalist and author (died 2009)
- 1930 – Bob Guccione, American photographer and publisher, founded Penthouse (died 2010)
- 1930 – Armin Mueller-Stahl, German actor and painter
- 1930 – Dorothy Rowe, Australian psychologist and author (died 2019)
- 1931 – Gerald Finnerman, American director and cinematographer (died 2011)
- 1931 – Dave Madden, Canadian-American actor (died 2014)
- 1931 – James McGaugh, American neurobiologist and psychologist
- 1932 – John Bond, English footballer and manager (died 2012)
- 1934 – Irving Petlin, American painter and academic (died 2018)
- 1934 – Ray Wilson, English footballer and manager (died 2018)
- 1935 – Brian Langford, English cricketer (died 2013)
- 1935 – Cal Ripken Sr., American baseball player, coach, and manager (died 1999)
- 1936 – Pope Francis, Argentinian Pope of the Catholic Church (died 2025)
- 1936 – Tommy Steele, English singer, guitarist, and actor
- 1937 – Brian Hayes, Australian-English radio host (died 2025)
- 1937 – Art Neville, American singer and keyboard player (died 2019)
- 1937 – Kerry Packer, Australian businessman, founded World Series Cricket (died 2005)
- 1937 – John Kennedy Toole, American novelist (died 1969)
- 1937 – Calvin Waller, American general (died 1996)
- 1938 – Peter Snell, New Zealand runner (died 2019)
- 1939 – James Booker, American pianist (died 1983)
- 1939 – Eddie Kendricks, American R&B singer-songwriter (died 1992)
- 1940 – Kåre Valebrokk, Norwegian journalist (died 2013)
- 1940 – María Elena Velasco, Mexican actress, singer, director, and screenwriter (died 2015)
- 1941 – Dave Dee, English singer-songwriter and guitarist (died 2009)
- 1941 – Stan Mudenge, Zimbabwean historian and politician, Zimbabwean Minister of Foreign Affairs (died 2012)
- 1942 – Muhammadu Buhari, Nigerian general and politician, 7th & 15th President of Nigeria (died 2025)
- 1942 – Paul Butterfield, American singer and harmonica player (died 1987)
- 1943 – Ron Geesin, Scottish pianist and composer
- 1944 – Jack L. Chalker, American author and educator (died 2005)
- 1944 – Carlo M. Croce, Italian-American oncologist and academic
- 1944 – Bernard Hill, English actor (died 2024)
- 1945 – Ernie Hudson, American actor
- 1945 – David Mallet, English director
- 1945 – Chris Matthews, American journalist and author
- 1945 – Jüri Talvet, Estonian poet and critic
- 1945 – Jacqueline Wilson, English author and academic
- 1946 – Simon Bates, English radio host
- 1946 – Eugene Levy, Canadian actor, director, and screenwriter
- 1947 – Wes Studi, American actor and producer
- 1948 – Valery Belousov, Russian ice hockey player and coach (died 2015)
- 1948 – Jim Bonfanti, American rock drummer
- 1948 – Kemal Kılıçdaroğlu, Turkish economist and politician
- 1949 – Joel Brooks, American actor
- 1949 – Sotiris Kaiafas, Cypriot footballer
- 1949 – Paul Rodgers, English singer-songwriter and producer
- 1950 – Laurence F. Johnson, American educator and author
- 1950 – Maurice Peoples, American sprinter and coach
- 1951 – Pat Hill, American football player and coach
- 1951 – Ken Hitchcock, Canadian ice hockey player and coach
- 1951 – Tatyana Kazankina, Russian runner
- 1953 – Bill Pullman, American actor
- 1954 – Sergejus Jovaiša, Lithuanian basketball player
- 1955 – Brad Davis, American basketball player, coach, and sportscaster
- 1956 – Peter Farrelly, American director, producer, and screenwriter
- 1956 – Dominic Lawson, English journalist and author
- 1956 – Totka Petrova, Bulgarian runner
- 1957 – Wendy Hoyte, English sprinter
- 1957 – Bob Ojeda, American baseball player and coach
- 1958 – Mike Mills, American bass player, songwriter, and producer
- 1958 – Donald Payne Jr., American politician (died 2024)
- 1959 – Bob Stinson, American songwriter and guitarist (died 1995)
- 1961 – Mansoor al-Jamri, Bahraini journalist and author
- 1961 – Sara Dallin, English singer
- 1962 – Paul Dobson, English footballer
- 1962 – Galina Malchugina, Russian sprinter
- 1962 – Rocco Mediate, American golfer and journalist
- 1964 – Frank Musil, Czech ice hockey player and coach
- 1964 – Joe Wolf, American basketball player and coach (died 2024)
- 1965 – Craig Berube, Canadian ice hockey player and coach
- 1965 – Jeff Grayer, American basketball player and coach
- 1966 – Tracy Byrd, American singer-songwriter and guitarist
- 1966 – Kristiina Ojuland, Estonian politician, 23rd Estonian Minister of Foreign Affairs
- 1967 – Vincent Damphousse, Canadian ice hockey player and sportscaster
- 1967 – Gigi D'Agostino, Italian musician, singer and DJ.
- 1967 – Karsten Neitzel, German footballer and manager
- 1968 – Claudio Suárez, Mexican footballer
- 1968 – Paul Tracy, Canadian race car driver and sportscaster
- 1969 – Laurie Holden, American actress and model
- 1969 – Inna Lasovskaya, Russian triple jumper
- 1969 – Chuck Liddell, American mixed martial artist and kick-boxer
- 1969 – Mick Quinn, English singer-songwriter, guitarist and producer
- 1970 – Sean Patrick Thomas, American actor
- 1971 – Claire Forlani, English actress
- 1971 – Alan Khan, South African radio and TV presenter
- 1971 – Nikki McCray-Penson, American basketball player and coach (died 2023)
- 1971 – Antoine Rigaudeau, French basketball player
- 1972 – John Abraham, Indian actor and producer
- 1972 – Iván Pedroso, Cuban long jumper and coach
- 1973 – Eddie Fisher, American drummer
- 1973 – Konstadinos Gatsioudis, Greek javelin thrower
- 1973 – Rian Johnson, American director, producer, and screenwriter
- 1973 – Paula Radcliffe, English runner
- 1973 – Hasan Vural, German-Turkish footballer
- 1974 – Charl Langeveldt, South African cricketer
- 1974 – Sarah Paulson, American actress
- 1974 – Giovanni Ribisi, American actor
- 1974 – Marissa Ribisi, American actress
- 1975 – Nick Dinsmore, American wrestler and trainer
- 1975 – Susanthika Jayasinghe, Sri Lankan sprinter
- 1975 – Milla Jovovich, Ukrainian-American actress
- 1976 – Éric Bédard, Canadian speed skater and coach
- 1976 – Nir Davidovich, Israeli footballer and manager
- 1976 – Patrick Müller, Swiss footballer
- 1976 – Andrew Simpson, English sailor (died 2013)
- 1976 – Takeo Spikes, American football player and sportscaster
- 1977 – Arnaud Clément, French tennis player
- 1977 – Samuel Påhlsson, Swedish ice hockey player
- 1977 – Katheryn Winnick, Canadian actress
- 1978 – Alex Cintrón, Puerto Rican baseball player and sportscaster
- 1978 – Riteish Deshmukh, Indian film actor, producer and architect
- 1978 – Manny Pacquiao, Filipino boxer and politician
- 1978 – Neil Sanderson, Canadian drummer and songwriter
- 1978 – Chase Utley, American baseball player
- 1979 – Matt Murley, American ice hockey player
- 1979 – Paul Smith, English footballer
- 1980 – Suzy Batkovic, Australian basketball player
- 1980 – Ryan Hunter-Reay, American race car driver
- 1980 – Alexandra Papageorgiou, Greek hammer thrower
- 1980 – Eli Pariser, American activist and author
- 1981 – Jerry Hsu, American skateboarder and photographer
- 1981 – Tim Wiese, German footballer
- 1982 – Josh Barfield, American baseball player
- 1982 – Lorenzo Cittadini, Italian rugby player
- 1982 – Craig Kielburger, Canadian activist and author
- 1982 – Stéphane Lasme, Gabonese basketball player
- 1983 – Gregory Campbell, Canadian ice hockey player and executive
- 1983 – Erik Christensen, Canadian ice hockey player
- 1983 – Mikky Ekko, American singer and songwriter
- 1983 – Haron Keitany, Kenyan runner
- 1983 – Sébastien Ogier, French race car driver
- 1984 – Luis Alfageme, Argentinian footballer
- 1984 – Julian Bennett, English footballer
- 1984 – Andrew Davies, English footballer
- 1984 – Shannon Woodward, American actress
- 1985 – Fernando Abad, Dominican baseball player
- 1985 – Łukasz Broź, Polish footballer
- 1985 – Craig Reid, English footballer
- 1986 – Emma Bell, American actress
- 1986 – Frei Gilson, Brazilian Catholic priest and singer
- 1986 – Frank Winterstein, Australian-Samoan rugby league player
- 1986 – Vanessa Zima, American actress
- 1987 – Maryna Arzamasova, Belarusian middle-distance runner
- 1987 – Bo Guagua, Chinese businessman
- 1987 – Chelsea Manning, American soldier and intelligence analyst
- 1987 – Donovan Solano, Colombian baseball player
- 1988 – Liisa Ehrberg, Estonian cyclist
- 1988 – Grethe Grünberg, Estonian ice dancer
- 1988 – Kris Joseph, Canadian basketball player
- 1988 – David Rudisha, Kenyan runner
- 1988 – Yann Sommer, Swiss footballer
- 1988 – Craig Sutherland, Scottish footballer
- 1989 – André Ayew, Ghanaian footballer
- 1989 – Taylor York, American musician
- 1990 – Graham Rogers, American actor
- 1991 – Jordan Rankin, Australian rugby league player
- 1991 – Atsedu Tsegay, Ethiopian runner
- 1992 – Quinton de Kock, South African cricketer
- 1992 – Buddy Hield, Bahamian basketball player
- 1992 – Joshua Ingram, Canadian drummer and percussionist
- 1993 – Kiersey Clemons, American actress
- 1993 – Patricia Kú Flores, Peruvian tennis player
- 1994 – Lloyd Perrett, New Zealand rugby league player
- 1994 – Nat Wolff, American singer-songwriter, keyboard player and actor
- 1995 – Guerschon Yabusele, French basketball player
- 1996 – Elizaveta Tuktamysheva, Russian figure skater
- 1997 – Naiktha Bains, British-Australian tennis player
- 1997 – Shoma Uno, Japanese figure skater
- 1998 – Jasmine Armfield, English actress
- 1998 – Martin Ødegaard, Norwegian footballer
- 1999 – Holly Humberstone, English singer-songwriter
- 1999 – Mirei Sasaki, Japanese singer, model, and actress
- 2000 – Wesley Fofana, French footballer
- 2002 – Castello Lukeba, French footballer

== Deaths ==
=== Pre-1600 ===
- 779 – Sturm, abbot of Fulda
- 908 – al-Abbas ibn al-Hasan al-Jarjara'i, Abbasid vizier
- 908 – Abdallah ibn al-Mu'tazz, Abbasid prince and poet, anti-caliph for one day
- 942 – William I, duke of Normandy
- 1187 – Pope Gregory VIII (born 1100)
- 1195 – Count Baldwin V of Hainaut (born 1150)
- 1273 – Rumi, Persian jurist, theologian, and poet (born 1207)
- 1316 – Juan Fernández, bishop-elect of León
- 1419 – William Gascoigne, Chief Justice of England
- 1471 – Infanta Isabel, Duchess of Burgundy (born 1397)
- 1559 – Irene di Spilimbergo, Italian Renaissance poet and painter (born 1538)
- 1562 – Eleonora di Toledo, Grand Duchess of Tuscany (born 1522)

=== 1601–1900 ===
- 1663 – Nzinga of Ndongo and Matamba (born 1583)
- 1721 – Richard Lumley, 1st Earl of Scarbrough, English soldier and politician, Chancellor of the Duchy of Lancaster (born 1640)
- 1830 – Simón Bolívar, Venezuelan general and politician, second President of Venezuela (born 1783)
- 1833 – Kaspar Hauser, German feral child (born 1812?)
- 1847 – Marie Louise, Duchess of Parma (born 1791)
- 1857 – Francis Beaufort, Irish hydrographer and officer in the Royal Navy (born 1774)
- 1891 – José María Iglesias, Mexican politician and interim President (1876–1877) (born 1823)

=== 1901–present ===
- 1904 – William Shiels, Irish-Australian politician, 16th Premier of Victoria (born 1848)
- 1907 – William Thomson, 1st Baron Kelvin, Irish-Scottish physicist and engineer (born 1824)
- 1909 – Leopold II of Belgium (born 1835)
- 1917 – Elizabeth Garrett Anderson, English physician and activist (born 1836)
- 1927 – Rajendra Lahiri, Indian activist (born 1892)
- 1928 – Frank Rinehart, American photographer (born 1861)
- 1929 – Manuel de Oliveira Gomes da Costa, Portuguese general and politician, tenth President of Portugal (born 1863)
- 1930 – Peter Warlock, Welsh composer and critic (born 1894)
- 1932 – Charles Winckler, Danish discus thrower, shot putter, and tug of war competitor (born 1867)
- 1933 – 13th Dalai Lama (born 1876)
- 1935 – Lizette Woodworth Reese, American poet (born 1856)
- 1940 – Alicia Boole Stott, Anglo-Irish mathematician and academic (born 1860)
- 1942 – Allen Bathurst, Lord Apsley, English lieutenant and politician (born 1895)
- 1947 – Christos Tsigiridis, Greek engineer (born 1877)
- 1956 – Eddie Acuff, American actor (born 1903)
- 1957 – Dorothy L. Sayers, English author, poet, and playwright (born 1893)
- 1962 – Thomas Mitchell, American actor (born 1892)
- 1964 – Victor Francis Hess, Austrian-American physicist and academic, Nobel Prize laureate (born 1883)
- 1967 – Harold Holt, Australian lawyer and politician, 17th Prime Minister of Australia (born 1908)
- 1970 – Oliver Waterman Larkin, American historian, author, and educator (born 1896)
- 1978 – Don Ellis, American trumpet player, composer, and bandleader (born 1934)
- 1981 – Antiochos Evangelatos, Greek composer and conductor (born 1903)
- 1982 – Homer S. Ferguson, American lawyer, judge, and politician (born 1889)
- 1986 – Guillermo Cano Isaza, Colombian journalist (born 1925)
- 1987 – Bernardus Johannes Alfrink, Dutch cardinal (born 1900)
- 1987 – Linda Wong, American porn actress (born 1951)
- 1987 – Marguerite Yourcenar, Belgian-American author and poet (born 1903)
- 1992 – Günther Anders, German journalist and philosopher (born 1902)
- 1992 – Dana Andrews, American actor (born 1909)
- 1999 – Rex Allen, American singer-songwriter and actor (born 1920)
- 1999 – Grover Washington Jr., American singer-songwriter and saxophonist (born 1943)
- 1999 – C. Vann Woodward, American historian and academic (born 1908)
- 2002 – K. W. Devanayagam, Sri Lankan lawyer and politician, tenth Sri Lankan Minister of Justice (born 1910)
- 2003 – Otto Graham, American football player and coach (born 1921)
- 2004 – Tom Wesselmann, American painter and sculptor (born 1931)
- 2005 – Jack Anderson, American journalist and author (born 1922)
- 2005 – Marc Favreau, Canadian actor and poet (born 1929)
- 2005 – Haljand Udam, Estonian orientalist and academic (born 1936)
- 2006 – Larry Sherry, American baseball player and coach (born 1935)
- 2008 – Sammy Baugh, American football player and coach (born 1914)
- 2008 – Freddy Breck, German singer-songwriter, producer, and journalist (born 1942)
- 2008 – Dave Smith, American baseball player and coach (born 1955)
- 2008 – Gregoire, Congolese chimpanzee, oldest recorded (born 1942)
- 2009 – Chris Henry, American football player (born 1983)
- 2009 – Jennifer Jones, American actress (born 1919)
- 2009 – Alaina Reed Hall, American actress (born 1946)
- 2010 – Captain Beefheart, American singer-songwriter (born 1941)
- 2010 – Walt Dropo, American basketball and baseball player (born 1923)
- 2010 – Ralph Coates, English footballer (born 1946)
- 2011 – Eva Ekvall, Venezuelan journalist and author, Miss Venezuela 2000 (born 1983)
- 2011 – Kim Jong-il, North Korean commander and politician, second Supreme Leader of North Korea (born 1941)
- 2012 – Richard Adams, Filipino-American activist (born 1947)
- 2012 – James Gower, American priest and activist, co-founded the College of the Atlantic (born 1922)
- 2012 – Daniel Inouye, American captain and politician (born 1924)
- 2012 – Laurier LaPierre, Canadian historian, journalist, and politician (born 1929)
- 2012 – Frank Pastore, American baseball player and radio host (born 1957)
- 2013 – Fred Bruemmer, Latvian-Canadian photographer (born 1929)
- 2013 – Ricardo María Carles Gordó, Spanish cardinal (born 1926)
- 2013 – Richard Heffner, American historian and television host (born 1925)
- 2013 – Tetsurō Kashibuchi, Japanese drummer, songwriter, and producer (born 1950)
- 2013 – Janet Rowley, American geneticist and biologist (born 1925)
- 2013 – Conny van Rietschoten, Dutch sailor (born 1926)
- 2014 – Dieter Grau, German-American scientist and engineer (born 1913)
- 2014 – Richard C. Hottelet, American journalist (born 1917)
- 2014 – Oleh Lysheha, Ukrainian poet and playwright (born 1949)
- 2014 – Lowell Steward, American captain (born 1919)
- 2014 – Ivan Vekić, Croatian colonel, lawyer, and politician, Croatian Minister of the Interior (born 1938)
- 2015 – Hal Brown, American baseball player and manager (born 1924)
- 2015 – Osamu Hayaishi, American-Japanese biochemist and academic (born 1920)
- 2015 – Michael Wyschogrod, German-American philosopher and theologian (born 1928)
- 2016 – Benjamin A. Gilman, American soldier and politician (born 1922)
- 2016 – Henry Heimlich, American doctor (born 1920)
- 2016 – Gordon Hunt, American voice director (born 1929)
- 2020 – Jeremy Bulloch, English actor (born 1945)
- 2020 – Allen Dines, American politician (born 1921)
- 2023 – Ronaldo Valdez, Filipino actor (born 1947)
- 2023 – James McCaffrey, American actor (born 1958)
- 2024 – Igor Kirillov, Russian general (born 1970)
- 2024 – Marisa Paredes, Spanish film actress (born 1946)
- 2025 – William Rush, English actor (born 1994)

== Holidays and observances ==
- Christian feast day:
  - Daniel the Prophet
  - Josep Manyanet i Vives
  - Lazarus of Bethany (local commemoration in Cuba)
  - O Sapientia
  - Olympias the Deaconess
  - Wivina
  - Sturm
  - December 17 (Eastern Orthodox liturgics)
- Accession Day (Bahrain)
- International Day to End Violence Against Sex Workers
- Kurdish Flag Day (Global Kurdish population)
- National Day (Bhutan)
- Pan American Aviation Day (United States)
- Wright Brothers Day, a United States federal observance by Presidential proclamation
