= Florida Department of Veterans Affairs =

Statewide regulatory entity in Florida

Florida Department of Veterans' Affairs
- Department of Veterans' Affairs logo

Agency overview
- Formed: 1989
- Headquarters: Tallahassee, Florida
- Annual budget: $110.8 million (2013-2014)
- Agency executives: James S. Hartsell, Executive Director
- Parent agency: Florida Cabinet
- Website: www.floridavets.org

The Florida Department of Veterans' Affairs (FDVA) is a government agency of the state of Florida under the authority of the Governor of Florida charged with helping veterans and their families to receive all benefits they are legally entitled to.

Florida first began assisting military veterans when they returned from World War II in 1944, but it wasn't until 1988 that a constitutional amendment was approved by Florida's voters to create a specific agency for that purpose. The Florida Department of Veterans' Affairs was created in 1989.

== Recent developments ==
The Florida Vets First program was implemented in 2008, providing information and contacts for housing, healthcare, employment & benefits to service men and women returning from deployment. Groundbreaking for the Jacksonville National Cemetery occurred on September 12, 2008. The facility opened for interments on January 7, 2009. The new $650 million Orlando VA Medical Center at Lake Nona broke ground on October 24, 2008.

Legislation was passed in 2009 that authorizes the Florida Commissioner of Education to award a Florida High School Diploma to honorably discharged Vietnam veterans who interrupted their high school education to serve their country.

On June 1, 2009, Florida Governor Charlie Crist and other dignitaries toured the Wounded Warrior Project headquarters in Jacksonville and signed Florida House Bill 509, which waived building and permitting fees for residential renovations involving safety and accessibility for disabled veterans. It also removed the limit on fees for license tags which are directed to Florida's Veterans' Home Trust Funds. The legislation also incorporates the U.S. Code which provides tuition and fee deferments for eligible veterans attending Florida institutions of higher learning into Florida Law.

== Organization ==
The department is headed by an executive director with a deputy executive director over four divisions (Administration, Veteran's Benefits, Information Technology and Veterans' Homes) and three directors (General Counsel, Legislative Affairs and Communications). An inspector general reports directly to the executive director.

=== Commission on Veterans' Affairs ===
The Commission on Veterans' Affairs was appointed by the Governor of Florida to represent veterans residing in locations throughout the state. Its function was to act as liaison for the FDVA with veteran's organizations & auxiliaries, communities and individuals. The rules creating the commission were repealed on June 10, 2008.

=== Foundation ===
The Florida Legislature authorized the Florida Veterans Foundation in 2008 as a tax-exempt, non-profit 501(c)(3) organization to support the FDVA and provide service and financial assistance to Florida's veterans. The voluntary board of directors is chosen by the executive director of the FDVA. Fundraising activities include cooperative projects with businesses and donations from corporations, charitable foundations, individuals and veterans.

=== Hall Of Fame ===
Florida Department of Veterans' Affairs also supports the Florida Veterans Hall of Fame Council. The council was established by the 2012 Florida Legislature for the purpose of identifying nominees for selection by the Governor and Cabinet to the Florida Veterans Hall of Fame. Although not a Military Hall of Fame, the State Veterans' Hall of Fame was created to recognize and honor those military veterans who, through their works and lives during or after military service, have made a significant contribution to the State of Florida.

=== Nursing homes ===
The State Veterans' Homes Program is funded by the United States Department of Veterans Affairs (USDVA) and permits states to collect a per diem to help pay for the care of qualified veterans. Residents in the program do not require Medicaid, which saves the state money.

The FDVA operates six long-term medical care facilities in the following locations: Daytona Beach (Volusia County), Land O' Lakes (Pasco County), Pembroke Pines (Broward County), Port Charlotte (Charlotte County), Springfield (Bay County) and St. Augustine (St. Johns County).

The facility in Lake City (Columbia County) is intended for Domiciliary Care where the client requires assistance with one or more instrumental activities of daily living (IADL) which permit the individual to live independently. IADLs include preparing meals, shopping, taking medications, simple housework, using technology (including the telephone), and managing money.

=== Division of Benefits and Assistance ===
The Claims and Benefits Division provides many different services to the veterans and their dependents. The primary function is to assist veterans and their dependents with their claims before the USDVA. Claims worked through the Tallahassee claims office help claimants obtain compensation and pension benefits. The FDVA is accredited with 12 service organizations in order to better represent the claimant with their claims and appeals. They include American Ex-Prisoners of War, American Legion, American Red Cross, Blinded Veterans Association, Fleet Reserve Association, Jewish War Veterans, Marine Corps League, National Association of County Veteran Service Officers, Non-Commissioned Officers Association, The Retired Enlisted Association, Veterans of World War I of the USA (Family Members) and Vietnam Veterans of America.

FDVA Claims Officers will assist in the appeals process, and if necessary, represent the claimant at a personal hearing before the USDVA Hearing Officer. Disabled veterans are eligible to receive free hunting & fishing permits, license plates, exemption from property taxes, toll and parking permits, and tuition deferral.

== See also ==
- United States Department of Veterans Affairs
