= Italian American War Veterans of the United States =

The Italian American War Veterans of the United States (ITAMVETS) is an Italian American veterans organization. The group was granted a congressional charter under Title 36 of the United States Code on November 20, 1981.

Any American citizen who was honorably discharged or separated from the U.S. armed forces during the periods of war or conflict is eligible for membership. Posthumous membership may be given to those who have died in wartime and active duty membership may be given to those who remain in the military. Posts currently exist in Connecticut, Florida, Illinois, Massachusetts, New Jersey, New York, Ohio, Pennsylvania and Rhode Island. The National Ladies Auxiliary is the affiliate organization for women.
