= National Safe Boating Council =

- Abbreviation: NSBC
- Predecessor: National Safe Boating Committee
- Formation: September 1958; 68 years ago (as National Safe Boating Committee); Reincorporated 1974 (as National Safe Boating Council, Inc.)
- Type: Membership organization
- Legal status: Active
- Purpose: Reducing boating accidents and enhancing the boating experience; Providing education and training programs to promote safe recreational boating
- Location: United States
- Origins: Formed to educate boaters during National Safe Boating Week
- Services: Boating safety instructor training, education, and outreach programs (Safe Boating Campaign, Get Connected, Waves of Hope)
- Fields: Boating safety
- Members: Over 500 (individuals and organizations)
- Executive Director: Peg Phillips
- Communications Director: Yvonne Pentz
- Affiliations: National Association of State Boating Law Administrators; Canadian Safe Boating Council
- Website: safeboatingcouncil.org
- Formerly called: National Safe Boating Committee (until 1974)

The National Safe Boating Council is a membership organization with over 500 U.S. and International members committed to reducing boating accidents and enhancing the boating experience. The Council states its commitment as "to providing education and training programs to promote a safe recreational boating experience."

The National Safe Boating Council is the leading organization managing the North American Safe Boating Campaign, uniting the efforts of a wide variety of boating safety advocates, including the National Association of State Boating Law Administrators (NASBLA), the Canadian Safe Boating Council and the many members of the National Safe Boating Council.

== History ==
The National Safe Boating Council was formed in September 1958 as the National Safe Boating Committee to educate boaters about safe boating during National Safe Boating Week.

The first time there was a week designated to safe boating was in June 1952 when the U.S. Coast Guard Auxiliary observed a “Safe Boating Week” as a Courtesy Examination weekend in Amesbury, Massachusetts. This tradition continued until 1957 when an official National Safe Boating Week observation took place sponsored by the United States Coast Guard Auxiliary in various parts of the country.

As a result, the U.S. Coast Guard prepared a Resolution, and on June 4, 1958, President Dwight D. Eisenhower signed PL 85-445, to establish National Safe Boating Week as the first week starting on the first Sunday in June. The National Safe Boating Week Committee, now known as the National Safe Boating Council, organized the event by coordinating efforts among the various boating safety groups. In 1995, the date for National Safe Boating Week was finally changed to the full week (Saturday – Friday) before Memorial Day Weekend each year. This allowed the message of safe boating to reach more boaters before the season and enforce the message for a longer amount of time each year.

The National Safe Boating Week Committee branched out on its own as the National Safe Boating Committee, Inc. in 1973 to lead major boating safety efforts. The following year, the committee was reincorporated as the National Safe Boating Council, Inc.

In 2000, US Congressman Mario Biaggi was inducted into the National Safe Boating Council’s Boating Safety Hall of Fame. During his tenure in office he was Chairman of the United States House Committee on Merchant Marine and Fisheries Subcommittee on Coast Guard and Navigation.

The Council’s efforts are led by Executive Director Peg Phillips. Phillips serves as the technical content advisor in direct support of the NSBC’s education, training and outreach programs; plans and develops national boating safety awareness projects and campaigns; and serves as a representative of the NSBC to national and international organizations. Phillips is joined by the NSBC Communications Director, Yvonne Pentz, and support staff.

== Membership ==
Currently, the Council has a membership of over 500 individuals and organizations. These organizations are federal, state and local agencies involved in recreational boating safety and educational activities, national and regional nonprofit public service organizations, and boating industry organizations. They represent, advocate, and champion boating safety nationally and internationally.

== Programs ==
The Council promotes and sponsors boating safety instructor training courses and programs including:

Safe Boating Campaign

A worldwide effort focused on responsible boating, encouraging boaters to always wear a life jacket while on the water.

Get Connected

Designed to educate boaters about different engine cut-off device technologies currently available on the market, and how the use of such devices can proactively make a day on the water safer.

Waves of Hope

A single point of engagement for anyone affected by a boating accident to connect with others who have been impacted and to actively educate the public about how to prevent boating tragedies.

== Annual conference ==
In 1997, the Council joined with the National Water Safety Congress (NWSC) and the National Association of State Boating Law Administrators (NASBLA) to create one, annual event called the International Boating and Water Safety Summit (IBWSS). The IBWSS is the premier event for training, awareness, meeting and networking for anyone involved in boating and water safety.

== See also ==
- United States Coast Guard Auxiliary
- United States Power Squadrons
