= European Atlas of the Seas =

Web-based atlas

The European Atlas of the Seas is an interactive web-based atlas that provides information on the coasts and seas in Europe. The latest version of the Atlas was released on 16 September 2020 and is available in the 24 official languages of the European Union.

== See also ==
- European Maritime Day
