= China National Maritime Day =

China National Maritime Day, officially referred to as Maritime Day of China, also known as China Maritime Day, Maritime Day in China, Chinese: 中国航海日; pinyin: hanghairi, is celebrated July 11, 2005, commemorating marked Zheng He's first voyage. It is celebrated primarily in China and Taiwan, who has been officially celebrating the day since 1955. The date marks the 600th anniversary of the ocean voyages of Zheng He, the Ming dynasty (1368–1644) navigator, who went on seven voyages to show China's might to the rest of the world, under the command of Yongle Emperor. These voyages sought to prove to the Chinese people that the usurper Yongle was worthy of the throne and the gods accepted him with the Mandate of Heaven. The celebration's creation honors China's commitment to the International Maritime Organization, of which it is a member.

== See also ==
- Maritime Day

== Notes ==
- Ignatius, Adi (August 20, 2001). "The Asian Voyage: In the Wake of the Admiral". Time. Archived from the original on August 18, 2001.
