= Observant =

Observant may refer to:

- Making an observation
- Having observance of a
  - holiday (public, religious, etc.)
  - religious law or spiritual practice (worship, diet, taboo, etc.)
- Observantism, late medieval movement among Catholic religious orders
- The Observants, one-eyed ghosts in Danny Phantom
- Ob(Servant), 2008 death metal album by Psycroptic
- Rite of Strict Observance, former Rite of Freemasonry

== See also ==
- Observer (disambiguation)
- Observance (disambiguation)
