= European Maritime Day =

European Maritime Day (EMD), celebrated on 20 May each year, seeks to raise European citizens' awareness of the seas and their importance. Several events take place during that day, including an annual stakeholder conference co-organised by the European Commission. European Maritime Day was established jointly by the European Council, European Parliament and European Commission in 2008 as part of the EU maritime policy.

The European Maritime Day is celebrated each year on 20 May since 2008. This annual event was established jointly by the European Council, the European Parliament and European Commission as part of the EU's Integrated Maritime Policy launched in 2007. It aims to encourage better stewardship of coastal zones, seas and oceans. During European Maritime Day, tribute is paid to "Maritime Europe" and all maritime sectors and activities are put in the spotlight to help European citizens realise the real outreach and variety of sea-related activities going on in Europe.

== EMD conferences ==
| Date | Host city | Location | Theme and information |
|---|---|---|---|
| 21–22 May 2026 | Limassol, Cyprus | | |
| 21–23 May 2025 | Cork, Ireland | | |
| 30–31 May 2024 | Svendborg, Denmark | | |
| 24–25 May 2023 | Brest, France | | |
| 19–20 May 2022 | Ravenna, Italy | | |
| 20–21 May 2021 | Den Helder, The Netherlands | Online, broadcast from De Kampanje theatre | |
| 14–15 May 2020 | Cork, Ireland | | |
| 16–17 May 2019 | Lisbon, Portugal | | |
| 31 May–1 June 2018 | Burgas, Bulgaria | | |
| 18–19 May 2017 | Poole, England | | "The Future of our Seas" |
| 18–19 May 2016 | Turku, Finland | | "Investing in blue growth – smart and sustainable solutions" |
| 28–31 May 2015 | Piraeus, Greece | | "Ports and Coasts, Gateways to Maritime Growth" |
| 19–20 May 2014 | Bremen, Germany | | "Innovation driving Blue Growth" |
| 20–21 May 2013 | Valletta, Malta | | "Coastal Development and Sustainable Maritime Tourism" Malta is the most southern point of the EU. It has been called the gateway to the Mediterranean, and throughout modern and ancient history, its location has given it great strategic maritime importance. For thousands of years, Malta has been the outpost between the East, Africa and Europe. Malta has a long maritime tradition that goes back thousands of years, it currently has the largest shipping register in Europe. |
| 21–22 May 2012 | Gothenburg, Sweden | Eriksbergshallen | "Sustainable Growth from the Oceans, Seas and Coasts" The conference is co-organised by the Directorate-General for Maritime Affairs and Fisheries, the Region Västra Götaland, the City of Gothenburg and the Swedish Ministry of Enterprise. The theme of this year's conference is "Sustainable growth from the oceans, seas and the coasts". Among the speakers are Commissioner Ms. Maria Damanaki, the Secretary General of the International Maritime Organization, Mr. Koji Sekimizu, the Swedish Minister of Infrastructure, Ms. Catharina Elmsäter-Svärd, the Swedish Minister of Environment Lena Ek and the CEO of Shipping, Drilling and Ferries for Stena AB, Mr. Carl-Johan Hagman. |
| 19–21 May 2011 | Gdańsk, Poland | Polish Baltic Philharmonic | "Maritime Policy: Putting People First" The conference was being co-organised by the Directorate-General for Maritime Affairs and Fisheries, Ministry of Infrastructure of Poland, authorities of the Pomerania Region, and the city of Gdańsk. Its programme focused on jobs and training in the maritime sectors and on the maritime sectors' potential to trigger the economic growth in the coastal regions. |
| 18–21 May 2010 | Gijón, Spain | | "How to foster innovation?" This event was part of the events within the Spanish presidency of the EU. The Commissioner Joe Borg, the State Secretary of the Spanish Government, Diego López Garrido, and the President of Asturias Vicente Álvarez Areces were in charge of formalising the agreement. Almost 2000 European Maritime Policy stakeholders attended the conference. The main theme was innovation, in particular its role in the design of competition policy, environmental protection, improvement of working conditions and employment On 20 May Felipe, Prince of Asturias, EU Commissioner Maria Damanaki, Diego López Garrido, Vicente Álvarez Areces, and the Mayor of Gijón Paz Fernández Felgueroso spoke. |
| 18–20 May 2009 | Rome, Italy | | "Integrated Maritime Policy and the contribution of maritime clusters" Focused public attention both on Europe's rich maritime heritage and on the crucial role the maritime sector plays in the development of a sustainable future for the EU. The three-day conference was hosted by the Italian Government. High level speakers included Commission President José Manuel Barroso, Rodi Kratsa-Tsagaropoulou, vice-president of the European Parliament and Stefan Füle, Minister for European Affairs of the Czech Republic representing of the Presidency of the Council of the EU; as well as around 30 ministers from EU Member States and MED countries The commission was also represented with Vice-Presidents Antonio Tajani and Verheugen, and Commissioner Joe Borg. More than 1200 people attended the Conference which had 125 speakers. |
| 2008 | Brussels, Belgium | | "A regional approach to the implementation of Maritime Policy" |

== See also ==
- Maritime Day
- European Atlas of the Seas
- International Maritime Organization
