= United States National Maritime Day =

Holiday in the United States

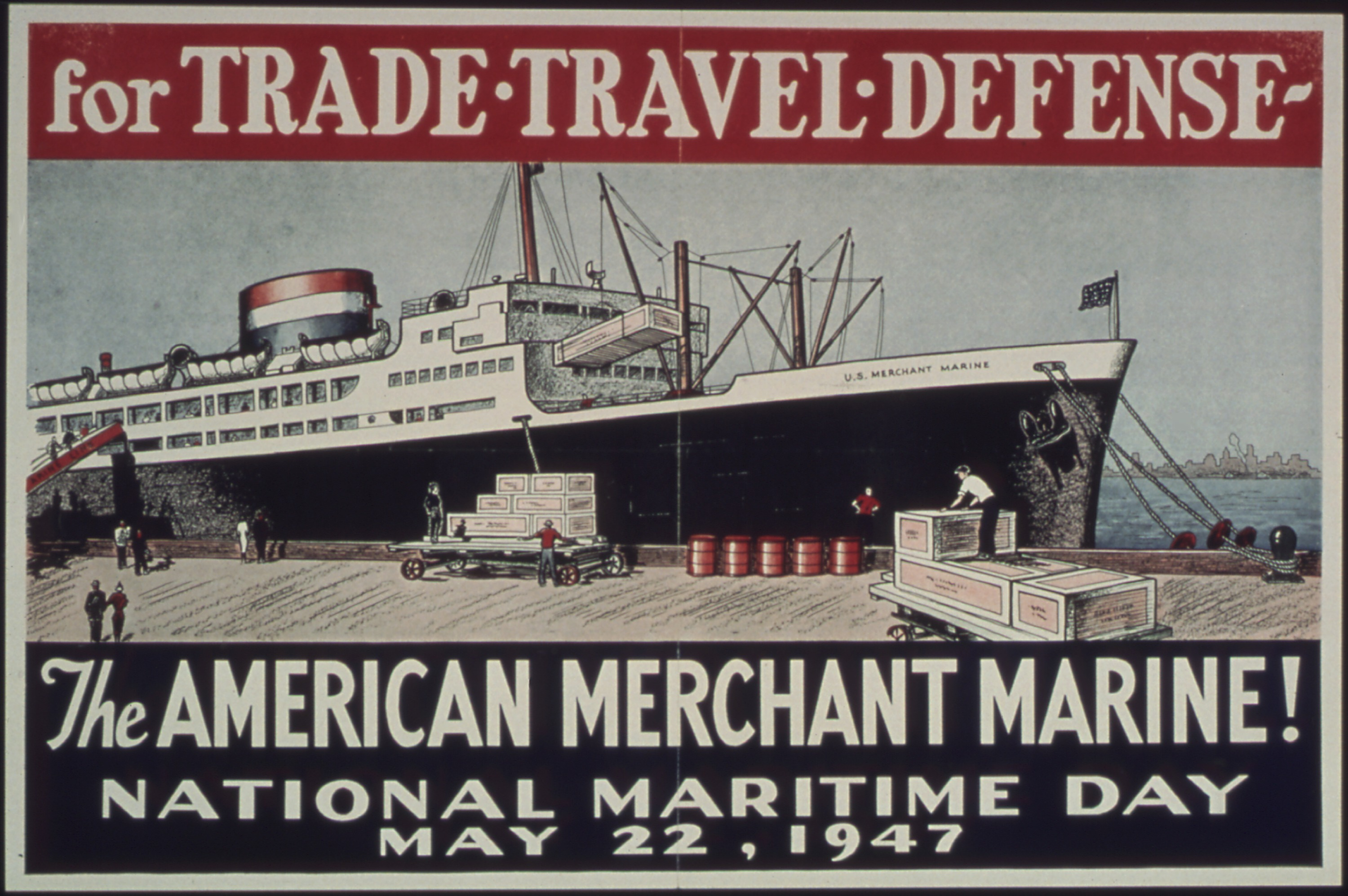
National Maritime Day, May 22, 1947

National Maritime Day is a United States federal observance created to recognize the maritime industry. It is observed on May 22, the date in 1819 that the American steamship Savannah set sail from Savannah, Georgia on the first ever transoceanic voyage under steam power. The holiday was created by the United States Congress on May 20, 1933.

On May 22, 2002, the Military Sealift Command observed National Maritime Day with a memorial service held in Washington, DC. Rear Adm. David L. Brewer III, Commander, Military Sealift Command, and Gordon R. England, Secretary of the Navy, tossed a wreath into the Anacostia River at the Washington Navy Yard in honor of fallen mariners.

In 2013, National Maritime Day was celebrated with family picnics and boat tours at the Port of San Diego, and with maritime career fairs in Seattle and the Port of Baltimore, as well as with traditional memorial ceremonies.

On May 22, 2016, the Baltimore events were held aboard NS Savannah, Pier 13 of the Canton Marine Terminal in Baltimore, Maryland. Boy Scout Explorer Post # 0438, a re-enactment group representing the First Baltimore Sharpshooters, a.k.a. Aisquith's Sharpshooters, was there in replica uniforms. Many other groups, both businesses, non-profit groups, and educational groups were present. Docked alongside the NS Savannah was Golden Bear, a training ship from California that was built nearby in Bethlehem Steel in Sparrows Point, Maryland, in 1986.

== Gallery ==
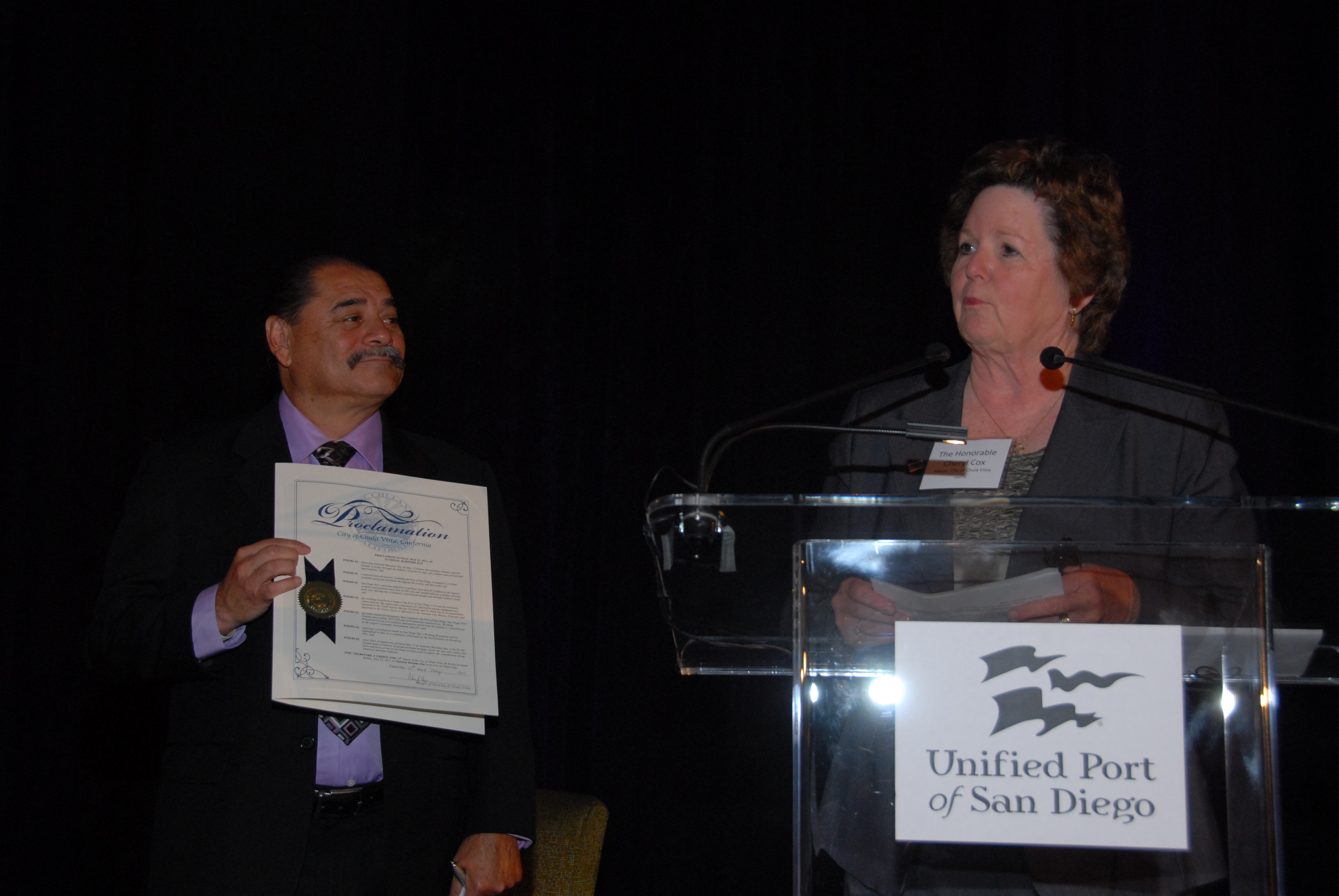
A San Diego Port Commissioner celebrates National Maritime Day with the Mayor of Chula Vista, 2011

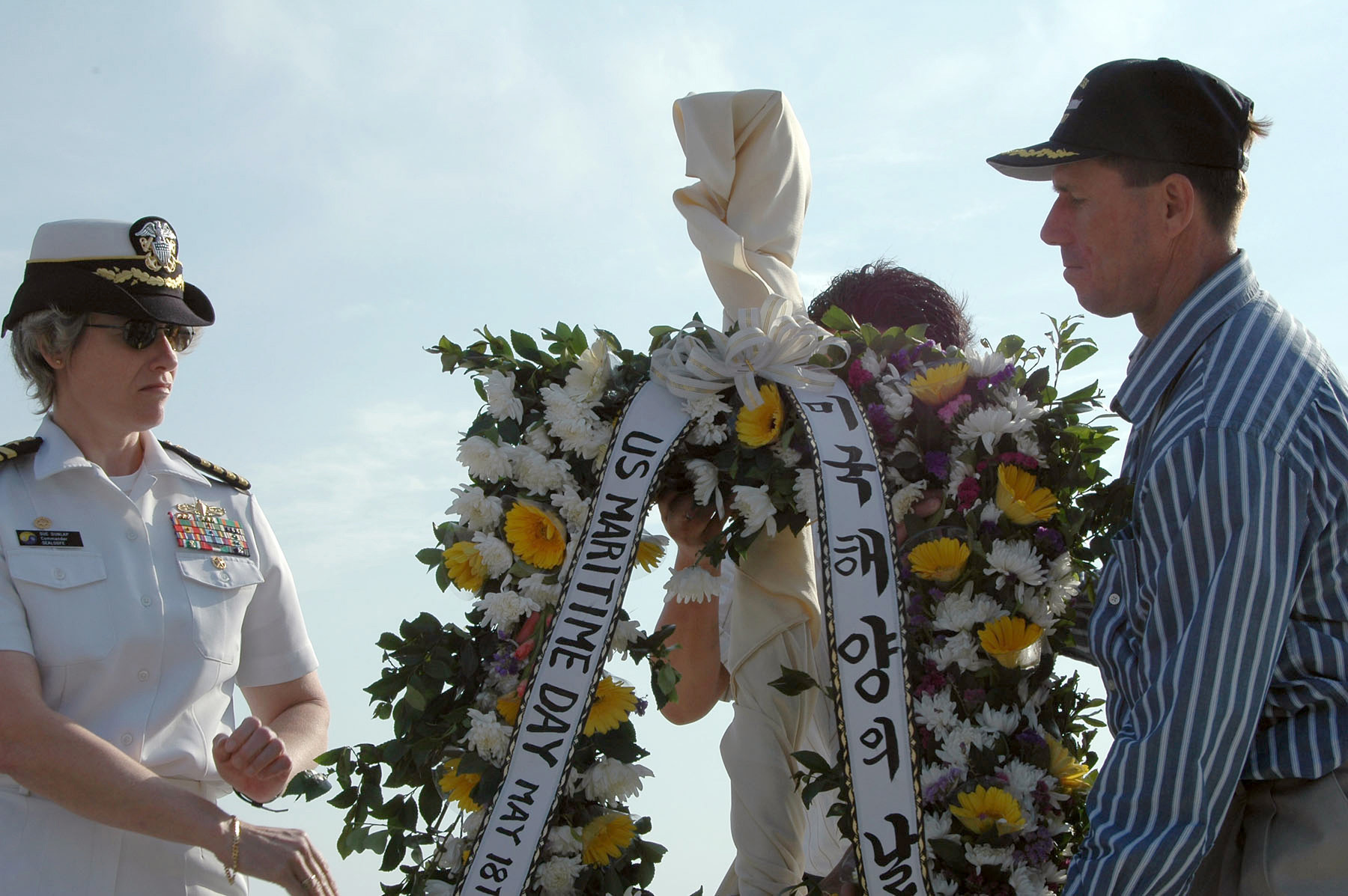
2007 celebration in Pusan, Korea

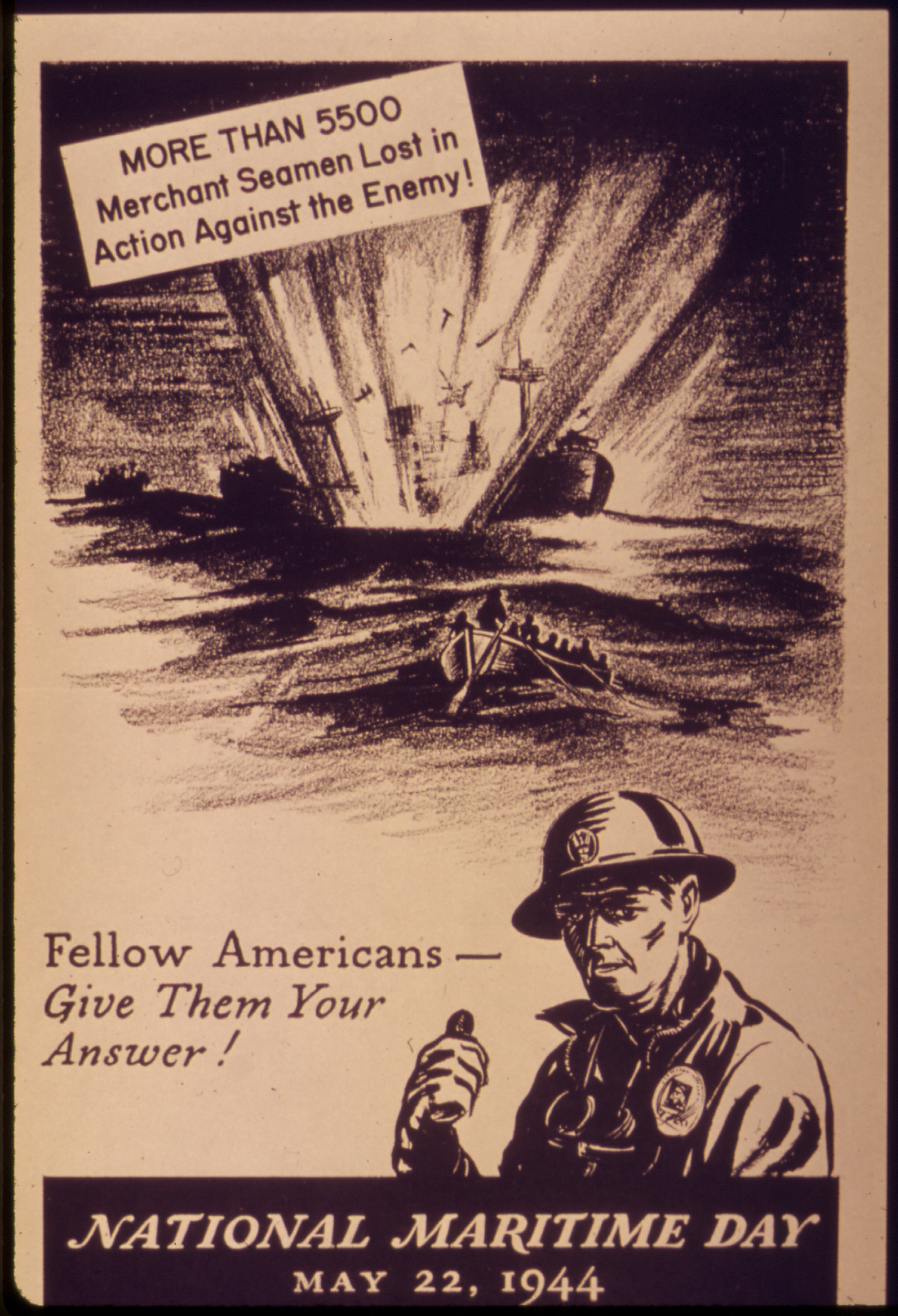
Somber commemoration of National Maritime Day in 1944

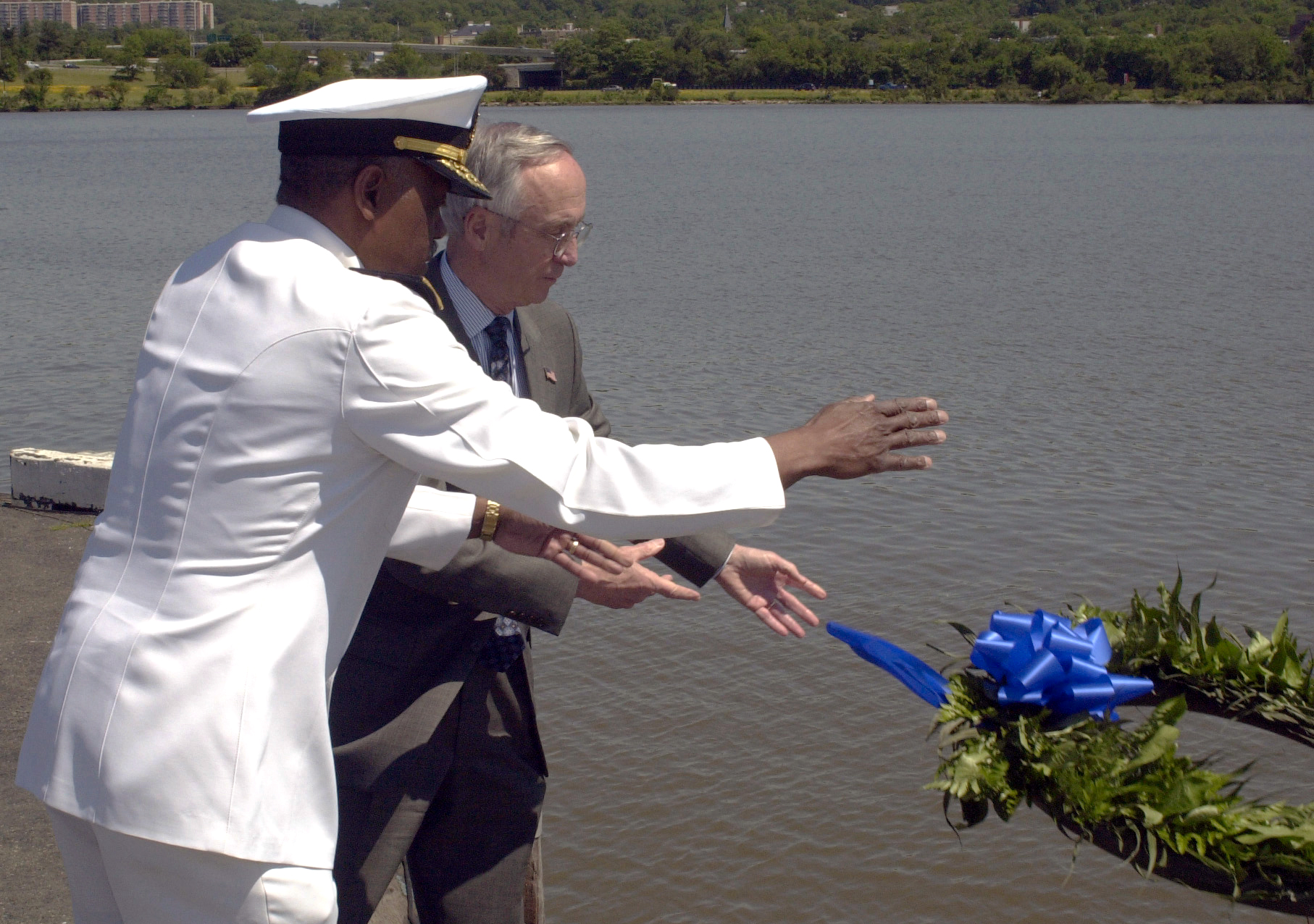
2002 ceremony at Washington Navy Yard

== See also ==
- Maritime Day
