= Observance =

Observance may refer to:

- Holiday, day(s) of observance
- Anniversary, the date on which an event took place or an institution was founded in a previous year, and may also refer to the commemoration or celebration of that event
- List of minor secular observances
- United States observances
- Observance (film), a 2015 Australian film

== See also ==
- Observant (disambiguation)
- Observer (disambiguation)
