= North American Safe Boating Campaign =

The Safe Boating Campaign is a year-round campaign focused on spreading the message of boating safety, encouraging boater education, and helping to save lives. It kicks off each year the full week before Memorial Day Weekend with National Safe Boating Week, with focused efforts during the peak boating season of May – September. Promoting life jacket wear by every boater is the leading goal of the Campaign.

2008

Created in 1958 as National Safe Boating Week, the official entrance of Canada in 2000 transformed the event into a larger, international campaign known as North American Safe Boating Campaign. The Campaign is a core program of the National Safe Boating Council.

== History ==
The North American Boating Campaign was originally known as “Safe Boating Week,” observed by the U.S. Coast Guard Auxiliary as a Courtesy Examination weekend in Amesburg, Massachusetts in June 1952. This tradition continued until 1957 when an official National Safe Boating Week observation took place sponsored by the United States Coast Guard Auxiliary in various parts of the country.

As a result, the U.S. Coast Guard prepared a Resolution, and on June 4, 1958, President Dwight D. Eisenhower signed PL 85-445, to establish National Safe Boating Week as the first week starting on the first Sunday in June. The National Safe Boating Week Committee, now known as the National Safe Boating Council, organized the event by coordinating efforts among the various boating safety groups.

In 1995, the date for National Safe Boating Week was finally changed to the full week (Saturday – Friday) before Memorial Day Weekend each year. This allowed the message of safe boating to reach more boaters before the season and enforce the message for a longer amount of time each year. The official entrance of Canada in 2000 transformed National Safe Boating Week into a larger, international event with partnerships with the Canadian Safe Boating Council and Canadian Coast Guard. National Safe Boating Week now serves as the kick off for the North American Safe Boating Campaign, a year-round campaign that is focused during the summer months of May – September.

== Programs ==
The Campaign provides the public with education and information about safe boating. Through press releases, public service announcements, informational campaign mailers, and other efforts, the Campaign is able to reach a wide range of individuals with boating safety materials. This information is intended to enhance and supplement groups, associations and organizations boating safety campaigns across the United States and Canada during National Safe Boating Week.

Throughout the years, the Campaign has strengthened and worked to gain more national attention across the U.S. In 2006, “Wear It!” became the official slogan of the campaign. Routine and consistent life jacket wear during all water activities can make the difference between life and death. According to the U.S. Coast Guard:

- 90 percent of drowning victims in recreational boating accidents were not wearing a life jacket in 2007.
- Drowning is the reported cause of death in two-thirds of all boating fatalities.

In 2007, The Delta region in Sacramento, California was chosen to be the first targeted area in the U.S. for campaign efforts. As a result, life jacket wear rate increased from a baseline measurement of 6.2 percent to 12.2 percent in this area due to the intense marketing of a focused “Wear It!” campaign and the efforts of the U.S. Coast Guard, the National Safe Boating Council, Boat U.S. Foundation, and the California Department of Boating and Waterways.

The National Safe Boating Council decided to continue this targeted approach in 2008, adding Tennessee to its efforts in addition to a general campaign across the country. In 2009, a third state was included – “Wear It Michigan!” began its own campaign using its law enforcement personnel to educate about the boating safety message.

== Partner Organizations ==
The National Safe Boating Council is joined by partner organizations in supporting the Campaign such as Boat U.S. Foundation, National Association of State Boating Law Administrators, Canadian Safe Boating Council, U.S. Army Corps of Engineers, U.S. Coast Guard, U.S. Coast Guard Auxiliary, and U.S. Power Squadrons.

== Logos ==
Over time, the campaign logo has changed to reflect a newer, more comfortable life jacket in conjunction with the current trends of boating. Although the logo and slogan have changed over the years – the message has always been clear – by boating safely and wearing your life jacket, boating can be a fun and safe activity.
