= Blinded Veterans Association =

- Abbreviation: BVA
- Founded: 1945
- Purpose: The Blinded Veterans Association was established specifically to help veterans and their families meet and overcome the challenges of blindness.
- Location: Washington, D.C.
- Origins: Founded by a group of blinded World War II veterans at an Army hospital in Avon Old Farms, CT
- Region served: United States
- Members: 11,000
- Employees: 24
- Website: http://bva.org

The Blinded Veterans Association (BVA) is a U.S non-profit organization that was established to "help veterans and their families meet and overcome the challenges of blindness".

Services from BVA are available to all veterans who have become blind, either during or after active duty. The BVA has its headquarters in Washington, D.C. BVA is a 503(c)(3) registered nonprofit; for the 2008–2009 Fiscal year, BVA's income was $4.2 million.

== Mission ==
The Mission of the BVA is:

- To promote the welfare of blinded veterans so that, notwithstanding their disabilities, they may take their rightful place in the community and work with their fellow citizens toward the creation of a peaceful world.
- To preserve and strengthen a spirit of fellowship among blinded veterans so that they may give mutual aid and assistance to one another.
- To maintain and extend the institution of American freedom and encourage loyalty to the Constitution and laws of the United States and of the states in which they reside.

== History ==
The BVA was established in 1945, at the end of World War II, by young veterans who had lost their sight in combat and were recovering together at an Army hospital in Connecticut. In 1958, the BVA was chartered by the U.S. Congress (Title 36, Chapter 303) to "speak and write on behalf of blinded veterans in national legislative affairs". In addition to its legislative role, BVA has 52 regional groups that help veterans find services such educational services, counseling, peer support, and rehabilitation services. Currently, the BVA membership is about 11,000, but BVA services are available to any blinded veteran, regardless of membership status

== Programs and services ==
Based on VA data, there are estimated to by more than 158,000 veterans in America that have severe vision impairment or blindness. According to the BVA, 13% of wounded U.S. military troops returning from Iraq and Afghanistan have sustained a serious eye injury. In addition, approximately 7,000 veterans become newly blind or visually impaired from non-combat related causes.

Field Service Program

The BVA employs seven full-time Field Service Representatives, who have been strategically placed in different geographical areas throughout the United States. Their goal is to locate and assist blinded veterans in overcoming the challenges inherent in sight loss. Since all of the Field Reps are legally blind veterans themselves, they can be effective role models in demonstrating that fellow veterans can take charge of their lives. Field Reps are responsible for linking veterans with local services, assuring that the newly blinded take advantage of VA Blind Rehabilitation Services, and assisting them with VA claims when necessary. When blinded veterans are ready to return to the workforce, BVA Field Reps can assist them with employment training and placement.

Operation Peer Support

BVA's newest program, Operation Peer Support (OPS) establishes connections between newly blinded veterans returning from the Iraq and Afghanistan wars with veterans who went through a similar transition following World War II, the Korean War, and the Vietnam War. These older blinded vets know the many challenges facing newly blinded service members, and can provide unique insight and understanding, having once faced similar challenges themselves.

== See also ==
- AMVETS
- Disabled American Veterans
- St Dunstan's
