= Cancer Control Month =

- Observed by: United States
- Date: April
- Duration: 1 month
- Frequency: annual

Cancer Control Month is a month-long United States observance established by 36 U.S.C. § 103, a joint resolution approved in 1938 by the Congress and amended to request the President to issue an annual proclamation.

In 2024, the presidential proclamation declares April the National Cancer Prevention and Early Detection Month.

== 2013 edition ==
(a) The president is requested to issue each year a proclamation—

(1) designating April as Cancer Control Month;
(2) to invite each year the chief executive officers of the States, territories, and possessions of the United States to issue proclamations designating April as Cancer Control Month.

(b) Contents of Proclamations.— As part of those proclamations, the chief executive officers and president are requested to invite the medical profession, the press, and all agencies and individuals interested in a national program for the control of cancer by education and other cooperative means to unite during Cancer Control Month in a public dedication to the program and in a concerted effort to make the people of the United States aware of the need for the program.

== See also ==
- Title 36 of the United States Code
- National Coalition for Cancer Survivorship
