= American Heart Month =

Health observance in the United States

- Observed by: United States
- Date: February
- Duration: 1 month
- Frequency: annual
- Related to: National Wear Red Day

American Heart Month is a month-long United States observance established by 36 U.S.C. § 101.

== 2009 edition ==
The President is requested to issue each year a proclamation—

(1) designating February as American Heart Month;
(2) inviting the chief executive officers of the States, territories, and possessions of the United States to issue proclamations designating February as American Heart Month; and
(3) urging the people of the United States to recognize the nationwide problem of heart and blood vessel diseases and to support all essential programs required to solve the problem.

== See also ==
- Title 36 of the United States Code
