= American Ex-Prisoners of War =

American Ex-Prisoners of War is a non-profit service organization that aims to assist the surviving U.S. military and Civilian prisoner of war (POWs), particularly those who are elderly and those who have medical problems. Based in Arlington, Texas, the American Ex–Prisoners of War was founded on April 14, 1942. The AXPOW emblem was designed in Denver, Colorado in 1949 by a former prisoner of war and National Director Bryan T. Doughty. Later the organization also adopted the motto "NON SOLUM ARMIS", which is Latin for "Not by Arms Alone". The organization received a congressional charter under Title 36 of the United States Code in 1982. The group claims a nationwide membership of 12,000.

The group is open to former American POWs of all wars and their immediate families. Its service officers have assisted POW veterans in securing medical services and other entitlements. Former POWs may be eligible for special veterans benefits, including medical care in Veterans Affairs hospitals and disability compensation for injuries and diseases caused by internment. These benefits are in addition to regular veterans' benefits and services to which they are also entitled. Widows and minor children of former POWs may qualify for special benefits and compensation.

Notable members include Wilburn Snyder, James C. Spencer, and D. C. Wimberly.

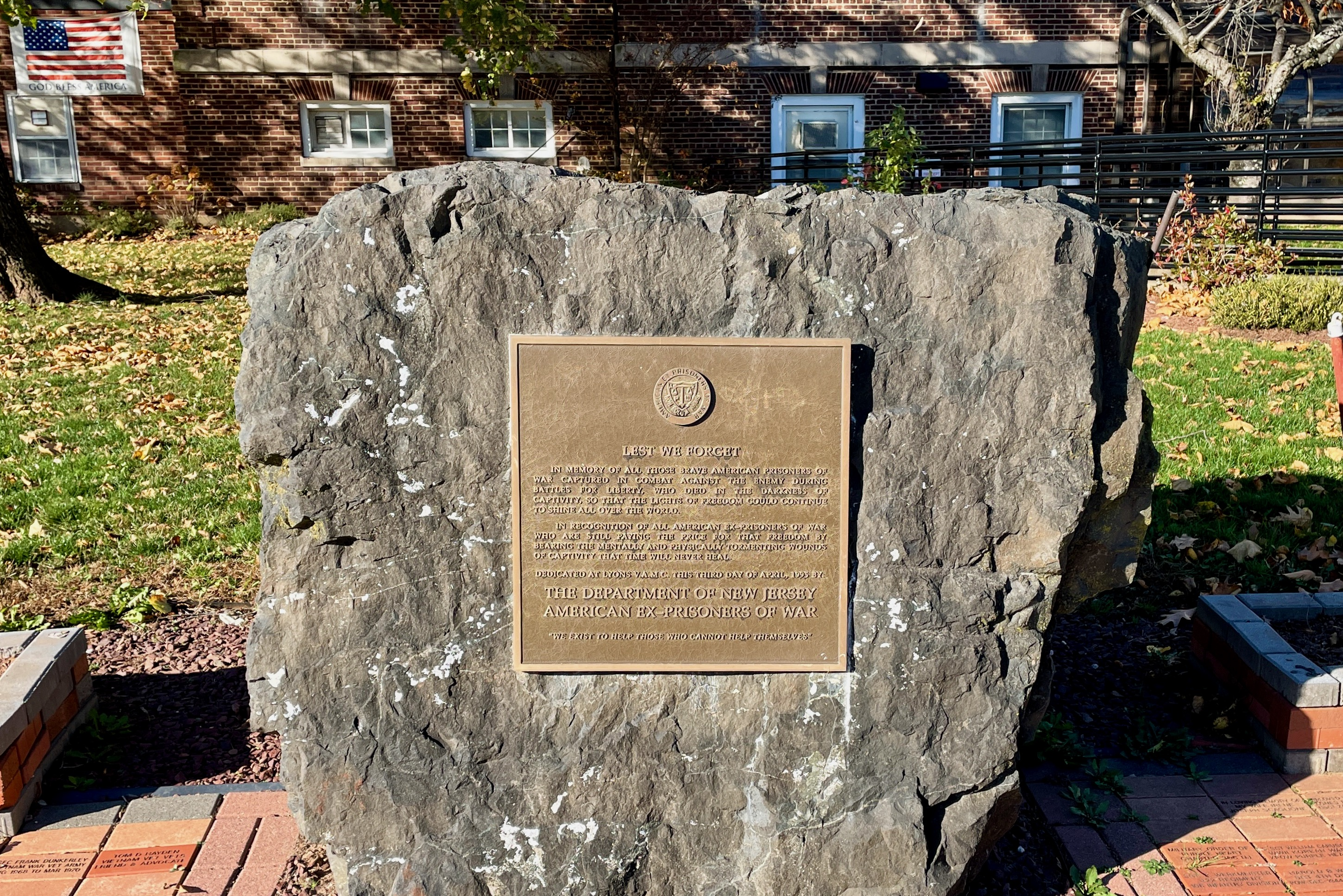
Lest We Forget plaque dedicated at Lyons VA Medical Center in New Jersey

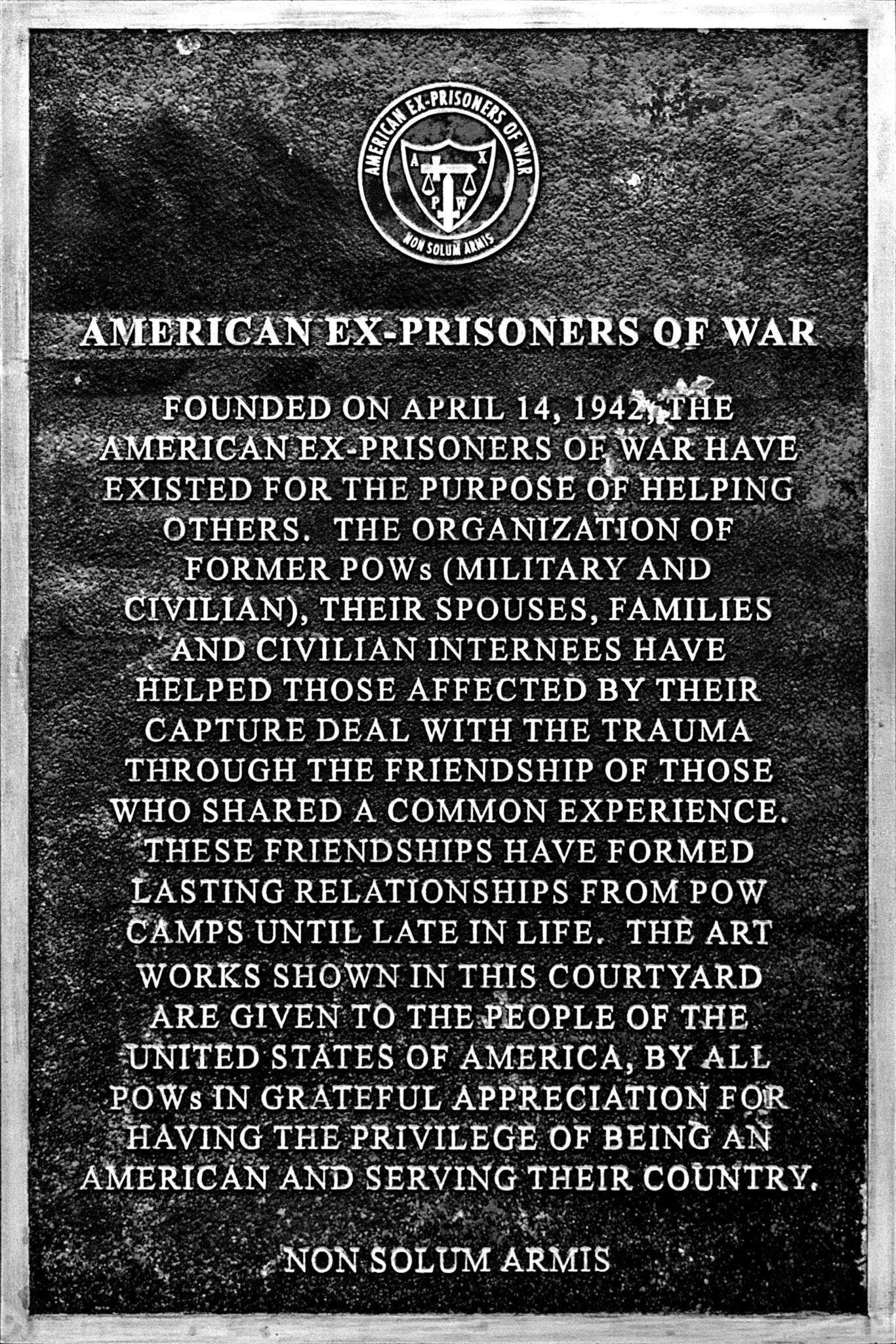
Memorial Plaque at Andersonville NHS

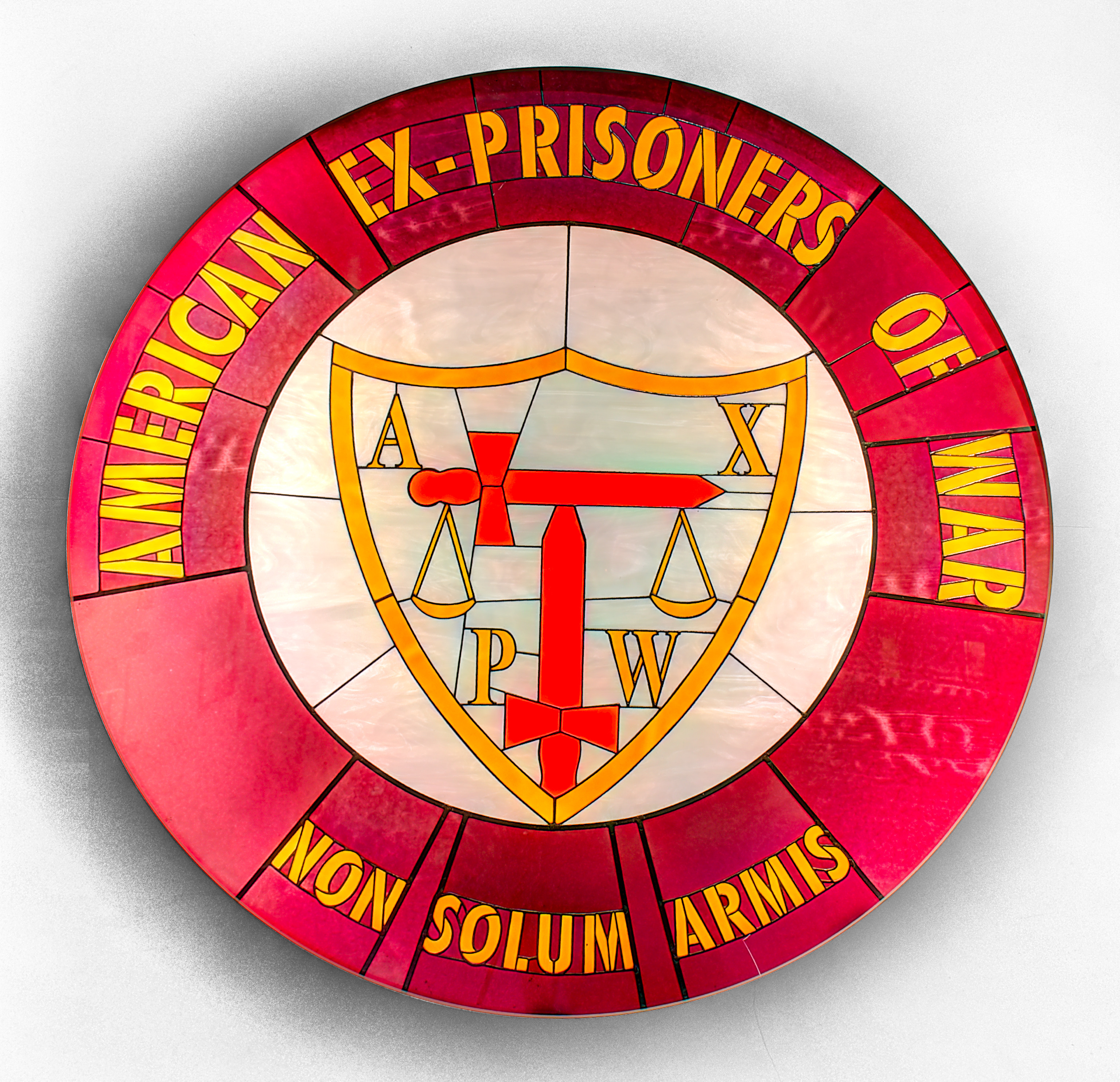
Memorial at Andersonville NHS
