= Christos Tsigiridis =

Greek electrical engineer

Christos Georgiou Tsigiridis
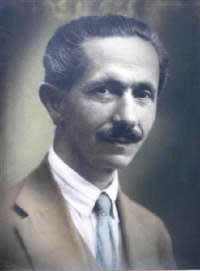
- Christos Tsigiridis picture in color, hosted by Thessaloniki Radio Museum
- Born: 1877; Filibe, Ottoman Empire (today Plovdiv, Bulgaria)
- Died: 17 December 1947 (aged 69 or 70); Thessaloniki, Greece
- Education: Stuttgart, 1900s
- Known for: Radio, founder of the 1st radio station in South-Eastern Europe, in 1926
- Scientific career
- Fields: Electrical engineer

Christos Tsigiridis (Greek: Χρίστος Τσιγγιρίδης, pronounced Greek pronunciation: [ˈxristos tsiɟiˈriðis]; 1877–1947) was a Greek electrical engineer and technological pioneer of his era. He is mainly known for setting up the first radio station in Greece and the wider Balkans based in Thessaloniki.

== Biography ==
Christos Tsigiridis was born in 1877 in Filibe in the Ottoman Empire (today Plovdiv, Bulgaria) to ethnic Greek parents. He grew up under difficult circumstances due to the death of his father. He attended the French High School in his hometown and at the age of 20 he moved to Stuttgart in Germany, where he lived with one of his brother, who also owned a small tobacco factory. In Germany, Tsingiridis also studied electrical engineering at the Technical University of Stuttgart. In 1906 he returned to Plovdiv, but he departed quickly due to the persecution of the Greek minority in Bulgaria, moving back to Stuttgart.

During his second stay in Germany, he became involved in the tobacco trade and at the same time met his wife, Marie Louise Vogel, a German aristocrat of Belgian origin, with whom he had two daughters, Elaia and Georgette. The latter became a distinguished ballet soloist and choreographer. A few years later, Tsigiridis decided to settle permanently in Greece.

After moving to Greece, he settled in Larissa, taking over the management of the city's electricity and water supply, and in 1925 he relocated to Thessaloniki. The following year Tsigiridis participated in the first International Fair of Thessaloniki, presenting loudspeakers and amplifiers as a representative of the German company Siemens & Halske. It is presumed that between 1925 and 1926, he conducted his first experimental radio broadcasts.

It is claimed that on March 25, 1927, on the occasion of the National Holiday, Tsigiridis produced his first experimental radio broadcast, lasting half an hour. The following year, the regular operation of Radio Tsigiridis officially began, broadcasting from the Mars Field in Thessaloniki. It was the first radio station in the country and the Balkans. The cost of its operation was covered by Tsigiridis, as well as by advertising revenues. From 1936 to 1938, Radio Tsigiridis partnered with Ioannis Vellidis' newspaper Macedonia.

During the Occupation of Greece, the German authorities temporarily imprisoned Tsigiridis and at the same time confiscated his business. After the Liberation, the transmitter was temporarily under the control of ELAS before being returned to its owner in 1945, but in 1947 it was requisitioned by the National Radio Foundation.

Tsigiridis died on December 17, 1947. His funeral was paid by the Municipality of Thessaloniki.
