= White Cane Safety Day =

National observance in the United States

- Date: October 15
- Next time: October 15, 2027
- Frequency: annual

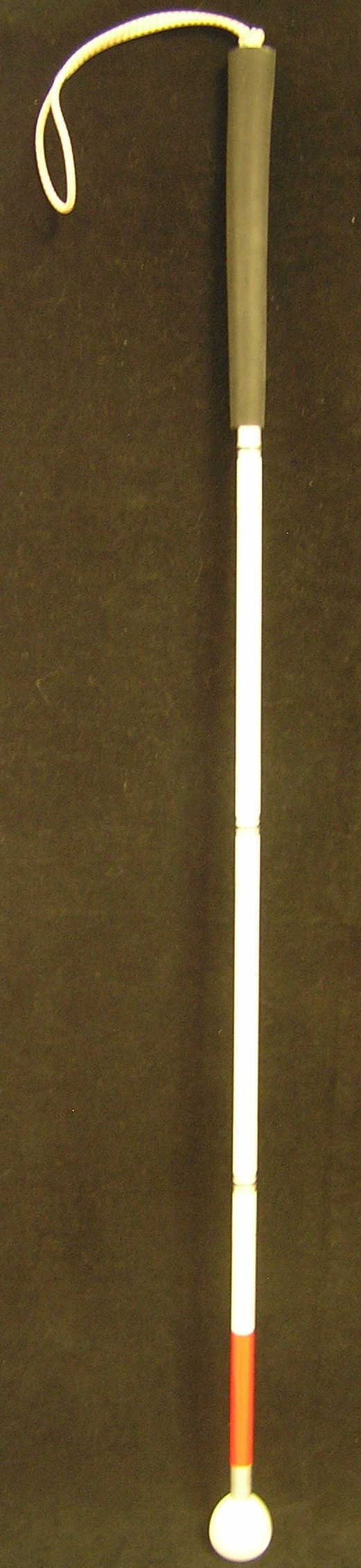
A long white cane, the symbol of White Cane Safety Day

White Cane Safety Day is a national observance in the United States, celebrated annually on October 15 since 1964. The date is set aside to celebrate the achievements of people who are blind or visually impaired and the important symbol of blindness and tool of independence, the white cane.

On October 6, 1964, a joint resolution of the U.S. Congress, H.R. 753, was signed into law as Pub. L. 88–628, and codified at 36 U.S.C. § 142. This resolution authorized the President of the United States to proclaim October 15 of each year as "White Cane Safety Day".

President Lyndon B. Johnson signed the first White Cane Safety Day proclamation within hours of the passage of the joint resolution.

In 2011, White Cane Safety Day was also named Blind Americans Equality Day by President Barack Obama.
