= National Aviation Day =

Observation in the United States

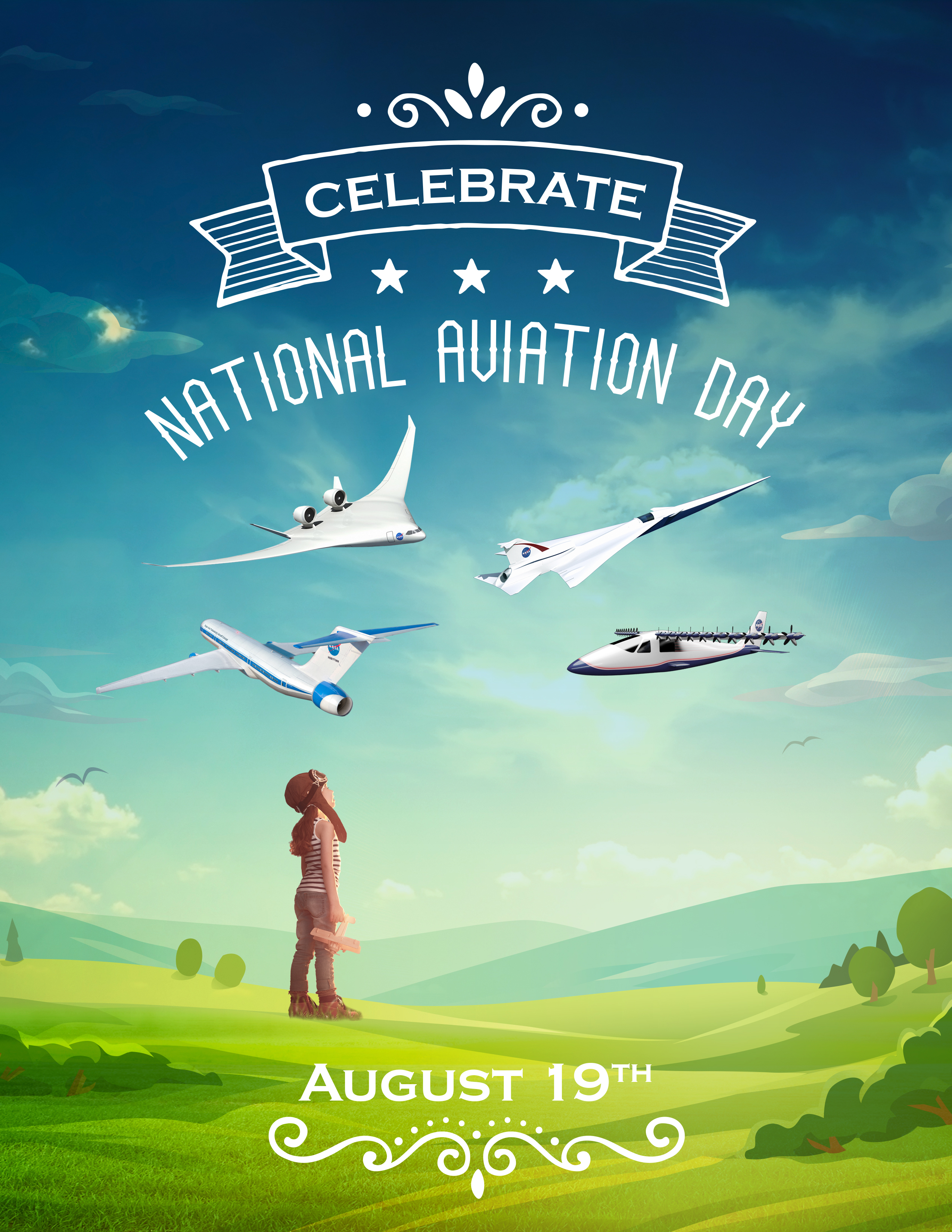
- Poster by NASA for National Aviation Day
- Begins: August 19, 1939
- Date: August 19
- Next time: August 19, 2026
- Frequency: annual

The National Aviation Day (August 19) is a United States national observation that celebrates the development of aviation.

== History ==
The National Aviation Day was established in 1939 by Franklin Delano Roosevelt, who issued a presidential proclamation that designated the anniversary of Orville Wright's birthday to be National Aviation Day. The proclamation was codified (USC 36:I:A:1:118), and it allows the sitting US president to proclaim August 19 as National Aviation Day each year, if desired. Their proclamation may direct all federal buildings and installations to fly the US Flag that day and may encourage citizens to observe the day with activities that promote interest in aviation.

== Events ==
Air shows on or near the time of National Aviation Day for 2018 included:

- Chicago Air and Water Show
- Atlantic City Airshow
- Canadian International Air Show
- Cleveland National Air Show
- New York Air Show

The Chicago Air and Water Show hosted a NASA village in 2018. The NASA village also celebrated the 60th anniversary of NASA and included information about projects like the Space Launch System, a large rocket under development in the 2010s. As part of the National Aviation Day festivities at the North Beach location, NASA opened its Journey to Tomorrow traveling exhibit.

== See also ==
- Wright Brothers Day – United States national observation
- National Aerospace Week
- Pan American Aviation Day – December observance
