= Maritime Day =

Maritime Days are holidays typically established to recognize accomplishments in the maritime field. Maritime Days include:

- China National Maritime Day
- European Maritime Day
- Indian Maritime Day (5 April)
- Mexican National Maritime Day
- Pakistan National Maritime Day
- Slovenian Maritime Day (7 March)
- United States National Maritime Day
- World Maritime Day (last Thursday in September)

== See also ==
- Navy Day
