= Carl Garner =

American engineer

William Carl Garner (June 1, 1915 – July 6, 2014) was an American engineer. He served as resident engineer of Greers Ferry Lake since its construction in 1959, and in that capacity, he organized a citizen cleanup of the area which expanded to Carl Garner Federal Lands Cleanup Day. The attention the program has received has also made people more aware of the problem of litter and preservation of the environment during the entire year.

== Biography ==
Garner was born in Moorefield, Arkansas, the son of Burton John Garner and Minnie Pearl Morgan. He was the first born out of six raised on a farm near Sulphur Rock, Arkansas. Carl attended Sulphur Rock High School and was salutatorian of his class when he graduated. Because of his basketball record he received a basketball scholarship from Arkansas College (now Lyon College), which he attended and graduated from in 1938 with a degree in economics. His first wife was Ruth Elizabeth Wade, daughter of Ernest Wade and Lizzie Estella Leggett. They were married September 18, 1940, and had a son. His second wife, Ima Jean "Jean" Reedy, also worked for the U.S. Army Corps of Engineers. They were married in 1972.

Garner's 43-year career with the U.S. Army Corps of Engineers, Little Rock Division, began in 1938 at Pocahontas, Arkansas. He worked in the survey, mapping, estimating, construction and operational branches in Missouri and Arkansas. Chief construction projects he worked on were Bull Shoals, Table Rock and Greers Ferry. In 1962 he became resident engineer in charge of operations and maintenance of the Greers Ferry Project, a position he held until his retirement in 1998.

Garner received numerous awards in recognition of his work. Some of them are: 1963-Social Service Award for preparation of President John F. Kennedy's dedication of the Greers Ferry Project and the guided tour following the dedication; 1967-President's Citation, National Water Safety Congress for outstanding efforts in water safety; 1977-Corps of Engineers Meritorious Service Award and Bronze Medal; special appreciation awards from governors David Pryor and Bill Clinton, and Congressman Bill Alexander; 1979-Award of Excellence from Chief of Engineers as No. 1 Resident Engineer out of 440 Corps of Engineers lakes.

Garner is best known for his development of the Greers Ferry Lake recreational facilities. In 1969 he led the Greers Ferry Lake and Little Red River Tourism Association's first-annual lake shore cleanup program, which has been nationally acclaimed, receiving the Keep America Beautiful Award twice and placing five times. In 1983 Carl Garner was named Arkansas Tourism Person of the Year. In 1984 the Keep America Beautiful first National Public Lands Cleanup Day launched, using the Greers Ferry Lake and Little Red River Tourism Association's annual cleanup as its model. In 1983 the William Carl Garner Visitor Center opened near the dam, telling the story of the Little Red River and the dam development.

He was a fellow in the American Society of Civil Engineers, member of the U.S. Committee on Large Dams and National Trails Council, Vice-President and member of the National Water Safety Congress. Other than professional organizations he was a member of the Board of Associates of Arkansas College; Advisory Board of Foothills Vocational Tech School; Official Board of First United Methodist Church of Heber Springs; and the building committee and service on the Board of Governors for Cleburne County Hospital.

During Carl Garner's more than 57 years of service to the Corps of Engineers in Arkansas, he headed preparations for the dedication of Greers Ferry Dam by President John F. Kennedy and introduced many families to the outdoors.

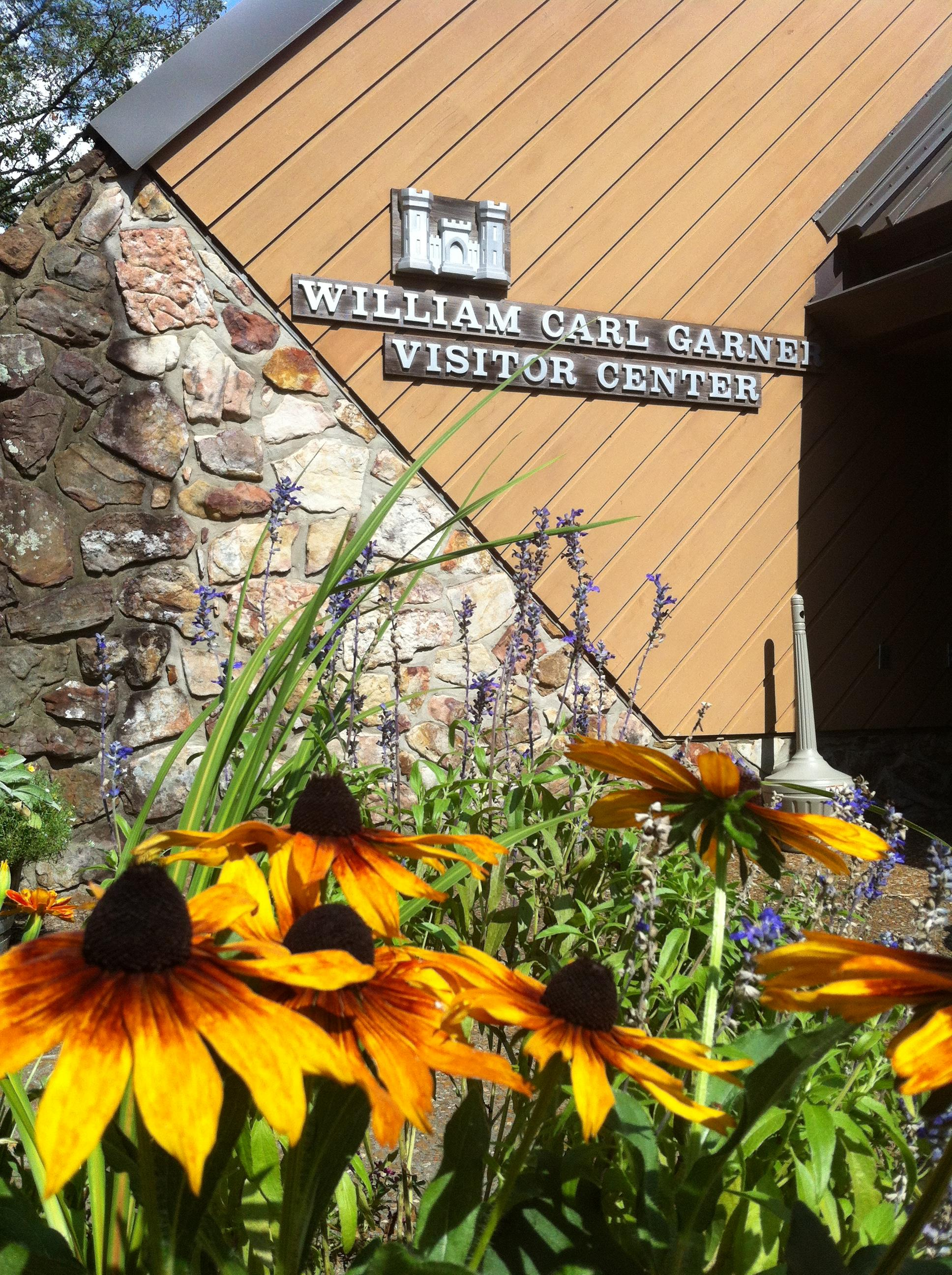
The William Carl Garner Visitor Center at Greers Ferry Lake

The William Carl Garner Visitor Center was named after him and is the U.S. Army Corps of Engineers Visitor Center for Greers Ferry Lake. The center is located on Highway 25 North just west of Greers Ferry Dam near Heber Springs, Arkansas.

He died July 6, 2014, in White County Medical Center in Searcy, White County, Arkansas. He was buried July 2014 in Cleburne County Memorial Gardens in Heber Springs, Cleburne County, Arkansas.

== Carl Garner Federal Lands Cleanup Day ==
Carl Garner Federal Lands Cleanup Day is a day observed in the United States to encourage nationwide citizen participation in the cleanup of federal lands. Per 36 U.S.C. § 104, it occurs on the first Saturday after Labor Day, and may include a variety of programs, ceremonies, and activities. It was created in 1985 by the Federal Lands Cleanup Act as the "Federal Lands National Cleanup Day" and renamed in 1995 to honor Carl Garner and continue and expand his work of encouraging citizens to clean up Greers Ferry Lake and Little Red River in Arkansas.

== See also ==
- National Cleanup Day
