= Peace Officers Memorial Day =

Annual American commemoration

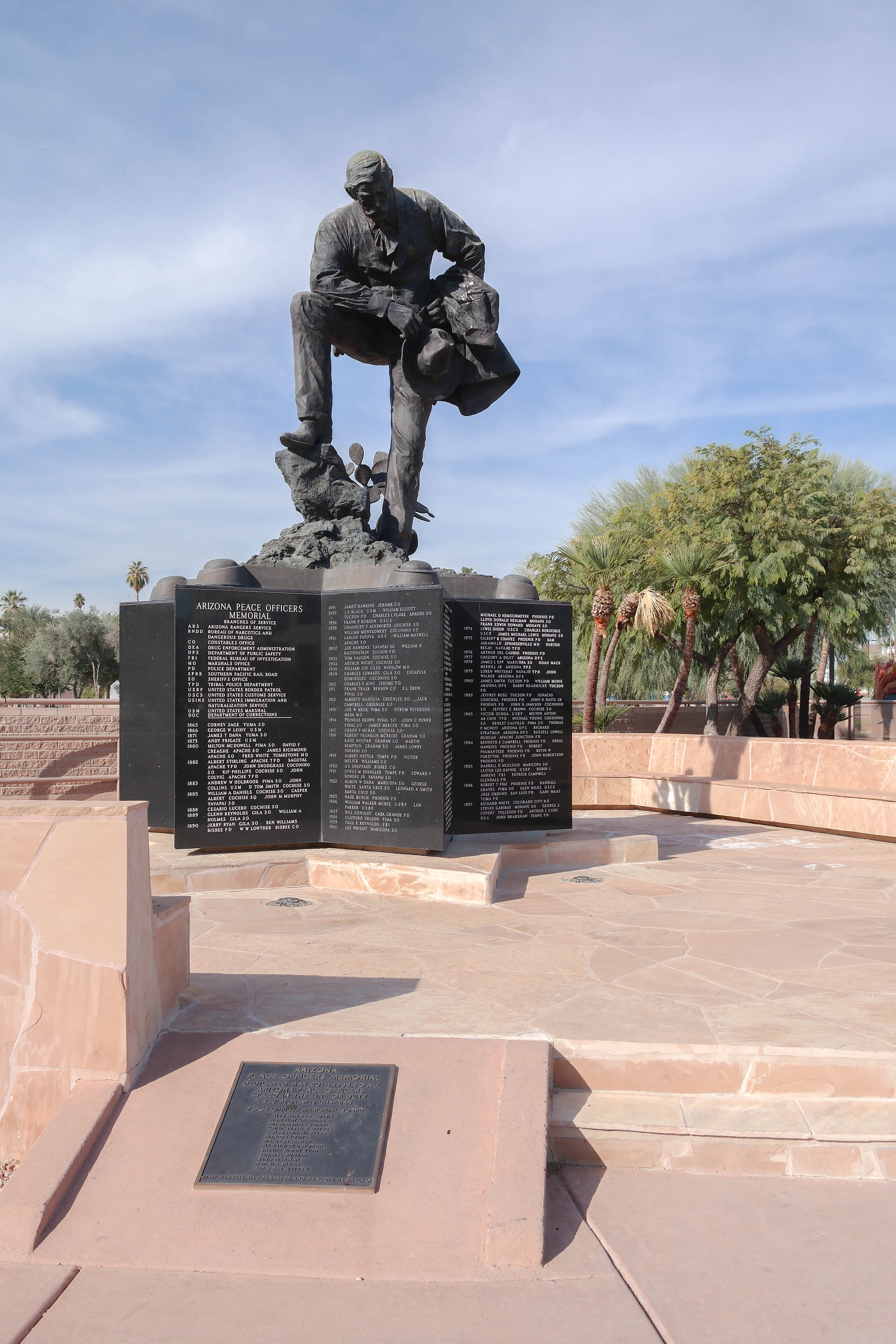
- Arizona Peace Officers Memorial, Wesley Bolin Memorial Plaza
- Official name: Peace Officers Memorial Day
- Also called: National Police Week
- Date: May 15
- Next time: May 15, 2027
- Frequency: annual

Peace Officers Memorial Day and Police Week is an observance in the United States that pays tribute to the local, state, and federal peace officers who have died, or who have been disabled, in the line of duty. It is celebrated May 15 of each year. The event is sponsored by the National Fraternal Order of Police (FOP) and is implemented by the FOP Memorial Committee.

== National Police Week ==
The formal memorial is on May 15, and Police Week is the calendar week in which the memorial falls. Other events of National Police Week include an annual Blue Mass, Candlelight Vigil, Wreath Laying Ceremony, National Police Survivors Conference, Honor Guard Competition, and the Emerald Society & Pipe Band March and Service. The annual event draws 25,000 to 40,000 law enforcement officers, their families, and other visitors to attend.

== Enactment ==
The holiday was created on October 1, 1961, when Congress authorized the president to designate May 15 to honor peace officers. John F. Kennedy signed the bill into law on October 1, 1962. The proclamation signed by President Kennedy read:

87th Congress of the United States of America

H.J.Res. 730	October 1, 1962	Public Law 87-726

Joint Resolution 76 Stat. 676.

To authorize the President to proclaim May 15 of each year as Peace Officers Memorial Day and the calendar week of each year during which such May 15 occurs as Police Week.

Whereas the police officers of America have worked devotedly and selflessly in behalf of the people of this Nation, regardless of the peril or hazard to themselves; and

Whereas these officers have safeguarded the lives and property of their fellow Americans; and

Whereas by the enforcement of our laws, these same officers have given our country internal freedom from fear of the violence and civil disorder that is presently affecting other nations;

Whereas these men and women by their patriotic service and their dedicated efforts have earned the gratitude of the Republic: Now, therefore, be it

Resolved by the Senate and the House of Representatives of the United States of America in Congress assembled, That the President is authorized and requested to issue proclamations (1) designating May 15 of each year as Peace Officers Memorial Day in honor of the Federal, State, and municipal officers who have been killed or disabled in the line of duty, (2) directing the officials of the Government to display at half-staff the flag of the United States on all Government buildings on such day, as provided by section 3(m) of the Act of June 22, 1942 (Chapter 435; 56 Stat. 377; 36 U. S. C. 175), (3) designating in each year the calendar week during which such May 15 occurs as Police Week, in recognition of the service given by the men and women who, night and day, stand guard in our midst to protect us through enforcement of our laws, and (4) inviting the governments of the States and communities and the people of the United States to observe such day and week with appropriate ceremonies and activities, including the display at half-staff of the flag of the United States.

Approved October 1, 1962.

To pay tribute to the law enforcement officers who have made the ultimate sacrifice for our country and to voice our appreciation for all those who currently serve on the front lines of the battle against crime, the Congress, by a joint resolution approved October 1, 1962 (75 Stat.676), has authorized and requested the President to designate May 15 of each year as "Peace Officers Memorial Day", and the week in which it falls as "National Police Week" and by Public Law 103-322 (36 U.S.C. 175) has requested that the flag be flown at half-staff on Peace Officers' Memorial Day.

== Subsequent proclamations ==
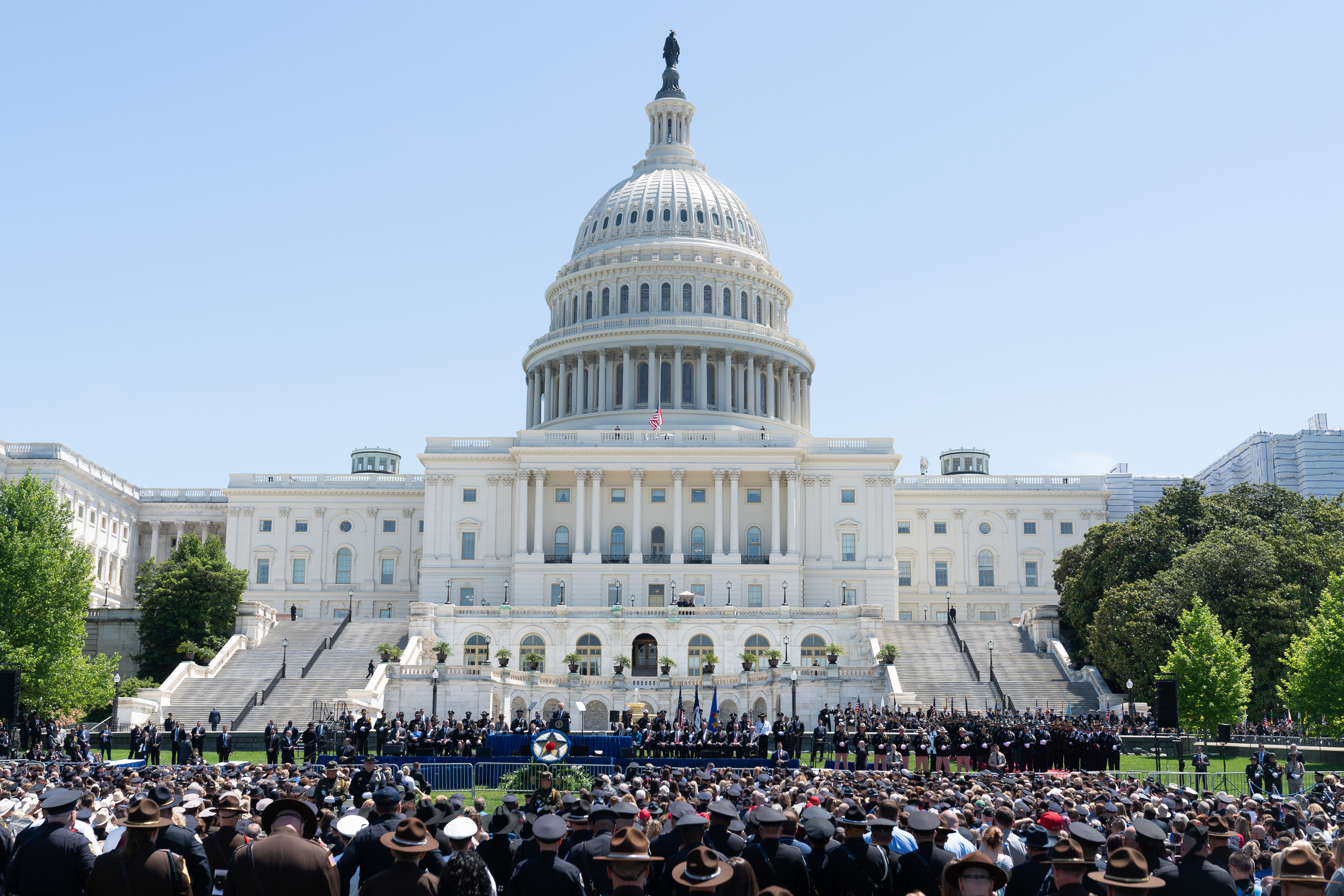
National Peace Officers' Memorial Service outside the United States Capitol on May 15, 2019

Amended in 1994, Bill Clinton, through Public Law 103-322, directed that the flag of the United States be flown at half-staff on May 15. According to a proclamation by George W. Bush in 2002,

Peace Officers Memorial Day and Police Week pay tribute to the local, State, and Federal law enforcement officers who serve and protect us with courage and dedication. These observances also remind us of the ongoing need to be vigilant against all forms of crime, especially to acts of extreme violence and terrorism.

At the National Peace Officer's Memorial Service on May 15, 2013, President Barack Obama paid tribute to fallen law enforcement officers, closing:

The 143 fallen officers we honor today put themselves on the front lines of that fight, to preserve that quality of community, and to protect the roots of our greatness. They exemplified the very idea of citizenship – that with our God-given rights come responsibilities and obligations to ourselves and to others. They embodied that idea. That's the way they died. That's how we must remember them. And that's how we must live. We can never repay our debt to these officers and their families, but we must do what we can, with all that we have, to live our lives in a way that pays tribute to their memory. That begins, but does not end, by gathering here – with heavy hearts, to carve their names in stone, so that all will know them, and that their legacy will endure. We are grateful to them and we are grateful to you.

Much of the holiday centers on the National Law Enforcement Officers Memorial wall in Washington, D.C., whose walls feature the names of more than 21,183 law enforcement officers who have been killed in the line of duty.
