= National Freedom Day =

United States observance

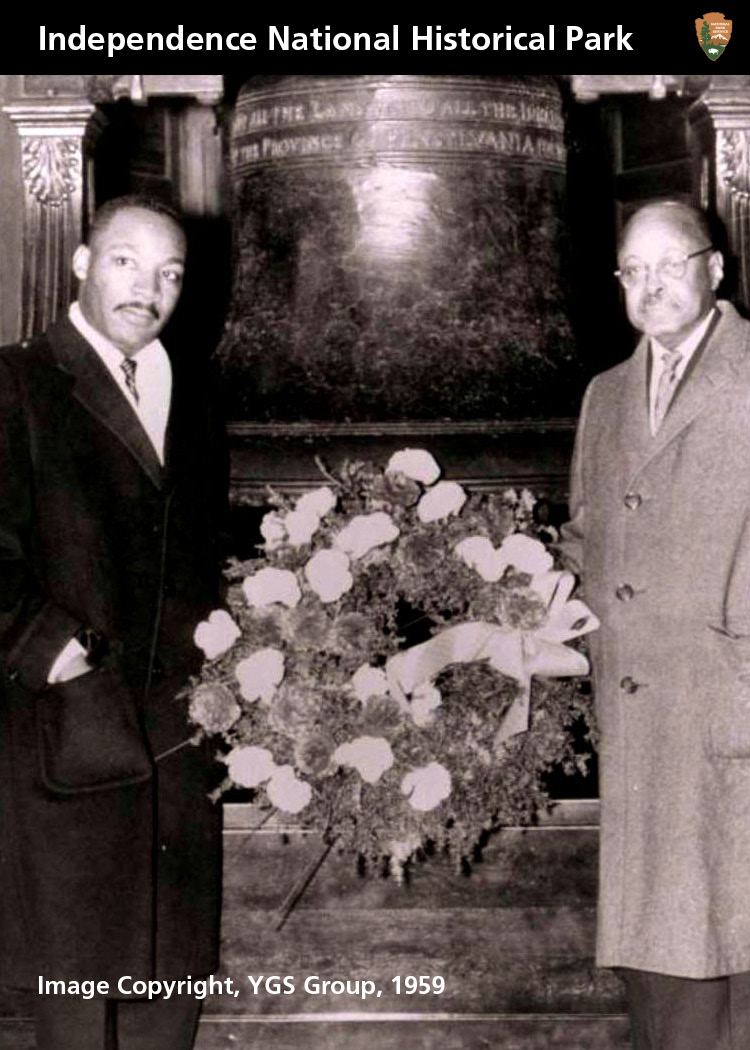
Martin Luther King Jr. and Dr. Emanuel C. Wright celebrate National Freedom Day by the Liberty Bell at Independence National Historical Park in Philadelphia in 1959

National Freedom Day is a United States observance on February 1 honoring the signing by President Abraham Lincoln of a joint House and Senate resolution that later was ratified as the 13th Amendment to the U.S. Constitution. President Lincoln signed the Amendment abolishing slavery on February 1, 1865, and it was later ratified by the states.

== History ==
In the mid-20th century, Major Richard Robert Wright Sr., born into slavery and freed after the Civil War, believed that there should be a day when freedom for all Americans is celebrated. Wright invited national and local leaders to meet in Philadelphia in order to make plans to designate February 1 as an annual memorial to the signing of the 13th Amendment to the U.S. Constitution by President Abraham Lincoln on this date. The amendment freed all U.S. slaves.

One year after Wright's death in 1947, both houses of the U.S. Congress passed a bill to make February 1 National Freedom Day. The holiday proclamation was signed into law on June 30, 1948, by President Harry Truman.

It was the forerunner to Black History Day. Later Black History Month was officially recognized in 1976. Recognition of black history had been initiated by historian Carter G. Woodson in 1926.

The President may issue each year a proclamation designating February 1 as National Freedom Day to commemorate the signing by Abraham Lincoln on February 1, 1865, of the joint resolution adopted by the Senate and the House of Representatives that proposed the 13th amendment to the Constitution.

— U.S. Code § 124 – National Freedom Day

On this day, many towns and cities have festivals. Some citizens reflect privately on the freedoms that the United States honors and to appreciate the goodwill of the United States. In Philadelphia, wreath laying at the Liberty Bell has been a tradition for many years to mark National Freedom Day. Symbols of the day may include a theme about freedom for all Americans. It is not a federal holiday.

== See also ==
- Juneteenth
