= Wright Brothers Day =

United States national observation

Wright Brothers Day (December 17) is a United States national observation. It is codified in the US Code, and commemorates the first successful flights in a heavier-than-air, mechanically propelled airplane, the Wright Flyer, that were made by Orville and Wilbur Wright on December 17, 1903, near Kitty Hawk, North Carolina. On September 21, 1959, U.S. President Dwight D. Eisenhower declared December 17 to be Wright Brothers Day pursuant to Public Law 86–304. Following a similar joint resolution enacted in 1961, the U.S. Congress made the designation permanent in 1963.

Wright Brothers Day was announced as an official commemorative day in Ohio, on October 5, 2011. Wright Brothers Day is celebrated every December 17 at the Wright Brothers National Memorial in Kill Devil Hills, N.C.

== See also ==
- National Aviation Day
