= Pan American Aviation Day =

December observance

- Date: December 17
- Next time: December 17, 2026
- Frequency: annual

Pan American Aviation Day is a United States Federal Observance Day observed December 17. According to 36 U.S.C. § 134, on Pan American Aviation Day the president calls on "all officials of the United States Government, the chief executive offices of the States, territories, and possessions of the United States, and all citizens to participate in the observance of Pan American Aviation Day to further, and stimulate interest in, aviation in the American countries as an important stimulus to the further development of more rapid communications and a cultural development between the countries of the Western Hemisphere."

The date commemorates the first successful flight of a mechanically propelled heavier-than-air craft, accomplished on December 17, 1903, by the Wright brothers near Kitty Hawk, North Carolina.
