= National Pearl Harbor Remembrance Day =

American day of commemoration

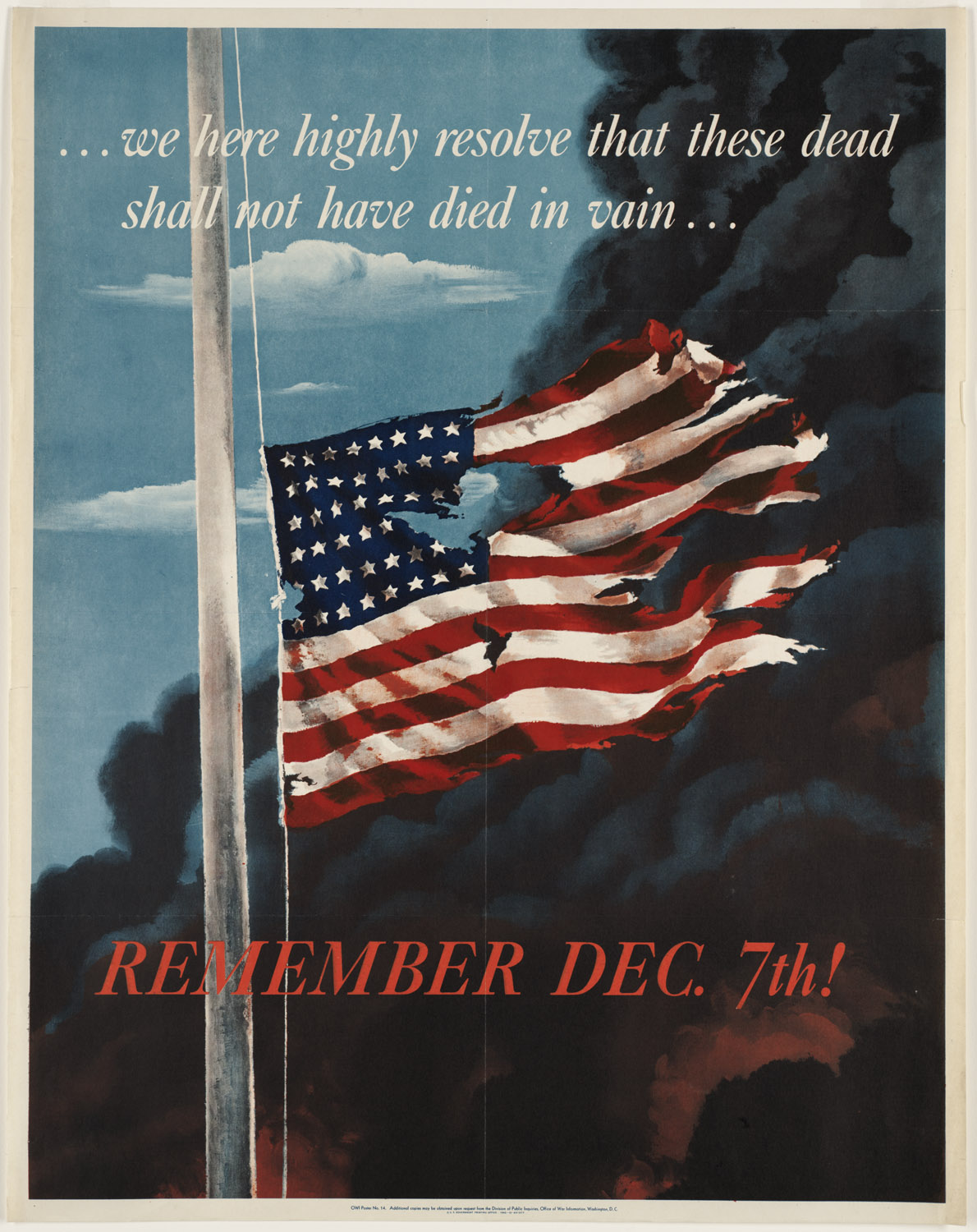
- Office of War Information poster memorializing the Pearl Harbor attack (1941)
- Date: December 7
- Frequency: Annual

National Pearl Harbor Remembrance Day, also referred to as Pearl Harbor Remembrance Day or Pearl Harbor Day, is observed annually in the United States on December 7, to remember and honor the 2,403 Americans who were killed in the Japanese surprise attack on Pearl Harbor in Hawaii on December 7, 1941, which led to the United States declaring war on Japan the next day and thus entering World War II.

In 1994, the United States Congress, by Pub. L. 103–308, 108 Stat. 1169, designated December 7 of each year as National Pearl Harbor Remembrance Day. The joint resolution was signed by President Bill Clinton on August 23, 1994. It became 36 U.S.C. § 129 (Patriotic and National Observances and Ceremonies) of the United States Code. On November 29, Clinton issued a proclamation declaring December 7, 1994, the first National Pearl Harbor Remembrance Day.

On Pearl Harbor Day, the American flag should be flown at half-staff until sunset to honor those who died as a result of the attack on U.S. military forces in Hawaii. Pearl Harbor Day is not a federal holiday – government offices, schools, and businesses do not close. Some organizations may hold special events in memory of those killed or injured at Pearl Harbor.

== Attack on Pearl Harbor ==
On Sunday morning, December 7, 1941, the Imperial Japanese Navy Air Service attacked the neutral United States at Naval Station Pearl Harbor near Honolulu, Hawaii, killing 2,403 Americans and injuring 1,178 others. The attack sank four U.S. Navy battleships and damaged four others. It also damaged three cruisers, three destroyers, and one minelayer. Aircraft losses were 188 destroyed and 159 damaged.

=== Aftermath ===
Canada declared war on Japan within hours of the attack on Pearl Harbor, the first Western nation to do so. On December 8, the United States declared war on Japan and entered World War II on the side of the Allies. In a speech to Congress, President Franklin D. Roosevelt called the bombing of Pearl Harbor "a date which will live in infamy."

== Pearl Harbor and Ford Island historic sites ==
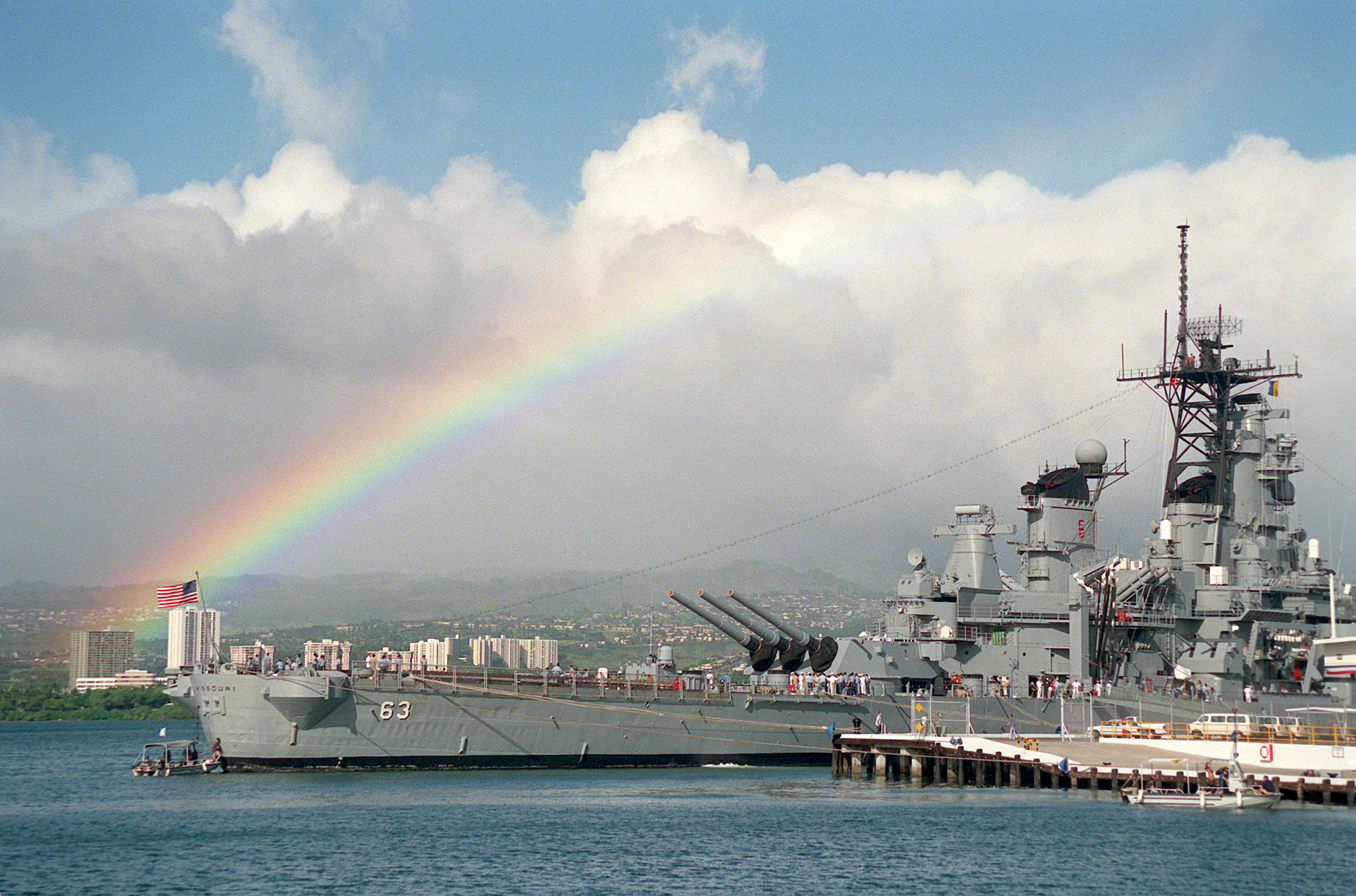
USS Missouri at the observance of the 50th anniversary of the Pearl Harbor attack (December 7, 1991)

In Pearl Harbor:

- The USS Arizona Memorial in Pearl Harbor is a marble memorial over the sunken battleship USS Arizona, which was dedicated on May 30, 1962 ("Memorial Day"), in honor of the 1,177 crew members who were killed. The memorial remembers all military personnel who were killed in the Pearl Harbor attack. Note: This site is open to the public with boat tours to the memorial provided by the US Navy from the visitors center.
- The USS Oklahoma Memorial is in remembrance of a battleship that was sunk which lost 429 men on December 7, 1941.
- The USS Utah Memorial, is in remembrance of a former battleship that had been converted to a target ship in 1931 (thus, at the time of the Pearl Harbor attack carried the designation of AG-16), that was sunk in the attack on December 7, 1941. A memorial to honor the crew including the 58 who died aboard USS Utah was dedicated on the northwest shore of Ford Island, near the ship's wreck, in 1972. The ship, along with USS Arizona, was added to the National Register of Historic Places and declared a National Historic Landmark in 1989.
- The USS Bowfin Submarine Museum and Park is in remembrance of an American submarine that sank 44 ships in World War II. Note: This site is adjacent to the USS Arizona Memorial Visitors Center.

Also on Ford Island. Note: Ford Island remains an active military installation therefore public access is restricted to approved tours, military personnel, military retirees, NOAA personnel and their family members only.

- The USS Missouri Memorial. The surrender of the Japanese on the deck of USS Missouri brought the end of World War II.
- The Pacific Aviation Museum Pearl Harbor

== Pearl Harbor tributes ==
In 1990, leading up to the 50th anniversary of the attack on Pearl Harbor, Congress established the Pearl Harbor Commemorative Medal. This is also known as the Pearl Harbor Survivor's medal and was awarded to anyone who was in the U.S. Armed Forces and who was present in Hawaii on December 7, 1941, and participated in combat operations that day against the attack. The medal was also awarded to civilians who were killed or injured in the attack. A few years later, Congress amended the law to allow any person who was present in Hawaii on December 7, 1941, and was involved in combat operations against Japanese military forces attacking Hawaii, to receive the award. In both instances, there was a limited time period to apply for the award, and it is no longer issued.

== See also ==
- Pearl Harbor Survivors Association
- World War II Valor in the Pacific National Monument
