= Charles Conway Hartigan =

U.S. Navy Medal of Honor recipient

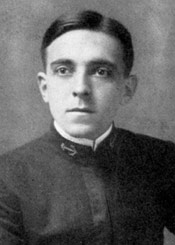
- Hartigan as a U.S. Naval Academy midshipman
- Born: September 13, 1882; Middletown, New York, US
- Died: February 25, 1944 (aged 61); Palo Alto, California, US
- Burial place: Arlington National Cemetery
- Military career
- Allegiance: United States
- Branch: United States Navy
- Service years: 1906–1941
- Rank: Rear Admiral
- Nickname: Mike
- Commands: USS Oklahoma; USS Relief; USS Cassin
- Conflicts: Battle of Veracruz (1914); World War I
- Awards: Medal of Honor

Charles Conway Hartigan (September 13, 1882 – February 25, 1944) was born in Middletown, New York and died in Palo Alto, California. He graduated from the United States Naval Academy in 1906.

He received the Medal of Honor for actions at the United States occupation of Veracruz. He was a veteran of World War I and commanded the ill-fated USS Oklahoma (BB-37) from 1937 to 1939.

== Biography ==
Hartigan was born in Middletown, New York on September 13, 1882, and raised in Norwich, New York.

Hartigan was promoted to lieutenant on July 1, 1912. From 1913 to 1915, he served aboard the battleship South Carolina.

Hartigan was promoted to lieutenant commander on July 1, 1917, and then received a temporary promotion to commander on July 1, 1918. After the World War I armistice, he commanded the destroyer Cassin from January to April 1919. His promotion to commander was made permanent on December 31, 1921.

From 1929 to 1932, Hartigan served as naval attaché in Peiping, China. He was promoted to captain on June 4, 1931. Hartigan was given command of the hospital ship Relief from August 1932 to June 1934. He attended the Naval War College before serving as commander of the battleship Oklahoma.

Hartigan retired from active duty on June 30, 1941, and was advanced to rear admiral on the retired list. After retirement, he continued to work at the Navy Department in Washington, D.C. until he suffered a heart attack on December 7, 1941.

Hartigan suffered from ill health for the remainder of his life. In October 1943, he traveled to Palo Alto, California to aid his recuperation. He died there on February 25, 1944. He was buried in Arlington National Cemetery with full military honors on March 2, 1944.

== Medal of Honor citation ==
Rank: Lieutenant

Organization: U.S. Navy

Born: 9/13/1882, Middletown, NY

Accredited to: Norwich, NY

Date of issue: 12/04/1915

Citation

For distinguished conduct in battle, engagement of Vera Cruz, 22 April 1914. During the second day's fighting the service performed by him was eminent and conspicuous. He was conspicuous for the skillful handling of his company under heavy rifle and machinegun fire, for which conduct he was commended by his battalion commander.

== Family ==
On May 6, 1910, Hartigan married Margaret Alden Thompson (June 21, 1887 – May 15, 1974) in Benicia, California. His wife's older sister was writer Kathleen Norris.

Hartigan and his wife had a daughter and a son. In 1933, their daughter Margaret Alden Hartigan married James Alexander Barclay Barton, the eldest son of British diplomat Sidney Barton. Their son Charles Conway Hartigan Jr. (August 22, 1915 – May 26, 1978) was a 1938 Naval Academy graduate who retired from the Navy as a captain. During World War II, he was serving as gunnery officer on the destroyer Hammann when she was sunk by a Japanese torpedo during the Battle of Midway and subsequently received a Silver Star for his actions.

== See also ==
- List of Medal of Honor recipients (Veracruz)
- List of United States Naval Academy alumni (Medal of Honor)
