= USS England =

USS England has been the name of two ships in the United States Navy. Both were named for Ensign John C. England.

- USS England (DE-635) was commissioned in 1943 and decommissioned in 1945. She is best known for finding and destroying 6 Japanese submarines in 12 days during May 1944.
- USS England (DLG-22)/(CG-22) was a guided missile cruiser, was commissioned on 7 December 1963, and decommissioned on 21 January 1994.
