= List of commanding officers of USS Oklahoma (BB-37) =

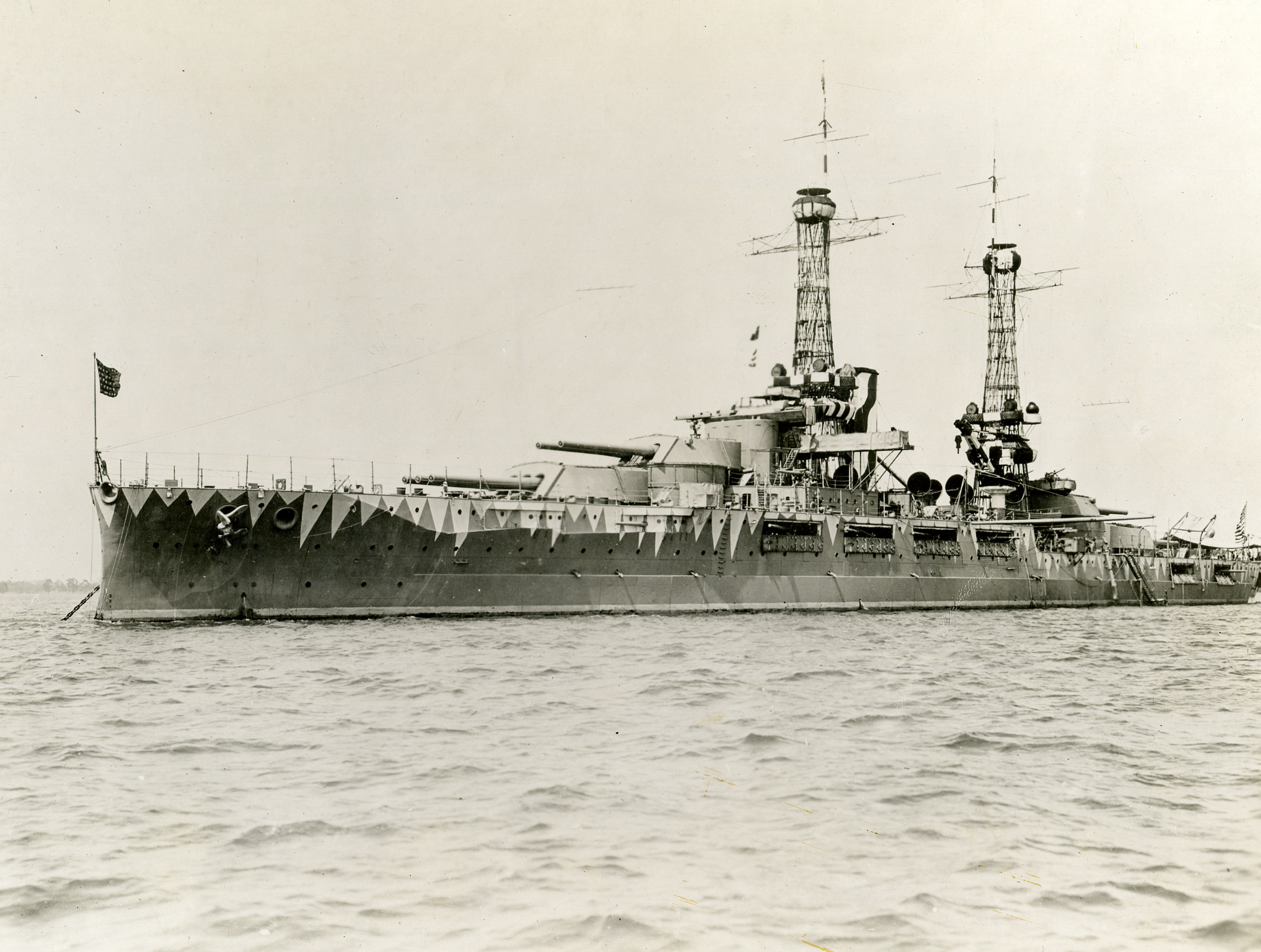
USS Oklahoma wearing experimental camouflage, circa 1917.

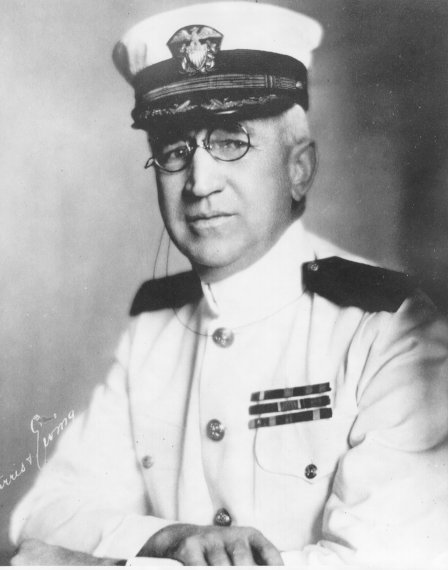
Edwin Taylor Pollock captained the USS Oklahoma from 5 July 1921 to 13 January 1922.

USS Oklahoma was a battleship that served in the United States Navy from 2 May 1916, to 1 September 1944. The ship capsized and sank during the attack on Pearl Harbor on 7 December 1941, but she was righted in 1943. While other ships sunk during the Pearl Harbor attack were repaired and returned to service, she was not and never returned to duty. Instead, Oklahoma was stripped of guns and superstructure, and sold for scrap. She sank while under tow to the mainland on 17 May 1947, 500 miles (800 km) northeast of Hawaii.

When Navy personnel receive orders to take command of a ship in the United States they will receive an order from the Chief of Naval Personnel stating: "Proceed to the port in which USS [name of ship] may be and upon arrival, report to your immediate superior in command, if present, otherwise by message, for duty as commanding officer of USS [name of ship]." In the 1990 edition of the United States Navy Regulations Article 0807 states that before leaving his command the commanding officer or CO will inspect the ship with the new CO and have the crew perform some sort of drill or exercise, "unless conditions render it impracticable or inadvisable." Also, before the old commanding officer leaves the ship he should turn over all keys to the incoming CO. Before the CO leaves the ship he is entitled to a say a few words and, according to Naval regulations "the officer relieved, though without authority after turning over the command, is, until final departure, entitled to all ceremonies and distinctions accorded a commanding officer."

During her nearly three decades of service, the Oklahoma had 22 commanding officers. The first Captain was Roger Welles, who took command after Oklahoma's commissioning in 1916, serving over a year. The longest serving commanding officer was John D. Wainwright, who served over for over two years in the position, from 13 May 1930 – 25 June 1932. Oklahoma's last commanding officer was Howard D. Bode, although he was not on board when the battleship was sunk at Pearl Harbor. When the Japanese attacked, Bode was on the USS Maryland and Commander Jesse L. Kenworthy Jr., acting as the ship's captain, gave the order to abandon ship.

== Commanding officers ==
Name	Years of Service	Total time (Note: Approximate time in months)	Rank	Details
Roger Welles	2 May 1916 – 6 June 1917	13 months	Captain	Roger Welles was the first commander of Oklahoma after her commissioning in 1916. A former commander of the Naval Training Center in Newport, his command of the ship was a short period of time mainly involving the command of the ship as a training ship. This was because the oil-fired boilers that she used were not able to be fueled in England, as German U-boats had drained their supply. After he gave command over to Rear Admiral Spencer K. Wood, he was appointed the head of the Office of Naval Intelligence.
Spencer S. Wood	6 June 1917 – 1 February 1918	8 months	Rear Admiral	Rear Admiral Spencer S. Wood held the position of commander of the Oklahoma in about the same situation as his predecessor. His time on ship was spent managing training and undergoing a refit of the ship, in which it gained more anti-aircraft defenses and the repositioning of her 5 inches (130 mm) guns. Before his time as the commanding officer, he had been on the General Board of the United States Navy and Flag Secretary to J.S. Walker. After his time on Oklahoma, he was the commander of the 1st Division of the Pacific Fleet.
Edward T. Constein	1 February 1918 – 18 February 1918	17 days	Commander	Edward T. Constein held command of the Oklahoma for eighteen days, all of which were spent as a training ship. His posts before and after his time on Oklahoma are not known.
MacGillivray Milne	18 February 1918 – 1 March 1918	10 days	Commander	Commander MacGillivray Milne also served on the Oklahoma for eighteen days, during which he served as the commander of the ship in preparation for her to be sent overseas, although the ship was still a training ship. In 1934, Captain Milne commanded the Arizona, which collided with a fishing boat. After being found at fault by a court martial, Milne resigned from the navy. In 1936, Milne became the Governor of American Samoa, a post he held for two years. Milne died in 1959.
Mark L. Bristol	2 March 1918 – 14 October 1918	7 months	Captain	Mark L. Bristol held command of the Oklahoma during and after her transit to Berehaven Harbour in Ireland. The remainder of the time was spent in port at Berehaven Harbour, as the German High Seas Fleet was also held inside port. Before his time on Oklahoma, Bristol served as Director of Naval Aeronautics.
Charles B. McVay Jr.	14 October 1918 – 9 July 1919	9 months	Captain	Charles B. McVay, Jr. was commander of the Oklahoma for 9 months. On his first day of command, the Oklahoma set out to protect Allied troop convoys going to Britain, a task that took two days. After the Armistice, the Oklahoma sailed back to the United States with the remainder of BatDiv 5 and BatDiv 6. In 1929, McKay was promoted to Admiral and commanded the United States Asiatic Fleet. He retired in 1932 and died in 1949.
Noble E. Irwin	9 July 1919 – 5 July 1921	2 years	Captain	Noble E. Irwin served on the Oklahoma for two years, all of which were spent in peacetime. During this period, the Oklahoma was modernized and prepared for the Great Cruise of 1925, similar to the Great White Fleet in 1909. Before his command on Oklahoma he was on the Martial Board of the Office of the Chief of Naval Operations. Rear Admiral Irwin became Commandant of the 15th Naval District in March 1931 and retired in 1933.
Edwin T. Pollock	5 July 1921 – 13 January 1922	7 months	Captain	Edwin Taylor Pollock served in several positions before the Oklahoma, rising steadily from an Ensign during the Spanish–American War to the Superintendent of the U.S. Naval Observatory and eighth Naval Governor of American Samoa. His time on the Oklahoma, however, was not an adventurous one, spent mainly in port.
Stephen V. Graham	13 January 1922 – 4 July 1923	1 year 7 months	Captain	Stephen Victor Graham's time on Oklahoma was in preparation for the Great Cruise, which would occur two years later. He, too, became Governor of American Samoa and later a professor at the United States Naval Academy. He retired as a Rear Admiral in 1931.
W. Pitt Scott	4 July 1923 – 15 June 1925	11 months	Captain	As an Ensign, W. Pitt Scott has served on the Olympia when she was Admiral George Dewey's flagship at the Battle of Manila Bay. Scott commanded the Oklahoma for about two years. The last two months of those were part of the Great Cruise. He relinquished command when the ship was anchored in Hawaii.
Willis McDowell	15 June 1925 – 5 May 1927	23 months	Captain	Willis McDowell held command of the Oklahoma for the remainder of the Great Cruise, when the ship stopped in several Pacific ports. As the ship exited the Panama Canal in 1927 after the Great Cruise, he gave command to T.A. Kearny. McDowell went on the command the Washington Navy Yard. He died in 1944.
T.A. Kearny	5 May 1927 – 10 December 1928	20 months	Captain	T.A. Kearny was commander of the Oklahoma during her two-year refitting at the Philadelphia Navy Yard, which she began in September 1927. His posts before and after are not known.
J.F. Hellweg	10 December 1928 – 13 May 1930	17 months	Captain	J.F. Hellweg took command during peacetime, and like preceding and succeeding commanders, participated in naval exercises. Before the Oklahoma, Hellweg commanded the USS Ostfriesland until her tests in 1921. Hellweg eventually served as Superintendent of the U.S. Naval Observatory.
John D. Wainwright	13 May 1930 – 25 June 1932	2 years	Captain	John D. Wainwright commanded the Oklahoma for two years, which being in peacetime were uneventful. His posts before and after the two-year period are not known.
Henry D. Cooke	25 June 1932 – 1 May 1934	23 months	Captain	Henry D. Cooke commanded the Oklahoma for two years, which were in peacetime and were uneventful. Following his command, he commanded the USS Melville and was Chief of Staff of the Naval Commandant of the U.S. Naval Academy for three years. He retired a Rear Admiral.
W. R. Van Auken	1 May 1934 – 1 November 1935	18 months	Captain	W.R. Van Auken commanded the Oklahoma during peacetime, thus his command was uneventful. His posts before and after his command of the Oklahoma are not known.
William Alden Hall	1 November 1935 – 25 June 1937	19 months	Captain	William Alden Hall commanded the Oklahoma for two years, including part of the start of the Spanish Civil War. His posts before and after are not known.
Charles C. Hartigan	25 June 1937 – 21 December 1938	18 months	Captain	Taking command in the middle of the 1937 Midshipmen cruise, in which Oklahoma was participating, Charles C. Hartigan helped command refugee evacuations from Spain during the Spanish Civil War. He had received the Medal of Honor in 1914 for actions during the United States occupation of Veracruz.
T.S. McCloy	21 December 1938 – 30 January 1939	2 months	Captain	T.S. McCloy held command of the ship for only a month, and during all of this time he commanded the ship in naval exercises, just missing the end of the Spanish Civil War. His posts before and after his Oklahoma command are not known.
Emmanuel L. Lofquist	30 January 1939 – 24 June 1940	18 months	Captain	Emmanuel L. Lofquist held command of the Oklahoma for about a year and a half. During this time, she participated in naval exercises in the Pacific. After commanding the Oklahoma, he became Chief of Staff of the Ninth Naval District at Great Lakes, Illinois.
Edward J. Foy	24 June 1940 – 31 October 1941	16 months	Captain	Edward J. Foy commanded the Oklahoma for more than a year, mainly involving training exercises. Before Oklahoma, he commanded evacuations from Spain during the Spanish Civil War. He was relieved of command after a collision with a barge.
Howard D. Bode	1 November 1941 – 7:30 am, 7 December 1941	1 month	Captain	Captain Bode was given command after Foy was relieved. His time was spent in naval exercises in the Pacific Ocean, and he finished his command at 7:30 am on 7 December 1941, when he left the ship to board the Maryland. He was aboard her when Oklahoma capsized. At the Battle of Savo Island, Captain Bode commanded USS Chicago (CA-29). After the battle, upon learning that he was to be censured for his actions, Captain Bode shot himself on 19 April 1943.

== See also ==
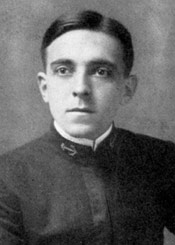
Charles Hartigan as a U.S. Naval Academy midshipman. He commanded the Oklahoma 25 June 1937 – 21 December 1938.

- Nevada-class battleship
