= Pearl Harbor Survivors Association =

Organization

Pearl Harbor Survivors logo

The Pearl Harbor Survivors Association (PHSA), founded in 1958 and recognized by the United States Congress in 1985, was a World War II veterans organization whose members were on Pearl Harbor or three miles or less offshore during the Japanese attack on Pearl Harbor, on December 7, 1941. The PHSA was officially disbanded at the end of December 2011 with a membership of about 2,700 members nationally.

The PHSA, which was incorporated in the State of Missouri, held Federal Charter 99-119 under Title 36 of the United States Code. The PHSA National Insignia bearing the name Pearl Harbor Survivors Association was registered at the U.S. Patent Office. The PHSA's motto read:

Remember Pearl Harbor—Keep America Alert!

== History ==
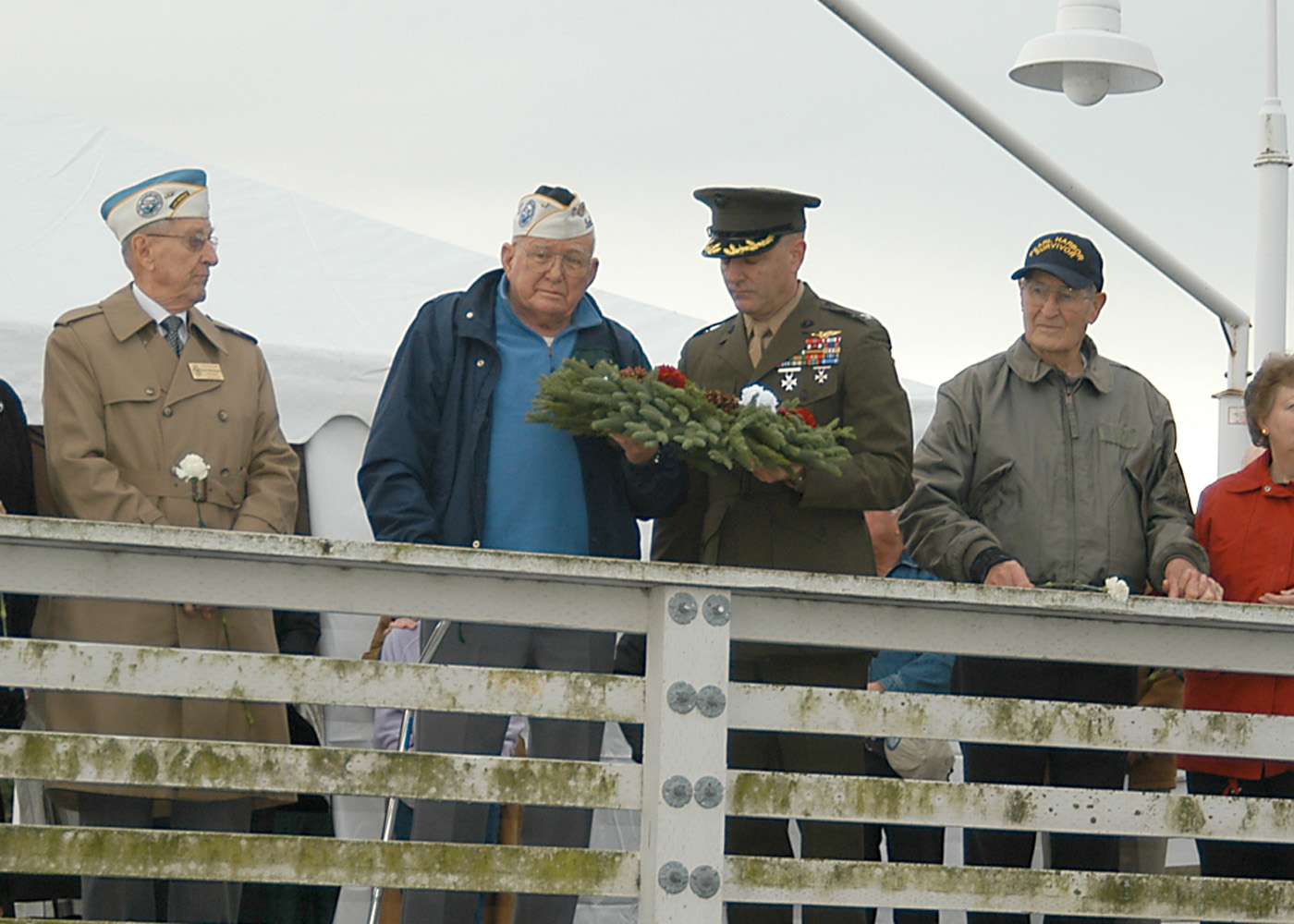
PHSA members prepare to lay a commemorative wreath at NAS Whidbey Island, December 7, 2006

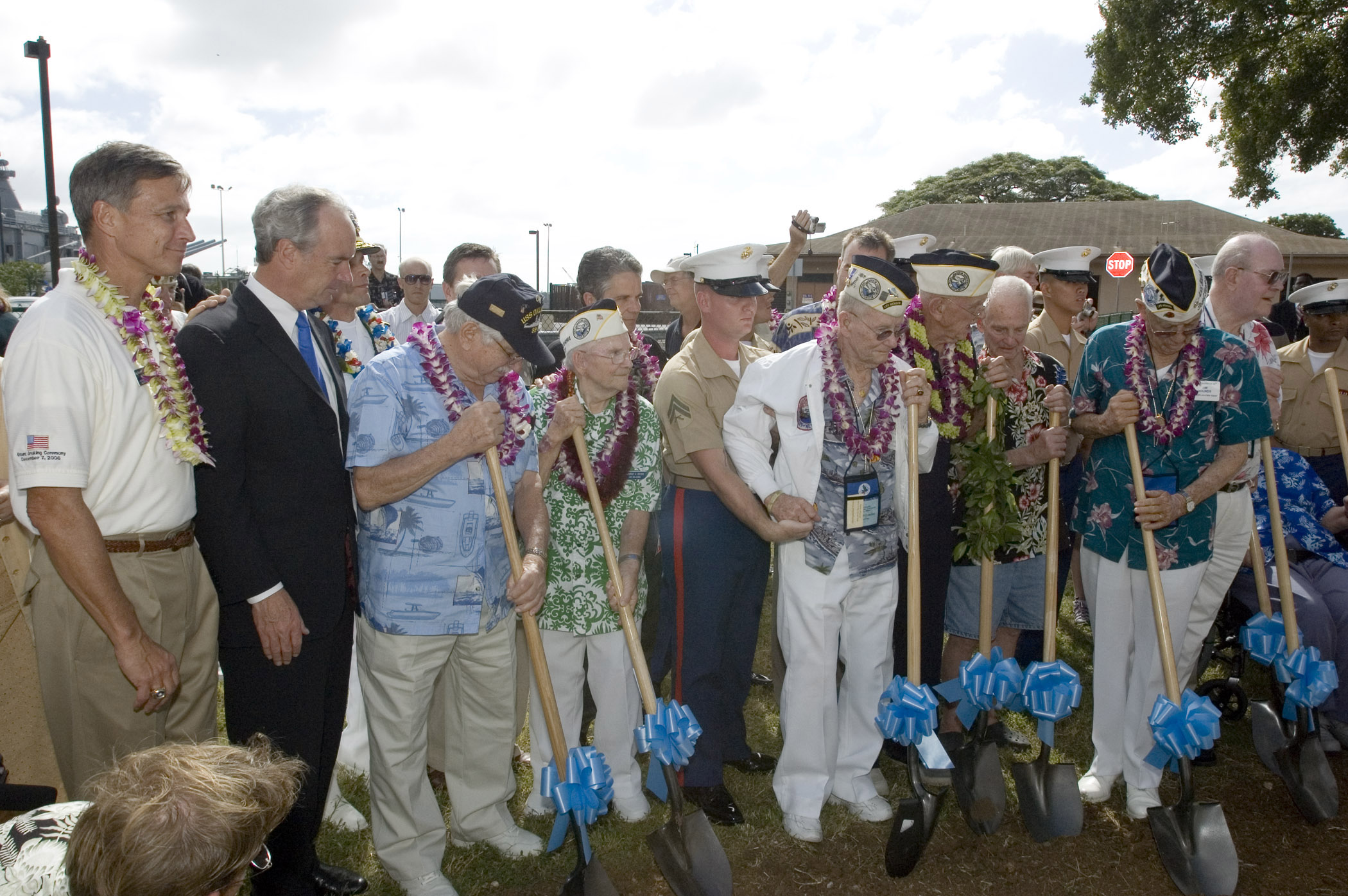
PHSA members break ground for a USS Oklahoma memorial, December 7, 2006

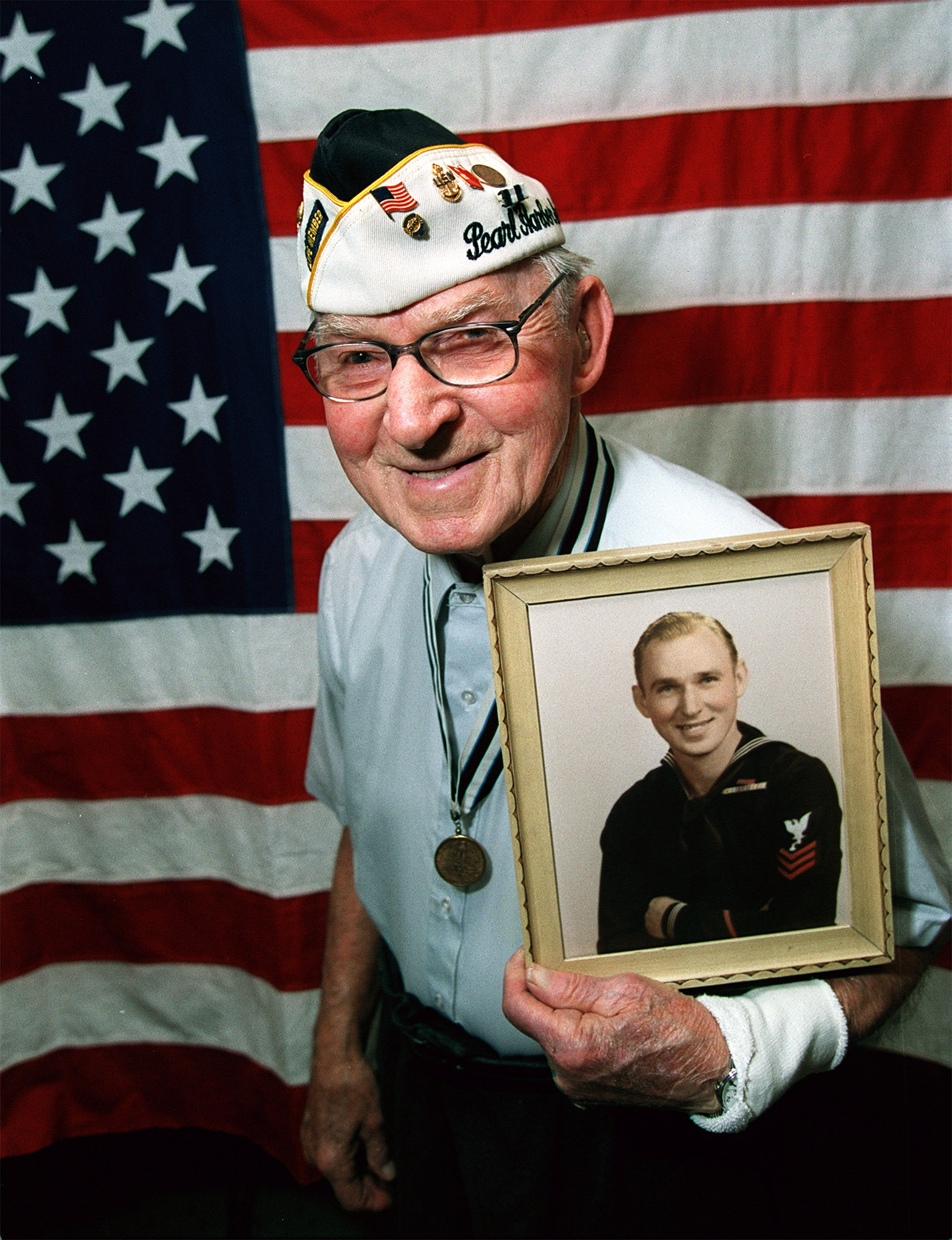
PHSA member Steve Sawzin from Lorain, Ohio, in a photo taken in 2001.

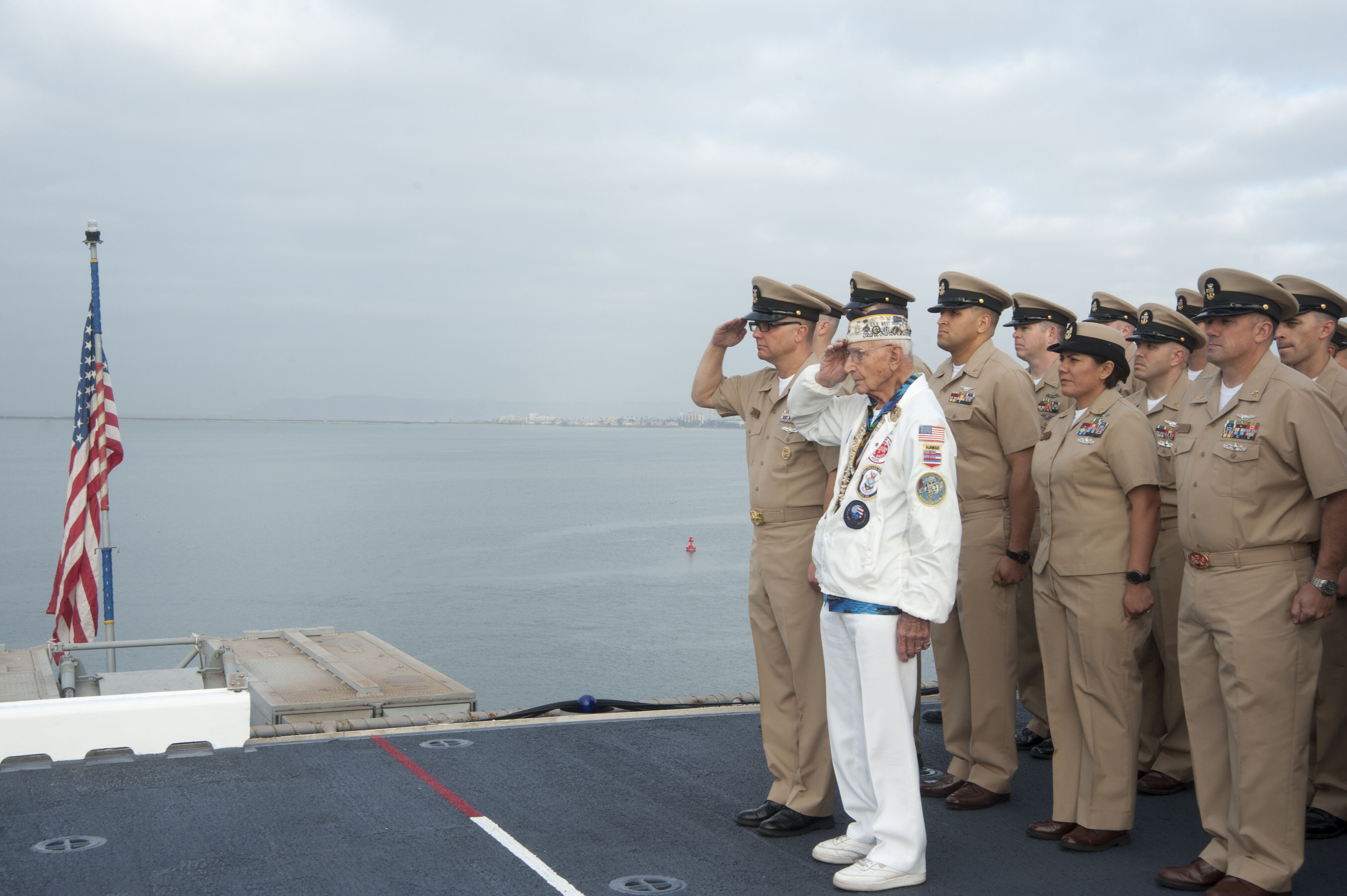
Stuart Hedley in April 2016

The first meeting of what would become the Pearl Harbor Survivors Association (PHSA) took place on December 7, 1954 at the Del Camino Room in Gardena, California where eleven survivors of the attack gathered to remember their fallen comrades and dear friends. It was at this first meeting that those in attendance swore that they would make the commemoration an annual event.

At the association's official founding dinner in 1958 with thirteen survivors present, the eleven survivors who were present at the 1954 meeting were proclaimed the Founding Fathers of the Pearl Harbor Survivors Association. Those eleven survivors were: Clarence Bonn, Mark Ferris, George Haines Jr. Edward Kronberger, Robert Kronberger, Samuel Kronberger, Raymond LeBer, George Schafer, Louis P. Smith, Ed Steffa, and James C. Taneyhill. Following the 1958 meeting, the members began searching for other military survivors of the Pearl Harbor attack.

A dinner of the group on December 7, 1960, led to the first Pearl Harbor Survivors Association National Reunion at the Disneyland Hotel in Anaheim, California where over 300 survivors joined in commemoration of the event on December 7, 1961. President John F. Kennedy sent his personal representative to this convention. Over 1,000 survivors attended the PHSA National Reunion held at the Lafayette Hotel in Long Beach, California on December 7–8, 1962. At this meeting, the Pearl Harbor Survivors Association constitution was presented and ratified by the members. Mark Ferris, who initiated the group's first meeting in 1954, after visiting a reunion held for members of the battleship USS West Virginia (BB-48), was chosen as the PHSA's first national president. Also, an official PHSA prayer to be said at association reunions was adopted. In October 1964, the PHSA issued its first quarterly newsletter to its members named the Pearl Harbor-Gram. After the national reunion was held in Hawaii, December 4–10, 1966 in honor of the 25th anniversary of the attack on Pearl Harbor, the national reunion was to be held bi-annually on even numbered years only (the state chapters reunions would be on the odd number years).

The organization was incorporated under the laws of the State of Missouri and the PHSA National Insignia was registered in Washington D.C. An official PHSA flag containing the PHSA's national insignia which shows an American bald eagle in flight holding a large bomb in its claws within a large circle, was made available for association members in April 1966.

On February 24, 1996, 73 PHSA members attended the christening and launching of the USS Pearl Harbor (LSD-52) at the Avondale Shipyard located on the west bank of the Mississippi River near New Orleans, Louisiana. The arriving members were greeted by many naval officers including Admiral Jeremy "Mike" Boorda, the Chief of Naval Operations. The members were introduced to the over 600 other military and civilian honorees in attendance who also were invited. At the 1998 PHSA's National Convention in Las Vegas, a PHSA Scholarship program was adopted. A scholarship was open to any U.S. citizen who is a direct descendant of a PHSA member or deceased member, including step or adopted children.

On December 7, 2011, during the 70th anniversary ceremony in Hawaii of the attack on Pearl Harbor ("Pearl Harbor Day"), William Muehleib, the President of the PHSA, announced that due to the ages and health of the 2,700 members, the executive board had decided to terminate the corporate association as of December 31 of that year. The Pearl Harbor-Gram closed its membership in February 2012. However, informal social and local activities involving Pearl Harbor survivors were to continue. Peak membership for the association was 18,000 members nationally and over 70,000 members worldwide.

=== Qualification for membership ===
- Member of the U.S. Armed Forces on December 7, 1941.
- Must have been on station at the time of the Japanese attack on Pearl Harbor, or on the island of Oahu, or off shore, not to exceed three (3) miles.
- Must have received an honorable discharge or received a discharge under honorable conditions.
- Must not be a member or ever become a member of the Communist party, or any subversive organization which advocates the overthrow of the United States Government.

== Sons and Daughters of Pearl Harbor Survivors ==
A proposal was introduced at the Pearl Harbor Survivors Association National Reunion in Clearwater, Florida, on December 6, 1965, for an organization of the descendants of Pearl Harbor survivors. This was followed by a second proposal during the association's following reunion at New York City on December 6, 1970, where it was approved. The first chapter (Sunshine State Chapter 1) of the Sons and Daughters of Pearl Harbor Survivors (SDPHS) was founded on December 6, 1972, in St. Petersburg, Florida. On October 20, 1973, the SDPHS became an independent nationwide organization. The non-profit organization has over 3,500 members in 50 states and foreign countries. The group also allows associate membership.

== PHSA plaques ==
- USS Arizona Memorial - A plaque was dedicated during the PHSA's first National Reunion in Hawaii (the 25th anniversary of the attack on Pearl Harbor) in December 1966.
- U.S. Naval Academy - At the U.S. Naval Academy in Annapolis, Maryland, a wall memorial in Alumni Hall is reserved by the PHSA to commemorate those who were killed during the Japanese attack on Pearl Harbor.

== Notable members ==
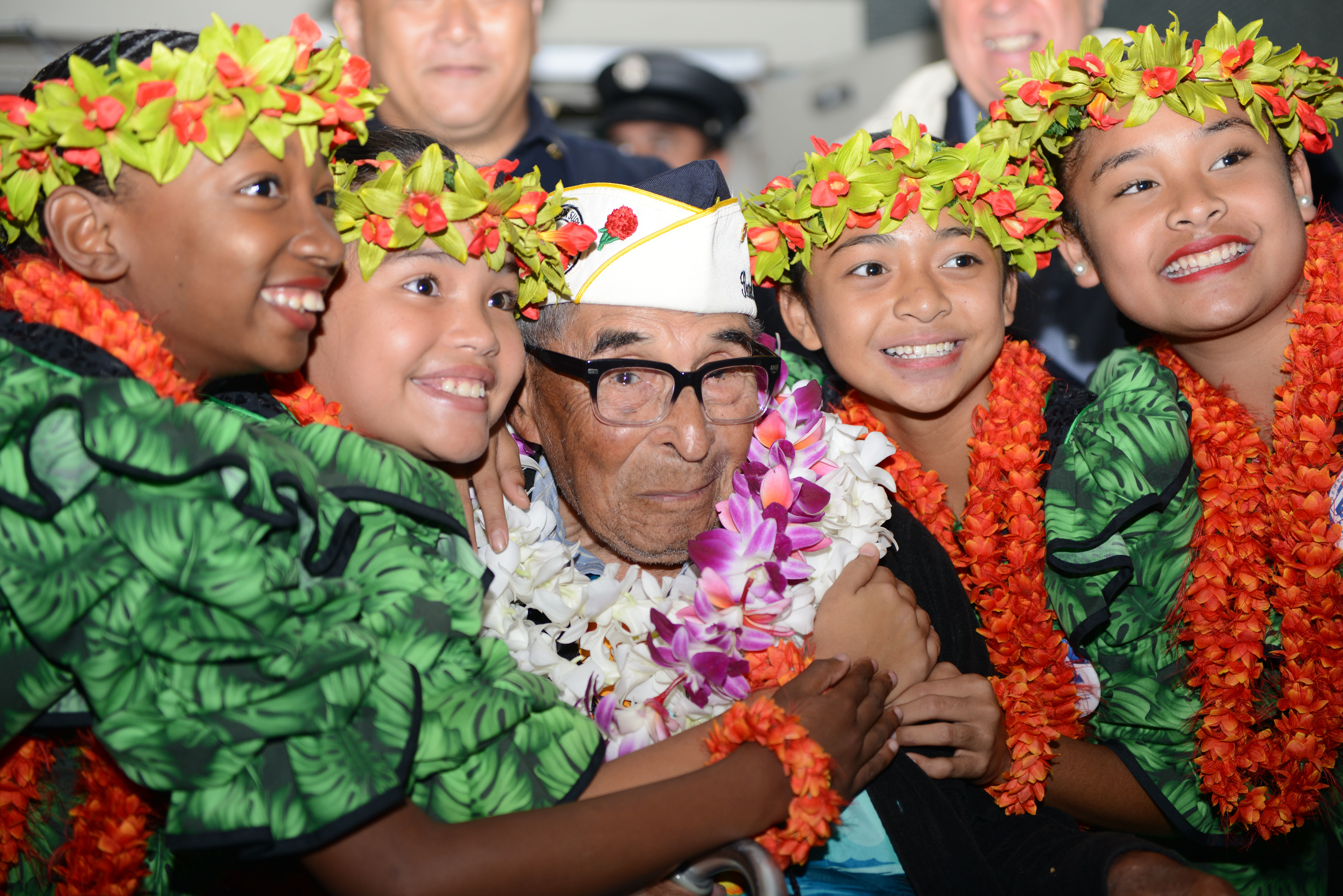
Ray Chavez, the oldest surviving Pearl Harbor veteran, at age 104 (December 2016)

- Ray Chavez — Former oldest living Pearl Harbor association member, until his death at age 106 in November 2018.
- Elvis Presley — Became an honorary member of the PHSA, Silver State (Nevada) Chapter 2 on December 15, 1965, and was presented a PHSA plaque for his contribution in helping get the USS Arizona Memorial started in 1961.

== Pearl Harbor Commemorative Medal ==
The Pearl Harbor Commemorative Medal, also known as the Pearl Harbor Survivor’s Medal, is a 1.5 inch bronze medal (no attached ribbon) which was established by the United States Congress on November 5, 1990 (P.L. 101-510, 104 Stat. 1721) in memory of the 50th anniversary in 1991 of the attack on Pearl Harbor. The medal was issued from February 1, 1991 to December 6, 1993. The circular medal was not designed for or allowed to be worn or displayed on uniforms etc.

Requirements: "a person must have been a member of the Armed Forces of the United States who was present in Hawaii on December 7, 1941, and who participated in combat operations that day against Japanese military forces attacking Hawaii. A person who was killed or wounded in that attack shall be deemed to have participated in the combat operations." The presentation of the medals was to be as "close as feasible to the fiftieth anniversary of the attack on Pearl Harbor."

On September 23, 1996, Congress authorized (P.L. 104-201, 110 Stat. 2654) anyone who would have qualified for the medal other than the requirement for membership in the Armed Forces to receive the award (i.e. civilians who were not killed or injured but can show that they were present in Hawaii on December 7, 1941, and participated in combat operations against the attack). In both instances, there was a 12-month certification window, therefore, the award is no longer issued. In both instances the next-of-kin of deceased persons eligible for the award were authorized to apply (using DD 2567 form) for the medal (one medal per eligible person).

Front side (Battleship): REMEMBER PEARL HARBOR - DECEMBER 7, 1941 - ACT OF CONGRESS 1990
Back side (Eagle): FOR THOSE WHO SERVED - "A DATE WHICH WILL LIVE IN INFAMY"

== See also ==
- National Pearl Harbor Remembrance Day
