= Pearl Harbor Commemorative Medal =

- Description: Bronze commemorative medal honoring individuals present in Hawaii on December 7, 1941, who participated in combat operations against the attacking Imperial Japanese military forces
- Country: United States
- Presented by: United States Congress
- Status: Concluded

The Pearl Harbor Commemorative Medal, also known as the Pearl Harbor Survivor’s Medal, is a bronze commemorative medal which was established by the United States Congress on November 5, 1990 (P.L. 101–510, 104 Stat. 1721).

== Eligibility and amendments ==
To have been eligible for the award, "a person must have been a member of the Armed Forces of the United States who was present in Hawaii on December 7, 1941, and who participated in combat operations that day against Imperial Japanese military forces attacking Hawaii. A person who was killed or wounded in that attack shall be deemed to have participated in the combat operations."

On September 23, 1996, Congress authorized (P.L. 104–201, 110 Stat. 2654) anyone who would have qualified for the medal other than the requirement for membership in the Armed Forces to receive the award. (i.e. civilians who were not killed or injured but can show that they were present in Hawaii on December 7, 1941, and participated in combat operations against the attack).

In both instances, there was a 12-month certification window, therefore, the award is no longer issued. In both instances the next-of-kin of deceased persons eligible for the award were authorized to apply for the medal (one medal per eligible person).

The medal is 1.5" in diameter and is non-portable (not designed to be worn on clothing).

== See also ==
- Attack on Pearl Harbor
- National Pearl Harbor Remembrance Day
- Pearl Harbor Survivors Association
