= John C. England =

United States Navy officer

- Born: December 11, 1920; Harris, Missouri, US
- Died: December 7, 1941 (aged 20); Pearl Harbor
- Military career
- Allegiance: United States of America
- Branch: United States Navy
- Service years: 1940–1941
- Rank: Ensign
- Unit: USS Oklahoma (BB-37)
- Conflicts: World War II: Attack on Pearl Harbor †

Ensign John Charles England (December 11, 1920 – December 7, 1941) was an officer in the United States Navy. He died on USS Oklahoma after it was torpedoed and sank in the Japanese Empire's attack on Pearl Harbor. The circumstances of his death have been described as heroic, and he is the namesake of two U.S. Navy vessels. He was also awarded a Purple Heart. His remains were identified and returned home after seven decades and an intense inquiry.

== Biography ==
Born in Harris, Missouri on December 11, 1920, John Charles England (Note: "The future Navy Ensign was always fascinated with the military and among his dreams was to one day actually serve on the ship for which the state that he considered his home was named, the Battleship USS Oklahoma. His family then moved to Alhambra, California.") was first raised in Oklahoma City and moved to Alhambra, California in his youth. He and his sister Lennie England (Bemiss) attended Alhambra High School. In 1938 he was elected president of his graduating class. In high school, he was a member of the "Light and Shadow" drama club, acted in a senior play, and Senior Hi-Y. After graduation, he then attended Pasadena City College in Pasadena, California, matriculating in 1940. He had many extracurricular activities. (Note: As a member of the Players Guild he was in the cast of their annual fall presentation of "Bachelor Born." He was a Pep Commission Yell King. He had membership in Delta Psi Omega, a national honorary dramatics fraternity performing in their annual spring production, written in 1923, Outward Bound.)

England enlisted as an Apprentice Seaman in the United States Naval Reserve at Los Angeles on September 6, 1940. He received active duty training on board USS New York from November 25 to December 21, 1940, and then attended Naval Reserve Midshipman's School, New York, N.Y. On March 6, 1941, he was appointed Midshipman, USNR, completing his training and commissioned Ensign, USNR, on June 6.

Ensign England was next assigned duty under instruction at the Naval Radio School, Connecticut, before joining USS Oklahoma at Pearl Harbor in September.

In early December, England anticipated the arrival of his wife (Helen Elaine England, "Lennie"), along with their three-week-old daughter (Victoria Louise England), who he never saw. In December 1941 his wife and daughter were scheduled to arrive in Oahu.

Four days before his 21st birthday, on December 7, 1941, England volunteered to work in the ship's radio room, trading with a friend so that he could spend time with his family upon their arrival. At 7:00 a.m., the Japanese attacked Pearl Harbor — USS Oklahoma was a prime target. Moored at Battleship Row 7, outboard and alongside USS Maryland, Oklahoma took three devastating torpedo hits as the first Japanese bombs fell. About to capsize, two more torpedoes struck, and her men were strafed as they abandoned ship. Within 20 minutes, she swung over and capsized — her turtling halted only when her masts touched bottom, with her starboard hull above water and some of her keel clear.

England survived the attack. Amidst smoke and flame, disregarding concerns for his personal survival and safety, "the young officer refused to leave without helping others trapped in the depths of the battleship." Despite the order to "abandon ship", he returned three times into the ship and back to the radio room, saving three shipmates. He died during a fourth attempt. (Note: "429 officers and enlisted men abroad the battleship were killed or went missing and 32 were wounded. Many others were trapped in the capsized hull and were saved in heroic efforts by men such as Julio DeCastro, a civilian yard worker who organized a team that rescued 32 USS Oklahoma sailors. Ensign John C. England was another valiant soldier who initially survived the attack, but eventually lost his life after returning to the burning ship to rescue three men who were in the radio room. Two U.S. Navy ships are named after Ensign England.")

England's family learned of his death via a postal telegram sent by Admiral Chester Nimitz.

Unlike James R. Ward and Francis C. Flaherty, who were awarded the Medal of Honor for their actions on USS Oklahoma, England received only a Purple Heart award. He was, however, honored by the naming of two ships after him.

== Burials ==
England's remains were recovered in 1949. He and four others were buried together as unidentified at the Punchbowl Cemetery, more formally called the National Memorial Cemetery of the Pacific in Hawaii.

A total of 429 crewmen were killed aboard the USS Oklahoma. According to the Department of Defense, "no single vessel at Pearl Harbor, with the exception of the USS Arizona, suffered as many fatalities." From December 1941 through June 1944, Navy personnel recovered the remains of those who perished, interring them in the Halawa and Nu’uanu Cemeteries in Hawaii. In September 1947, the remains were disinterred by the American Graves Registration Service, and transferred to the Central Identification Laboratory at Schofield Barracks in Hawaii.

Only 35 of the 429 sailors and Marines who died on Oklahoma were identified in the years following the attack. The remains of 388 unidentified sailors and Marines were first interred as unknowns in the Nu'uanu and Halawa cemeteries, but were all disinterred in 1947, in an unsuccessful attempt to identify more personnel. In 1950, all unidentified remains from Oklahoma were buried as Unknowns in 61 caskets in 46 graves at the National Memorial Cemetery of the Pacific, known as the Punchbowl, in Honolulu. In 2003, a Pearl Harbor survivor, Ray Emory, conducted inquiries which resulted in the exhumation of a single casket associated with the Oklahoma loss. DNA evidence and anthropological research revealed that remains are "extremely commingled" — at least 95 individuals were within the first disinterred casket based on mitochondrial DNA results. (Note: "The USS Oklahoma remains have a long and macabre history. Some bodies were recovered from the ship and the waters around it in the weeks after the attack. Others remained entombed in the hull until the battleship was salvaged in 1942 and 1943. The bones of the dead, encrusted in mud and oil, were removed from the ship and buried in two Hawaiian cemeteries. In 1947, the Graves Registration Service undertook a two-year effort to identify the remains." Using dental records they matched names to 27 skulls. However, authorities "decided to rebury all of the remains because no complete bodies could be identified." In 2015, Defense POW/MIA Accounting Agency dug up nearly 400 sets of remains from a Hawaii cemetery. Cutting edge forensic science and genealogical help from families were employed to identify the fallen. It is expected that 80 per cent of the battleship's missing crew members will be identified by 2020.)

On December 7, 2007, the 66th anniversary of the attack on Pearl Harbor, a memorial for the 429 crew members who were killed in the attack was dedicated on Ford Island, just outside the entrance to where the battleship Missouri is docked as a museum. Missouri is moored where Oklahoma was moored when she was sunk. The USS Oklahoma memorial is part of Pearl Harbor National Memorial and is an arrangement of engraved black granite walls and white marble posts. According to the National Park Service, "in 2015, as part of the USS Oklahoma Project, the Defense POW/MIA Accounting Agency, through a partnership with the Department of Veterans Affairs, exhumed all of the unknown remains from the USS Oklahoma. Through December 2017, DPAA made their 100th identification from the ship's casualties. The Oklahoma Project is centered at Nebraska's Offutt Air Force Base. Despite the passage of seven decades, "fully two-thirds of the 2,400 American casualties are what the Defense POW-MIA Accounting Agency describes as "unresolved." The bodies of most of those killed were never recovered, or they were recovered but not identified. Unidentified remains were buried in Hawaiian cemeteries in graves marked "unknown."

In April 2015, the Department of Defense announced, as part of a policy change that established threshold criteria for disinterment of unknowns, that the unidentified remains of the crew members of Oklahoma would be exhumed for DNA analysis, with the goal of returning identified remains to their families. The process began in June 2015, when four graves, two individual and two group graves, were disinterred. In December 2017, 100 had been identified; at the end of fiscal year 2018, 181 Oklahoma unknowns had been identified by the Defense POW/MIA Accounting Agency. On February 26, 2019, the 200th unknown was identified. On December 6, 2019, the US Department of Defense announced that 236 remains had been identified from Oklahoma and that 152 had yet to be identified. As of Fiscal year 2020, 267 missing crew have been accounted for.

In 2016, the United States Defense POW/MIA Accounting Agency resolved to identify the Oklahoma crew using DNA testing. England's remains were found within the grave of unknown soldiers at the National Cemetery of the Pacific. The Department of Defense used mitochondrial DNA to make the identification. Upon identification, he was reburied with full military honors next to his parents, Sam and Thelma England, in the Evergreen Cemetery in Colorado Springs. His niece attended the funeral, which included a large procession. There was an "impressive motorcade and the services" were covered by the Discovery Channel and National Geographic Channel, who were creating film footage in 2016 for the 75th anniversary coverage of the Pearl Harbor attack.

== Namesakes and honors ==
Two ships have been named USS England for him.

In 1943, destroyer escort USS England was named in his honor. At the Bethlehem Shipbuilding Corporation shipyard in San Francisco, California, his mother Thelma (Mrs. H. B. England) cracked the ceremonial bottle of champagne for the ship christening on England's bow in San Francisco Harbor on September 26, 1943. She was commissioned on December 10, 1943, with Commander W. B. Pendleton in command. Lennie England served as maid of honor and kept the ribbon-wrapped bottle until her death in 1995. The ship sank six enemy submarines in the span of 12 days in May 1944, a feat unparalleled in the history of antisubmarine warfare. That performance caused the Chief of Naval Operations, Admiral Ernest King, to declare in a rhetorical flourish that "There’ll always be an England in the United States Navy." DE-635 was decommissioned in 1945.

As 'down payment' on this promise, the second ship to bear the name, the Guided Missile Cruiser USS England (DLG-22) was launched in 1962. That England served in every major Pacific engagement from Vietnam to Desert Storm, from rescuing pilots, performing as plane guard and picket, to showing force around the globe. England was awarded the Navy Unit Commendation Ribbon for supporting search and rescue operations in the Gulf of Tonkin from January 3 to June 6, 1966. Originally called a 'destroyer leader' or 'frigate' (DLG), in 1975 she was re-designated a cruiser (CG) in the United States Navy 1975 ship reclassification. England was awarded the Navy Unit Commendation a final time for actions performed August 2 to 16, 1990. She was scrapped in 2004.

Since then, beginning on the 75th anniversary of the attack on Pearl Harbor, a grass roots petition has been circulated to commission a third USS England, "to recognize and honor the service and sacrifice of Ensign John Charles England," and to demand fulfillment of Admiral King's promise.

Alhambra High School continues to award the John C. England award each year to the graduating senior who has "excelled in character, integrity and benevolent service."

BEQ 836 at Naval Service Training Command, Great Lakes is also named in honor of England.

== Military awards ==

Purple Heart

American Defense Service Medal	Asiatic–Pacific Campaign Medal	World War II Victory Medal
