= Alumni Hall (Navy) =

Building in Maryland, United States

- Brigade Activities Center, Bob Hope Center for the Performing Arts
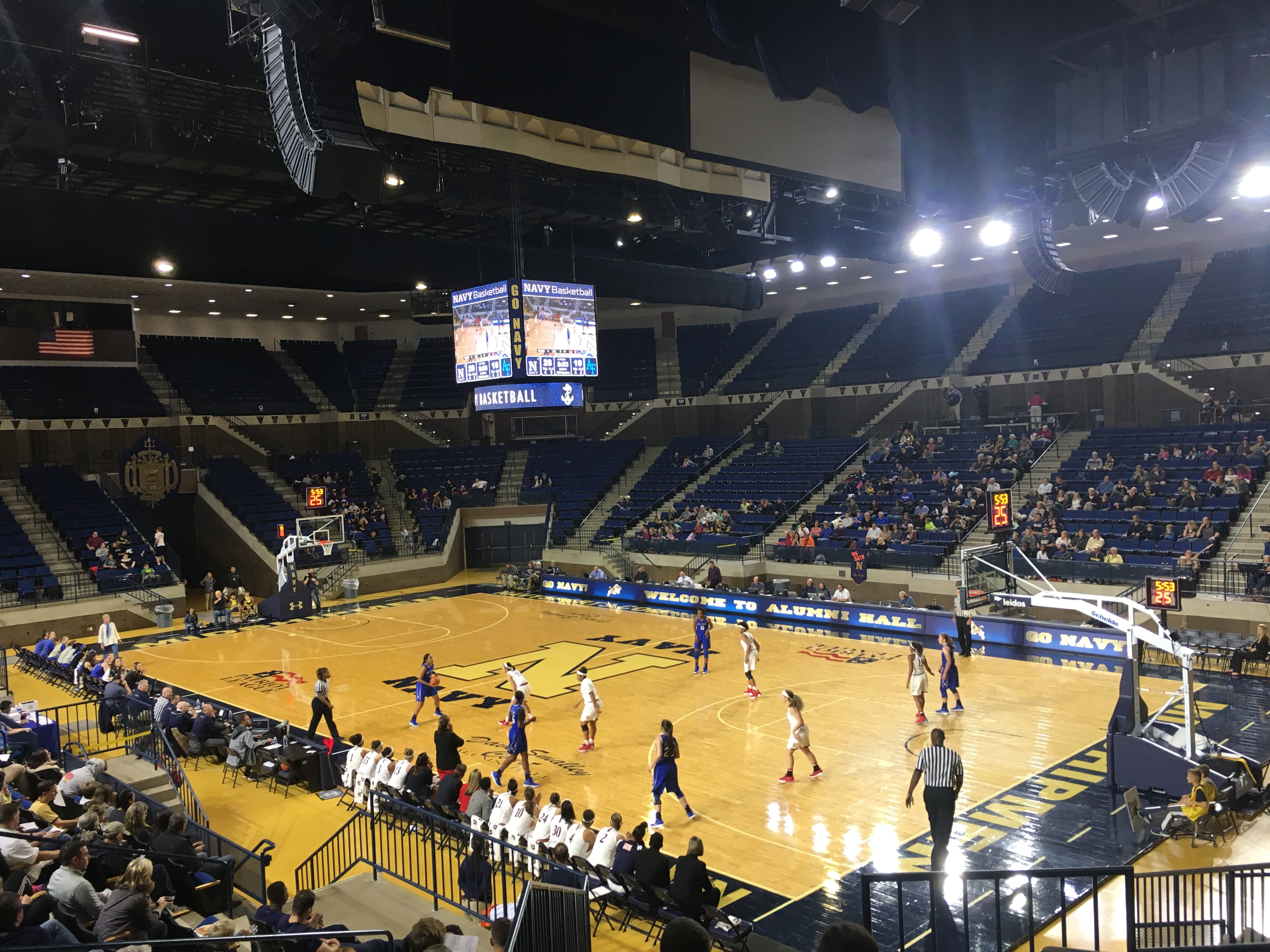
- The Alumni Hall court during a 2017 women's basketball game between Air Force and Navy
- Interactive map of Alumni Hall
- Location: 461 College Parkway; Annapolis, Maryland 21402 USA
- Coordinates: 38.984491°N 76.487782°W
- Owner: U.S. Naval Academy
- Operator: U.S. Naval Academy
- Capacity: 5,710 (basketball); 6,500 (multi purpose)
- Surface: Hardwood

Construction
- Groundbreaking: December, 1987
- Opened: October 5, 1991
- Cost: $30.8 million ($72.8 million in 2025 dollars)
- Architect: Daniel, Mann, Johnson & Mendenhall
- General contractor: Donohoe Construction Company

Tenants
- Navy Midshipmen (men's and women's basketball)

Alumni Hall is an indoor stadium at the United States Naval Academy, in Annapolis in the U.S. state of Maryland. Completed in 1991, it seats 5,710 and serves as the primary assembly hall for the Brigade of Midshipmen. It is used for athletic contests — including basketball and wrestling — and is home for the Naval Academy women's and men's basketball teams, members of the Patriot League. Additionally, it is adaptable for lectures, assemblies, theatrical productions, concerts and official ceremonies and is home for the Bob Hope Center for the Performing Arts. It has dining facilities where dinners and receptions are held. It also serves as an alternate location for Naval Academy graduation ceremonies when Navy-Marine Corps Memorial Stadium cannot be used due to bad weather.

== Building features ==
The hall has two exterior, landscaped memorial plazas donated by the classes of 1942, '58 and '59.

Mounted on the interior wall facing the building's mail entrance are three large mural-sized paintings donated by the class of 1961. The work of the prominent marine artist Tom Freeman, who created and executed the paintings under a commission from the class, they depict the major fighting arms of the US Navy during the 1960s when the greatest number of members of 1961 were on active duty. From left to right, they are titled "The Marines at the Hue Citadel", "Dawn on Yankee Station", and "Rescue by USS Barb". Note that consideration is being given to having a separate entry on the paintings accompanied by pictures of each; a link will be provided should the article be written.

All seats in the facility are dedicated to the memory of individuals who have committed themselves to the cause of freedom.

The approximately 40 rooms in the building have plaques dedicated to individuals and organizations who have supported our country and the Naval Academy.

A wall is reserved by the Pearl Harbor Survivors Association to commemorate those who were killed during the attack on Pearl Harbor.

One concourse is dedicated to Lt. Lloyd Garnett and his shipmates on the USS Samuel B. Roberts (DE-413) who earned their ship the reputation as the "destroyer escort that fought like a battleship" in the Battle of Leyte Gulf during World War II.

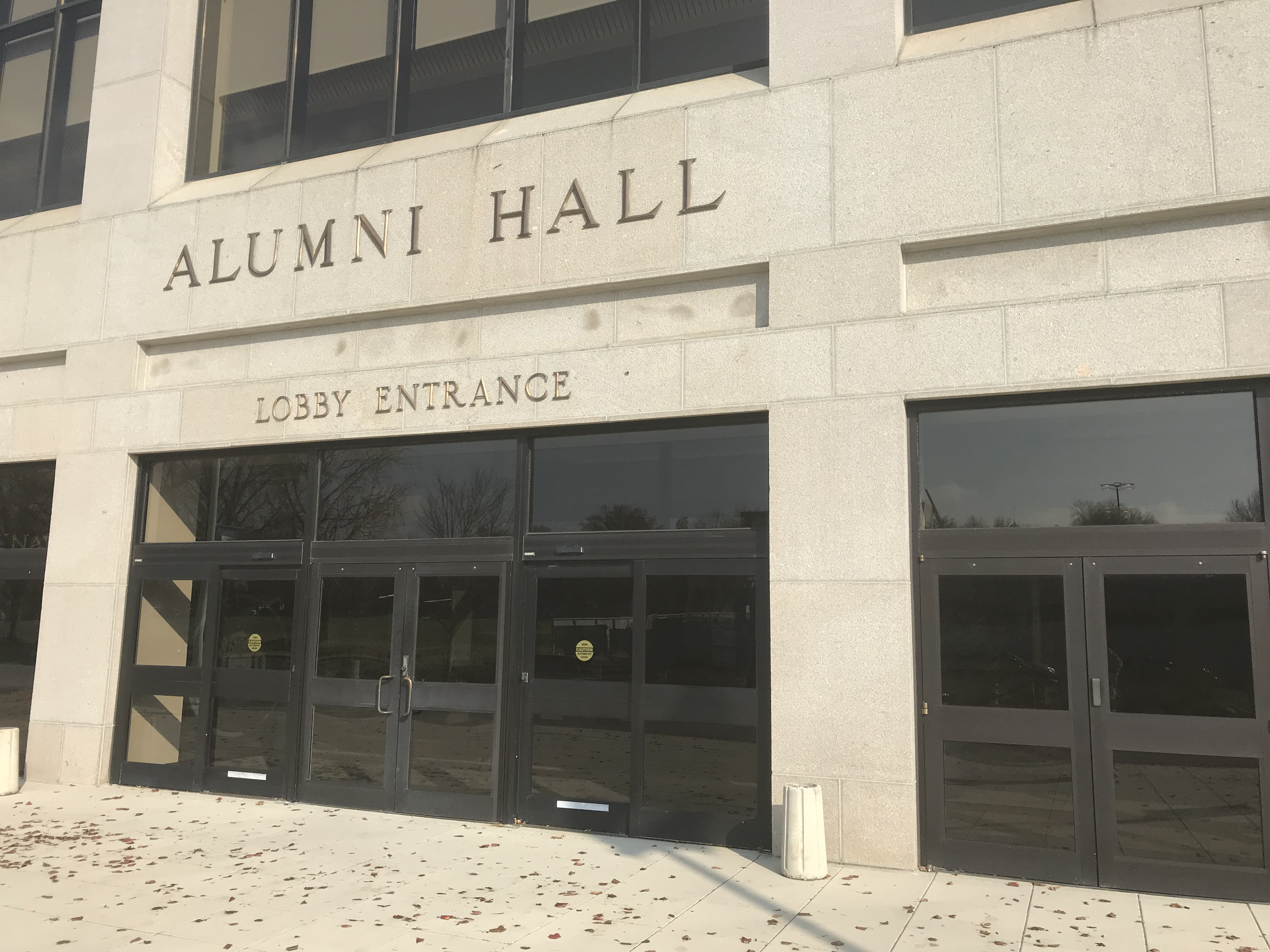
The entrance to Alumni Hall in 2017

A music room is named for Lt. Mark Lange, Class of 1979, whose A-6E Intruder (flying from USS John F. Kennedy) was shot down over Lebanon in December 1983. Residents from Lange's hometown of Detroit and the surrounding areas funded the room.

== See also ==
- Navy Midshipmen#Facilities
- List of indoor arenas in the United States#Major college indoor arenas
- List of NCAA Division I basketball arenas
