= USS Oklahoma (BB-37) =

Dreadnought battleship of the United States Navy

Coordinates: 24°58′N 150°6′W

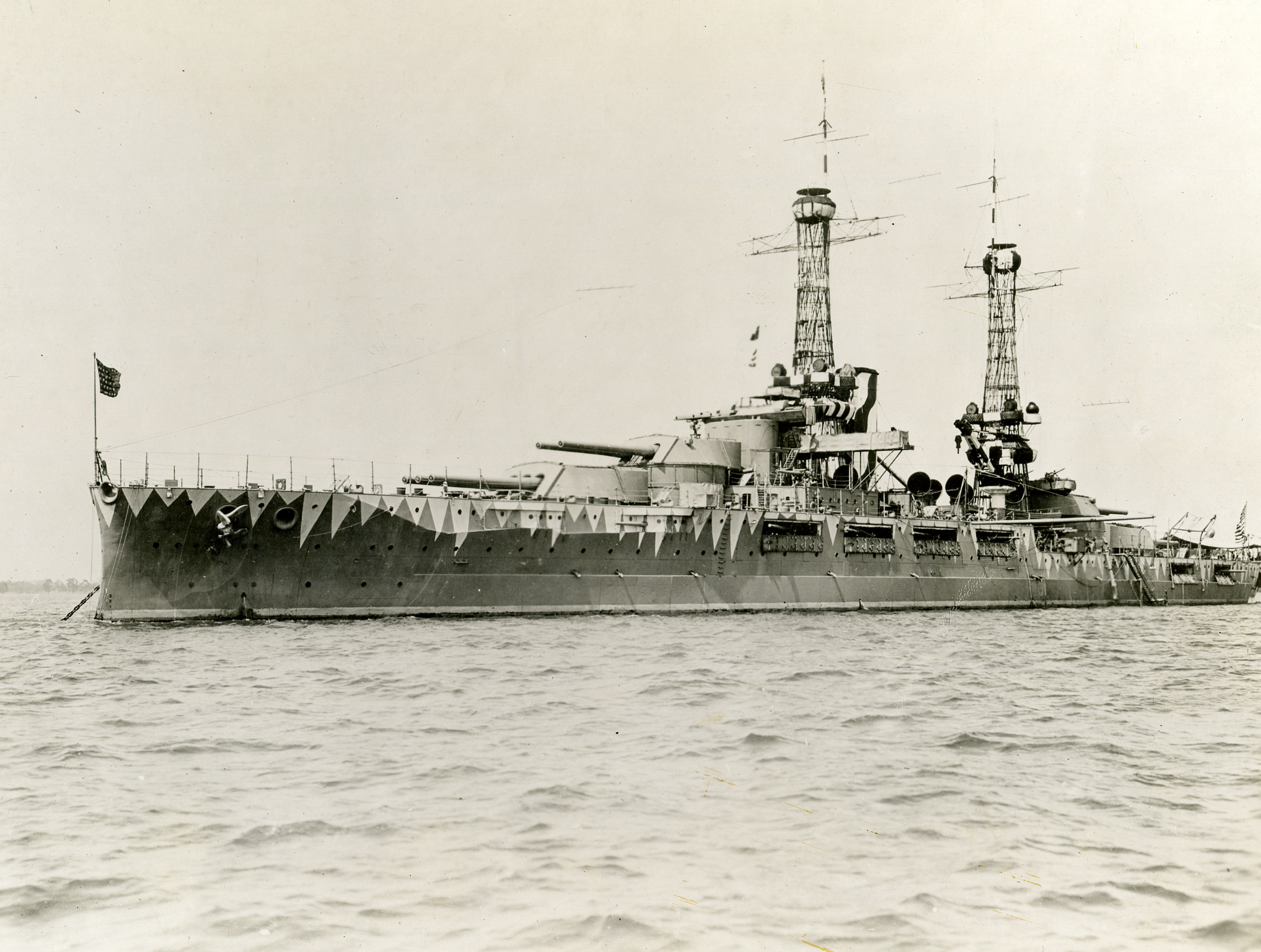
- USS Oklahoma (BB-37) at anchor

History

United States
- Name: Oklahoma
- Namesake: Oklahoma
- Ordered: 4 March 1911
- Builder: New York Shipbuilding Corporation, Camden, New Jersey
- Laid down: 26 October 1912
- Launched: 23 March 1914
- Commissioned: 2 May 1916
- Decommissioned: 1 September 1944
- Fate: Sunk in attack on Pearl Harbor, 7 December 1941; refloated for scrapping; sank under tow 1947

General characteristics
- Class & type: Nevada-class battleship
- Displacement: 27,500 long tons (27,900 t)
- Length: 583 ft (178 m) LOA; 575 feet (175 m) LWL
- Beam: 95 ft 6 in (29.1 m)
- Draft: 28 ft 6 in (8.7 m)
- Installed power: 12 × Babcock & Wilcox boilers; 24,800 ihp (18,500 kW)
- Propulsion: 2 × shafts; 2 × triple-expansion steam engines
- Speed: 20.5 knots (38.0 km/h; 23.6 mph)
- Range: 8,000 nmi (15,000 km; 9,200 mi) at 10 knots (19 km/h; 12 mph).
- Complement: As built: 864 officers and crewmen; From 1929: 1,398
- Armament: As built: 2 × triple, 2 × twin 14 in (356 mm)/45 cal. guns; 21 × single 5 in (127 mm)/51 cal. guns; 2 × single 3 in (76 mm)/50 cal. AA guns; 2 or 4 × 21 in (533 mm) torpedo tubes; After 1927–1929 refit: 12 × single 5 in/51 cal. guns; 8 × single 5 in/25 cal. AA guns
- Armor: Belt: 13.5 to 8 in (343 to 203 mm); Bulkheads: 13 in (330 mm) to 8 in; Barbettes: 13 in; Turrets: 18 in (457 mm); Decks: 4.5 in; Conning tower: 16 in (406 mm), 8 in (203 mm) top
- Aircraft carried: as built: 3 × floatplanes; 2 × catapults; 1941: 2 × floatplanes; 1 × catapult

USS Oklahoma (BB-37) was a Nevada-class battleship built by the New York Shipbuilding Corporation for the United States Navy, notable for being the first American class of oil-burning dreadnoughts. Commissioned in 1916, the ship served in World War I as a part of Battleship Division Six, protecting Allied convoys on their way across the Atlantic. After the war, she served in both the United States Battle Fleet and Scouting Fleet. Oklahoma was modernized between 1927 and 1929. In 1936, she rescued American citizens and refugees from the Spanish Civil War. On returning to the West Coast in August of the same year, Oklahoma spent the rest of her service in the Pacific.

On 7 December 1941, during the Japanese attack on Pearl Harbor, several torpedoes from torpedo bombers hit the Oklahoma's hull and the ship capsized. A total of 429 crew died; survivors jumped off the ship 50 feet (15 m) into burning oil on water or crawled across mooring lines that connected Oklahoma and Maryland. Some sailors inside escaped when rescuers drilled holes and opened hatches to rescue them. The ship was salvaged in 1943. Unlike most of the other battleships that were recovered following Pearl Harbor, Oklahoma was too damaged to return to duty. Her wreck was eventually stripped of her remaining armament and superstructure before being sold for scrap in 1946. The hulk sank in a storm while being towed from Oahu, Hawaii, to a breakers yard in San Francisco Bay in 1947.

== Design ==
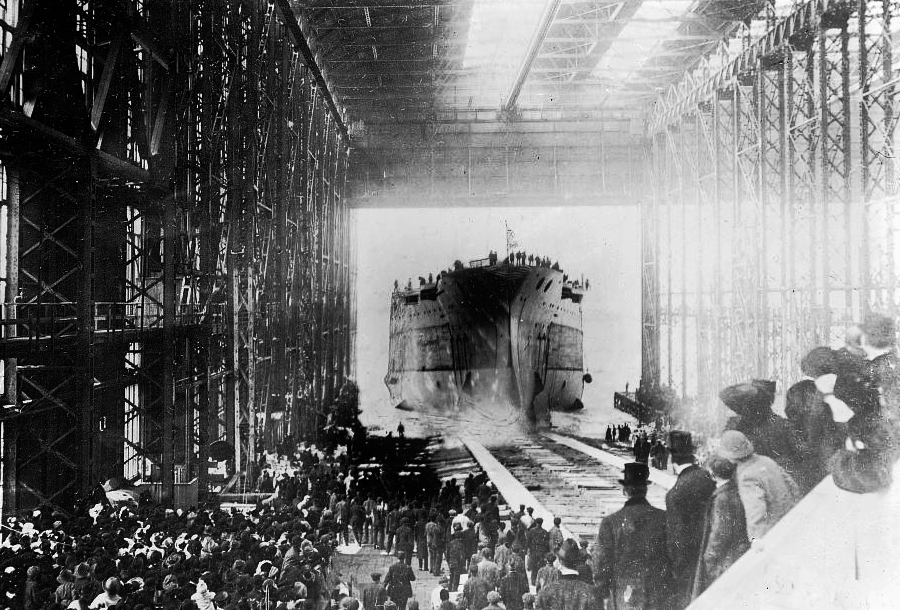
Launch of Oklahoma on 23 March 1914

Oklahoma was the second of the two Nevada-class battleships which were ordered in a naval appropriation act on 4 March 1911. She was the latest in a series of 22 battleships and seven armored cruisers ordered by the United States Navy between 1900 and 1911. The Nevada-class ships were the first of the US Navy's Standard-type battleships, of which 12 were completed by 1923. With these ships, the Navy created a fleet of modern battleships similar in long-range gunnery, speed, turning radius, and protection. Significant improvements, however, were made in the Standard-type ships as naval technology progressed. The main innovations were triple turrets and all-or-nothing protection. The triple turrets reduced the length of the ship that needed protection by placing 10 guns in four turrets instead of five, thus allowing thicker armor. The Nevada-class ships were also the first US battleships with oil-fired instead of coal-fired boilers, oil having more recoverable energy per ton than coal, thus increasing the ships' range. Oklahoma differed from her sister Nevada in being fitted with triple-expansion steam engines, a much older technology than Nevada's new geared steam turbines.

As constructed, she had a standard displacement of 27,500 long tons (27,941 t) and a full-load displacement of 28,400 long tons (28,856 t). She was 583 feet (178 m) in length overall, 575 feet (175 m) at the waterline, and had a beam of 95 feet 6 inches (29.11 m) and a draft of 28 feet 6 inches (8.69 m).

The ship was powered by 12 oil-fired Babcock & Wilcox boilers driving two dual-acting, vertical triple-expansion steam engines, which provided 24,800 ihp (18,500 kW) for a maximum speed of 20.5 knots (38.0 km/h; 23.6 mph). She had a designed range of 8,000 nautical miles (15,000 km; 9,200 mi) at 10 knots (19 km/h; 12 mph).

As built, the armor on Oklahoma consisted of belt armor from 13.5 to 8.0 inches (343 to 203 mm) thick. Deck armor was 3 inches (76 mm) thick with a second 1.5 inches (38 mm) deck, and turret armor was 18 inches (457 mm) or 16 in (406 mm) on the face, 5 inches (127 mm) on the top, 10 inches (254 mm) on the sides, and 9 inches (229 mm) on the rear. Armor on her barbettes was 13.5 inches. Her conning tower was protected by 16 inches of armor, with 8 inches of armor on its roof.

Her armament consisted of ten 14-inch (356 mm)/45 caliber guns, arranged in two triple and two twin mounts. As built, she also carried 21 5-inch (127 mm)/51 caliber guns, primarily for defense against destroyers and torpedo boats. She also had two (some references say four) 21-inch (533 mm) torpedo tubes for the Bliss-Leavitt Mark 3 torpedo. Her crew consisted of 864 officers and enlisted men.

== Service history ==
=== Construction ===
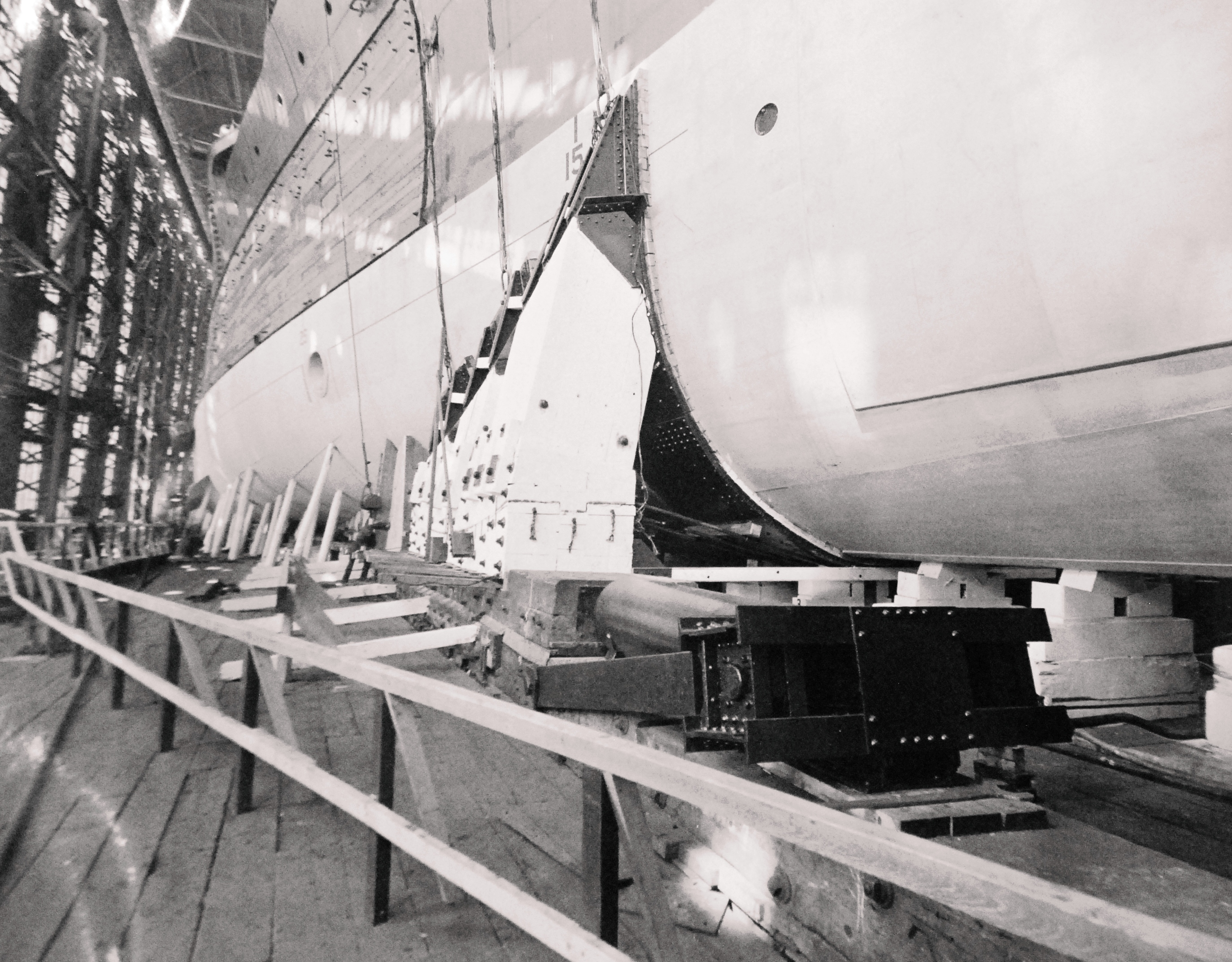
Close up of the hull on launch day

Oklahoma's keel was laid down on 26 October 1912, by the New York Shipbuilding Corporation of Camden, New Jersey, which bid $5,926,000 to construct the ship. By 12 December 1912, she was 11.2% complete, and by 13 July 1913, she was at 33%.

She was launched on 23 March 1914, sponsored by Lorena J. Cruce, daughter of Oklahoma Governor Lee Cruce. The launch was preceded by an invocation, the first for an American warship in half a century, given by Elijah Embree Hoss, and was attended by various dignitaries from Oklahoma and the federal government. She was subsequently moved to a dock near the new Argentine battleship Moreno and Chinese cruiser Fei Hung, soon to be the Greek Elli, for fitting-out.

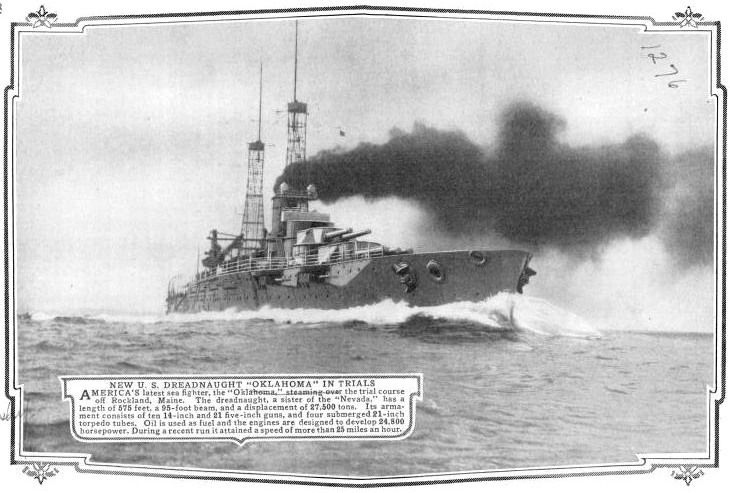
Oklahoma underway during her sea trials

On the night of 19 July 1915, large fires were discovered underneath the fore main battery turret, the third to flare up on an American battleship in less than a month. (Note: The other two fires were found on Alabama and New Jersey; all were started under the fore main battery turret.) However, by 22 July, the Navy believed that the Oklahoma fire had been caused by "defective insulation" or a mistake made by a dockyard worker. The fire delayed the battleship's completion so much that Nevada was able to conduct her sea trials and be commissioned before Oklahoma. On 23 October 1915, she was 98.1 percent complete. She was commissioned at Philadelphia, on 2 May 1916, with Captain Roger Welles in command.

=== World War I ===
Following commissioning, the ship remained along the East Coast of the United States, primarily visiting various Navy yards. At first, she was unable to join the Battleship Division Nine task force sent to support the Grand Fleet in the North Sea during World War I because oil was unavailable there. In 1917, she underwent a refit, with two 3 in (76 mm)/50 caliber guns being installed forward of the mainmast for antiaircraft defense and nine of the 5-inch/51 caliber guns being removed or repositioned. While conditions on the ship were cramped, the sailors on the ship had many advantages for education available to them. They also engaged in athletic competitions, including boxing, wrestling, and rowing competitions with the crews of the battleship Texas and the tug Ontario. The camaraderie built by these small competitions led to fleet-wide establishment of many athletic teams pitting crews against one another for morale by the 1930s.

On 13 August 1918, Oklahoma was assigned to Battleship Division Six under the command of Rear Admiral Thomas S. Rodgers, and departed for Europe alongside Nevada. On 23 August, they met with destroyers Balch, Conyngham, Downes, Kimberly, Allen, and Sampson, 275 miles (443 km) west of Ireland, before steaming for Berehaven, where they waited for 18 days before battleship Utah arrived. The division remained at anchor, tasked to protect American convoys coming into the area, but was only called out of the harbor once in 80 days. On 14 October 1918, while under command of Charles B. McVay Jr., she escorted troop ships into port at the United Kingdom, returning on 16 October. For the rest of the time, the ship conducted drills at anchor or in nearby Bantry Bay. To pass the time, the crews played American football and sailed competitively. Oklahoma suffered six casualties between 21 October and 2 November to the 1918 flu pandemic. Oklahoma remained off Berehaven until the end of the war on 11 November 1918. Shortly thereafter, several Oklahoma crewmembers were involved in a series of fights with members of Sinn Féin, forcing the ship's commander to apologize and financially compensate two town mayors.

=== Interwar period ===
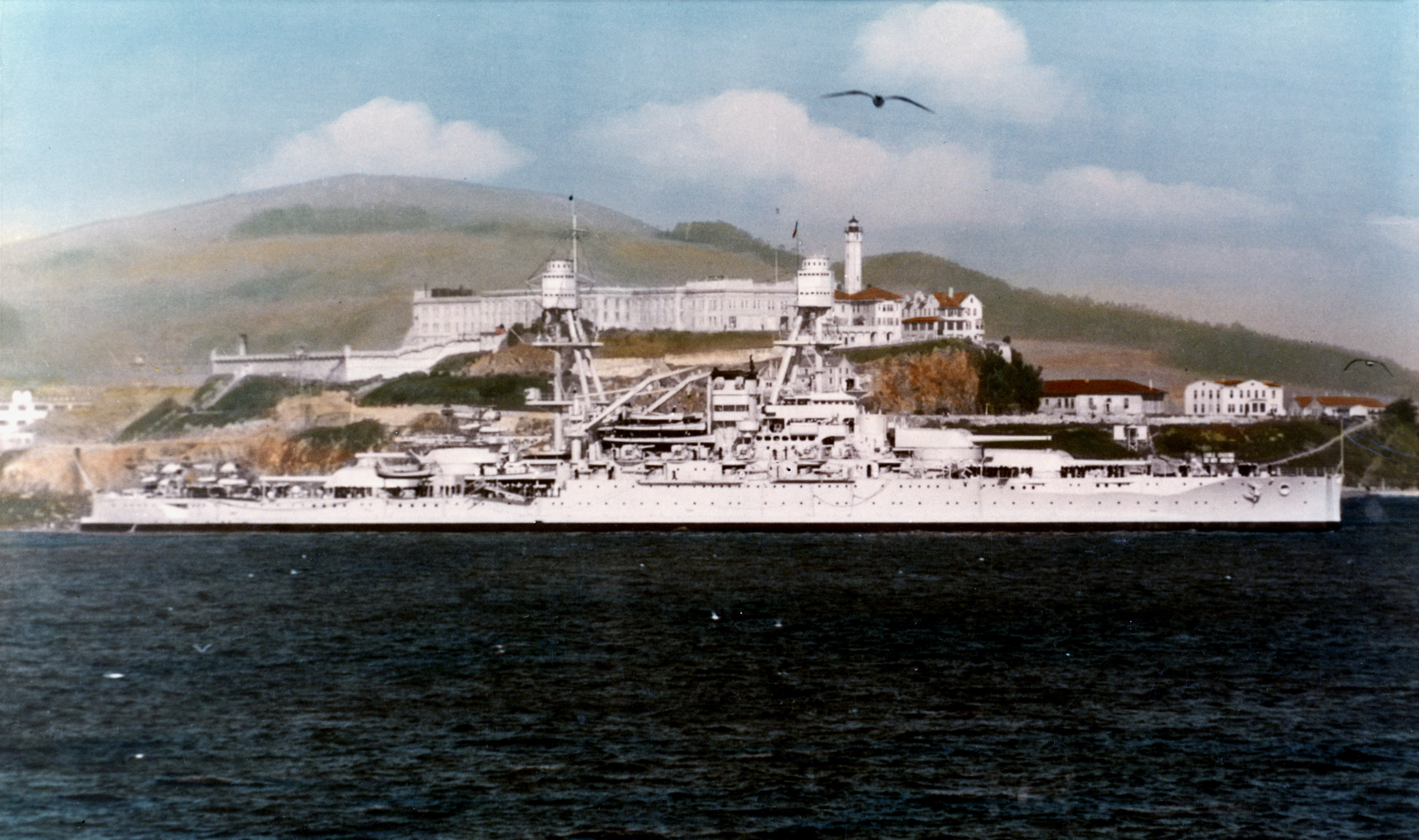
Oklahoma after her modernization, passing Alcatraz

Oklahoma left for Portland on 26 November, joined there by Arizona on 30 November, Nevada on 4 December, and Battleship Division Nine's ships shortly after. The ships were assigned as a convoy escort for the ocean liner SS George Washington, carrying President Woodrow Wilson, and arrived with that ship in France several days later. She departed 14 December, for New York City, and then spent early 1919 conducting winter battle drills off the coast of Cuba. On 15 June 1919, she returned to Brest, escorting Wilson on a second trip, and returned to New York, on 8 July. A part of the Atlantic Fleet for the next two years, Oklahoma was overhauled and her crew trained. The secondary battery was reduced from 20 to 12 5-inch/51 caliber guns in 1918. Early in 1921, she voyaged to South America's West Coast for combined exercises with the Pacific Fleet, and returned later that year for the Peruvian Centennial.

She then joined the Pacific Fleet and, in 1925, began a high-profile training cruise with several other battleships. They left San Francisco on 15 April 1925, arrived in Hawaii, on 27 April, where they conducted war games. They left for Samoa, on 1 July, crossing the equator on 6 July. On 27 July, they arrived in Australia and conducted a number of exercises there, before spending time in New Zealand, returning to the United States later that year. In early 1927, she transited the Panama Canal and moved to join the Scouting Fleet.

In November 1927, she entered the Philadelphia Navy Yard for an extensive overhaul. She was modernized by adding eight 5-inch/25 cal guns, and her turrets' maximum elevation was raised from 15 to 30 degrees. An aircraft catapult was installed atop turret No.3. She was also substantially up-armored between September 1927 and July 1929, with anti-torpedo bulges added, as well as an additional 2 inches (51 mm) of steel on her armor deck. The overhaul increased her beam to 108 feet (33 m), the widest in the US Navy, and reduced her speed to 19.68 knots (36.45 km/h; 22.65 mph).

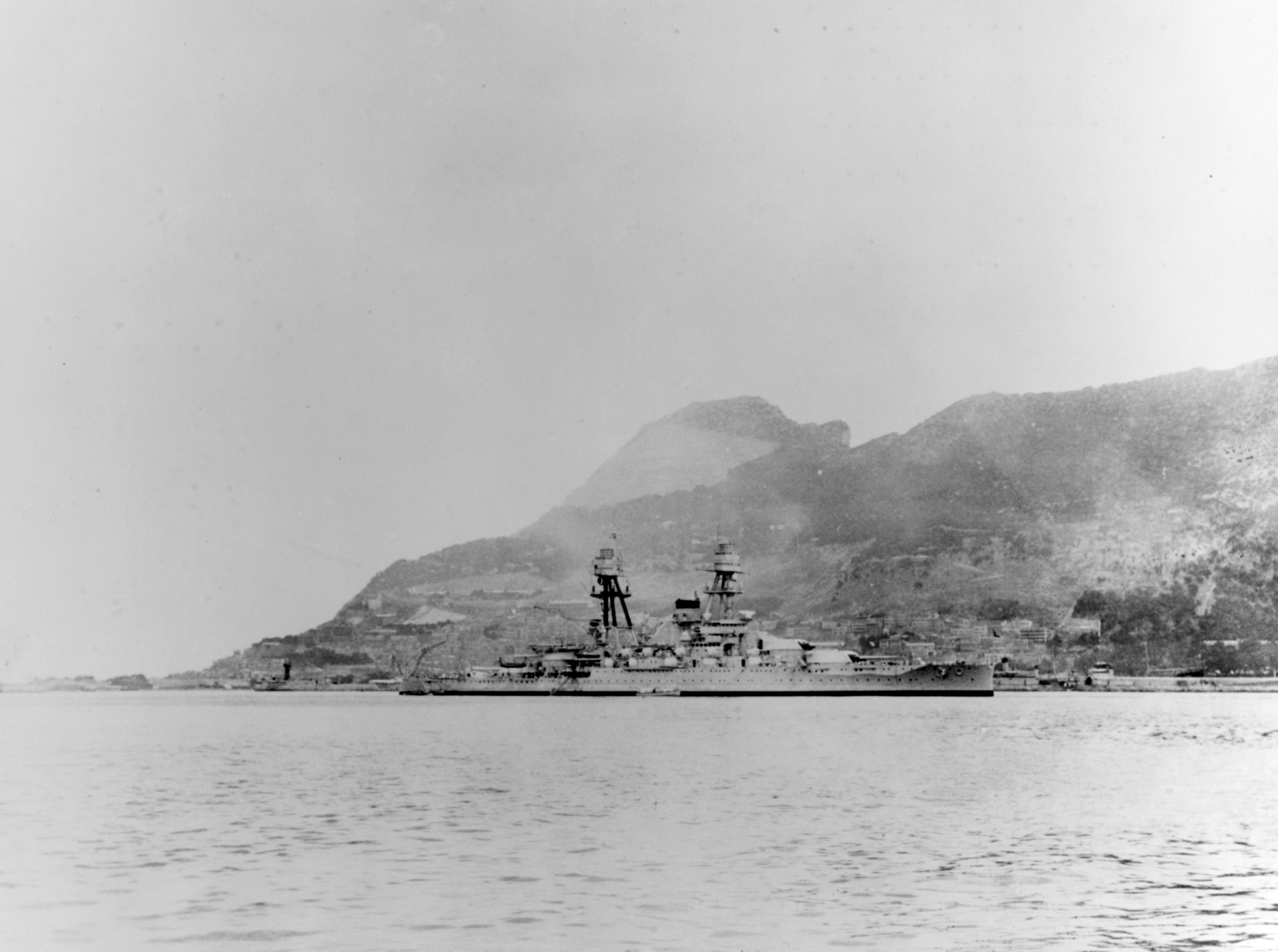
Oklahoma in Gibraltar during the Spanish Civil War, April 1936

Oklahoma rejoined the Scouting Fleet for exercises in the Caribbean, then returned to the West Coast in June 1930, for fleet operations through spring 1936. That summer, she carried midshipmen on a European training cruise, visiting northern ports. The cruise was interrupted by the outbreak of civil war in Spain. Oklahoma sailed to Bilbao, arriving on 24 July 1936, to rescue American citizens and other refugees whom she carried to Gibraltar and French ports. She returned to Norfolk on 11 September, and to the West Coast on 24 October.

The Pacific Fleet operations of Oklahoma during the next four years included joint operations with the Army and the training of reservists. Oklahoma was based at Pearl Harbor from 29 December 1937, for patrols and exercises, and only twice returned to the mainland, once to have anti-aircraft guns and armor added to her superstructure at Puget Sound Navy Yard in early February 1941, and once to have armor replaced at San Pedro in mid-August of the same year. En route on 22 August, a severe storm hit Oklahoma. One man was swept overboard and three others were injured. The next morning, a broken starboard propeller shaft forced the ship to halt, assess the damage, and sail to San Francisco, the closest navy yard with an adequate drydock. She remained in drydock, undergoing repairs until mid-October. The ship then returned to Hawaii. The Washington Naval Treaty had precluded the Navy from replacing Oklahoma, leading to the series of refits to extend her lifespan. The ship was planned to be retired on 2 May 1942.

=== Attack on Pearl Harbor ===
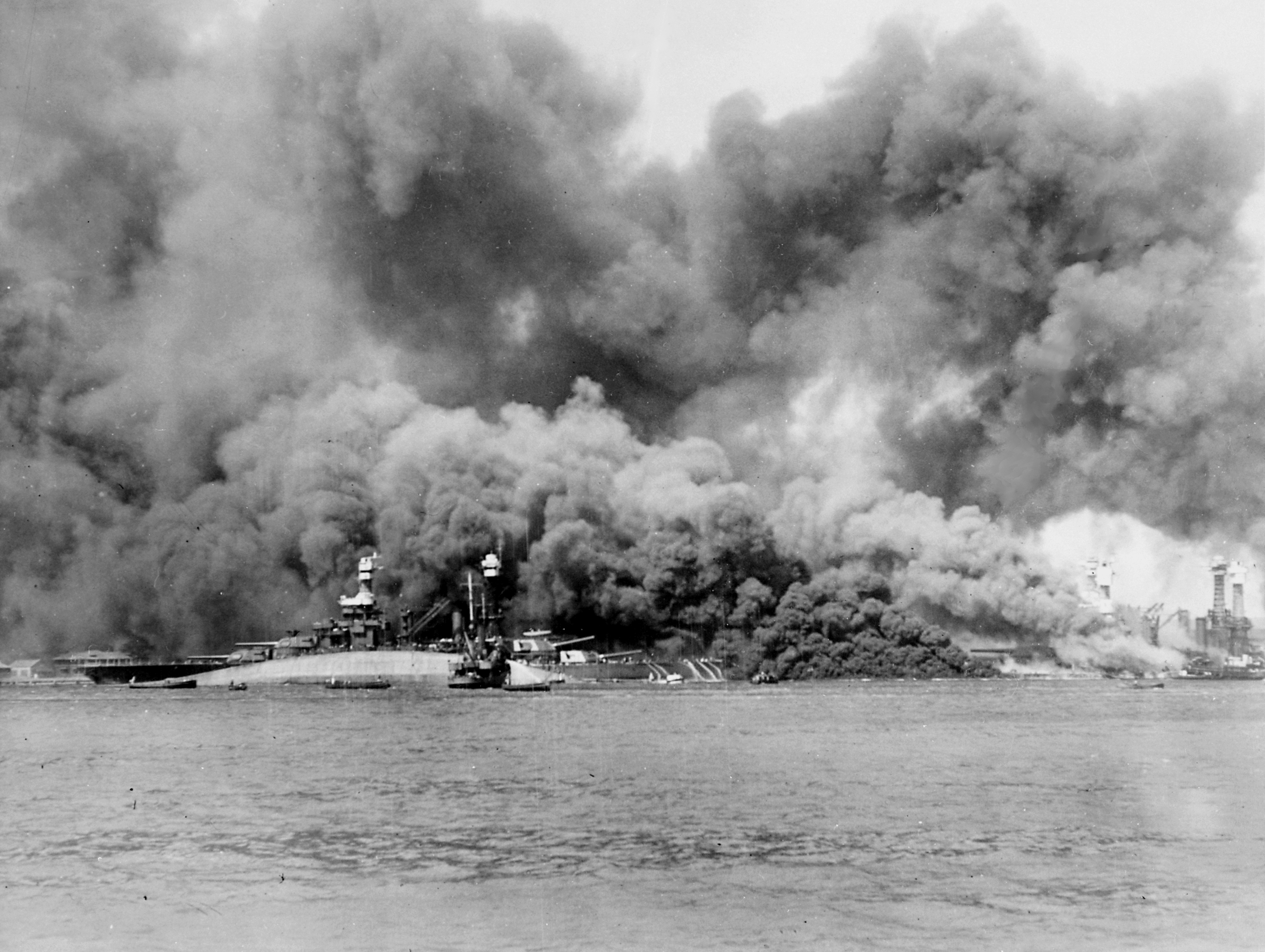
Oklahoma capsized during the attack on Pearl Harbor

On 7 December 1941, when the Japanese attacked Pearl Harbor, Oklahoma was moored in berth Fox 5, on Battleship Row, in the outboard position alongside the battleship Maryland. She was immediately targeted by planes from the Japanese aircraft carriers Akagi and Kaga, and was struck by three torpedoes. The first and second hit seconds apart, striking amidships at approximately 07:50 or 07:53, 20 feet (6.1 m) below the waterline between the smokestack and mainmast. The torpedoes blew away a large section of her anti-torpedo bulge and spilled oil from the adjacent fuel bunkers' sounding tubes, but neither penetrated the hull. About 80 men scrambled to man the AA guns on deck, but were unable to use them because the firing locks were in the armory. Most of the men manned battle stations below the ship's waterline or sought shelter in the third deck, protocol during an aerial attack. The third torpedo struck at 08:00, near Frame 65, hitting close to where the first two did, penetrating the hull, destroying the adjacent fuel bunkers on the second platform deck and rupturing access trunks to the two forward boiler rooms as well as the transverse bulkhead to the aft boiler room and the longitudinal bulkhead of the two forward firing rooms.

As she began to capsize to port, two more torpedoes struck, and her men were strafed as they abandoned ship. In less than twelve minutes, she rolled over until halted by her masts touching bottom, her starboard side above water, and a part of her keel exposed. It's believed the ship absorbed as many as eight hits in all. Many of her crew, however, remained in the fight, clambering aboard Maryland to help serve her anti-aircraft batteries. Four hundred twenty-nine of her officers and enlisted men were killed or missing. One of those killed, Father Aloysius Schmitt, was the first American chaplain of any faith to die in World War II. Thirty-two others were wounded, and many were trapped within the capsized hull. Efforts to rescue them began within minutes of the ship's capsizing and continued into the night, in several cases rescuing men trapped inside the ship for hours. Julio DeCastro, a Hawaiian civilian yard worker, organized a team that saved 32 Oklahoma sailors. This was a particularly tricky operation as cutting open the hull released trapped air, raising the water levels around entombed men, while cutting in the wrong places could ignite stored fuel. It is likely that some survivors were never reached in time.

Some of those who died later had ships named after them, including Ensign John C. England for whom USS England (DE-635) and USS England (DLG-22) are named. USS Stern (DE-187) was named for Ensign Charles M. Stern, Jr. USS Austin was named for Chief Carpenter John Arnold Austin, who was also posthumously awarded the Navy Cross for his actions during the attack. USS Schmitt (DE-676) was named for Father Aloysius Schmitt. USS Barber (DE-161) was named for Malcolm, Randolph, and Leroy Barber. In addition to Austin's Navy Cross, the Medal of Honor was awarded to Ensign Francis C. Flaherty and Seaman James R. Ward, while three Navy and Marine Corps Medals were awarded to others on Oklahoma during the attack.

==== Salvage ====
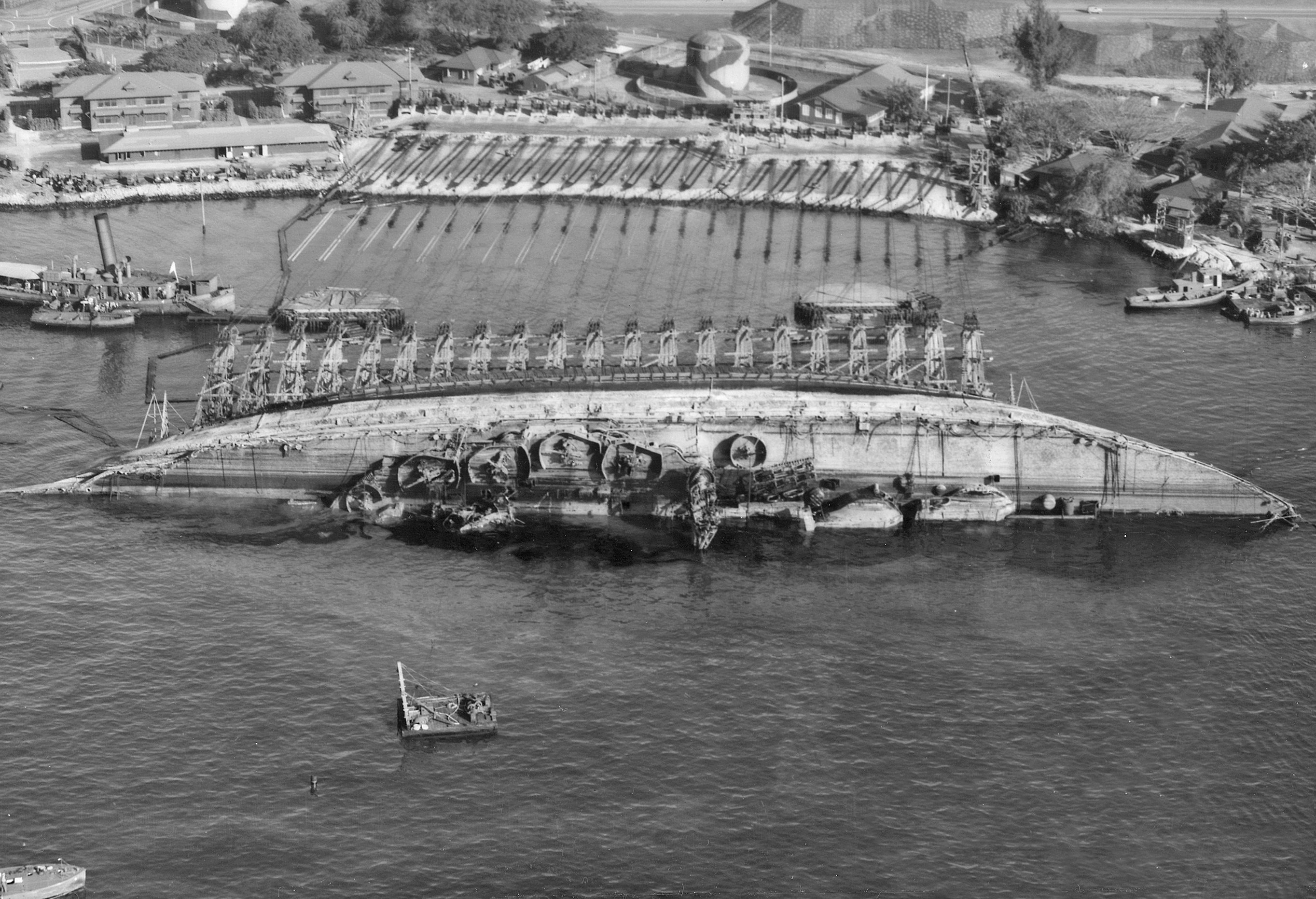
An aerial view of salvage operations on 19 March 1943, looking toward Ford Island, with the ship halfway righted.

By early 1942, it was determined that Oklahoma could be salvaged and that she was a navigational hazard, having rolled into the harbor's navigational channel. Even though it was cost-prohibitive to do so, the job of salvaging Oklahoma commenced on 15 July 1942, under the immediate command of Captain F. H. Whitaker, and a team from the Pearl Harbor Naval Shipyard.

Preparations for righting the overturned hull took under eight months to complete. Air was pumped into interior chambers and improvised airlocks built into the ship, forcing 20,000 tonnes (19,684 long tons; 22,046 short tons) of water out of the ship through the torpedo holes. Four thousand five hundred tonnes (4,429 long tons; 4,960 short tons) of coral soil were deposited in front of her bow to prevent sliding and two barges were posted on either end of the ship to control the ship's rising.

Twenty-one derricks were attached to the upturned hull; each carried high-tensile steel cables that were connected to hydraulic winching machines ashore. The righting (parbuckling) operation began on 8 March, and was completed by 16 June 1943. Teams of naval specialists then entered the previously submerged ship to remove human remains. Cofferdams were then placed around the hull to allow basic repairs to be undertaken so that the ship could be refloated; this work was completed by November. On 28 December, Oklahoma was towed into drydock No. 2, at the Pearl Harbor Naval Shipyard. Once in the dock, her main guns, machinery, remaining ammunition, and stores were removed. The severest structural damage on the hull was also repaired to make the ship watertight. The US Navy deemed her too old and too heavily damaged to be returned to service.

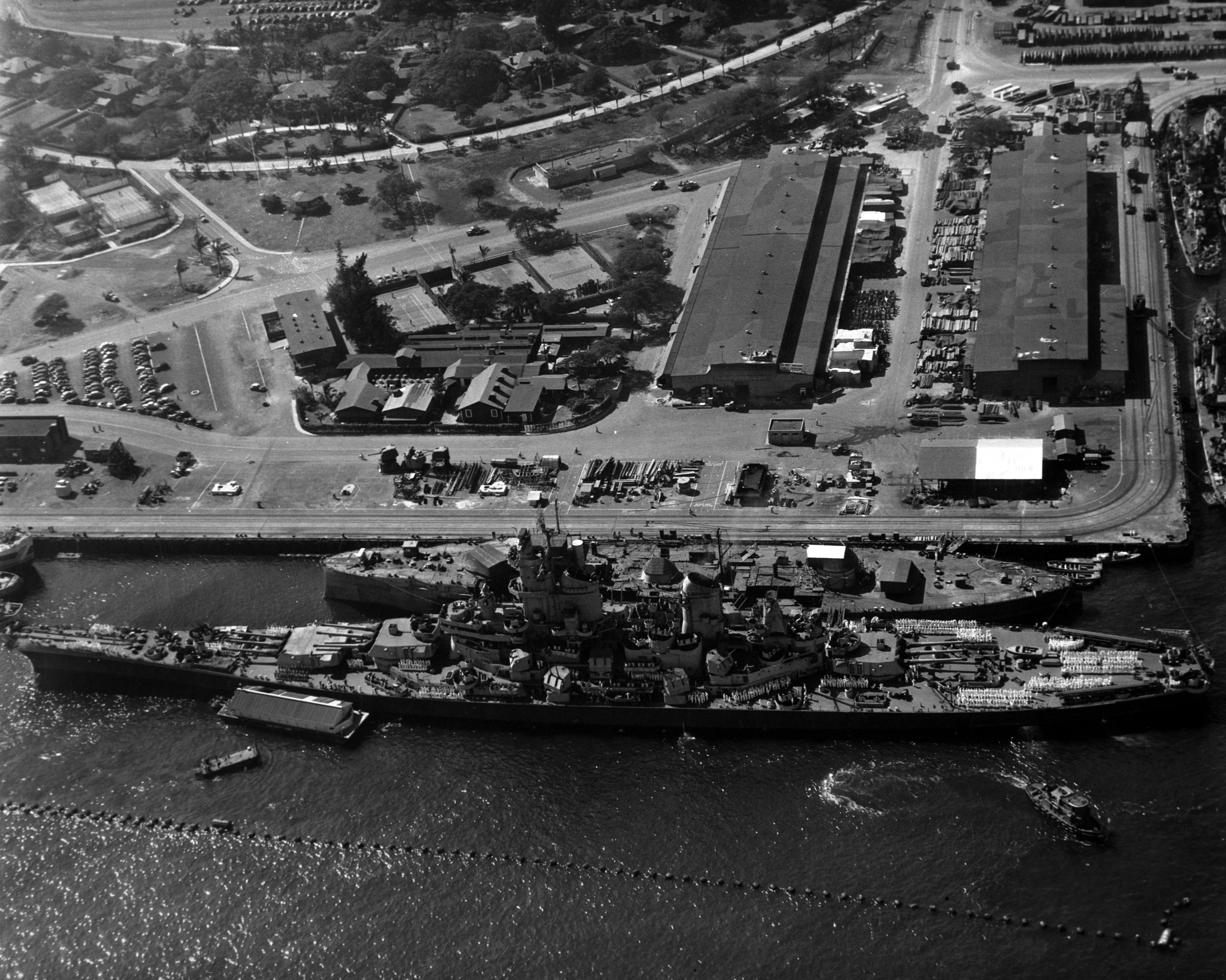
USS Wisconsin is tied up outboard of the hull of Oklahoma at Pearl Harbor Navy Yard on 11 November 1944. Note the great difference in the length of the two battleships.

Oklahoma was decommissioned on 1 September 1944, and all remaining armaments and superstructure were then removed. She was then put up for auction at the Brooklyn Navy Yard on 26 November 1946, with her engines, boilers, turbo generators, steering units and about 24,000 tonnes (23,621 long tons; 26,455 short tons) of structural steel deemed salvageable. She was sold to Moore Drydock Co. of Oakland, California for $46,127.

==== Final voyage ====
In May 1947, a two-tug towing operation began to move the hull of Oklahoma from Pearl Harbor to San Francisco Bay. She was due to arrive on Memorial Day (26 May); a delegation of nearly 500 Oklahomans led by Governor Roy J. Turner planned to visit and pay final respects to the ship.

Disaster struck on 17 May, when the ships entered a storm more than 500 miles (800 km) from Hawaii. The tug Hercules put her searchlight on the former battleship, revealing that she had begun listing heavily. After radioing the naval base at Pearl Harbor, both tugs were instructed to turn around and head back to port. Without warning, Hercules was pulled back past Monarch, which was being dragged backwards at 15 knots (28 km/h; 17 mph). Oklahoma had begun to sink straight down, causing water to swamp the sterns of both tugs.

Both tug skippers had fortunately loosened their cable drums connecting the 1,400-foot (430 m) tow lines to Oklahoma. As the battleship sank rapidly, the line from Monarch quickly played out, releasing the tug. However, Hercules' cables did not release until the last possible moment, leaving her tossing and pitching above the grave of the sunken Oklahoma. The battleship's exact location is unknown.

== Memorials and recovery of remains ==
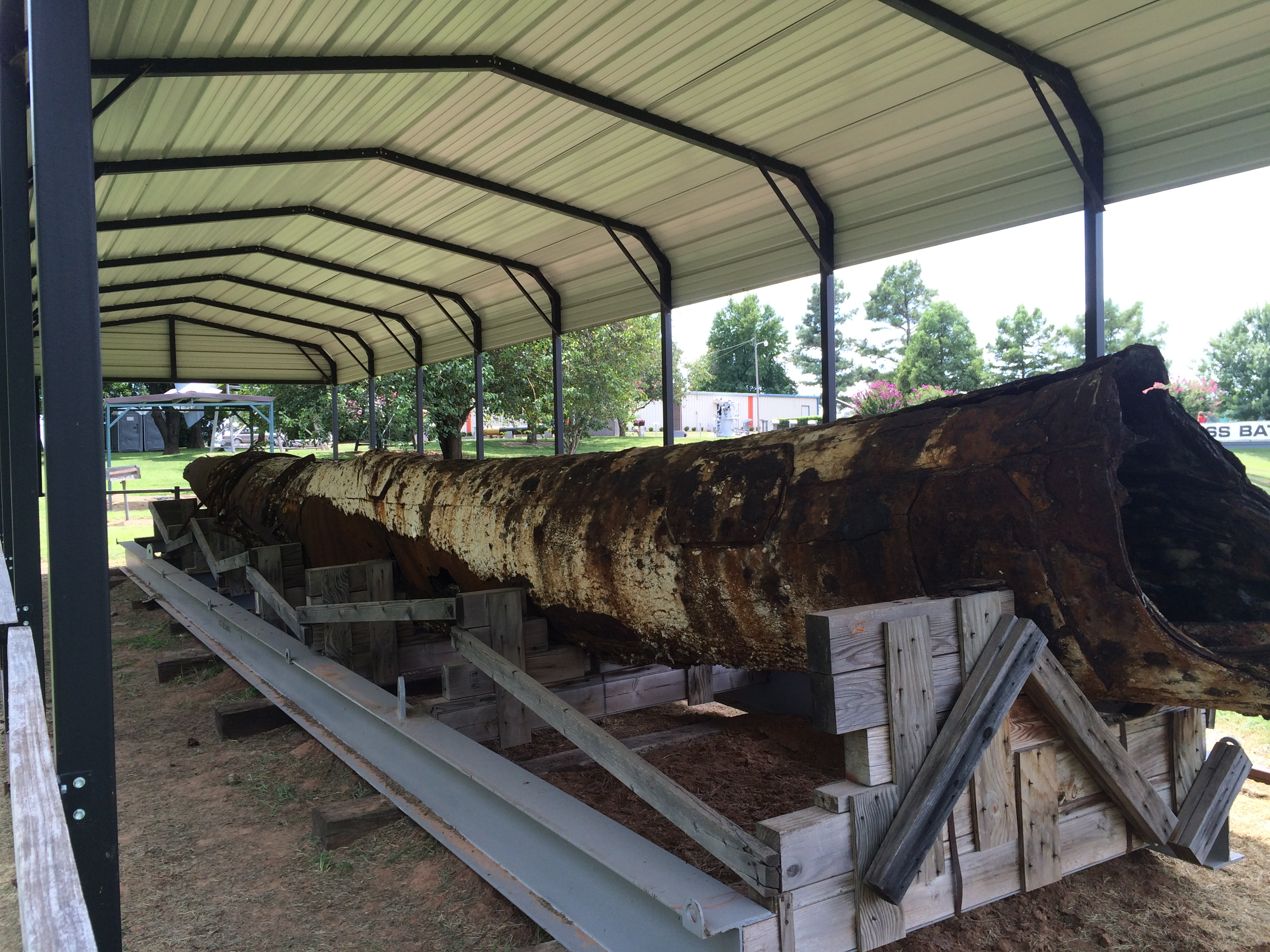
A mast leg from Oklahoma in War Memorial Park in Muskogee, Oklahoma. The mast section is on permanent loan from the Navy.

During dredging operations in 2006, the US Navy recovered a part of Oklahoma from the bottom of Pearl Harbor. The Navy believes it to be a portion of the port side rear fire control tower support mast. It was flown to Tinker Air Force Base then delivered to the Muskogee War Memorial Park in Muskogee, in 2010, where the 40-foot-long (12 m), 25,000-pound (11,340 kg), barnacle-encrusted mast section is now on permanent outdoor display. The ship's bell, a screw and two of her anchors are at the Science Museum in Oklahoma City. Oklahoma's aft wheel is at the Oklahoma History Center in Oklahoma City.

On 7 December 2007, the 66th anniversary of the attack on Pearl Harbor, a memorial for the 429 crew members who were killed in the attack was dedicated on Ford Island, just outside the entrance to where the battleship Missouri is docked as a museum. Missouri is moored where Oklahoma was moored when she was sunk. The USS Oklahoma memorial is part of Pearl Harbor National Memorial and is an arrangement of engraved black granite walls and white marble posts.

=== Identification program ===
Of the 429 sailors and Marines killed in the attack, only 35 were identified in the years following the attack. The remains of 394 unidentified sailors and Marines were first interred as unknowns in the Nu'uanu and Halawa cemeteries, but were all disinterred in 1947, in an unsuccessful attempt to identify more personnel. In 1950, all unidentified remains from Oklahoma were buried in 61 caskets in 45 graves at the National Memorial Cemetery of the Pacific. In April 2015, the Department of Defense announced, as part of a policy change that established threshold criteria for disinterment of unknowns, that the unidentified remains of the crew members of Oklahoma would be exhumed for DNA analysis, with the goal of returning identified remains to their families. The process began in June 2015, when four graves, two individual and two group graves, were disinterred for DNA analysis by the Defense POW/MIA Accounting Agency (DPAA). By December 2017, the identity of 100 crew members had been discovered, and with the numbers of sailor and Marine identities increasing at a steady pace, the 200th unknown was identified by 26 February 2019. Throughout 2019 and 2020, the DPAA continued to successfully identify more crew members, and on 4 February 2021, they announced the identity of the 300th unknown.

As of 29 June 2021, the DPAA announced that the program was coming to a close, and that the remains of 51 crew members that could not be identified have been returned to Hawaii, and will be reinterred at the National Memorial Cemetery of the Pacific at Punchbowl Crater, with a ceremony scheduled for 7 December, the 80th anniversary of the Attack on Pearl Harbor. The program identified 343 crew members, including two Medal of Honor recipients, giving the DPAA a success rate of 88%. DPAA Director Kelly McKeague stated she had hoped to be able to identify at least a few more crew members before the program shut down, and in time for the ceremony. On 17 September 2021, the Department of Defense announced that number of identified was 346. After a final push to identify as many of the remaining unknown crew members as possible, the Department of Defense announced that they had identified a total 396 of 429 crew members, improving their success rate to 92.3%. As was previously planned, the crew remains that could not be identified, numbering only 33, would be reinterred at the Punchbowl Cemetery, during a ceremony on 7 December, that will coincide with the anniversary of the attack on Pearl Harbor, 80 years earlier.

== Honors, awards and memorabilia ==
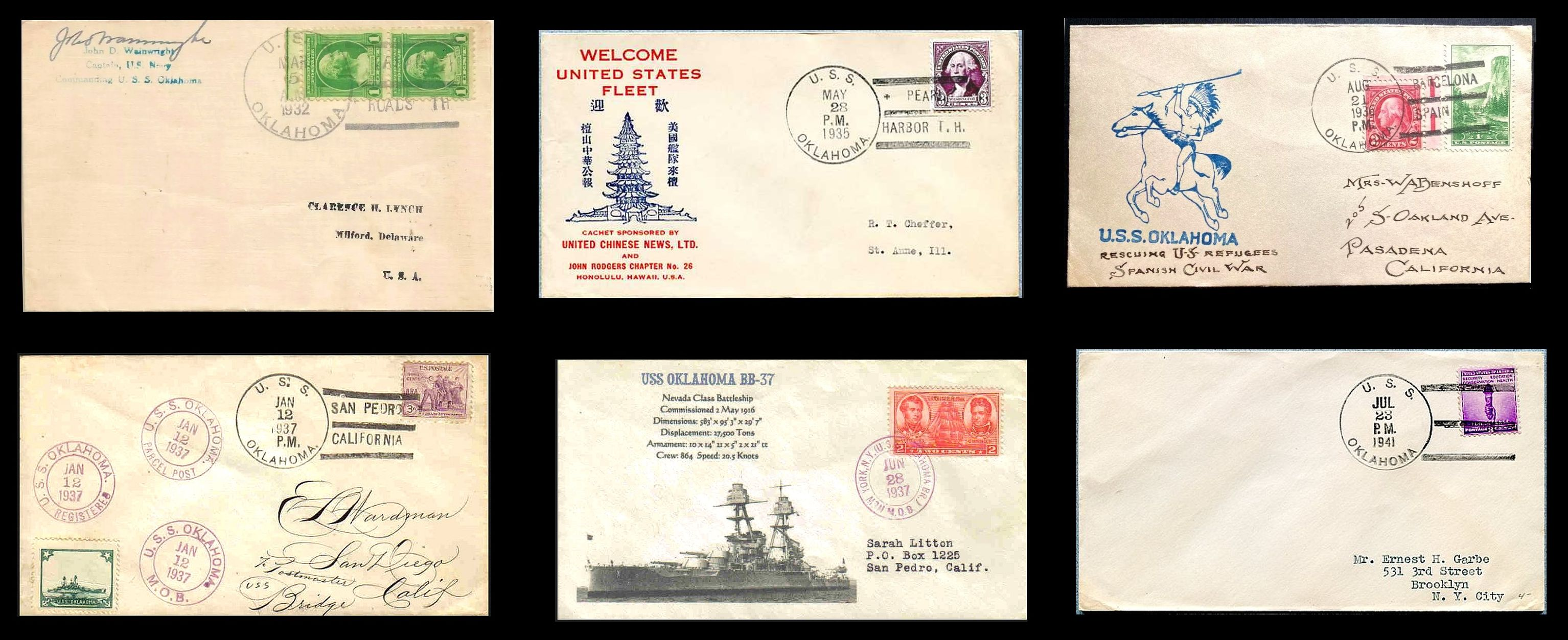
Selection of naval covers from crew members Postmarked with ship's cancellation at naval post office aboard the USS Oklahoma

- World War I Victory Medal
- Asiatic-Pacific Campaign Medal with battle star
- World War II Victory Medal

== See also ==
- List of commanding officers of USS Oklahoma (BB-37)
- List of U.S. Navy losses in World War II
- Pearl Harbor Survivors Association
