= USS England (DLG-22) =

1962 Leahy-class cruiser

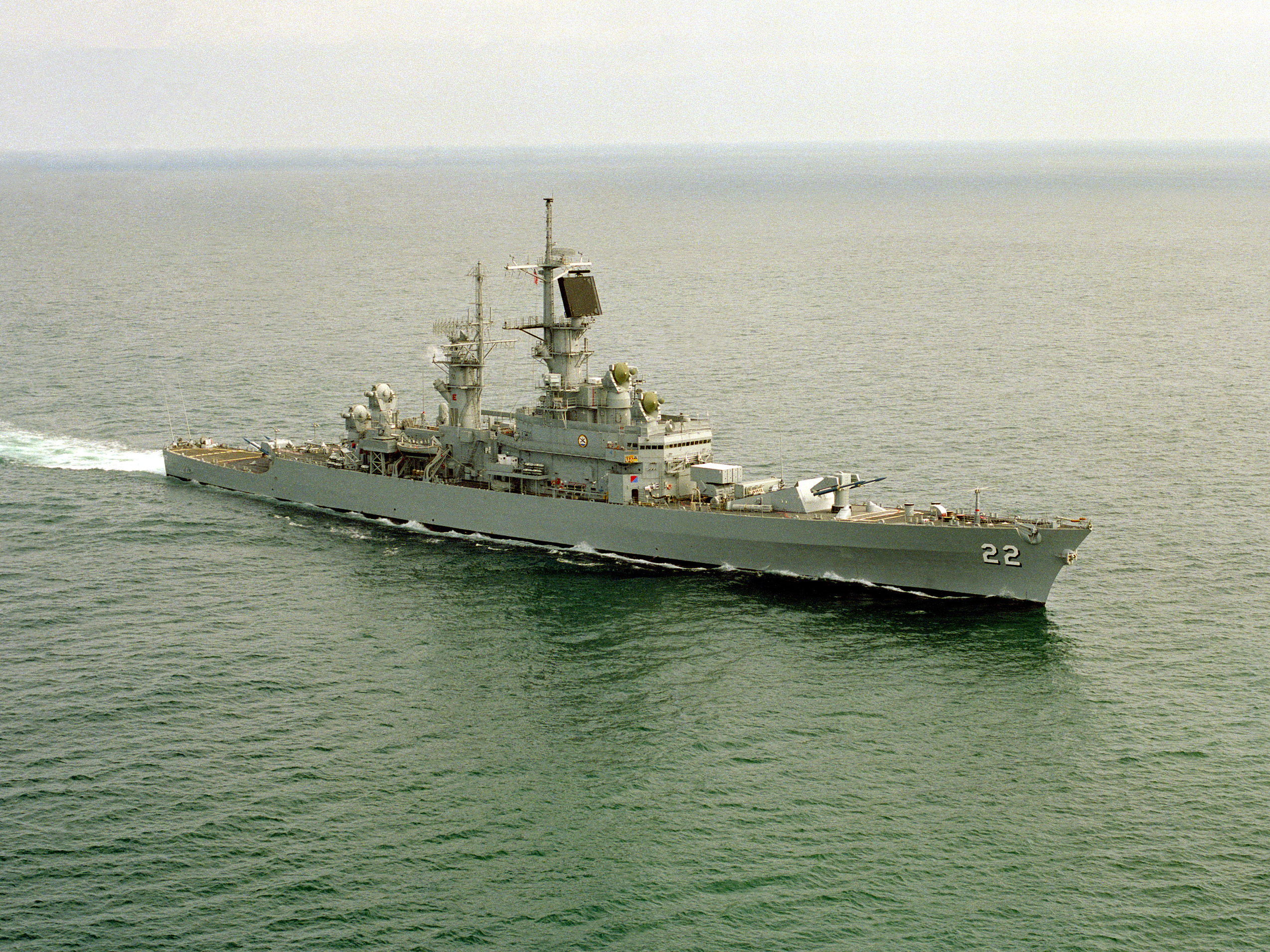

History

United States
- Name: England
- Namesake: John C. England
- Builder: Todd Shipyards, Los Angeles Division, San Pedro, California
- Laid down: 4 October 1960
- Launched: 6 March 1962
- Acquired: 16 June 1971
- Commissioned: 7 December 1963
- Decommissioned: 21 January 1994
- Reclassified: CG-22 on 30 June 1975
- Stricken: 21 January 1994
- Fate: Scrapped 2004
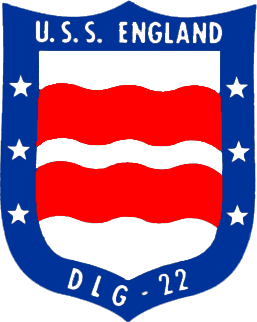
- Badge

General characteristics
- Class & type: Leahy-class cruiser
- Displacement: 7,903 tons
- Length: 533 ft (162 m)
- Beam: 53 ft (16 m)
- Draft: 24 ft 6 in (7.47 m)
- Propulsion: 2 × De Laval steam turbines providing 85,000 shp (63 MW); 2 shafts; 4 × Foster-Wheeler boilers
- Speed: 34 knots (63 km/h; 39 mph)
- Range: 8,000 nautical miles (15,000 km; 9,200 mi) at 20 knots (37 km/h; 23 mph)
- Complement: 400 officers and enlisted
- Sensors & processing systems: AN/SPS-39 followed by AN/SPS-48 3D air search radar; AN/SPS-43 followed by AN/SPS-49 2D air search radar; AN/SPS-10 surface search radar; AN/SPG-55 missile fire control radar; AN/SQS-23 bow mounted sonar
- Electronic warfare & decoys: AN/SLQ-32; Mark 36 SRBOC
- Armament: 2 × Mark 10 missile launcher for RIM-2 Terrier missiles; 1 × 8-cell RUR-5 ASROC antisubmarine launcher; 2 x twin 76 mm (3.0 in) guns (replaced by quad Harpoon missiles during 1980s); 2 × Mark 32 triple 12.75 in (324 mm) torpedo tubes; 2 × Phalanx CIWS

USS England (DLG/CG-22), was a Leahy-class guided missile cruiser in service with the United States Navy from 1963 to 1994. She was scrapped in 2004.

== History ==
England named in honor of Ensign John C. England. He was born in Harris, Missouri, on 11 December 1920. He attended Pasadena City College, in Pasadena, California, and was on the pep-squad there. He enlisted in the Naval Reserve on 6 September 1940 and was commissioned ensign on 6 June 1941. On 3 September 1941 he reported for duty on the battleship Oklahoma and was killed three months later while saving others aboard during the Japanese attack on Pearl Harbor on 7 December 1941.

CG/DLG-22 was the second USS England. The first was England (DE-635), the ship that sank six enemy submarines in 12 days in May 1944. That act caused the Chief of Naval Operations, Admiral Ernest King, to declare "There’ll always be an England in the United States Navy." DE-635 was decommissioned in 1945.

To fulfill Admiral King's promise, USS England DLG-22 was built by Todd Shipyards, Los Angeles Division, San Pedro, California. The keel was laid on 4 October 1960, launched 6 March 1962, and commissioned on 7 December 1963. Her designation was changed in 1976 to CG-22 at Bremerton Naval Shipyard during an overhaul.

England served in every major Pacific engagement from Vietnam to Desert Storm, from rescuing pilots, performing as plane guard or picket, to showing force around the globe. England was awarded the Navy Unit Commendation Ribbon for supporting search and rescue operations in the Gulf of Tonkin from 3 January to 6 June 1966.

Originally called a "destroyer leader" or frigate (DLG), in 1975 she was re-designated a cruiser (CG) in the United States Navy 1975 ship reclassification.

England was awarded the Navy Unit Commendation a final time for actions performed 2 to 16 August 1990. As the leading Naval Warship in the region, England assumed primary shipping interdiction and air defense roles while forces were mobilized to support what would become Operation Desert Shield. She was decommissioned on 21 January 1994, mothballed in the Suisun Bay for ten years and was sold for scrap to International Shipbreaking Ltd., Brownsville, Texas (US). Scrapping was completed on 20 October 2004.
