= Roger Welles =

United States naval officer (1862–1932)

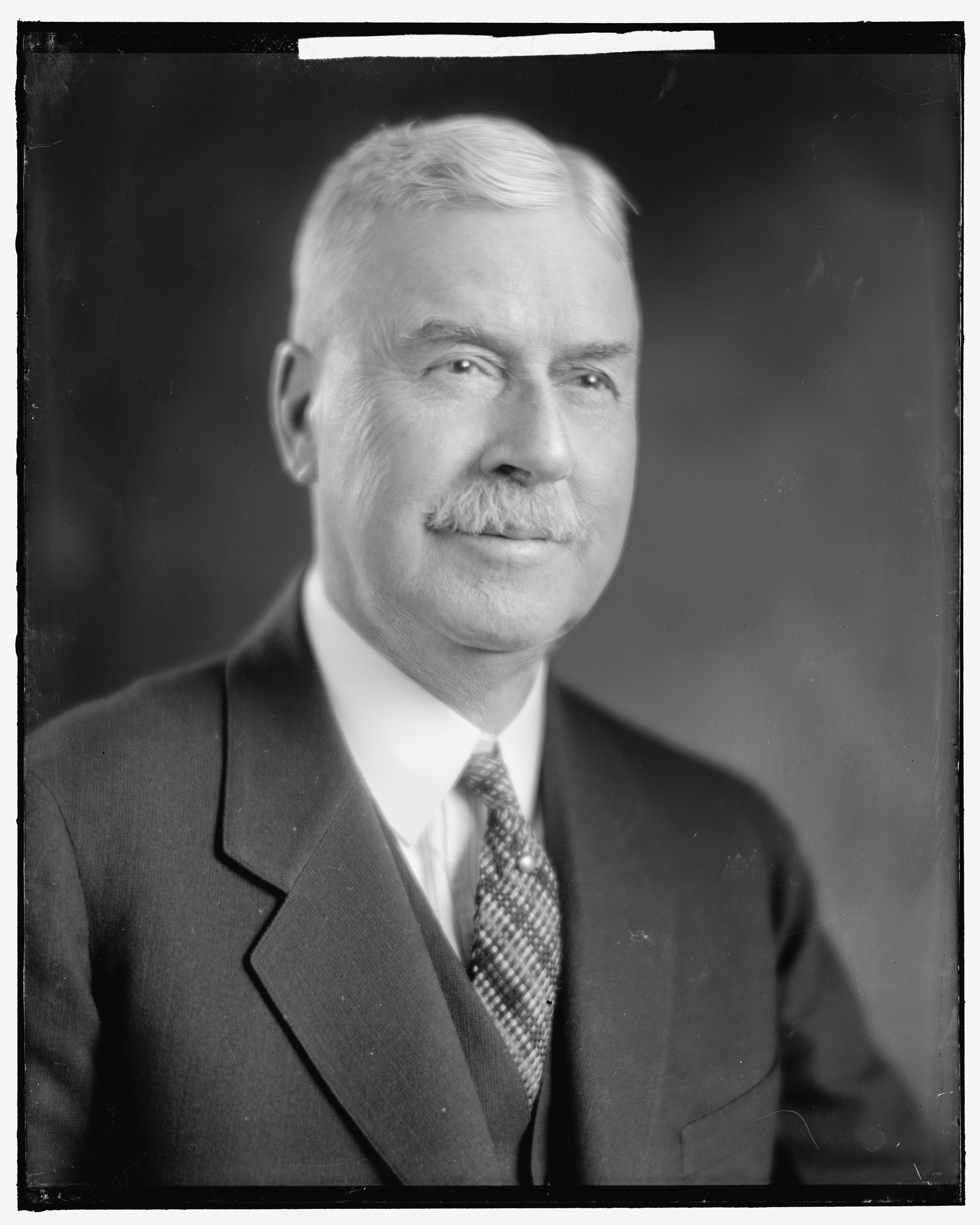
- Roger Wells, Director of Naval Intelligence
- Born: December 7, 1862; Newington, Connecticut, U.S.
- Died: April 26, 1932 (aged 69)
- Burial place: Newington Cemetery
- Military career
- Allegiance: United States of America
- Branch: United States Navy
- Rank: Rear Admiral
- Commands: Office of Naval Intelligence
- Awards: Navy Cross

Roger Welles (1862–1932) was a U.S. naval officer, the first commander of USS Oklahoma and appointed the first "Navy Mayor" of San Diego.

Welles gave 33 years service to the navy in a variety of placements, eventually being promoted to Rear-Admiral. As an ensign, he was engaged in surveys in Alaska, where he made a study of native people's culture and language in his spare time. He served two years in the post of Special Counsel to the World's Columbian Exposition in Chicago, and was awarded by its Board for research on Orinoco River Indians. As a former commander of the Naval Training Center in Newport, his command of the Oklahoma was a short period of time, mainly involving the command as a training ship. This was because the oil-fired boilers that he used were not able to be fuelled in England, as German U-boats had drained their supply. After he gave command over to Rear Admiral Spencer K. Wood, he was appointed Director of the Office of Naval Intelligence (April 1917 – January 1919).

He then became Commandant of the 11th Naval District, during which period he took the final measures to establish the San Diego Naval Base.

Welles married Harriet Deen Gardner on 17 October 1908, who followed her husband's ship to Asia and later published accounts of journeys in Scribner's Magazine and the popular book Anchors Aweigh. He was entered on the Navy's Retired List on 7 December 1926, upon attaining the age of 64, and died in New York on 26 April 1932.
