= Gold Star Mothers =

Gold Star mothers are women entitled to display a gold star on a service flag as the mother, stepmother, adoptive mother or foster mother of a United States Armed Forces member that died while engaged in action against an enemy recognized by the Secretary of Defense.

Gold Star Mothers may also refer to:

- American Gold Star Mothers, an organization for Gold Star mothers
- Gold Star Mothers National Monument, a proposed national monument commemorating the sacrifices of Gold Star mothers

== See also ==
- Gold Star Lapel Button, United States official decoration for direct next of kin of service members who died in armed hostilities
- Gold Star Fathers Act of 2014, proposed US law to expand preferred eligibility for federal jobs to the fathers of certain disabled or deceased veterans
- Gold Star Wives of America, nonprofit organization supporting spouses and children of service members who died in World War II
