= Citizens Flag Alliance =

The Citizens Flag Alliance (CFA) is an American organization advocating in favor of the Flag Burning Amendment project. CFA was founded in 1989 by the American Legion and originally called the Citizens' Flag Honor Guard.

== Member organizations ==
Over 140 organizations "representing millions of Americans" have joined the Alliance since it was incorporated in June 1994. Notable member organizations include:

- AMVETS (American Veterans)
- Air Force Association
- Air Force Sergeants Association
- American GI Forum of the U.S.
- American Legion
- American Legion Auxiliary
- American War Mothers
- Ancient Order of Hibernians
- Association of the U.S. Army
- Benevolent and Protective Order of Elks
- Catholic War Veterans
- Daughters of the American Colonists
- Drum Corps Associates
- Family Research Council
- Fleet Reserve Association
- Forty and Eight veterans organization
- Gold Star Wives of America, Inc.
- Grand Aerie, Fraternal Order of Eagles
- Grand Lodge Fraternal Order of Police
- Great Council of Texas, Order of Red Men
- Hungarian Reformed Federation of America
- Jewish War Veterans of the USA
- Knights of Columbus
- MBNA America
- Marine Corps League
- Military Officers Association of Indianapolis, MOAA (formally The Retired Officers Association of Indianapolis, TROA)
- Military Order of the Purple Heart of the U.S.A.
- The Military Order of the Foreign Wars
- Moose International
- National Alliance of Families for the Return of America's Missing Servicemen
- National Center for Public Policy Research
- National Defense Committee
- National Federation of State High School Associations
- National FFA (Future Farmers of America)
- National Grange
- National Guard Association of the United States
- National League of Families of American Prisoners and Missing in SE Asia
- National Society of the Daughters of the American Revolution
- National Society of the Sons of the American Revolution
- Native Daughters of the Golden West
- Native Sons of the Golden West
- Naval Enlisted Reserve Association (NERA)
- Navy League of the United States
- Polish American Congress
- Polish Falcons of America
- Polish Home Army
- Polish Legion of American Veterans, U.S.A.
- Polish Legion of American Veterans Ladies Auxiliary
- Polish National Alliance
- Polish Roman Catholic Union of North America
- Polish Women's Alliance
- Ruritan National
- Scottish Rite of Freemasonry - Northern Masonic Jurisdiction
- Supreme Council, Scottish Rite (Southern Jurisdiction, USA)
- Sons of Confederate Veterans
- Sons of Union Veterans of the Civil War
- Standing Rock Sioux Tribe
- The General Society, Sons of the Revolution
- Reserve Officers Association of the United States
- Women's Army Corps Veterans' Association
- Women's Overseas Service League
- Woodmen of the World

== See also ==
- Flag desecration
