= Vehicle registration plates of Iowa =

Iowa vehicle license plates

Iowa
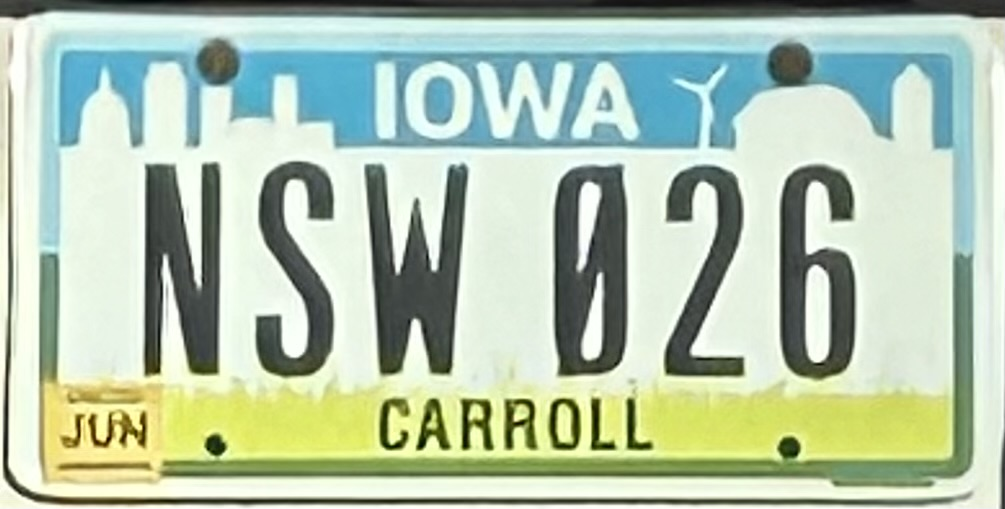

Current series
- Slogan: county name
- Size: 12 in × 6 in 30 cm × 15 cm
- Material: Aluminum
- Serial format: ABC 123
- Introduced: April 1, 2018

Availability
- Issued by: Iowa Department of Transportation, Motor Vehicle Division

History
- First issued: January 1, 1911 (pre-state plates from 1904 to December 31, 1910)

The U.S. state of Iowa first required its residents to register their motor vehicles in 1904. Registrants provided their own license plates for display until 1911, when the state began to issue plates.

As of 2026, plates are issued by the Iowa Department of Transportation through its Motor Vehicle Division. Front and rear plates are required for most classes of vehicles, while only rear plates are required for motorcycles and trailers.

== Passenger baseplates ==
=== Prestate ===
Image	Dates issued	Description	Serial format	Serials issued	Notes
	1904 to 1910 (prestate)	Riveted metal numbers on black leather plate, "IA" riveted on right	12345	1 to approximately 13000	

=== 1911 to 1971 ===
In 1956, the United States, Canada, and Mexico came to an agreement with the American Association of Motor Vehicle Administrators, the Automobile Manufacturers Association and the National Safety Council that standardized the size for license plates for vehicles (except those for motorcycles) at 6 inches (15 cm) in height by 12 inches (30 cm) in width, with standardized mounting holes. The 1955 (dated 1956) issue was the first Iowa license plate that complied with these standards.

Image	Dates issued	Description	Slogan	Serial format	Serials issued	Notes
	1911	Embossed white serial on dark blue plate with border line; "IA 1911" at right	none	12345	2001 to approximately 30000	
	1912	Embossed white serial on black plate; "IA 1912" at right	none	12345	1001 to approximately 46000	
	1913	Embossed black serial on white plate; "IA 1913" at right	none	12345	3001 to approximately 75000	
	1914	Embossed white serial on black plate; "IA 1914" at right	none	123456	6001 to approximately 112000	
	1915	Embossed black serial on yellow plate; "IA 1915" at right	none	123456	7001 to approximately 152000	
	1916–18	Embossed beige serial on dark olive green plate; "IA" and dash at right	none	123456	1 to approximately 341000	Intentionally used for three years straight.
	1919	Embossed white serial on brown plate; "IA 19" at right	none	123456	1 to approximately 362000	
	1920	Embossed black serial on light green plate with border line; "IA 20" at right	none	123456	1 to approximately 438000	
	1921	Embossed silver serial on black plate with border line; "IA 21" at right	none	123456	1 to approximately 441000	
	1922	Embossed black serial on silver plate with border line; "IA 22" at right	none	1-12345; 10-1234	Coded by county of issuance (1 or 10)	First use of county codes.
	1923	Embossed yellow serial on black plate with border line; "IA 23" at right	none	1-12345; 10-1234	Coded by county of issuance (1 or 10)	
	1924	Embossed white serial on black plate with border line; "IA 24" at right	none	1-12345; 10-1234	Coded by county of issuance (1 or 10)	
	1925	Embossed black serial on gray plate with border line; "IA 25" at right	none	1-12345; 10-1234	Coded by county of issuance (1 or 10)	
	1926	Embossed white serial on maroon plate with border line; "IA 26" at right	none	1-12345; 10-1234	Coded by county of issuance (1 or 10)	
	1927	Embossed orange serial on dark blue plate with border line; "IA 27" at right	none	A-12345; 1-1234; 10-1234	Coded by county of issuance (A, 1 or 10)	
	1928	Embossed black serial on white plate with border line; "IA 28" at right	none	A-12345; 1-1234; 10-1234	Coded by county of issuance (A, 1 or 10)	
	1929	Embossed black serial on green plate with border line; vertical "IOWA" and "1929" at right	Truck plates have a vertical "TRUCK" instead of the dash	A-12345; 1-1234; 10-1234	Coded by county of issuance (A, 1 or 10)	First use of the full state name.
	1930	Embossed white serial on dark blue plate with border line; "IOWA-1930" centered at bottom	none	1-12345; 10-12345	Coded by county of issuance (1 or 10)	
	1931	Embossed dark blue serial on white plate with border line; "IOWA-1931" centered at bottom	none	1-12345; 10-12345	Coded by county of issuance (1 or 10)	
	1932	Embossed white serial on maroon plate with border line; "IOWA-1932" centered at bottom	none	1-12345; 10-12345	Coded by county of issuance (1 or 10)	
	1933	Embossed white serial on dark blue plate with border line; "IOWA-1933" centered at top	none	1-12345; 10-12345	Coded by county of issuance (1 or 10)	
	1934	Embossed yellow serial on dark blue plate with border line; "IOWA-1934" centered at bottom	none	1-12345; 10-12345	Coded by county of issuance (1 or 10)	
	1935	Embossed white serial on dark blue plate with border line; "IOWA-1935" centered at top	none	1-12345; 10-12345	Coded by county of issuance (1 or 10)	
	1936	Embossed dark blue serial on white plate with border line; "IOWA-1936" centered at bottom	none	1-12345; 10-12345	Coded by county of issuance (1 or 10)	
	1937	Embossed white serial on dark blue plate with border line; "1937-IOWA" centered at bottom	none	1-12345; 10-12345	Coded by county of issuance (1 or 10)	
	1938	Embossed dark blue serial on white plate with border line; "IOWA-1938" centered at top	none	1-12345; 10-12345	Coded by county of issuance (1 or 10)	
	1939	Embossed white serial on dark blue plate with border line; "IOWA-1939" centered at bottom	none	1-12345; 10-12345	Coded by county of issuance (1 or 10)	
	1940	Embossed dark blue serial on orange plate with border line; "IOWA-1940" centered at top	none	1-12345; 10-12345	Coded by county of issuance (1 or 10)	
	1941	Embossed black serial on white plate with border line; "IOWA-1941" centered at bottom	none	1-12345; 10-12345	Coded by county of issuance (1 or 10)	
	1942–44	Embossed white serial on black plate with border line; "IOWA-1942" centered at top	none	1-12345; 10-12345	Coded by county of issuance (1 or 10)	Revalidated for 1943 and 1944 with windshield stickers, due to metal conservation for World War II.
	1945	Embossed black serial on white plate with border line; "IOWA-1945" centered at top	none	1-12345; 10-12345	Coded by county of issuance (1 or 10)	Only rear plates issued due to ongoing metal conservation; a windshield sticker was carried at the front of the vehicle.
	1946	Embossed white serial on black plate with border line; "IOWA-1946" centered at top	none	1-12345; 10-12345	Coded by county of issuance (1 or 10)	
	1947–48	Embossed black serial on white plate with border line; "1947-IOWA" centered at top	none	1-12345; 10-12345	Coded by county of issuance (1 or 10)	Revalidated for 1948 with silver tabs.
	1949	Embossed white serial on waffle-textured black plate with border line; "IOWA-1949" centered at top	none	1-12345; 10-12345	Coded by county of issuance (1 or 10)	
	1950–51	Embossed black serial on white plate with border line; "IOWA" centered at top; "19" at top left and "50" at top right	none	1-12345; 10-12345	Coded by county of issuance (1 or 10)	Revalidated for 1951 with silver tabs.
	1952	Embossed white serial on black plate with border line; "IOWA" centered at top; "19" at top left and "52" at top right	none	1-12345; 10-12345	Coded by county of issuance (1 or 10)	
	1953–55	Embossed black serial on white plate with border line; "IOWA" centered at top; "19" at top left and "53" at top right	"THE CORN STATE" centered at bottom	1-12345; 10-12345	Coded by county of issuance (1 or 10)	First use of a slogan of any kind, with the state's unofficial nickname chosen over the official nickname of "The Hawkeye State". Revalidated for 1954 and 1955 with silver tabs.
	1956–57	Embossed white serial on black plate with border line; "IOWA" centered at top; "19" at top left and "56" at top right	none	1-1234; 1-A123; 1-1A23; 10-1234; 10-A123; 10-1A23; 77-12A3; 77-123A; 77-AB12	1-0001 to approximately 99-9999; 1-A000 to approx. 99-Z999 (212,762 plates were issued in 20 counties); 1-0A00 to approx. 99-9Z99 (76,955 in 6 counties); 77-00A0 to 77-99Z9 (20,000 in Polk county); 77-000A to 77-999Z (20,000 in Polk county); 77-AA00 to 77-FC79 (10,280 in Polk County)	First 6" x 12" plate. I, M, O, Q, W and Y not used in lettered serial formats. Revalidated for 1957 with silver tabs. Coded by county of issuance (1 or 10)
	1958	Embossed black serial on white plate with border line; "IOWA" centered at top; "58" at top right	none	1-12345; 1/0-12345	Coded by county of issuance (1 or 1/0)	
	1959	Embossed black serial on yellow plate with border line; "IOWA" centered at top; "59" at top right	none	1 12345; 1/0 12345	Coded by county of issuance (1 or 1/0)	
	1960	Embossed black serial on light gray plate with border line; "IOWA" centered at top; "60" at top right	none	1 12345; 1/0 123456	Coded by county of issuance (1 or 1/0)	
	1961	As 1959 base, but with "61" at top right	none	1 12345; 1/0 123456	Coded by county of issuance (1 or 1/0)	
	1962	As 1960 base, but with "62" at top right	none	1 12345; 1/0 123456	Coded by county of issuance (1 or 1/0)	
	1963	Embossed white serial on black plate with border line; "IOWA" centered at top; "63" at top right	none	1 12345; 1/0 123456	Coded by county of issuance (1 or 1/0)	
	1964	Embossed white serial on green plate with border line; "IOWA" centered at top; "64" at top right	none	1-12345; 1/0 123456	Coded by county of issuance (1 or 1/0)	
	1965	Embossed white serial on dark blue plate with border line; "IOWA" centered at top; "65" at top right	none	1-12345; 1/0 123456	Coded by county of issuance (1 or 1/0)	
	1966	Embossed white serial on red plate with border line; "IOWA" centered at top; "66" at top right	none	1-12345; 1/0 123456	Coded by county of issuance (1 or 1/0)	
	1967	Embossed black serial on reflective white plate with border line; "IOWA" centered at top; "67" at top right	none	1-12345; 1/0 123456	Coded by county of issuance (1 or 1/0)	
	1968	Embossed red serial on reflective white plate with border line; "IOWA" centered at top; "68" at top right	none	1-12345; 1/0 123456	Coded by county of issuance (1 or 1/0)	
	1969	As 1967 base, but with "69" at top right	none	1-12345; 1/0 123456	Coded by county of issuance (1 or 1/0)	
	1970	As 1968 base, but with "70" at top right	none	1-12345; 1/0 123456	Coded by county of issuance (1 or 1/0)	
	1971	As 1967 base, but with "71" at top right	none	1-12345; 1/0 123456	Coded by county of issuance (1 or 1/0)	

=== 1972 to present ===
Image	Dates issued	Description	Slogan	Serial format	Serials issued	Notes
	1972–74	Embossed black serial on reflective yellow plate with border line; "IOWA 72" centered at top; black sticker box at top right	none	1 123456; 1/0 123456	Coded by county of issuance (1 or 10)	Revalidated for 1973 and 1974 with stickers.
	1975–78	Embossed black serial on reflective white plate with border line; "IOWA 75" centered at top	none	1 ABC123; 1/0 ABC123	Coded by county of issuance (ABC and either1 or 10)	Three-letter serials assigned in blocks to each county (1 or 1/0); this practice continued until circa 1980-1985. See the County Coding table below for each assignment. Non-resident plates initially had "NON RESIDENT" at the bottom and no 0/0 code at the far left.
	1979 – December 1984	Reflective white serial on green plate with border line; "IOWA" and county name centered at top and bottom respectively; "79" at top right; all embossed. Plate elements either embossed (above) or debossed (below)	county name	ABC 123	AAA 000 to approximately KCZ 999	County codes abolished after 57 years, replaced by county names at bottom of plate. Whether the plate was embossed or debossed depended on the county of issuance. The serial blocks initially assigned were the same as those on the 1975–78 base. Non-resident plates had blank bottoms.
	January 1985 – December 1996	Embossed reflective white serial on blue plate with border line; "IOWA" and county name centered at top and bottom respectively; "86" at top right	county name	ABC 123	LAA 000 to YZZ 999	Non-resident plates discontinued. Month and year stickers are separate, and vanity plates had blank bottoms.
	January 1997 – 1998	Embossed blue serial on reflective graphic plate with light blue sky, white city skyline and gray farm scene; "IOWA" screened in blue centered at top; county name on sticker centered at bottom	county name	123 ABC	000 AAA to 399 FSK	'D' series not used.
	1998 – mid 2001	As above, but with county name screened in blue	county name	123 ABC	Exclusively from 400 FSK to approximately 999 HMY; intermittently from 000 HMZ to approximately 999 JYC	
	mid 2000 – July; 2011	As above, but with serial screened rather than embossed	county name	123 ABC	Intermittently from 000 HMZ to approximately 999 JYC; exclusively from 000 JYD to approximately 999 YPK	Originally issued in eight most populous counties (Black Hawk, Dubuque, Johnson, Linn, Polk, Pottawattamie, Scott, Woodbury); issued in all counties from mid-2001. Series KDA through KZC skipped in error; SAA through SHG reserved for Special plates; 'U' and 'V' series not used.
	July; 2011 – late 2012	As above, but with serial, state name and county name in black rather than blue	county name	123 ABC	000 YPL to 999 ZZZ	Elements changed from blue to black in order to reduce costs and improve legibility. Zeros in serials became slashed at the beginning of the YYA series (early 2012).
	late 2012 – April; 2018	As above, but with serial, state name and county name in black rather than blue	county name	ABC 123	AAA 000 to approximately GXV 199	No I, O, Q used as 3rd letter.
	April 2018 – present	Screened black serial on reflective graphic plate with blue sky, white city skyline, farm and wind turbine, and green grass field; "IOWA" screened in white centered at top; county name screened in black centered at bottom	county name	ABC 123	GXV 200 to QBW 361 (as of September 14, 2025)	In August 2017, this "City and Country Reboot" design was chosen by voters at the 2017 Iowa State Fair and on the Iowa State Fair's website. Competing against a "Flying Our Colors" design and a "Great Wide Open" design, the new "City and Country Reboot" license plate won the contest with 113,299 votes cast out of a total of 291,095 votes. No I, O, Q used as 3rd letter.

== County coding ==
County	Code, 1928–29	Code, 1930–78	3-letter block, 1975–84
Adair	1	1	AAA–AAZ
Adams	2	2	ABA–ABZ
Allamakee	3	3	ACA–ACZ
Appanoose	4	4	ADA–ADZ
Audubon	5	5	AEA–AEZ
Benton	6	6	AFA–AGZ
Black Hawk	H	7	AHA–AMZ
Boone	7	8	ANA–AOZ
Bremer	8	9	APA–AQZ
Buchanan	9	10	ARA–ARZ
Buena Vista	10	11	ASA–ATZ
Butler	11	12	AUA–AUZ
Calhoun	12	13	AVA–AVZ
Carroll	13	14	AWA–AXZ
Cass	14	15	AYA–AYZ
Cedar	15	16	AZA–AZZ
Cerro Gordo	M	17	BAA–BCZ
Cherokee	16	18	BDA–BDZ
Chickasaw	17	19	BEA–BEZ
Clarke	18	20	BFA–BFZ
Clay	19	21	BGA–BGZ
Clayton	20	22	BHA–BIZ
Clinton	K	23	BJA–BLZ
Crawford	21	24	BMA–BMZ
Dallas	22	25	BNA–BOZ
Davis	23	26	BPA–BPZ
Decatur	24	27	BQA–BQZ
Delaware	25	28	BRB–BRZ
Des Moines	N	29	BSA–BUZ
Dickinson	26	30	BVA–BVZ
Dubuque	J	31	BWA–CAZ
Emmet	27	32	CBA–CBZ
Fayette	28	33	CCA–CDZ
Floyd	29	34	CEA–CFZ
Franklin	30	35	CGA–CGZ
Fremont	31	36	CHA–CHZ
Greene	32	37	CIA–CIZ
Grundy	33	38	CJA–CJZ
Guthrie	34	39	CKA–CKZ
Hamilton	35	40	CLA–CMZ
Hancock	36	41	CNA–CNZ
Hardin	37	42	COA–CPZ
Harrison	38	43	CQA–CQZ
Henry	39	44	CRA–CRZ
Howard	40	45	CSA–CSZ
Humboldt	41	46	CTA–CTZ
Ida	42	47	CUA–CUZ
Iowa	43	48	CVA–CVZ
Jackson	44	49	CWA–CWZ
Jasper	P	50	CXA–CYZ
Jefferson	45	51	CZA–CZZ
Johnson	46	52	DAA–DDZ
Jones	47	53	DEA–DEZ
Keokuk	48	54	DFA–DFZ
Kossuth	49	55	DGA–DHZ
Lee	R	56	DIA–DLZ
Linn	C	57	DMA–DTZ
Louisa	50	58	DUA–DUZ
Lucas	51	59	DVA–DVZ
Lyon	52	60	DWA–DWZ
Madison	53	61	DXA–DXZ
Mahaska	54	62	DYA–DZZ
Marion	55	63	EAA–EBZ
Marshall	56	64	ECA–EEZ
Mills	57	65	EFA–EFZ
Mitchell	58	66	EGA–EGZ
Monona	59	67	EHA–EHZ
Monroe	60	68	EIA–EIZ
Montgomery	61	69	EJA–EJZ
Muscatine	62	70	EKA–ELZ
O'Brien	63	71	EMA–EMZ
Osceola	64	72	ENA–ENZ
Page	65	73	EOA–EOZ
Palo Alto	66	74	EPA–EPZ
Plymouth	67	75	EQA–ERZ
Pocahontas	68	76	ESA–ESZ
Polk	A	77	FAA–FPZ
Pottawattamie	F	78	FQA–FUZ
Poweshiek	69	79	FVA–FVZ
Ringgold	70	80	FWA–FWZ
Sac	71	81	FXA–FXZ
Scott	E	82	GAA–GHZ
Shelby	72	83	GIA–GIZ
Sioux	73	84	GJA–GKZ
Story	74	85	GLA–GNZ
Tama	75	86	GOA–GOZ
Taylor	76	87	GPA–GPZ
Union	77	88	GQA–GQZ
Van Buren	78	89	GRA–GRZ
Wapello	79	90	GSA–GUZ
Warren	80	91	GVA–GWZ
Washington	81	92	GXA–GXZ
Wayne	82	93	GYA–GYZ
Webster	L	94	HAA–HCZ
Winnebago	83	95	HDA–HDZ
Winneshiek	84	96	HEA–HEZ
Woodbury	B	97	HFA–HKZ
Worth	85	98	HLA–HLZ
Wright	86	99	HMA–HMZ
Non-resident	00	00	HNA–HNZ

== Current non-passenger and optional plates ==
=== Non-passenger plates ===
Image	Type	First issued	Design	Serial format	Notes
	Apportioned Power Unit	c. 1998	Green on white	PB 1234; SB 1234	Issued to trucks and tractor units.
	Apportioned Trailer	c. 1998	Green on white	RB 1234; TB 1234	Issued to semi-trailers.
	County Sheriff's Department		Green on white with Sheriff's star-shaped seal at left	S00-1234	Uses the numeric county-code system that was used on standard passenger plates until 1979 (so, for instance, a plate whose serial starts with S77 would indicate a deputy from Polk County). The numbers to the right of the hyphen correspond to the deputy's badge number. These plates are used only on marked units.
	Dealer		Black on white with blue state name	D1; D12; D123; D1234	Plus three-digit suffix that ascends for each dealer.
	Motorcycle		Similar to standard passenger base	1234 AB; AB 1234	
	Official		Black on white	1234567	
	Official County		Black on white	12345	
	Official School		Red on white	12345	
	Special		As standard passenger base, but with vertical "SPECIAL" at left	123 SBC (000 SAA to 999 SHG)	
	State Patrol	1975	Black on yellow with two red stars either side of serial	12; 123	The serial number corresponds to the badge number for that state trooper, excluding post 16, who drive pool cars assigned numbers which are currently not being used by another trooper. These plates are used only on marked units; unmarked units use regular state-issued plates.
	Trailer		As standard passenger base	1234 AB; AB 1234	

=== Optional plates ===
Iowa offers its motorists a number of optional issue designs that are available upon the payment of an additional fee.

Plates of all types other than the university types are available for both automobiles and motorcycles, the latter using a smaller overall plate size. University Plates are the only plates not colored the same as the standard issue plate, the color scheme is a yellow base, with the university's main sports team color on both the numbers, and a header denoting the school (i.e. red for Iowa State University, black for University of Iowa, purple for UNI, et cetera).

Image	Type	First issued	Serial format	Notes
	Air Force Cross			Must present military form DD-214 showing receipt of medal to be issued. Issuance is strictly regulated by the Iowa Department of Transportation, and the Iowa Department of Veterans' Affairs.
	Airman's Medal			Must present military form DD-214 showing receipt of medal to be issued. Plate issuance is strictly regulated by the Iowa Department of Transportation, and the Iowa Department of Veterans' Affairs.
	Blackout	July 2019	ABC 123	Combinations leapfrog through regular series. No I, O, Q used as 3rd letter. INS 427 lowest number reported.
	Breast Cancer Awareness		123BA	
	Bronze Star			Must present military form DD-214 showing receipt of medal to be issued. As with all plates denoting high issue military medals, the issuance of this plate is strictly regulated by the Iowa Department of Transportation, and the Iowa Department of Veterans' Affairs.
	Cattlemen Care		CA123; 123CA; 123CI	
	Congressional Medal of Honor—Air Force		Plate number is medal issuance number	plate is light blue on white, with the words "Medal of Honor" in place of county name. Plate is issued by the state Veterans Administration.
	Congressional Medal of Honor—Army		Plate number is medal issuance number	county name replaced with the words "Medal of Honor." Plate is light blue on white. Plate is issued by state Veterans Administration. Must provide Military form DD-214 showing receipt of medal, as well as a copy of the medal certificate. Medal of Honor plates issued for all branches of service are strictly regulated.
	Congressional Medal of Honor—Navy		Plate number is medal issuance number	county name replaced with the words "Medal of Honor." Plate is light blue on white. Plate is issued by state Veterans Administration
	Distinguished Service Cross		DSC123; DSC1234	Must present military form DD-214 showing receipt of medal to be issued
	Education			Must show NEA membership card and hold credentials as a schoolteacher to be issued.
	Emergency Medical Services		123EM; 123EN	You need your signature and your director's signature notarized proving that you are indeed a member of a paid or volunteer EMS service in Iowa
	Masons			Must provide membership in an area Freemasons Lodge to be issued this plate
	Ex-Prisoner of War		POW123; POW1234	Must present military form DD-214 showing receipt of the POW medal before issuance.
	Firefighter		FF123; 123FF; FD123; 123FD; 1234F; F1234	Must have Firefighter's Identification before issuance. Plate is red on white, with nationally recognized firefighter's insignia in far left side, and reads "Firefighter," in place of county name.
	God Bless America		US123; 123US; 123UA; 123UD; 123UE; 123UK; 123UP; 123UQ; 123UR; 123UT	
	Gold Star Mothers/Wives			Must have proof of membership within Gold Star Mother's, or Gold Star Wives in order to be issued this plate
	Iowa Heritage			
	Iowa State University		ISU1234	
	Legion of Merit			Must present military form DD-214 showing receipt of medal to be issued.
	Love Our Kids		K1234	
	Motorcycle Rider			
	National Guard		N1234	Must have Military Identification denoting member of National Guard in order to be issued this plate.
	Natural Resources – Bald eagle		AB 123	
	Natural Resources – Goldfinch/wild rose		AB123; AB 123	
	Natural Resources – Pheasant		AB 123	
	Navy and Marine Corps Medal			Must present military form DD-214 showing receipt of medal to be issued.
	Navy Cross		NC123; NC1234	Must present military form DD-214 showing receipt of medal to be issued.
	Organ and Tissue Donor Awareness		U1234; 1234U	Must provide proof as an organ, or tissue donor (usually found on drivers license), to be issued this plate
	Persons with Disabilities		C1234; 1234C; J1234; 1234J; Y1234; 1234Y; 1234Z, Z1234	Must have proof of disability, as well as the signature of a board certified doctor before plate is issued. Nobody can be issued this plate without the approval of the Iowa Department of Transportation. The plate is marked with the universal handicapped symbol on the far left hand side, with the serial number following, the one letter four number combination can either be with the letter first, or last in sequence.
	Purple Heart		P1234	Must present military form DD-214 showing receipt of medal to be issued
	Retired Air Force		R1234	Must present Military Identification Card denoting retirement to be issued.
	Retired Army		R1234	Must have military identification card denoting retirement to be issued
	Retired Coast Guard		R1234	Must present Coast Guard identification card showing retirement to be issued
	Retired Marines		R1234	Must have military identification card denoting retirement to be issued
	Retired Navy		R1234	Must have military identification card denoting retirement to be issued
	Share the Road		SR123 (passenger); 123SU (motorcycle)	
	Shriners		ZA123; ZB123	Must present a Shriners membership card to be issued
	Silver Star			Must present military form DD-214 showing receipt of medal to be issued
	Soldier's Medal			Must present military form DD-214 showing receipt of medal to be issued
	University of Iowa		UI 1234	
	University of Northern Iowa		UNI1234	
	Veteran		V1234	Plate appears as standard plate, with an American flag to the far left, with the word "Veteran" above, plate is issued by the state Veteran's Administration, all applying must have copy of Military form DD-214 denoting Honorable Discharge in order to receive the Veterans plate.
	Police Department		1234567	Plate is white on dark blue, with a police officer's badge from the corresponding city on the left side, along with a seven digit number, and at the bottom, the City Police Department of issuance. These are issued only by the local police departments within the state, and placed on marked units only upon receipt of vehicle. They are illegal to be displayed by non-police officers.

== Previous non-passenger and optional plates ==
=== Optional plates ===
Image	Type	First issued	Design	Slogan	Serial format	Serials issued	Notes
	Pearl Harbor Survivor	1979?	Same as passenger baseplate, but with Pearl Harbor Survivor logo, used until 2011 or when the last Pearl Harbor Survivor from Iowa died	"Pearl Harbor Veteran" county name	ship's hull number	ship's hull number	Must have proof to be issued this plate. Proof would consist of Military form DD-214, denoting that applicant was stationed on any one of the eight Battleships moored at Pearl Harbor Dec. 7, 1941, or any smaller vessel that was documented to be at Pearl Harbor during the attack. In place of county name, the plate reads "Pearl Harbor Veteran" before 1997, when the slogan became the county name sticker. Can have ship's hull number placed as plate number for no extra charge, provided the sequence is not already taken by another motorist.
	Antique	1975?	Same as passenger baseplate	"ANTIQUE"			This plate was discontinued on at most 1997.
	Truck	1966	Embossed dark blue lettering on a white background, "IOWA" in center at top "TRK" in center at bottom				

=== Sesquicentennial plates ===
Image	Type	First issued	Design	Serial format	Serials issued	Notes
	Sesquicentennial (Patriotic)	1992	Embossed red serial on reflective white plate; "IOWA" screened in blue centered at top, with blue state shape to right; "Sesquicentennial" screened in red centered at bottom; blue bands screened at top left and top right, with "1846-1996" on left band and "92" on right band	S123456	S000001 to approximately S125000	Both these plates commemorated Iowa's 150 years of statehood. They remained valid until 1997.
	Sesquicentennial (Scenic)	1992	Embossed red serial on reflective graphic plate with pale blue sky, green grass, pale green tree and blue city skyline; "IOWA" screened in red at top, offset to right; "SESQUICENTENNIAL 1846 * 1996" (in two lines) screened in black to left; "92" screened at top right	123456S	000001S to approximately 130000S	Both these plates commemorated Iowa's 150 years of statehood. They remained valid until 1997.
