= Nera =

Nera may refer to:

== People ==
- Nera Corsi (1444–1507), Italian noblewoman
- Nera Simi (1890–1987), Italian artist
- Nera Stipičević (born 1983), Croatian actress
- Nera Tiebwa (born 2008), i-Kiribati judoka
- Nera White (1935–2016), American basketball player
- Nera (footballer) (born 1988), Portuguese footballer born André António Ribeiro Novais

== Places ==
- Nera Plateau, Russian Far East
- Nera Gorge-Beușnița National Park, Romania
- Nera (islet), a small islet in the Aegean Sea, close to the island of Kalymnos, Dodecanese, Greece.

== Rivers ==
- Néra River, a river of New Caledonia
- Nera (Danube), a tributary of the Danube, flowing through Romania and Serbia
- Nera (Tiber), a tributary of the Tiber in Italy
- Nera (Indigirka), a tributary of the Indigirka in Russia

== Other uses ==
- Nera (company), a Norwegian manufacturer of high capacity wireless point-to-point and point-to-multipoint telecommunication products
- Nera (mythology), a character from Irish mythology
- National Economic Research Associates, an American economic consultancy
- Naval Enlisted Reserve Association, a military advocacy group located in Falls Church, Virginia, USA
- Non-explosive reactive armor (NERA), types of tank armour
- Hesperocharis nera, a butterfly of the family Pieridae
- Quarter note, note value with black head

== See also ==
- Ust-Nera
- Nerra (disambiguation)
- Nero (disambiguation)
- New England Antiquities Research Association (NEARA)
