= Service lapel button =

Service lapel button may refer to:

- Honorable Service Lapel Button, awarded to U.S. military service members who were discharged under honorable conditions during World War II
- Gold Star Lapel Button, issued to the direct next of kin family members of service members who died in World War I and World War II and other hostilities in which the Armed Forces has been engaged
- Any service lapel button authorized under Title 36 of the United States Code, Subtitle I—Patriotic and National Observances and Ceremonies, Chapter 9, § 901

== See also ==
- Service flag
