= Jeanette Lawrence =

American writer (1869–1960)

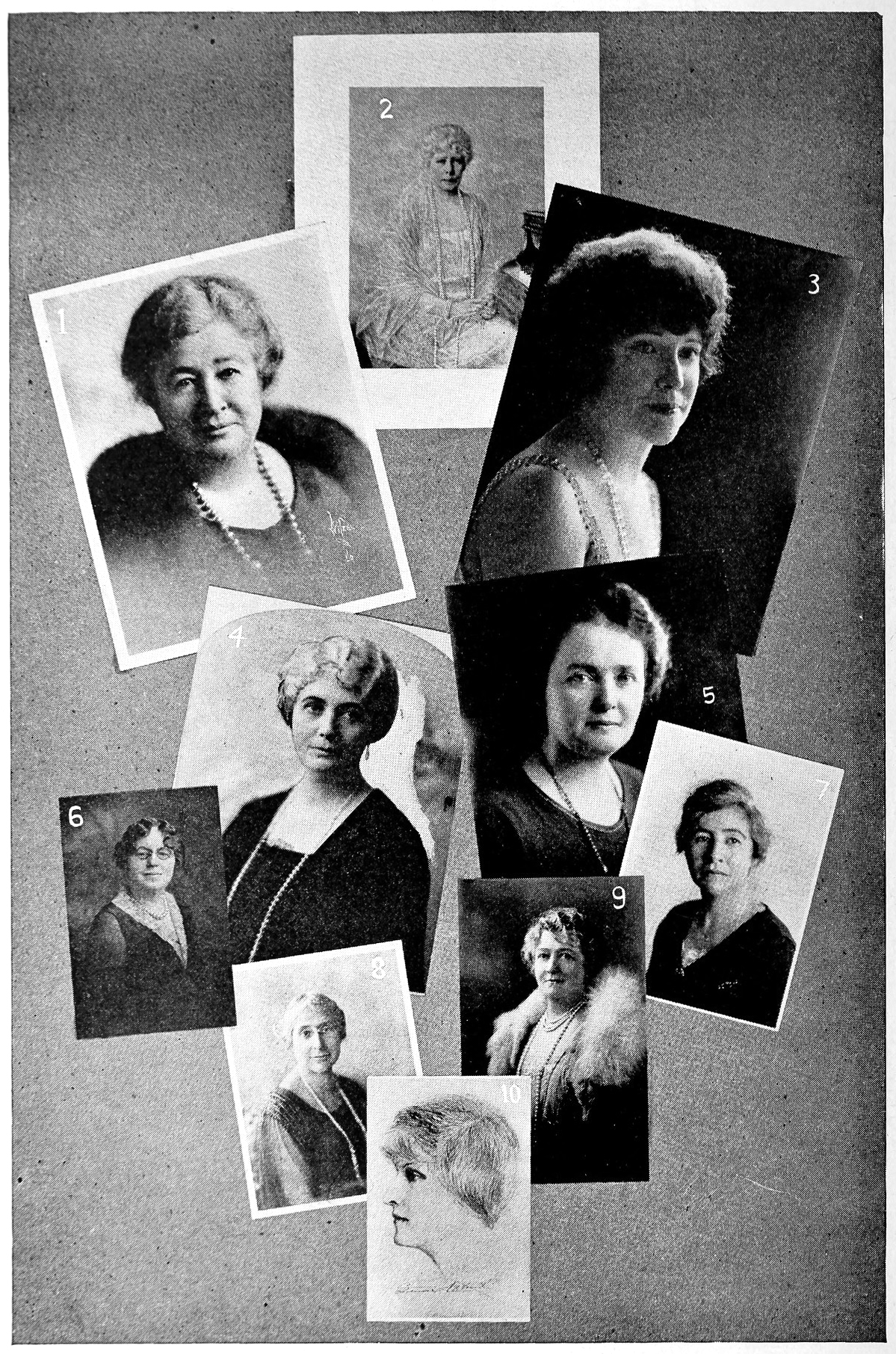
A Few of the Eminent Women of California, Mariana Bertola, Carrie Jacobs-Bond, May Showler Groves, Minna McGauley, Maud Wilde, Jeanette Lawrence, Miriam Van Waters, Mrs. David Starr Jordan, Annie Florence Brown, Gertrude Atherton

Jeanette Carolyn Heintzen Lawrence (May 3, 1869 – July 6, 1960) was an American writer and lecturer.

== Biography ==
Jeanette Carolyn Heintzen was born on May 3, 1869 in Sierra County, California, the daughter of Charles Heintzen, Jr and Sarah V. Busch. Her father was the first banker north of Sacramento in the 1850s. From both her father's and her mother's sides she was descended from California pioneers: Charles Heintzen, Sr. drove the stagecoach for Wells Fargo, sometimes hiding the gold from the North Yuba River mines in butter churns on their way to San Francisco, via Marysville; August Busch partnered with Herringlake in establishing the Wells Fargo building in Sierra City.

She moved to Sacramento in 1910 and lived at 918 Mission Way, Sacramento, California. She first married Carey and later married Richard Kay Lawrence (1881–1953) and had two children: Charles Josef Carey (from the first husband) and Richard Jay Lawrence (1907–1994) (from the second husband).

She was a writer and speaker; she was the organizer, and for two years president of the Sacramento Branch of the League of American Penwomen; she was president of the P.E.O. Sisterhood; she was president of the Tuesday Club; she was State Chairman of Literature of the California Federation of Women's Clubs.

She had poems published in newspapers and magazines; a poem to California's Sacred Sons decorated by artist Louise Tessin, was presented to Sacramento Memorial Auditorium and then hung in the Memorial Hall of the building.

She was the author of: My Service Flag, The Unknown Soldier, American, Wings of Triumph, The American Comet, Pine Songs of the Sierras and other poems.

She was very active in women's club work, and was well-known dramatic reader and lecturer.

She was a member of: Penwomen, California, Writers Club, Woman's Forum, Tuesday Club, Daughters of the Nile, Order of the Eastern Star, L. W. Charity Club, American War Mothers.

Jeanette Lawrence died on July 6, 1960, and is buried at East Lawn Memorial Park, Sacramento.
