= Nerra =

Nerra may refer to:

- Nerra (Dungeons & Dragons), a fictional monster in the role-playing game
- Fulk Nerra, mediaeval noble
- Robert Nerra, fictional character in the 1987 film Lionheart
- Ramona Nerra, Romanian singer

== See also ==
- Nera (disambiguation)
