= Nera (mythology) =

Irish mythical character

Nera (modern spelling Neara) is a warrior of Connacht in the Ulster Cycle of Irish mythology who appears in the 10th-century Middle Irish story the Echtra Nerai (English: The Adventure of Nera)

== Legend ==
One Samhain night when the court of Aillil and Medb were feasting at Cruachan, King Aillil offered a prize to any man who was brave enough to put a wicker band around the ankle of a corpse that had been hanged. Because Samhain was considered to be a night when the dead have power, only Nera was courageous enough to volunteer. After two failed attempts, one of the corpses speaks, advising him to use a peg. When he placed the wicker band around the corpse's ankle, it asked him for water. Nera allowed it to climb on his back and he carried it to a house, but flames sprang up around the house when they approached. They tried a second house, which was then surrounded by water. On their third attempt, they were able to enter the house, and the corpse drank three cups of water, spitting the last out on the householders and killing them.

Nera returned the corpse to the gallows, but when he returned to court the hall was on fire and all of the inhabitants had been decapitated. He thought he saw an army going into the Cave of Cruachan (also known as Ireland's Gate to Hell), so he followed them. Inside the hill, he met a woman of the sidhe who told him that the destruction that he had seen was only a vision of what would happen on the next Samhain night unless the warriors of Medb and Aillil destroyed the Hill of Cruachan and defeated the sidhe army.

Nera returned to tell Medb and Aillil what he had heard and found that no time had passed since he had left the hall to put the wicker band around the corpse's foot. Nera warned the people of Cruachan of the danger and then escaped with the woman of the sidhe before Medb and Aillil called on Fergus mac Roich to destroy the Hill of Cruachan.

In some versions of the legend, Nera spends a whole year in the hill, taking a wife and fathering a child in that time, and convinces Medb and Aillil of the truth of his story by bringing them summer flowers, specifically garlic, primrose, and golden fern. Aillil rewards him with a sword.

Afterwards, the warriors of Cruachan and Ulster conquer the sidhe. He finds three treasures within the sidhe: the mantle of Lóegaire mac Néill, the crown of Brión mac Echach Muigmedóin, and either the shirt or the face-plate of Dúnlaing mac Énnai.

== See also ==
- Nera (disambiguation)

== Sources ==
- Samhain Myths
- Cruachan
