= Hungarian Reformed Federation of America =

The Hungarian Reformed Federation of America (HRFA) was a fraternal organization chartered by congress in 1907. Prior to 2011, the HRFA main office was located in the Kossuth House located at 2001 Massachusetts Avenue in Washington, D.C. In that year, the company merged with GBU Life (GBU), headquartered in Pittsburgh, PA and continues as District 3000 of GBU. Prior to the merger with GBU, HRFA published the Fraternity/Testveriseg periodical once quarterly.

== History ==
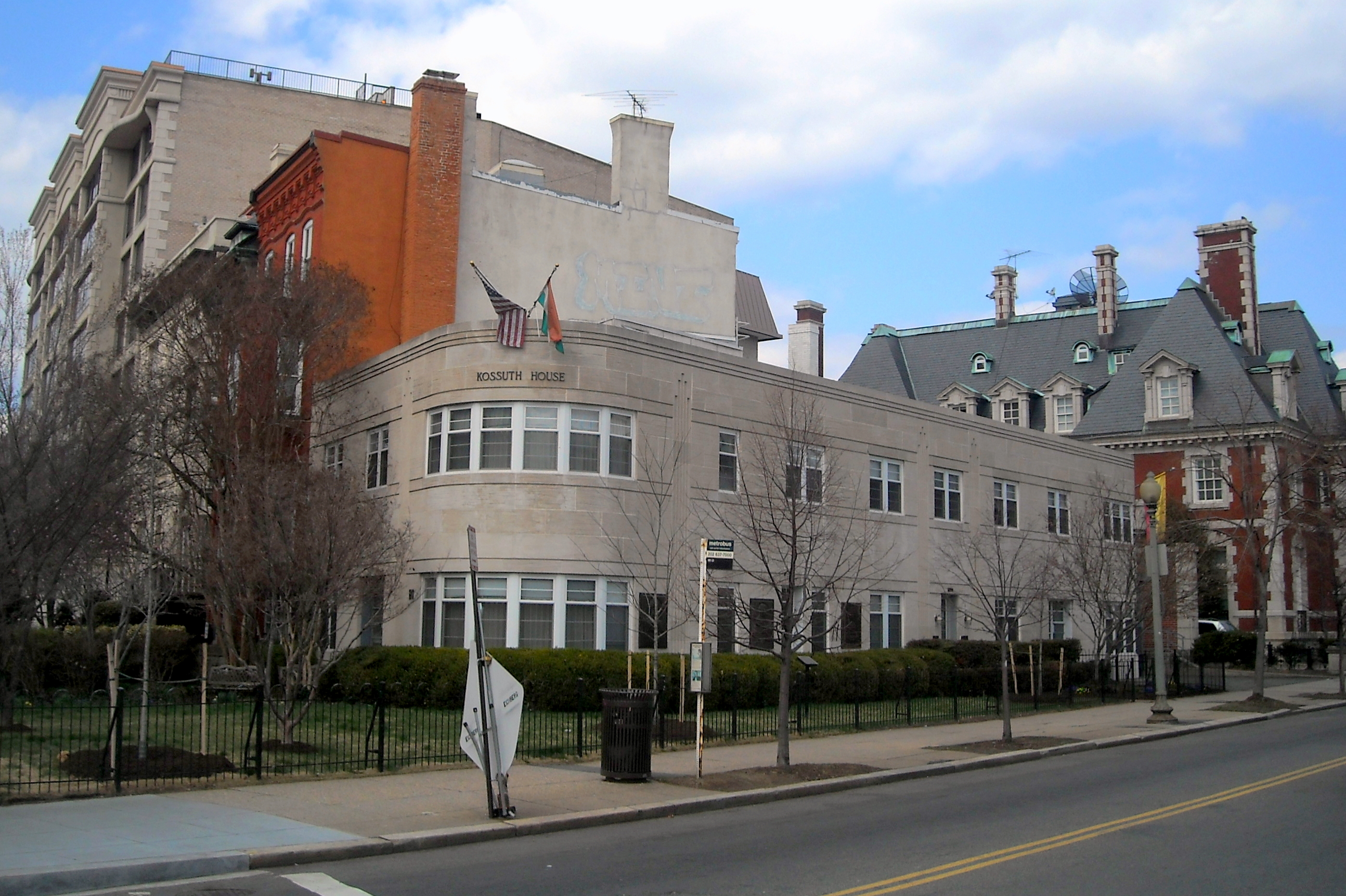
The Kossuth House located in the Dupont Circle neighborhood of Washington, D.C.

The HRFA was founded at Trenton, New Jersey on July 5, 1896. The need was to build relationships between scattered groups of Hungarian immigrants and create congregational centers. There was also a need to support the financial needs of the members in times of death or disaster. The goal of the federation as defined by Rev. Sandor Kalassay were and are:

"The aim of the Federation, besides giving material and moral support to the Hungarian Calvinist mission in America, is to pay a death benefit and funeral expenses to the heirs of the members. The Federation will begin to function when it reaches a membership of 500. Any Hungarian who will pay the $1 initiation fee and the annual fee of $1 may become a member. Having reached a membership of 500, the Federation will pay a $250 death benefit and $50 for funeral expenses. The amounts will be collected from the members through proportional assessments."

By 1898 the federation had grown to 936 members and in 1907 it received a charter from Congress. The federation asked for and received a national charter to allow it to be a national organization, with branches in every state founded on charity rather than business.

== Membership ==
Membership was open. The organization had 37,235 members in 1965, 28,00 in 1979 and 18,433 in 1994.

== Benefits ==
In the 1979 the society sold insurance in about twelve states, the District of Columbia and Canada. It sponsors study contest student aid and loans; convention every 4 years and ran a home for the aged in Ligonier, Pennsylvania. Apparently cites the groups periodical
