= The Silver Star Families of America =

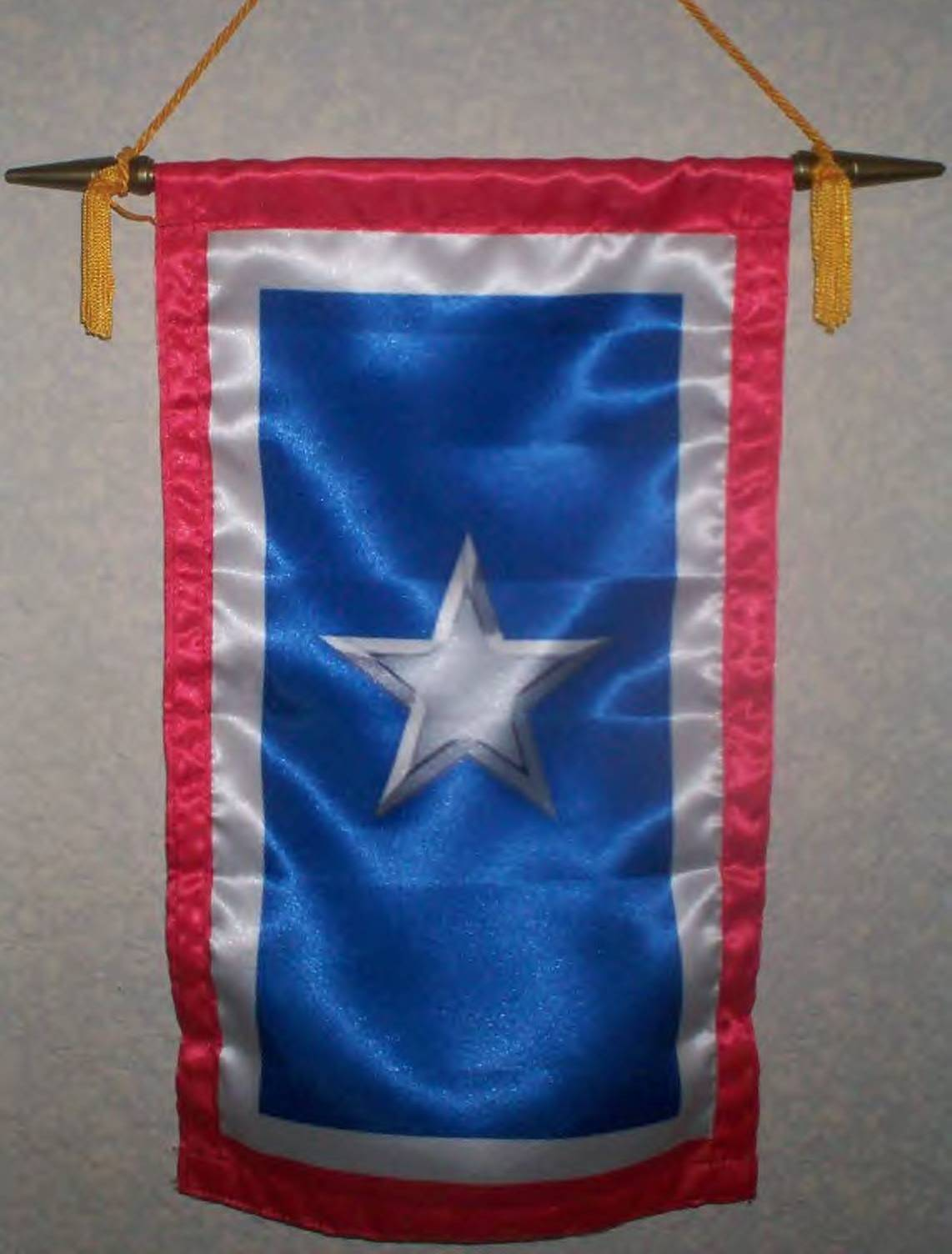
Actual Silver Star Service Banner

The Silver Star Families of America (SSFOA) is a 501(c) tax exempt organization dedicated to honoring and supporting wounded, ill and injured veterans of all branches of the armed forces of the United States of America. The organization was founded in 2004 by Steve and Diana Newton with the assistance of Joseph and Sharon Newton and the entire Newton family. It is not related to the military decoration designated the Silver Star.

== Historical background ==
The tradition of a service banner with a blue star covered with silver threads to represent wounded service personnel began in 1917 or 1918 following the suggestion of Women's Committee of the Council of National Defenses, but faded from use sometime between World War I and World War II. When the use of Blue and Gold Star Service Banners was formally adopted into the United States Code and made official, the tradition of the Silver Star Banner was overlooked.

The Department of Defense, given the authority to govern the use of the service banners, concluded that existing Blue Star Service Banner or Gold Star Service Banners and Flags could not be altered. A new Silver Star Service Flag and Banner were designed and were quickly accepted widely used throughout the United States.

The Silver Star Service Flag/Banner are trademarked. The name "Silver Star Service Banner" is TM.

The actual Silver Star Service Banner is 8.5" x 14."

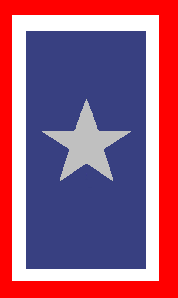
The Silver Star Service Banner

Footnote to service banner history: there is also a "War Mothers" Flag that was first flown over the capitol on Veterans Day in 1926. This Flag is still flown every year on Veterans Day starting at 11 minutes after 11 o'clock to sundown.

== Usage ==
The Silver Star Service Flag and Banner are symbols to remind Americans of the sacrifice made for them by so many.

The Silver Star Service Banner is reserved for those who have been wounded, contracted a serious illness or injury in a war zone.

The Silver Star Service Flag may be flown by anyone as a symbols of remembrance and honor.

It may be flown during war or peacetime.

If flown with the United States Flag, the Silver Star Service Flag must be lower and/or of a smaller size than the United States Flag.

Disposal methods are the same as those of the United States Flag.

Qualifications for receiving the Silver Star Service Banner are located here:

Note: The grommets from a properly disposed of Flag can be cleaned and given as recognition for service.

== Silver Star Service Banner Day ==
It was also believed that there should be a day set aside to remember the sacrifices of the wounded and ill: So the SSFOA petitioned the states to make May 1 Silver Star Service Banner Day.

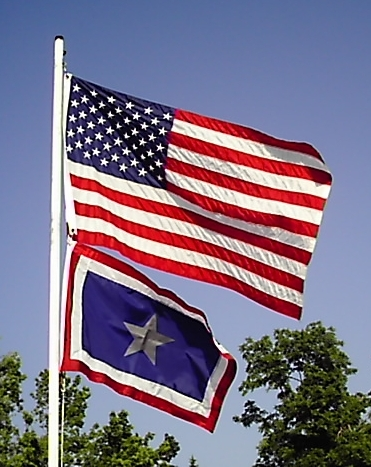
The United States Flag and the Silver Star Service Flag

To date, 50 states, Guam, Saipan, the U.S. Virgin Islands, the Chickasaw Nation and the District of Columbia has issued proclamations recognizing the Silver Star Families of America and Silver Star Service Banner Day. Over 2,900 cities and counties have also signed on.

The State of Missouri has made the day into law.

Silver Star Service Banner Day is now in the United States Congress.

On April 21, 2010, the United States House of Representatives passed H Res. 855, a stand-alone resolution, making the SSFOA Silver Star Service Banner official and making May 1 Silver Star Service Banner Day.

"Resolved, That the House of Representatives supports the designation of 'Silver Star Service Banner Day' and calls upon the people of the United States to observe the day with appropriate programs, ceremonies, and activities.".

On May 19, 2010, the United States Senate followed suit and approved Senate Resolution 534 and it was sent to the President of the United States.

"Resolved, That the Senate designates May 1, 2010, as 'Silver Star Service Banner Day' and calls upon the people of the United States to observe the day with appropriate programs, ceremonies, and activities."

On April 29, 2011, the President of the United States Barack Obama issued this statement: "When our men and women in uniform return from deployment, it is our moral obligation and great honor to serve them as well as they served us. Our debt of gratitude extends to their families and friends, who embody the same qualities of bravery, sacrifice and duty exhibited by their loved ones. On Silver Star Service Banner Day, we recommit to caring for those who return to us wounded or ill, and we remain humbled by the heroic contributions they have made to our Nation."

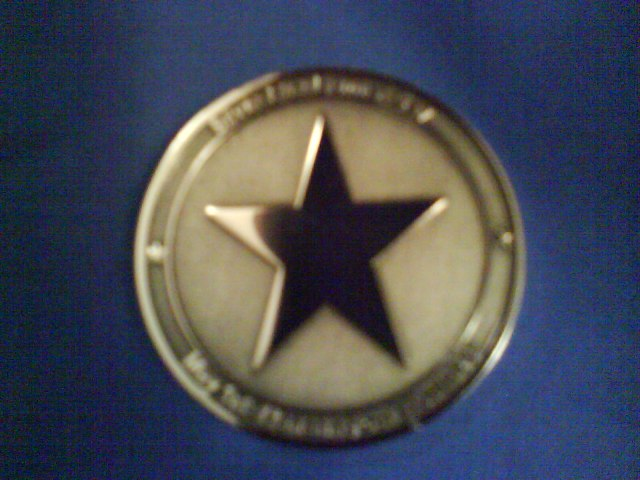
Silver Star Challenge Coin

Like many organizations, the Silver Star Families of America has a Challenge Coin.
