= Gold Star Fathers Act of 2014 =

- Long title: To amend chapter 21 of title 5, United States Code, to provide that fathers of certain permanently disabled or deceased veterans shall be included with mothers of such veterans as preference eligibles for treatment in the civil service.
- Announced in: the 113th United States Congress
- Sponsored by: Sen. Sherrod Brown (D, OH)
- Number of co-sponsors: 1

Codification
- U.S.C. sections affected: 5 U.S.C. § 2108

Legislative history
- Introduced in the Senate as S. 2323 by Sen. Sherrod Brown (D, OH) on May 13, 2014; Committee consideration by United States Senate Committee on Homeland Security and Governmental Affairs; Passed the Senate on September 10, 2014 (unanimous consent)

The Gold Star Fathers Act of 2014 (S. 2323) was a bill that would have expanded preferred eligibility for federal jobs to the fathers of certain permanently disabled or deceased veterans. The mothers of such veterans already had federal hiring preference.

The bill was introduced into the United States Senate during the 113th United States Congress.

== Background ==
When the bill was introduced, Gold Star mothers and unmarried widows and widowers had a hiring preference of ten points.

== Provisions of the bill ==
This summary is based largely on the summary provided by the Congressional Research Service, a public domain source.

The Gold Star Fathers Act of 2014 would include as a preference eligible for federal employment purposes a parent (currently, the mother only) of either an individual who lost their life under honorable conditions while serving in the Armed Forces during a war, in a campaign or expedition for which a campaign badge has been authorized, or during the period beginning April 28, 1952, and ending July 1, 1955, or a service-connected permanently and totally disabled veteran, if: (1) the spouse of such parent is totally and permanently disabled; or (2) such parent, when preference is claimed, is unmarried or legally separated from his or her spouse.

== Congressional Budget Office report ==
This summary is based largely on the summary provided by the Congressional Budget Office, as ordered reported by the Senate Committee on Homeland Security and Governmental Affairs on July 30, 2014. This is a public domain source.

S. 2323 would expand preferred eligibility for federal jobs to the fathers of certain permanently disabled or deceased veterans. The Congressional Budget Office (CBO) estimates that implementing the legislation would not have any significant effect on the federal budget. Enacting the bill would not affect direct spending or revenues; therefore, pay-as-you-go procedures do not apply.

Under current law, mothers of certain veterans are eligible to claim preferences for civil service positions if their children are permanently disabled or deceased. S. 2323 would expand that preference to include such veterans’ fathers. We estimate that the legislation would have no significant budgetary effect because, while it would expand the pool of people eligible for federal job preferences, it would not change the total number of federal jobs available or the salaries paid to federal employees.

S. 2323 contains no intergovernmental or private-sector mandates as defined in the Unfunded Mandates Reform Act and would not affect the budgets of state, local, or tribal governments.

== Procedural history ==
The Gold Star Fathers Act of 2014 was introduced into the United States Senate on May 13, 2014, by Sen. Sherrod Brown (D, OH). The bill was referred to the United States Senate Committee on Homeland Security and Governmental Affairs. On September 10, 2014, the Senate voted with unanimous consent to pass the bill.

== Debate and discussion ==
Senator Brown, who introduced the bill, said that "when a service member is killed in action or permanently and totally disabled, the government should do its part to be there for grieving parents - no matter if they're fathers or mothers."

Scott Warner, an activist for Gold Star fathers, said that he hoped the bill "will bring more awareness to what's going on in surviving families." Hearing Warner's story about losing his son in Iraq is what inspired Senator Brown to write the bill.

== See also ==
- List of bills in the 113th United States Congress
- Service flag
