= Nera (footballer) =

Portuguese footballer

Personal information
- Full name: André António Ribeiro Novais
- Date of birth: 9 July 1988 (age 38)
- Place of birth: Guimarães, Portugal
- Height: 1.85 m (6 ft 1 in)
- Position: Defender

Youth career
- 2004–2005: Vitória de Guimarães
- 2005–2007: Vizela

Senior career*
Years	Team	Apps	(Gls)
2007–2010	Serdezelo		
2010–2013	Limianos		
2013	FC Felgueiras 1932	9	(1)
2014–2015	Tirsense	37	(1)
2015	Limianos	16	(3)
2016	Bragança	13	(2)
2016–2017	Famalicão	9	(0)
2017–2018	Vizela	12	(0)
- * Club domestic league appearances and goals as of 16:26, 26 January 2021 (UTC)

André António Ribeiro Novais, known as Nera (born 9 July 1988) is a Portuguese football player who plays as a defender.

== Club career ==
He made his professional debut in the Segunda Liga for Famalicão on 23 November 2016 in a game against Benfica B.
