= American Gold Star Mothers =

U.S. nonprofit organization

American Gold Star Mothers, Inc.

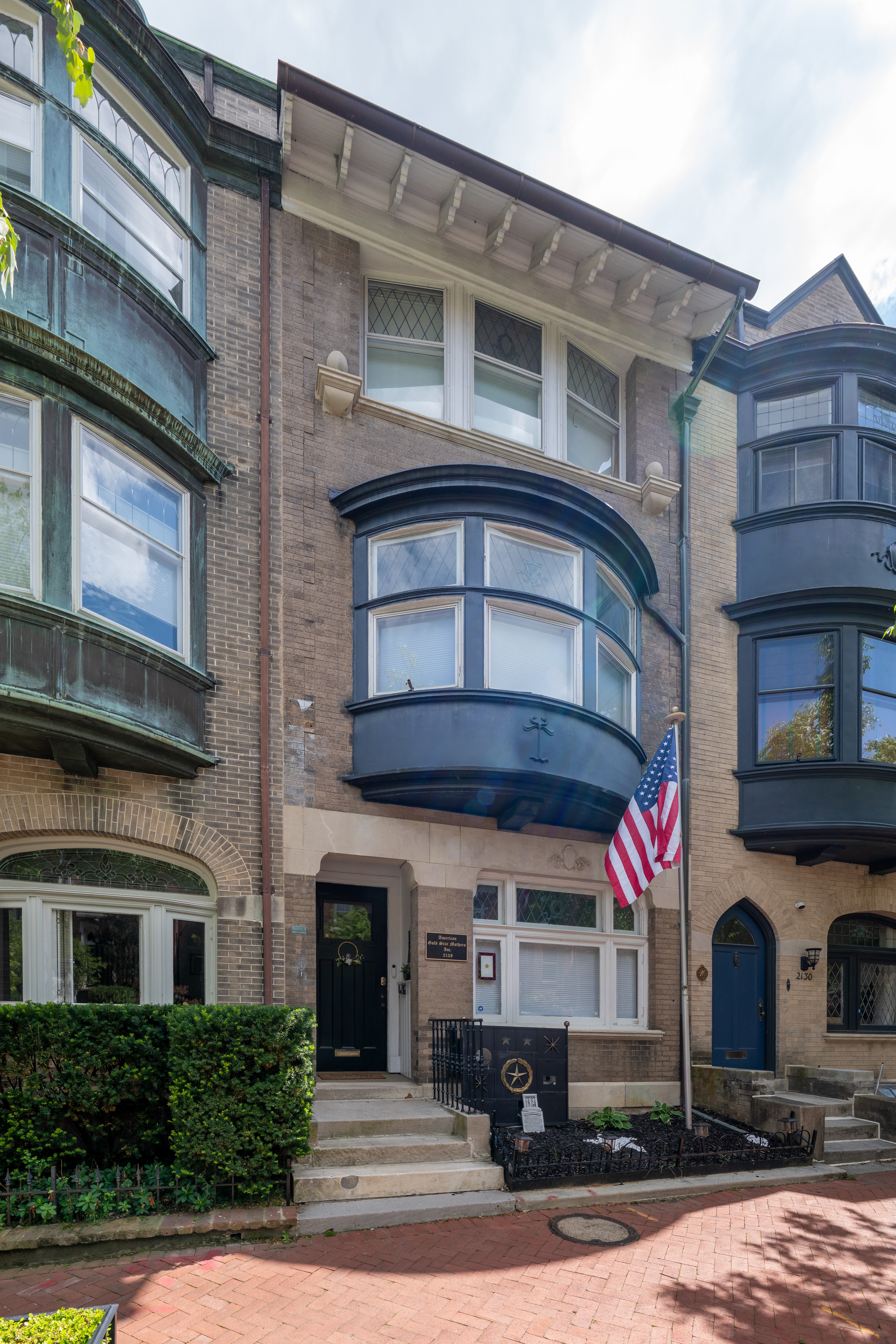
- Headquarters in Washington D.C.
- Type: 501(c)(3), charitable organization
- Tax ID no.: EIN 526045308
- Location: 2128 Leroy Place NW, Washington, D.C. 20008
- Website: americangoldstarmothers.org

A Service flag with one gold star

American Gold Star Mothers, Inc. (AGSM), is a private nonprofit organization of American mothers who lost sons or daughters in service of the United States Armed Forces. It was originally formed in 1928 for mothers of those lost in World War I, and it holds a congressional charter under Title 36 § 211 of the United States Code. Its name came from the custom of families of servicemen hanging a banner called a service flag in the windows of their homes. The service flag had a star for each family member in the Armed Forces. Living servicemen were represented by a blue star, and those who had lost their lives in combat were represented by a gold star.

Membership in the organization is open to any woman who is a U.S. citizen or legal resident that has lost a son or daughter in active service in the U.S. military (regardless of the place or time of the military service, regardless of whether the circumstances of death involved hostile conflict or not, and including mothers of those missing in action).

== Founding ==
The Gold Star Mothers was founded by Grace Darling Seibold of Washington, D.C.

When the United States entered World War I in 1917, George Vaughn Seibold, 23, volunteered, requesting assignment in aviation. He was sent to Canada where he learned to fly British planes since the United States had neither an air force nor planes. Deployed to England, he was assigned to the British Royal Flying Corps with 148th Aero Squadron. With his squadron, he left for combat duty in France. He corresponded with his family regularly. His mother, Grace Darling Seibold, began to do community service by visiting returning servicemen in the hospitals. When mail from George stopped Grace assumed the worst and wrote the Army for assistance finding her son. Since all aviators were under British control and authority, the United States could not help the Seibold family with any information about their son.

Grace continued to visit hospitalized veterans in the Washington area, clinging to the hope that her son might have been injured and returned to the United States without any identification. While working through her sorrow, she helped ease the pain of the many servicemen who returned so war-damaged that they were incapable of ever reaching normalcy.

But on October 11, 1918, George's wife in Chicago received a box marked "Effects of deceased Officer 1st Lt. George Vaughn Seibold". The Seibolds also received a confirmation of George's death on November 4 through a family member in Paris. George's body was never identified.

Grace, convinced that self-contained grief is self-destructive, devoted her time and efforts not only to working in the hospital but also to supporting other mothers whose sons had lost their lives in military service. She organized a group consisting solely of these mothers, with the purpose of not only comforting each other, but giving loving care to hospitalized veterans confined in government hospitals far from home. The organization was named after the Gold Star that families hung in their windows in honor of the deceased veteran. After years of planning, twenty-five mothers met in Washington, D.C., on June 4, 1928, to establish the national organization, American Gold Star Mothers, Inc.

== Origin of Gold Star Symbol ==
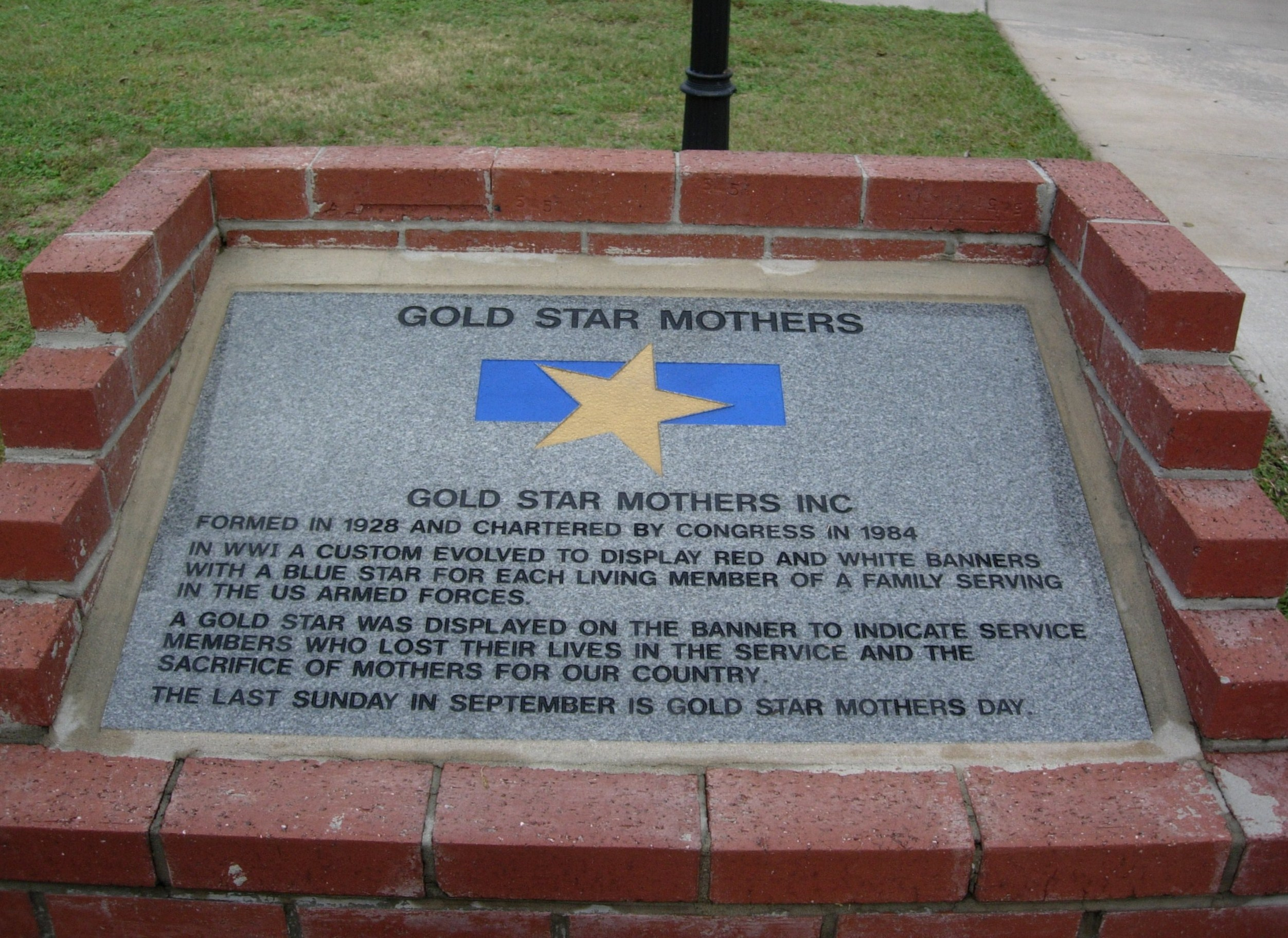
A monument at the Ocala, Florida memorial park that mentions the organization

On May 28, 1918, President Woodrow Wilson approved a suggestion made by the Council of National Defense that, instead of wearing conventional mourning for relatives who have died in the service of their country, American women should wear a black band on the left arm with a gilt star on the band for each member of the family who has given his life for the nation.

"The Service Flag displayed from homes, places of business, churches, schools, etc., to indicate the number of members of the family or organizations who are serving in the Armed Forces or who have died from such service. Service flags have a deep Blue Star for each living member in the service and a Gold Star for each member who has died." Thus, the Gold Star and the term Gold Star Mother, as applied to mothers whose sons or daughters died in World War I, were accepted; they have continued to be used in reference to all American military engagements since that time.

== Pilgrimages ==
The United States also assisted its citizens who were Gold Star Mothers to visit the overseas graves of their sons, as well as for widows of the fallen. In 1929 the program was expanded to include non-U.S. citizens. It ended in 1933. Named medals were also presented to those who made a pilgrimage.

== History of membership criteria ==
Membership in American Gold Star Mothers was originally restricted to those who lost sons or daughters in World War I, and was later expanded to include mothers of those lost in World War II, then the Korean War, and then other specific conflicts. Today, the membership criteria do not consider the place or time of the military service and do not consider whether the circumstances of the death involved hostile conflict or not, and also allow membership for mothers of those missing in action.

For the first 77 years of its existence, AGSM restricted its membership criteria to admit only U.S. citizens. As a way to create pressure to change the rule, an application for admission was submitted in 2005 that deliberately highlighted the applicant's lack of citizenship. The application, from Ligaya Lagman, a Filipino permanent resident of the United States living in Yonkers, New York, who had been living in the U.S. more than 20 years and whose son, Marine Staff Sgt. Anthony Lagman, was killed in action in Afghanistan in 2004 at the age of 26, was rejected in May 2005. In the next month after that incident, which received a "firestorm" of publicity that included negative commentary by New York U.S. Representative Eliot Engel and New York U.S. Senator Hillary Rodham Clinton, the group agreed on June 27, 2005, to change its membership criteria, and it accepted its first two non-citizens as members a few months later in early September 2005.

== Current membership and charter ==
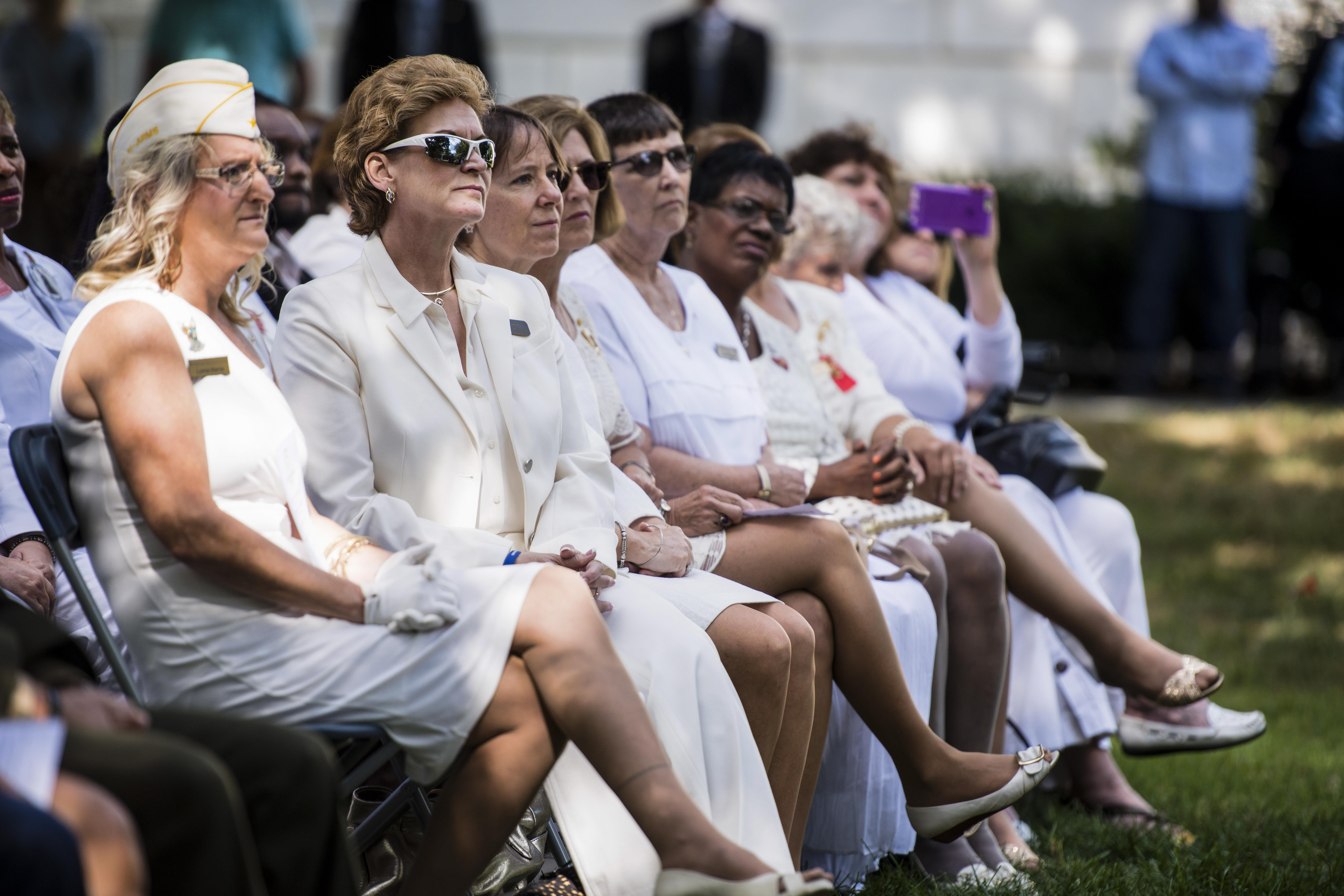
Gold Star Mothers listen as Army Chief of Staff Gen. Mark A. Milley (not pictured) offers remarks during the 80th Gold Star Mother's Day commemorative ceremony at Arlington National Cemetery in Arlington, Va., September 25, 2016.

The AGSM is a private 501(c)(3) nonprofit organization that sets its own rules for who is allowed to become a member. The current charter, held under Title 36 § 211 of the United States Code, was established on June 12, 1984.

Today, membership in American Gold Star Mothers is open to any woman who was a U.S. citizen or legal resident of the U.S. or its Territories or Insular Possessions at the time their child (or adopted child) was inducted into military service and whose child (or adopted child) has died or has become missing in action while in the United States Armed Forces (or died later as the result of such service). Membership is not contingent on whether the child was killed in action or on the theater of operation or the time period of the service (which differs from distinctions made by the Department of Defense, which confers special status to service in particular periods of time and particular hostile operations). Non-adoptive stepmothers are also eligible for membership if they assumed responsibility for the child before the age of fifteen and raised them. Husbands and children of Gold Star Mothers are eligible to join as Associate Members. Honorary membership is available to mothers who were not citizens or legal residents at the time their child was inducted. Associate Members and Honorary Members cannot vote or hold official positions (and are not required to pay dues).

AGSM is made up of local chapters, which are organized into departments. Five members are required to start a local chapter. If no local chapter is available, a woman may join the organization as a member at large.

Just as when it was founded, AGSM continues to concentrate on providing emotional support to its members, doing volunteer work with veterans in general and veterans' hospitals in particular, and generally fostering a sense of patriotism and respect for members of the Armed Forces. The AGSM works together with Wreaths Across America fundraising for veteran’s graves as well as Vietnam War 50th anniversary recognition and provides financial-assistance grants for members who are facing hardships or natural disasters.

The group currently has 933 members.

== Uniform ==
The uniform consists of a white skirt, white shirt, and a white blazer, with a gold star embroidered on either lapel, and gold piping on the sleeve cuffs, and collars, and white shoes, either Mary Janes or pumps, with a white cap, similar to a women's service hat, with gold piping. This uniform is worn at all parades, meetings, and social functions connected with military functions (e.g., Memorial Day services at Arlington National Cemetery)

== Notable memberships ==
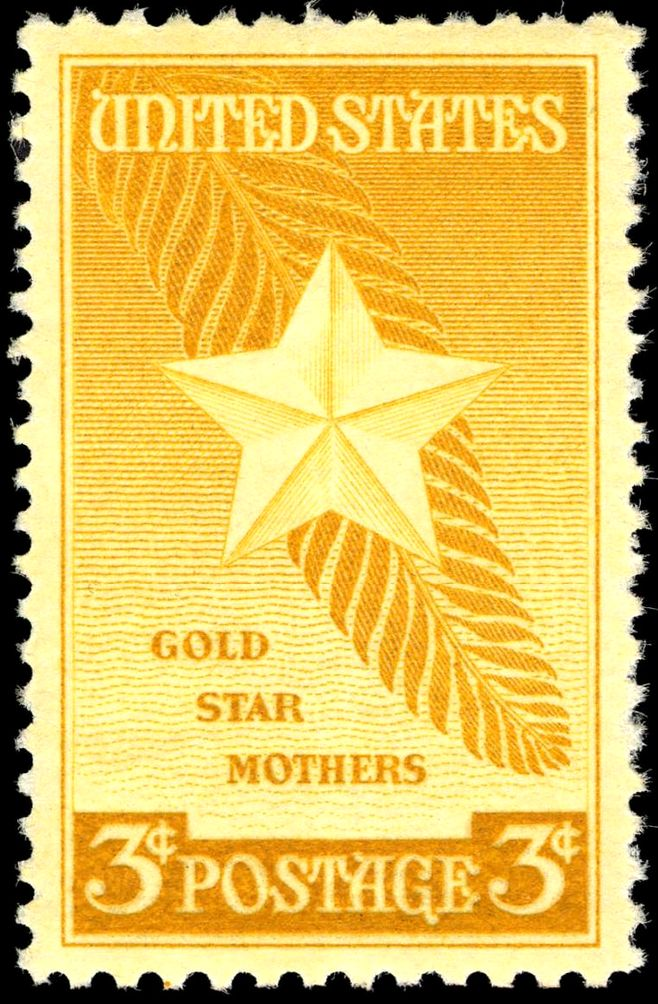
Gold Star Mothers commemorative issue of 1948

Aside from the founder, perhaps the mother most known for being a Gold Star mother was Aletta Sullivan, the mother of the five Sullivan brothers, who were killed in action when their ship, the USS Juneau (CL-52) was sunk by an enemy torpedo on November 13, 1942, during the Naval Battle of Guadalcanal. On September 21, 1948, the U.S. Post Office issued a commemorative stamp, specially designed by artist Charles R. Chickering, honoring the Gold Star Mothers. Aletta Sullivan was given the first sheet of stamps issued.

== Gold Star Mother's Day ==
On the last Sunday in September, Gold Star Mother's Day is observed in the U.S. in honor of Gold Star mothers, as established in Title 36 § 111 of the United States Code. This was originally declared by Senate Joint Resolution 115 of June 23, 1936. In September 2012, Barack Obama issued a presidential proclamation commemorating September 30, 2012, as "Gold Star Mother's and Family's Day". On September 23, 2017, President Donald Trump proclaimed Gold Star Mother's and Family's Day.

== American Gold Star Manor ==
American Gold Star Manor, located in Long Beach, California, is a 348-unit retirement home for parents of soldiers killed while serving in the military. It was founded in the early 1960s by Eleanor Boyd, then president of the American Gold Star Mothers organization.

== Finances ==
In 2025, the AGSM reported revenues of $309,255 and total assets amounted to $580,313. The revenue was 9.3% from program services, 0.2% from investment income and 89.9% from contributions. Charity Navigatior rated the AGSM as a 85% "Three-Star Charity".

== See also ==
- American War Mothers
- Blue Star Mothers of America
- Gold Star Lapel Button
- Gold Star Wives of America
- The Silver Star Families of America
- List of women's organizations
