= Gold Star Wives of America =

American organization

- Formation: 1945
- Founded at: New York
- Type: nonprofit 501(c)(4) organization
- Region served: United States
- Website: https://www.goldstarwives.org/

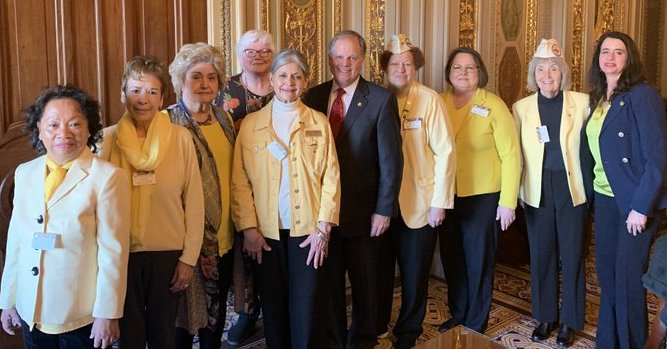
Gold Star Wives of America with Doug Jones at the United States Capitol in 2019.

The Gold Star Wives of America (Gold Star Spouses) (GSW) is a private 501(c)(4) nonprofit organization formed before the end of World War II that provides support for surviving spouses and children of those who lost their lives due to military service in the Armed Forces of the United States.

== History ==
In March 1929, the Congress passed a law to offer financial compensations to mothers and wives of soldiers killed on the field. From 1930 to 1933, the government paid for more than 6,000 Gold Star mothers and wives to go to Europe to pray onsite for their lost ones.

The first meeting took place on April 5, 1945, when four young widows met in Marie Jordan's apartment on West 20th Street in New York City. One week later, President Franklin D. Roosevelt died, and shortly thereafter, Eleanor Roosevelt joined the organization. Mrs. Roosevelt attended meetings, wrote about the organization in her My Day column, entertained children of Gold Star Wives at a picnic at her home in Hyde Park, New York, served on the first board of directors, and was one of the original 15 signers when the organization was chartered as a non-profit organization in the State of New York in December 1945. The group holds a congressional charter under Title 36 of the United States Code under Public Law 96-497.

From the outset, the organization sponsored a variety of activities for the children, and guided them as they formed their own auxiliary of the organization called the Gold Star Sons and Daughters.

Gold Star Wives groups were soon organized in other cities throughout the country, and were chartered as chapters of the Gold Star Wives of America, Inc.s The Korean War, Vietnam, the Gulf War, Afghanistan and Iraq brought in new groups of widows (widowers). Added to the survivors of service personnel killed in action are thousands who die each year from service-connected causes. Remarried widows are eligible for membership.

In 1980, the organization received its federal charter from Congress.

In 1947, the US Congress established the Gold Star label pin presented to spouses and families of service officers killed in combat.

In 2005, the GSW’s legislative priority was to eliminate the Survivor Benefit Plan (SBP) and Dependency and Indemnity Compensation (DIC). The SBP-DIC offsets affected more than 59,000 military survivors and the GSW advocated for their elimination for all affected survivors and not only select categories in 2007. In 2008, the three widows supported by the GSW sued the federal government over the SBP-DIC offsets and the U.S. Court of Fedral Claims rejected the governments motion to dismiss the case. The combined amount unlawfully withheld since December 2003 was $105,000.

A senate resolution created the Gold Star Wives Day, which was first celebrated on December 18, 2010. Each year on 5 April, America celebrates Gold Star Spouses Day.

== Description ==
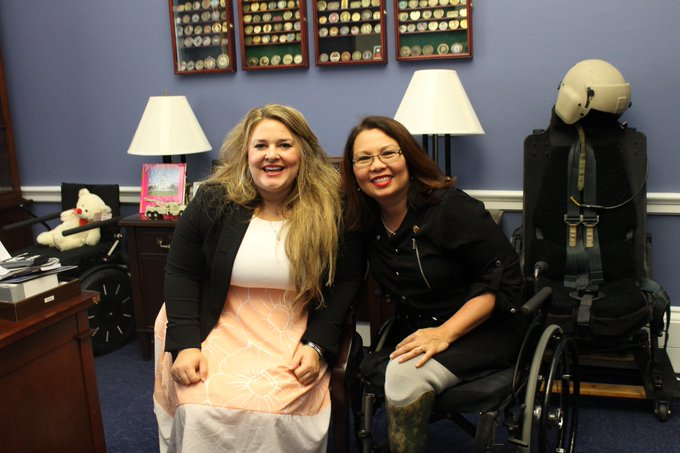
Gold Star Wife Jane Horton visiting with Senator Tammy Duckworth in 2016.

There are members and local chapters throughout the United States. The country is divided into eight regions. Region conferences are held in the spring where recommendations originate for presentation to the national convention held each year, usually in July.

An Appreciation Award Reception is held in Washington, D.C. in late May honoring those who have shown that they have gratefully remembered those who gave their lives in the service of our country, and their survivors.

== See also ==
- Blue Star Mothers Club
- Gold Star Fathers Act of 2014
- Gold Star Lapel Button
- Gold Star Mothers Club
- Service flag
- Yellow ribbon
