= Blue Star Mothers of America =

Private nonprofit organization in the United States

- Formation: 1941
- Founder: George H. Maines, Robert Queissner
- Type: 501(c)(3) nonprofit organization
- Purpose: Rehabilitation, support of military families, hospital work, children's welfare
- Region served: United States
- Members: >7,500
- Website: https://www.bluestarmothers.org/

Blue Star Mothers of America, Inc. (BSMA), is a private nonprofit organization in the United States that provides support for mothers who have sons or daughters in active service in the U.S. Armed Forces. It was originally formed during World War II. The name came from the custom of families of servicemen hanging a banner called a Service Flag in a window of their homes. The Service Flag had a star for each family member in the military. Living servicemen were represented by a Blue Star and those who had lost their lives were represented by a Gold Star. Until 2011, membership in the Blue Star Mothers was open to any woman living in America who has a son or daughter (and in some cases, stepchildren) in the United States Armed Forces, or who has had a son or daughter in the U.S. Armed Forces who was honorably discharged.

At the National Convention held August 2010 in Grand Junction, Colorado under the leadership of National President Wendy Hoffman, members passed a resolution changing membership eligibility. The resolution was taken to congress in August 2011 and was signed into law December 13, 2011. It expanded membership opportunities for more women who have supported service members in new conflicts and different family structures.

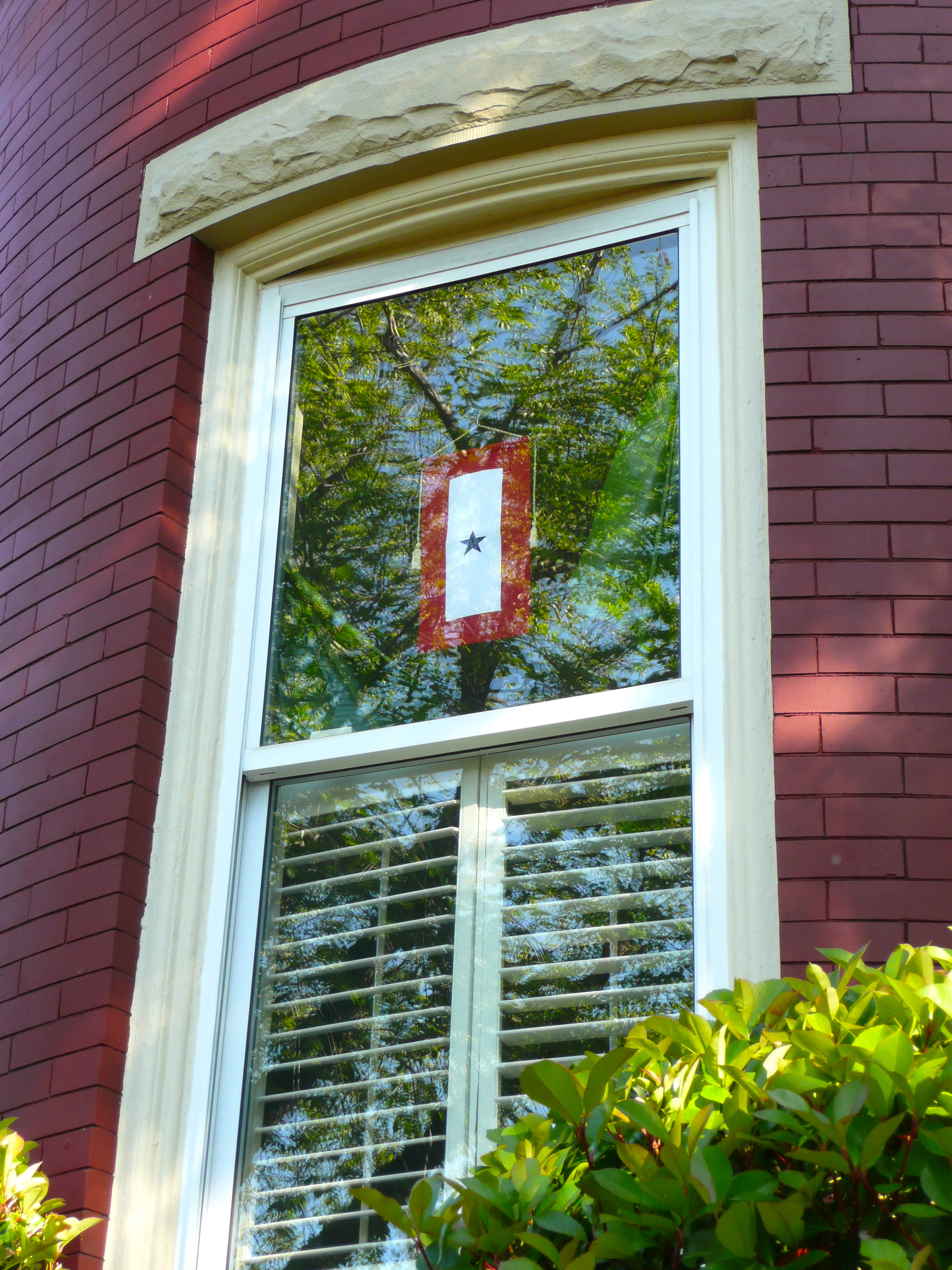
Blue Star flag in window, June 2012

The law updates the Blue Star Mothers Congressional Charter to include: grandmothers, adoptive mothers, foster mothers, and female legal guardians. The law also expands membership to mothers whose children have served more recently by removing references to specific conflicts. It also expands membership to eligible mothers living outside of the U.S.

The group holds a congressional charter under Title 36 of the United States Code.

== Founding of the Blue Star Mothers ==
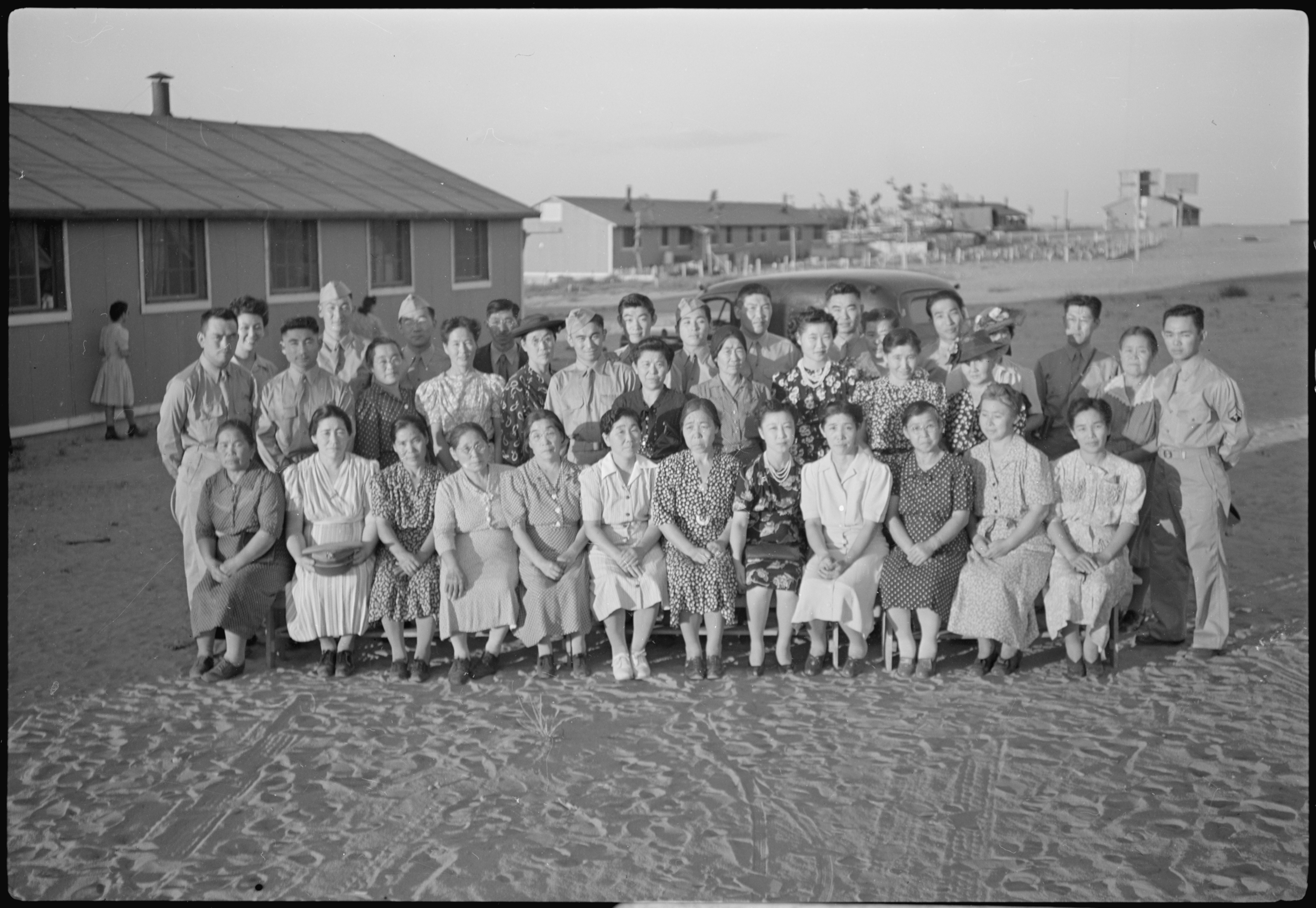
Blue Star Mothers, wives, and visiting soldiers, Granada Relocation Center, Colorado, June 1943

Retired Army Capt. George H. Maines conceived the idea for the Blue Star Mothers after a conversation with General John Pershing. He ran a newspaper article in the Flint News Advertiser on January 22, 1942. A coupon was included in the article and for each one returned, the mother received a blue star, one for each child overseas. More than 1,000 mothers responded. On February 1, 1942 their first meeting was held and 300 mothers attended. They showed their support of Captain Maines and the Blue Star Mothers of America was formed. This meeting was reported in the Flint Journal on February 2, 1942. Corrections posted by Kathy Barnes, PDP, Keeper of the History, Dept. of Michigan BSMA.

That same year, chapters quickly formed in Michigan, Ohio, Wisconsin, Oregon, Iowa, Washington, California, Pennsylvania, and New York.

The blue star flag was designed and patented by World War I Army Capt. Robert Queissner of the 5th Ohio Infantry, who had two sons serving on the front line. This flag quickly became the unofficial symbol of a family member in service.

The Blue Star Mothers' original goals were to bring their sons home, to ensure they received the benefits they deserved, help service members' families, help each other and to be there if something happened. Over the years, the goals have broadened to rehabilitation, hospital work, children's welfare and civil defense.

The largest family of the Blue Star Mothers belonged to Nick and Anna Matthees of rural Goddhue, Minnesota who sent 7 sons (3 Army, 2 Navy, and 2 Army Air Force) to serve during World War II. All 7 survived.

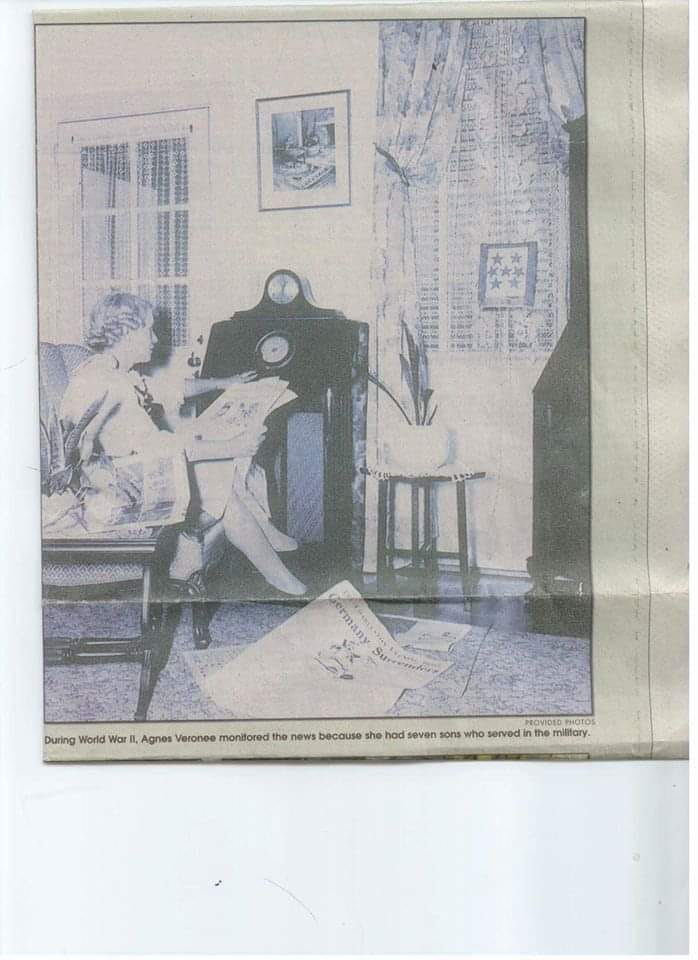
Charleston SC newspaper article about Agnes Veronee on VE-Day with 7-star flag

== Blue Star Mothers today ==
Prior to December 2011, membership in the Blue Star Mothers was open to any woman in America whose child is in the United States Armed Forces or who has served in the United States Armed Forces or had an honorable discharge. Stepmothers and adoptive mothers are also now eligible for membership. Blue Star Fathers and others who wish to serve BSMA, Inc. may join as Associate Members. Associate members do not vote or pay dues.

At National Convention in 2010, under the leadership of National President Wendy Hoffman, a resolution was passed by the convention body changing eligibility for membership. The resolution was taken to Capitol Hill and in August 2011 a bill was introduced to Congress, followed soon after by a matching bill in the senate. Both Bills passed and on December 13, 2011, President Obama signed the Act and the eligibility for membership was expanded to include grandmothers, foster mothers, stepmothers, and female legal guardians. Membership is also now open to American citizens living in other countries.

Blue Star Mothers is made up of local chapters, which are organized into departments in some states. Five members are required to start a local chapter.

Just as when it was founded, the Blue Star Mothers continues to concentrate on providing emotional support to its members, providing support to active military troops, doing volunteer work with veterans in general and veterans' hospitals in particular, and fostering a sense of patriotism and respect for members of the Armed Forces. In addition, local chapters carry out individual projects of their own choosing.

Blue Star Mothers do more than volunteer in VA hospitals and outreach centers. They work in physical and emotional rehabilitation, help with medical supplies, transportation, food, clothing and emotional support.

Blue Star Mothers do not have a permanent headquarters, so the headquarters travels with the national president. The current National President (2014–15) is Judy Dorsey of Ohio. Convention locations are chosen by the National President each year. Recent conventions have been held in Washington, D.C., Cincinnati, and San Francisco.

There were about 30,000 members during World War II and several thousand during the Korean War and Vietnam War. By July 2006, membership had grown to 164 chapters nationally. As of April 2014, there are over 7,500 members and associates in approximately 200 chapters.

== See also ==
- American War Mothers
- Gold Star Lapel Button
- Gold Star Mothers Club
