= Gold Star Lapel Button =

American military next of kin decoration

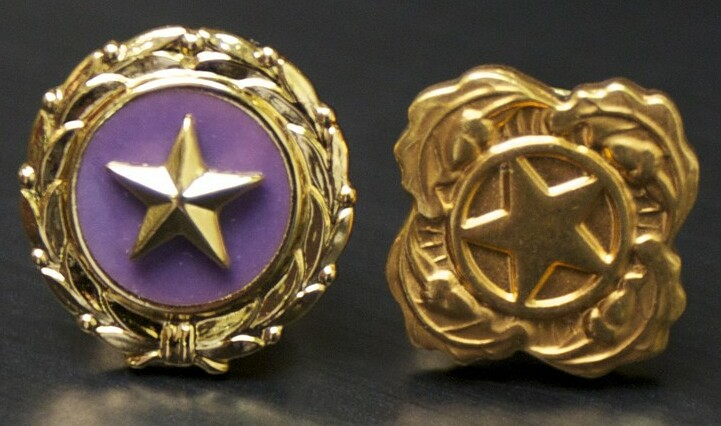
A Gold Star Lapel Button (left) and Next of Kin Lapel Button

A Gold Star Lapel Button in the United States is an official decoration authorized by an Act of Congress that is issued to the direct next of kin family members of service members who died in World War I, World War II, and subsequent armed hostilities in which the Armed Forces of the United States has been engaged. The Gold Star Lapel Button was established by Act of Congress, Public Law 80-306, in August 1947.

A Next of Kin Lapel Button is issued when service members die while on active duty but outside of a qualifying conflict, such as during a training accident.

== Award criteria ==
The issuance of the Gold Star Lapel Button for the next of kin consists the following time periods:

(1) World War I, April 6, 1917, to March 3, 1921;
(2) World War II, September 8, 1939, to July 25, 1947;
(3) Any subsequent period of armed hostilities in which the U.S. was engaged before July 1, 1958; or
(4) After June 30, 1958, while

(a) engaged in an action against an enemy of the United States; or
(b) engaged in military operations involving conflict with an opposing foreign force; or
(c) serving with friendly foreign forces engaged in an armed conflict in which the United States is not a belligerent party against an opposing armed force; or

(5) who lost their lives after March 28, 1973, as a result of:

(a) an international terrorist attack against the U.S. or a foreign nation friendly to the U.S., recognized as an attack by the Secretary of the Military Department concerned; or
(b) military operations while serving outside the U.S. (including the commonwealths, territories, and possessions of the U.S.), as part of a peacekeeping force.

One Gold Star Lapel Button will be furnished, without cost, to the widow, widower and to each of the parents (mother, father, stepmother, stepfather, mother through adoption, father through adoption and foster parents), children (step children and children through adoption), brothers, sisters, half brothers, and half sisters.

== Appearance ==
The Gold Star Lapel Button consists of a gold star on a purple circular background, bordered in gold and surrounded by gold laurel leaves. On the reverse is the inscription "United States of America, Act of Congress, August 1966" with space for engraving the initials of the recipient.

== See also ==
- Blue Star Mothers Club
- American Gold Star Mothers
- Gold Star Wives of America
- Purple Heart
- Service flag
- Yellow ribbon
