= Naval Enlisted Reserve Association =

Naval Enlisted Reserve Association(NERA)
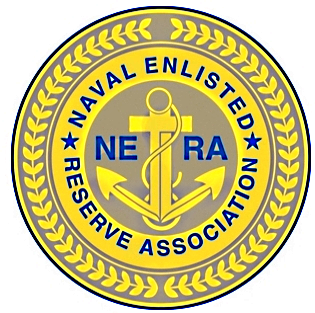
- Founded: 1957
- Founder: Joe Wasson and Thomas Patton
- Dissolved: 2026
- Type: Non-profit veteran association
- Purpose: Veterans Affairs, Sea Service Reservist Benefits, Wounded Warrior Care, GI Bill Parity for Reservists, Coast Guard parity for pay and benefits and TRICARE fees and increases
- Location: 8116 Arlington Blvd, Ste 229, Falls Church, VA 22042
- Coordinates: 51°29′24″N 0°05′58″W
- Members: c. 11,000
- Key people: President Joanne Elliott; Vice President Curtis DeYoung; Secretary Debbie Fallon; National Treasurer Dennis Hunt; National Counselor Geno Koelker; Stephen Sandy, Executive Director
- Employees: 3
- Website: nera.org

Naval Enlisted Reserve Association (NERA) was a military advocacy group in the United States, who specifically addressed the agenda of sea-service reservists. Their stated mission was to protect the rights and benefits of enlisted sea-service reservists such as promotion, pay, retirement benefits, personnel strength, and equipment. NERA was a prominent member of a powerful coalition of military advocacy groups dedicated to fighting for service members in the Nation's Capitol.

NERA helped maintain national security by ensuring a strong and well-trained Naval, Coast Guard and Marine Corps Reserve. They were the only military association composed exclusively of enlisted Sea Service Reservists. NERA represented enlisted Sea Service Reservists by providing a singular voice to the Congress, the White House and the Departments of Defense and Transportation regarding issues of benefits and rights.

The NERA provided the NERA College Scholarship Program to deserving applicants and five $1000 to $2500 scholarships were awarded yearly.

== History ==
The association was founded by two Naval Reserve Chief Enginemen, Joe Wasson and Thomas Patton, on March 25, 1957. "We wanted to have an organization that paralleled the one that officers had (Naval Reserve Association) started four years earlier," said Wasson, who joined the Naval Reserve in 1942, serving on active duty during World War II. The headquarters of NERA is in Falls Church, Virginia, near Washington, DC.

== Organization ==
NERA is headed by a National Elected Council (NEC). The National President is elected and serves for a 2-year term with an option to run for a second term. The other officers elected to the council are President, Vice President, Secretary, Treasurer and National Counselor. Elections occur bi-annually (every other year) during the National Conference which takes place in the Fall.

In 2024, Stephen Sandy was the executive director and Yvette Purtill was deputy executive director. Joanne Elliott held the position of President of the NERA.

NERA is organized into chapters located within all 50 states. The Washington, DC–based chapter, "Joe Wasson", is named after co-founder Joe Wasson.

== Membership ==
The Association's membership includes standard, associate, commissioned and complimentary members. Membership is available to enlisted members of the Navy, Coast Guard and Marines. It includes retirees, Full-Time Support (FTS), drilling reservists and associate members supporting our enlisted sea service reservists. Members usually join a NERA chapter and those that do not are members of a NERA Region. Membership cost is $30 yearly.
