= Service flag =

Banner that family members of those serving in the United States Armed Forces can display

Service flag
Blue Star Service Banner

Gold Star Service Banner

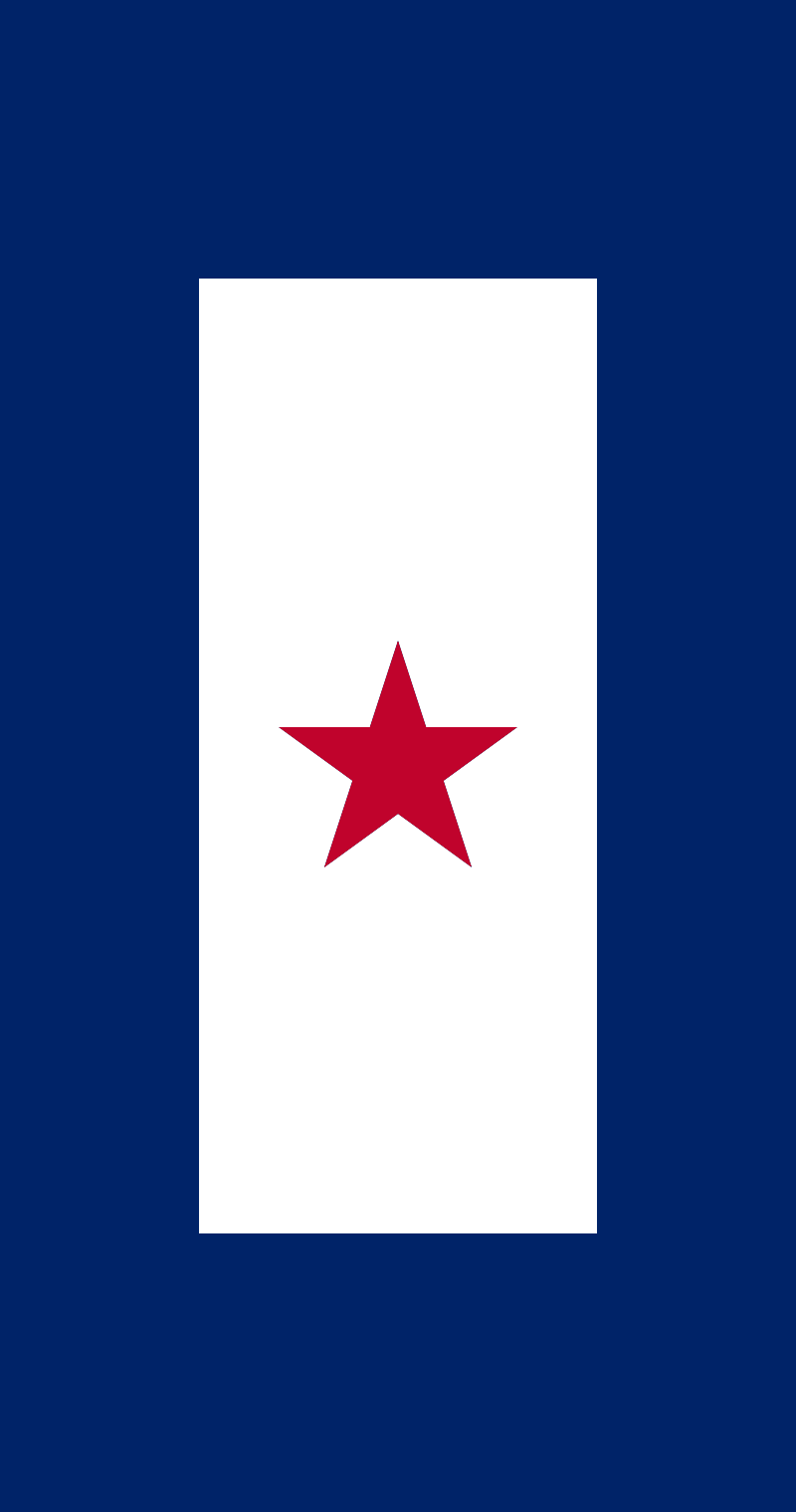
Red Star Service Banner

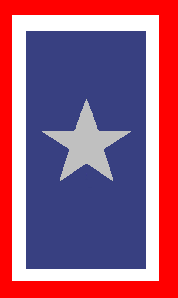
Silver Star Service Banner

A service flag or service banner is a banner that family members of those serving in the United States Armed Forces can display. The flag or banner is officially defined as a white field with a red border, with a blue star for each family member serving in the Armed Forces of the United States during any period of war or hostilities. A gold star (with a blue edge) represents a family member who died during military operations, including those who died during World War I, World War II, or any subsequent period of armed hostilities in which the United States was engaged before July 1, 1958, and those who lost or lose their lives after June 30, 1958:

1. while engaged in an action against an enemy of the United States;
2. while engaged in military operations involving conflict with an opposing foreign force; or
3. while serving with friendly foreign forces engaged in an armed conflict in which the United States is not a belligerent party against an opposing armed force;

or those who lost or lose their lives after March 28, 1973, as a result of:

1. an international terrorist attack against the United States or a foreign nation friendly to the United States, recognized as such an attack by the Secretary of Defense; or
2. military operations while serving outside the United States (including the commonwealths, territories, and possessions of the United States) as part of a peacekeeping force.

== Background ==
Based on the star symbols used on the service flag, the term "Blue Star" has come into use in the United States as a reference to having a family member in active military service, while the term "Gold Star" has come to refer to the loss of a family member in military service. For example, the mother of a person who died in service is referred to as a "Gold Star mother", and the wife of an active service member is referred to as a "Blue Star wife". Charitable support organizations have been established for Gold Star mothers, Gold Star wives, Blue Star mothers, and Blue Star wives. The last Sunday in September is observed as Gold Star Mother's Day, Gold Star family members are entitled to wear a Gold Star Lapel Button, and all 50 U.S. states and Guam offer some form of a specialty license plate for motor vehicles owned by Gold Star family members.

President Wilson gave permission to allow mothers or family members to sew a gold star over a blue star flag if a family member had passed away overseas at war.

The use of the terms has sometimes been restricted to refer to service during specific armed conflicts. For example, the service banner originally applied only to World War I, and it was later expanded to include service in World War II, then the Korean War, then other specific conflicts, and then "any period of war or hostilities". In some current uses of the "star" terminology, there is no longer any distinction made about the place or time or degree of hostility involved in the military service. For Gold Stars, the Department of Defense also makes a distinction about the manner and place of death, but some other organizations do not. The Gold Star term is also sometimes interpreted to apply to those missing in action and those who did not die during active service but died later as a result of an in-service injury.

A lesser-known practice of using a silver star to indicate a service member that has been disabled is sometimes also followed, this service banner became federally recognized on April 21st, 2010, when the House of Representatives passed House Resolution 855 and also created May 1st as Silver Star Service Banner Day . The idea of the banner is used primarily in US. Other countries such as Germany or UK don't have a certain banner to symbolize their soldiers they do hold ceremonies to represent lost or active members but nothing like a home front symbol like the US.

In August 2024 the Red Star Service Banner was created by the Red Star Foundation. Creating a symbol of hope and recognition for the families who have lost a service member or veteran to suicide. On January 28, 2025, Rep. Jack Bergman (MI) read the Red Star Service Banner into the Congressional Record.

== History ==
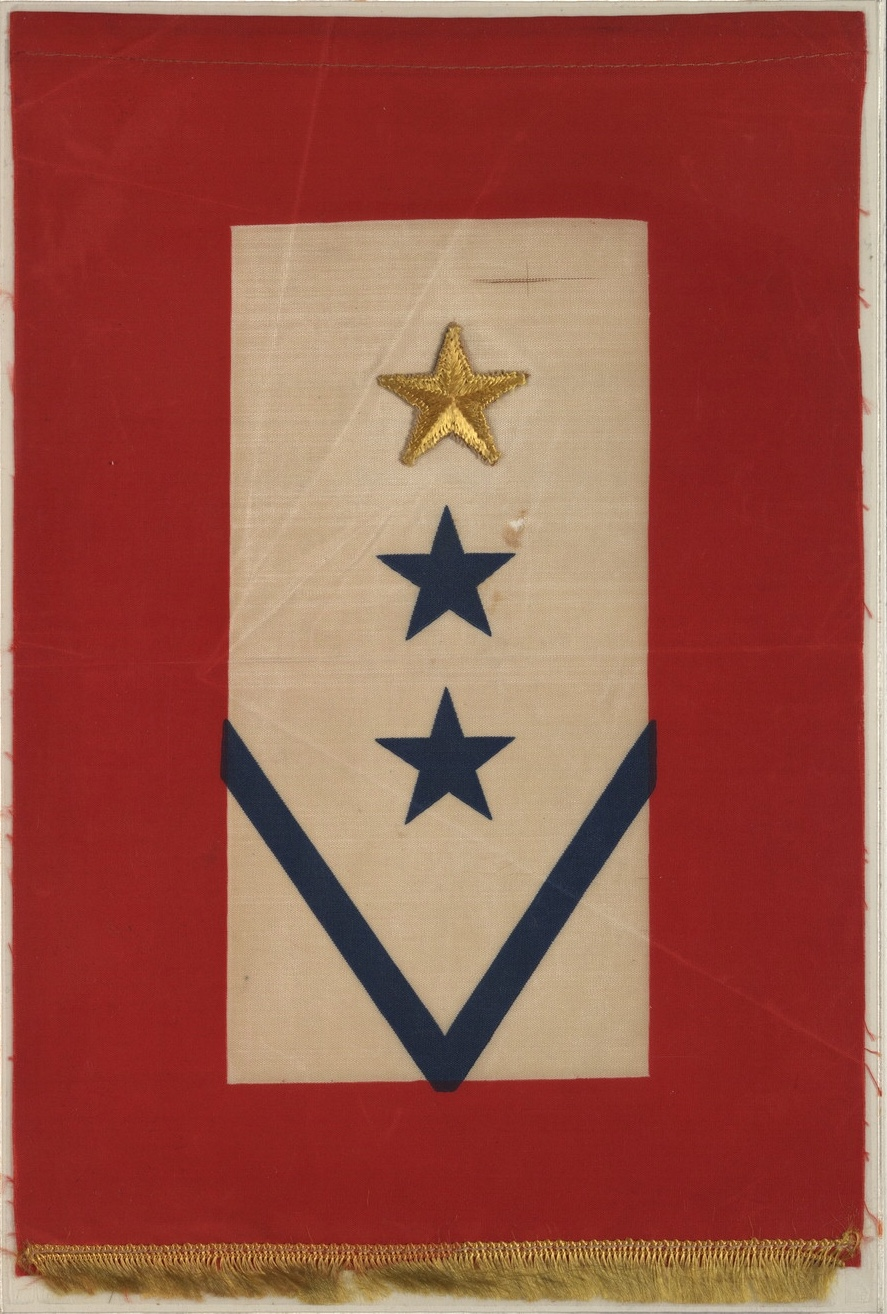
World War II–era service flag

The banner was designed in 1917 by U.S. Army Captain Robert L. Queisser of the Fifth Ohio Infantry, in honor of his two sons who were serving in World War I. It was quickly adopted by the public and by government officials. On September 24, 1917, an Ohio congressman read into the Congressional Record:

The mayor of Cleveland, the Chamber of Commerce, and the Governor of Ohio have adopted this service flag. The world should know of those who give so much for liberty. The dearest thing in all the world to a father and mother—their children.

The United Service Flag Company in Cleveland, Ohio ran an advertisement in the October 1917 issue of National Geographic Magazine for service flags and pins, reading:

THE AUTHORIZED SERVICE FLAG

SHOULD BE FLOWN FROM EVERY HOME

Do as Col. Roosevelt does at Oyster Bay - fly the "Badge of Honor" from your home, telling all the world that some one from your family is serving the country in army, navy, marines, or other service. This is the original flag so crudely imitated. Approved by War Secretary Baker. Bill in Congress to make it official emblem. Fast-color, strong, wool bunting, 36 x 24 inches; red border, white field; one large blue star for every man in service; sewed throughout, not printed. Sent postpaid for $2 - 1 to 5 stars. (Larger sizes for clubs, churches, business houses, etc., made to order.) SERVICE FLAG PINS to wear in lapel or waist, 14k. gold plate and enamel, 1 to 3 stars, pin or screw back, high-grade quality, 50 cents; sterling silver; $1; solid gold, $2.

The United Service Flag Co., 1255 Schofield Bldg., Cleveland, O.

== Usage ==
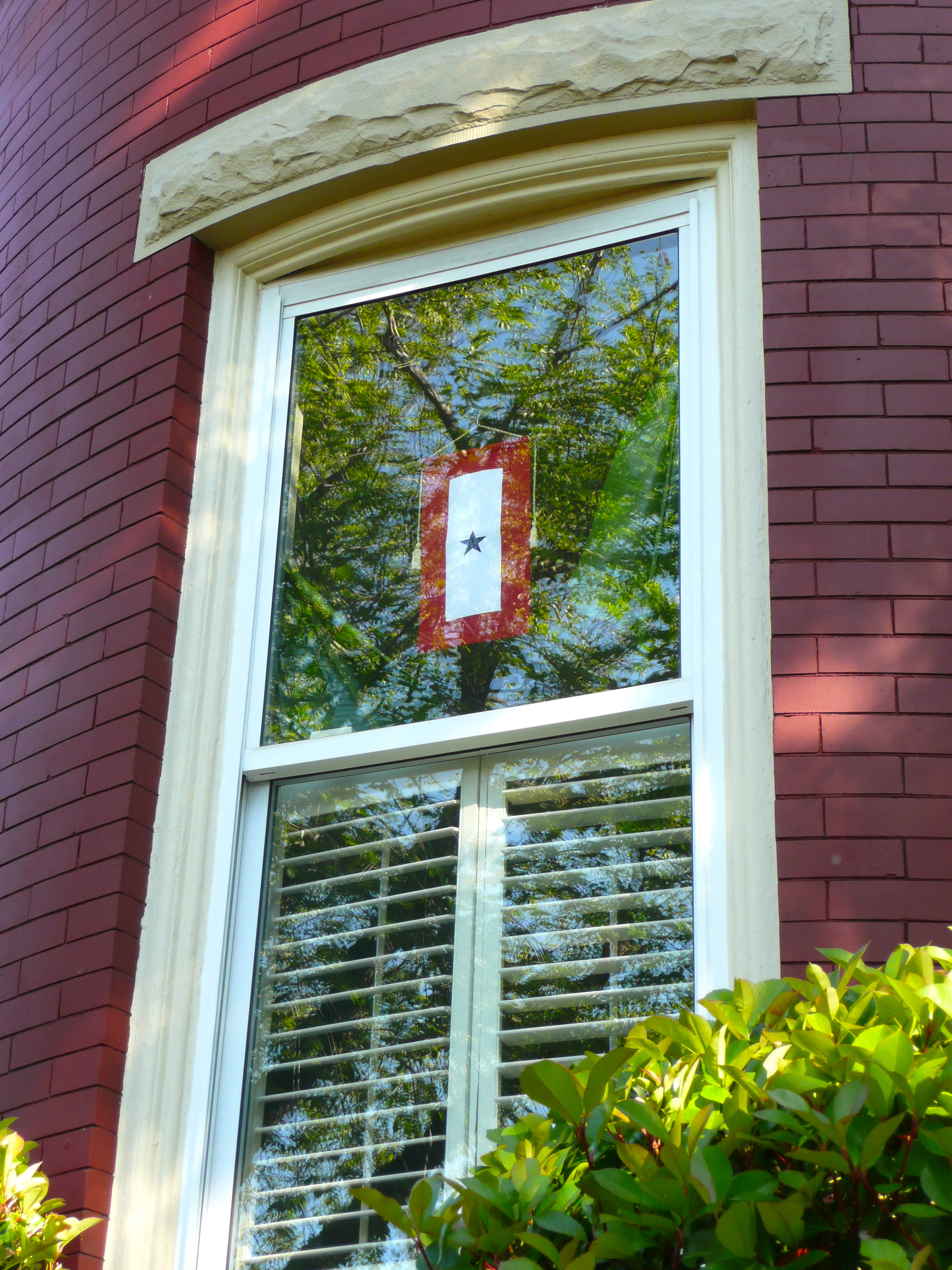
Blue Star flag displayed in a window, June 2012

These flags were first used in World War I, with subsequent standardization and codification by the end of World War II. They were not popular during the Vietnam War, but have come back into use since the first Gulf War/Operation Desert Storm. In modern usage, an organization may fly a service flag if one of its members is serving active duty.

Manufacture of these flags is only allowed by specific government license in the territories under U.S. jurisdiction. The same section of the United States Code that limits manufacture of the banner also mentions lapel pins. There is no legal specification of the banner's size, but according to the DoD code, the flag size ratio must be 10:19, the same as the Flag of the United States. When displayed with the national flag, the latter should take the place of honor. If the flags displayed differ in size, the national flag should be larger.

Blue and gold are the only colors specified for use, but silver stars are increasingly in use to represent those discharged from service because of wounds or being invalided home. The Silver Star Families of America is an organization attempting to encourage the U.S. Congress to make the Silver Star Service Banner official for those wounded or injured in a war zone. Forty-nine states, Guam, Saipan, the U.S. Virgin Islands, the Chickasaw Nation and over 2,700 cities and counties have issued proclamations in support of the Silver Star Banner and of Silver Star Service Banner Day on May 1 of every year.

On April 21, 2010, the United States House of Representatives passed House Resolution 855, a stand-alone resolution recognizing the Silver Star Service Banner and making May 1 Silver Star Service Banner Day. One state, Missouri, took steps to make such recognition a state law.

In World War II, the Brazilian Clube Militar (Military Club) and the Casino da Urca adopted the concepts of the U.S. service banner by giving posters to the family members of the Brazilian Expeditionary Force. On these posters the phrase Daqui saiu um Expedicionário was written, which means "From here came an Expeditionary". Although the design differs from the U.S. banners, the mothers of the Brazilian soldiers also received a pin prominently featuring a blue star similar to U.S. pins.

== Individuals entitled to display ==
The individuals entitled to display the service flag are officially defined in 36 U.S.C. § 901 which reads:

A service flag approved by the Secretary of Defense may be displayed in a window of the place of residence of individuals who are members of the immediate family of an individual serving in the Armed Forces of the United States during any period of war or hostilities in which the Armed Forces of the United States are engaged.

The U.S. Code also discusses the wearing of lapel pins.

== Gold Star Mother's Day ==
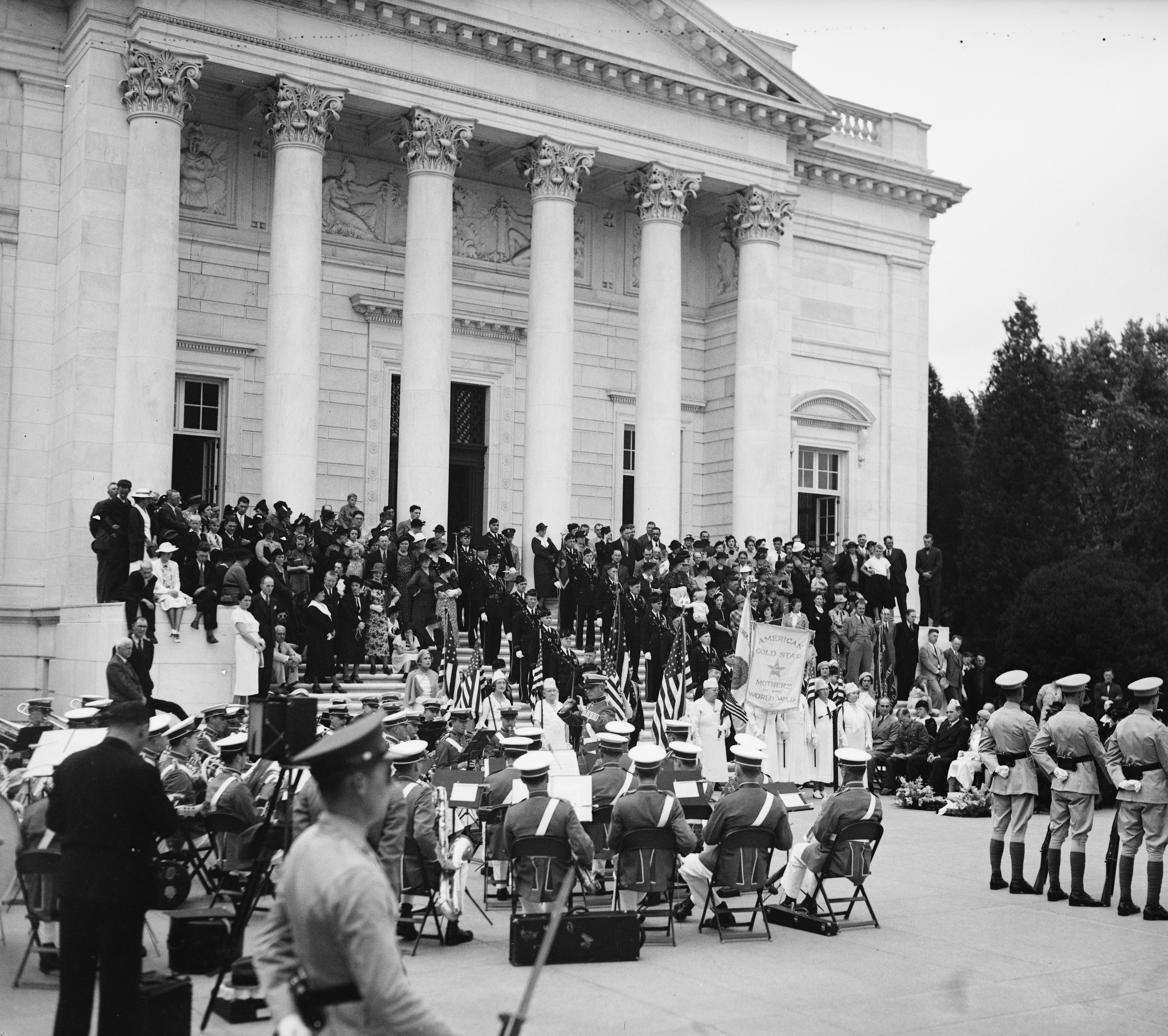
Gold Star Mother's Day at Arlington National Cemetery in 1936

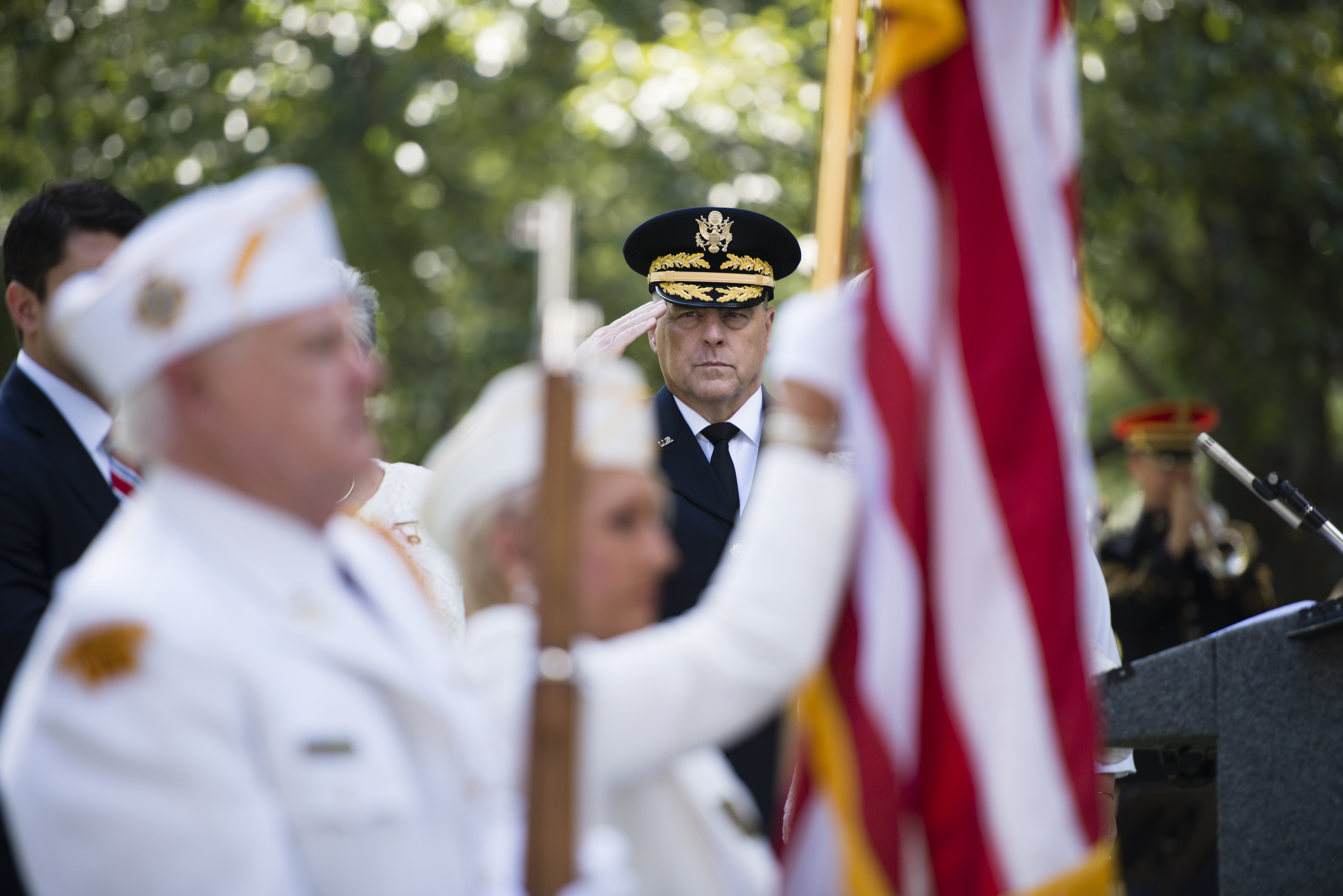
Mark A. Milley, Chief of Staff of the Army, salutes during the 80th commemoration of Gold Star Mother's and Family's Day at Arlington National Cemetery in 2016

On the last Sunday in September, Gold Star Mother's Day is observed in the U.S. in honor of Gold Star mothers, as established in Title 36 § 111 of the United States Code. This was originally declared by Senate Joint Resolution 115 of June 23, 1936.

In 2009, Barack Obama proclaimed the observance as Gold Star Mother's and Families' Day. Since 2011 it has been proclaimed as Gold Star Mother's and Family's Day.

== Gold Star license plates ==
All fifty U.S. states and Guam offer some form of a specialty license plate for motor vehicles owned by members of Gold Star families.

== See also ==
- American Gold Star Mothers
- Blue Star Mothers Club
- Gold Star Families for Peace
- Gold Star Lapel Button
- Gold Star Wives of America
- Service lapel button (disambiguation)
- Yellow ribbon

== External links and further reading ==
- "For Those Who Carry On: The Service Flag Still Waves and Makers of Novelties Find Many Ways to Display It". Popular Science. February 1919. p. 29.
- United States Government (multiple dates). "Factsheet: Service Flag and Service Lapel Button". Pentagon.mil. Archived from the original on 2006-04-11.
- "The Service Flag of the United States". usflag.org. United States Naval Academy. November 20, 1994.
- "U.S. Service Flags". atlasgeo.span.ch/fotw/flags/us%5Esvc.html. Archived from the original on 2004-08-04.
