= February =

Second month in the Julian and Gregorian calendars

<<	February					>>
Su	Mo	Tu	We	Th	Fr	Sa
1	2	3	4	5	6	7
8	9	10	11	12	13	14
15	16	17	18	19	20	21
22	23	24	25	26	27	28
2026

February is the second month of the year in the Julian and Gregorian calendars. The month has 28 days in common years and 29 in leap years, with the 29th day being called the leap day. February is the third and last month of meteorological winter in the Northern Hemisphere. In the Southern Hemisphere, February is the third and last month of meteorological summer, being the seasonal equivalent of August in the Northern Hemisphere. February is preceded by the first month of the year, January, and is succeeded by the third month of the year, March.

== Pronunciation ==
"February" can be pronounced in several different ways. The beginning of the word is commonly pronounced either as /ˈfɛbju-/ FEB-yoo- or /ˈfɛbru-/ FEB-roo-; many people drop the first "r", replacing it with /j/, as if it were spelled "Febuary". This comes about by analogy with "January" (/ˈdʒæn.ju-/), as well as by a dissimilation effect whereby having two "r"s close to each other causes one to change. The ending of the word is pronounced /-ɛri/ -err-ee in the US and /-əri/ -ər-ee in the UK.

== History ==
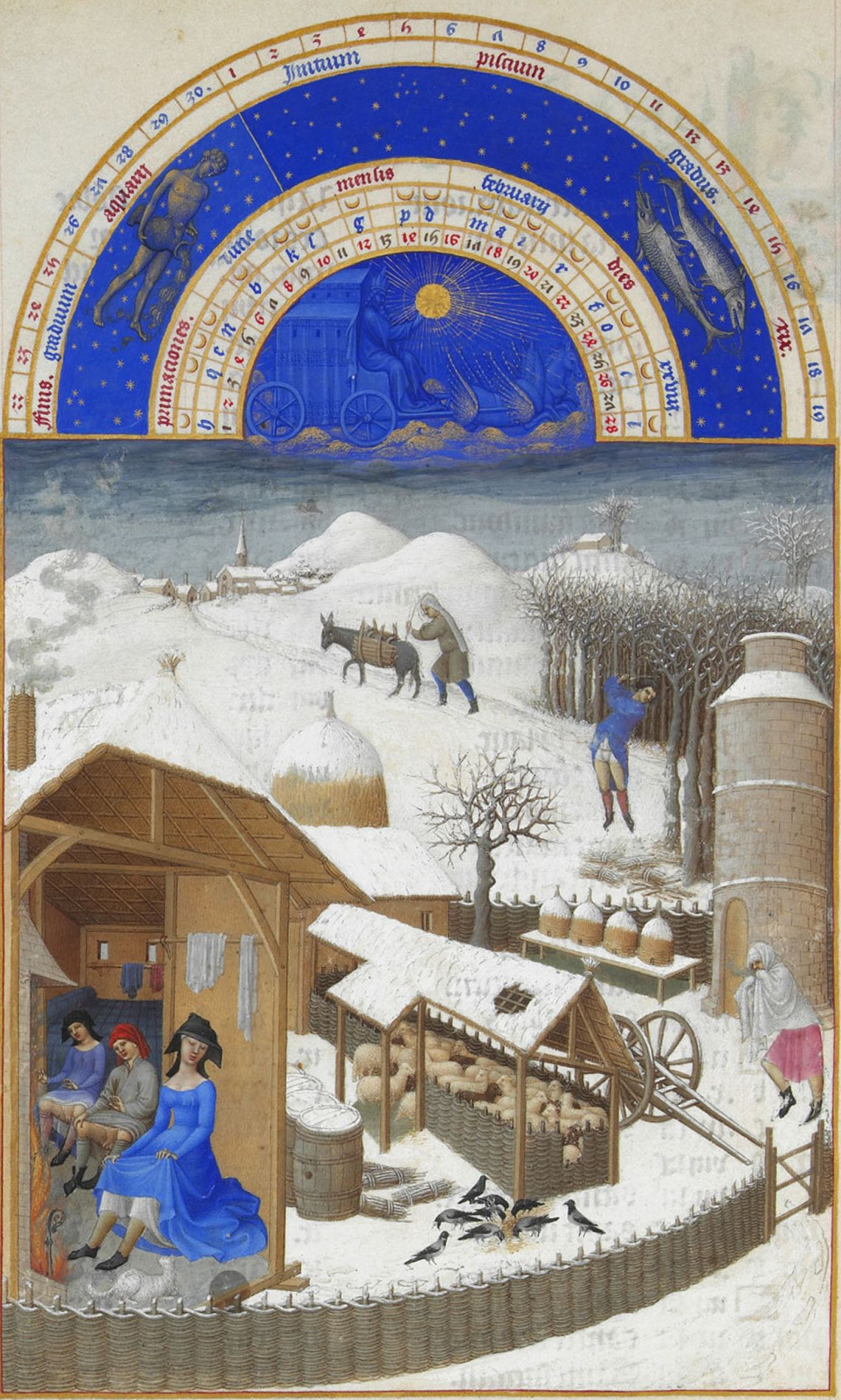
February, from the Très riches heures du Duc de Berry

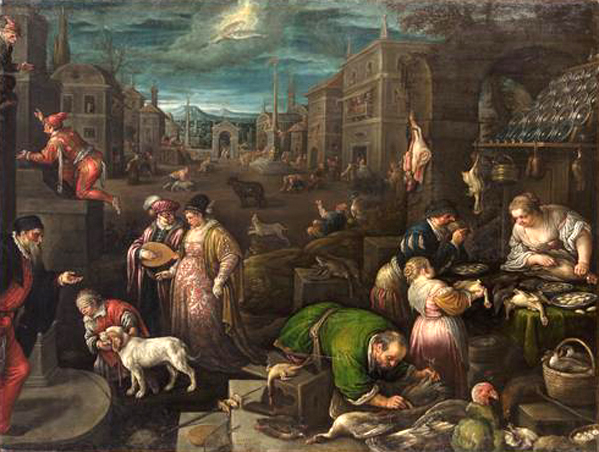
February, Leandro Bassano

In recent decades, the number of warm temperature records in February has outpaced cold temperature records over a growing portion of Earth's surface.

Chart shows changes in global average temperature annually in February of each year

The Roman month Februarius was named after the Latin term februum, which means "purification", via the purification ritual Februa held on February 15 (full moon) in the old lunar Roman calendar. January and February were the last two months to be added to the Roman calendar since the Romans originally considered winter a monthless period of the year. They were added by Numa Pompilius about 713 BC. February remained the last month of the calendar year until the time of the decemvirs (c. 450 BC), when it became the second month. At certain times, February was truncated to 23 or 24 days, and a 27-day intercalary month, Intercalaris, was occasionally inserted immediately after February to realign the year with the seasons.

February observances in Ancient Rome included Amburbium (precise date unknown), Sementivae (February 2), Februa (February 13–15), Lupercalia (February 13–15), Parentalia (February 13–22), Quirinalia (February 17), Feralia (February 21), Caristia (February 22), Terminalia (February 23), Regifugium (February 24), and Agonium Martiale (February 27). These days do not correspond to the modern Gregorian calendar.

Under the reforms that instituted the Julian calendar, Intercalaris was abolished, leap years occurred regularly every fourth year, and in leap years February gained a 29th day. Thereafter, it remained the second month of the calendar year, meaning the order that months are displayed (January, February, March, ..., December) within a year-at-a-glance calendar. Even during the Middle Ages, when the numbered Anno Domini year began on March 25 or December 25, the second month was February whenever all twelve months were displayed in order. The Gregorian calendar reforms made slight changes to the system for determining which years were leap years, but also contained a 29-day February.

Historical names for February include the Old English terms Solmonath (mud month) and Kale-monath (named for cabbage) as well as Charlemagne's designation Hornung. In Finnish, the month is called helmikuu, meaning "month of the pearl"; when snow melts on tree branches, it forms droplets, and as these freeze again, they are like pearls of ice. In Polish and Ukrainian, respectively, the month is called luty or лютий (lyutiy), meaning the month of ice or hard frost. In Macedonian the month is sečko (сечко), meaning month of cutting (wood). In Czech, it is called únor, meaning month of submerging (of river ice).

In Slovene, February is traditionally called svečan, related to icicles or Candlemas. This name originates from sičan, written as svičan in the New Carniolan Almanac from 1775 and changed to its final form by Franc Metelko in his New Almanac from 1824. The name was also spelled sečan, meaning "the month of cutting down of trees". In 1848, a proposal was put forward in Kmetijske in rokodelske novice by the Slovene Society of Ljubljana to call this month talnik (related to ice melting), but it did not stick. The idea was proposed by a priest, Blaž Potočnik. Another name of February in Slovene was vesnar, after the mythological character Vesna.

== Patterns ==
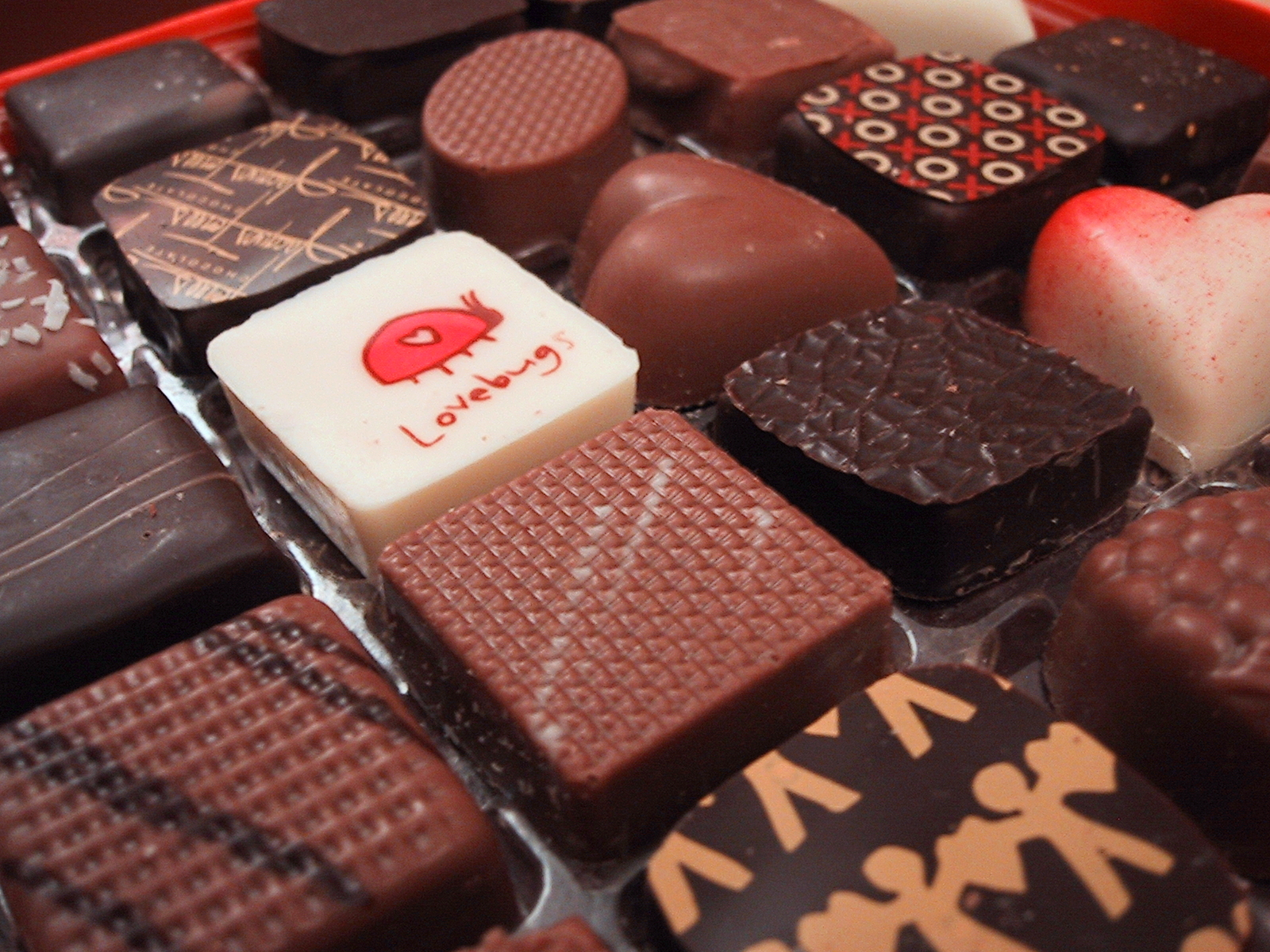
Chocolates for St. Valentine's Day

Having only 28 days in common years, February is the only month of the year that can pass without a single full moon. Using Coordinated Universal Time as the basis for determining the date and time of a full moon, this last happened in 2018 and will next happen in 2037. The same is true regarding a new moon: again using Coordinated Universal Time as the basis, this last happened in 2014 and will next happen in 2033.

February is also the only month of the calendar that, at intervals alternating between one of six years and two of eleven years, has exactly four full 7-day weeks. In countries that start their week on a Monday, it occurs as part of a common year starting on Friday, in which February 1st is a Monday and the 28th is a Sunday; the most recent occurrence was 2021, and the next one will be 2027. In countries that start their week on a Sunday, it occurs in a common year starting on Thursday; the most recent occurrence was 2015 and the next occurrence will be 2026. The pattern is broken by a skipped leap year, but no leap year has been skipped since 1900 and no others will be skipped until 2100.

== Astronomy ==
February meteor showers include the Alpha Centaurids (appearing in early February), the March Virginids (lasting from February 14 to April 25, peaking around March 20), the Delta Cancrids (appearing December 14 to February 14, peaking on January 17), the Omicron Centaurids (late January through February, peaking in mid-February), Theta Centaurids (January 23 – March 12, only visible in the southern hemisphere), Eta Virginids (February 24 and March 27, peaking around March 18), and Pi Virginids (February 13 and April 8, peaking between March 3 and March 9).

== Symbols ==
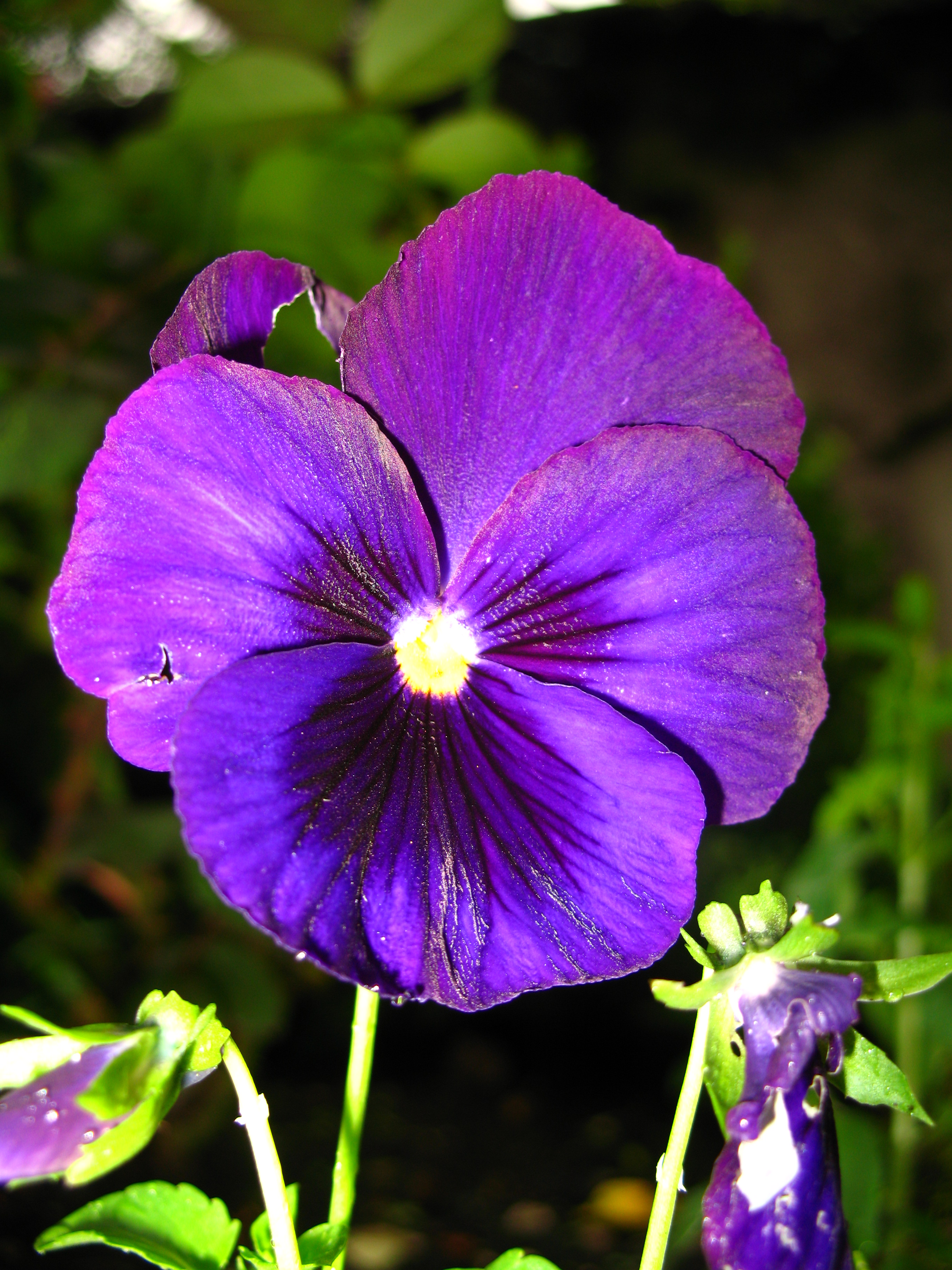
The violet

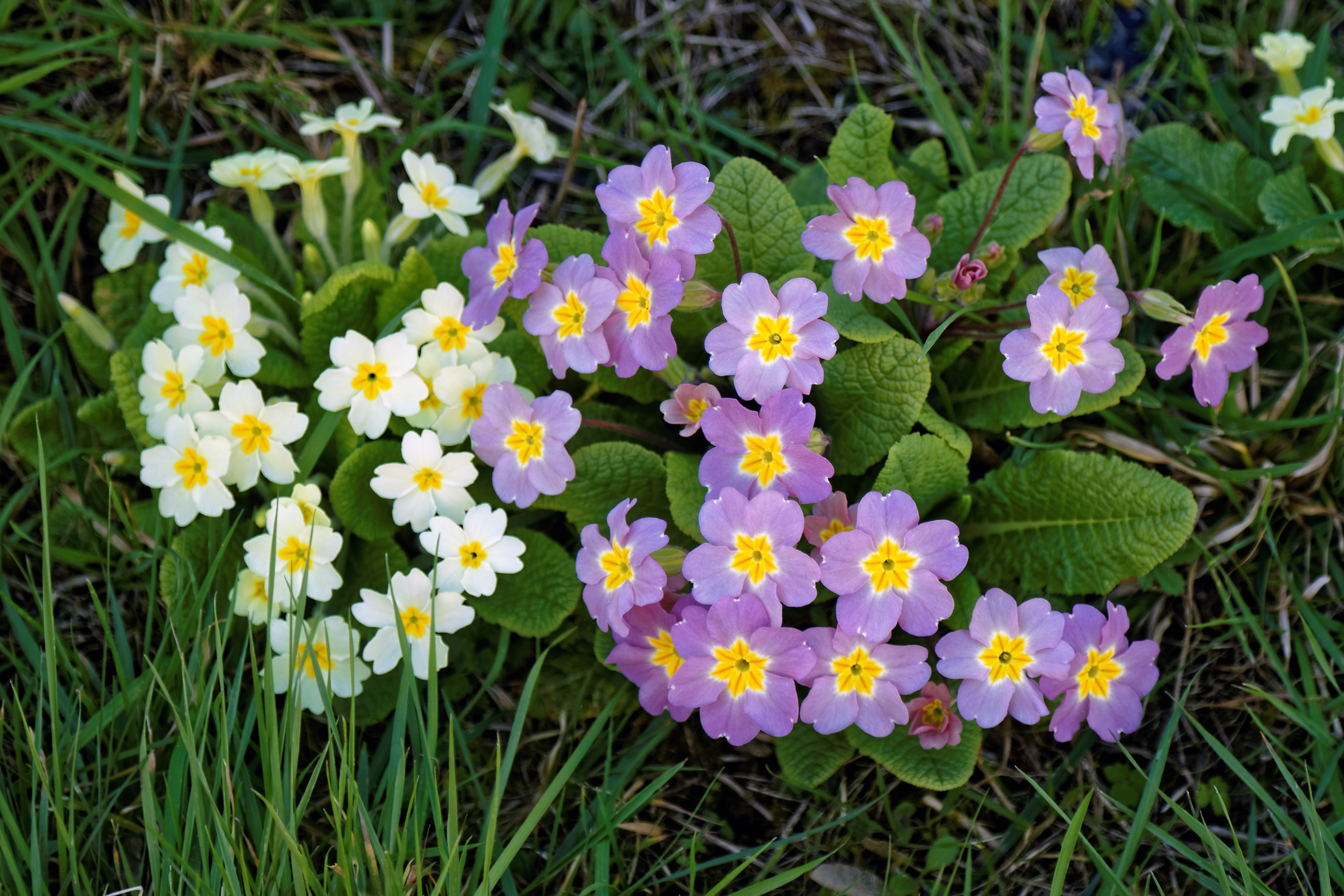
White and mauve primroses

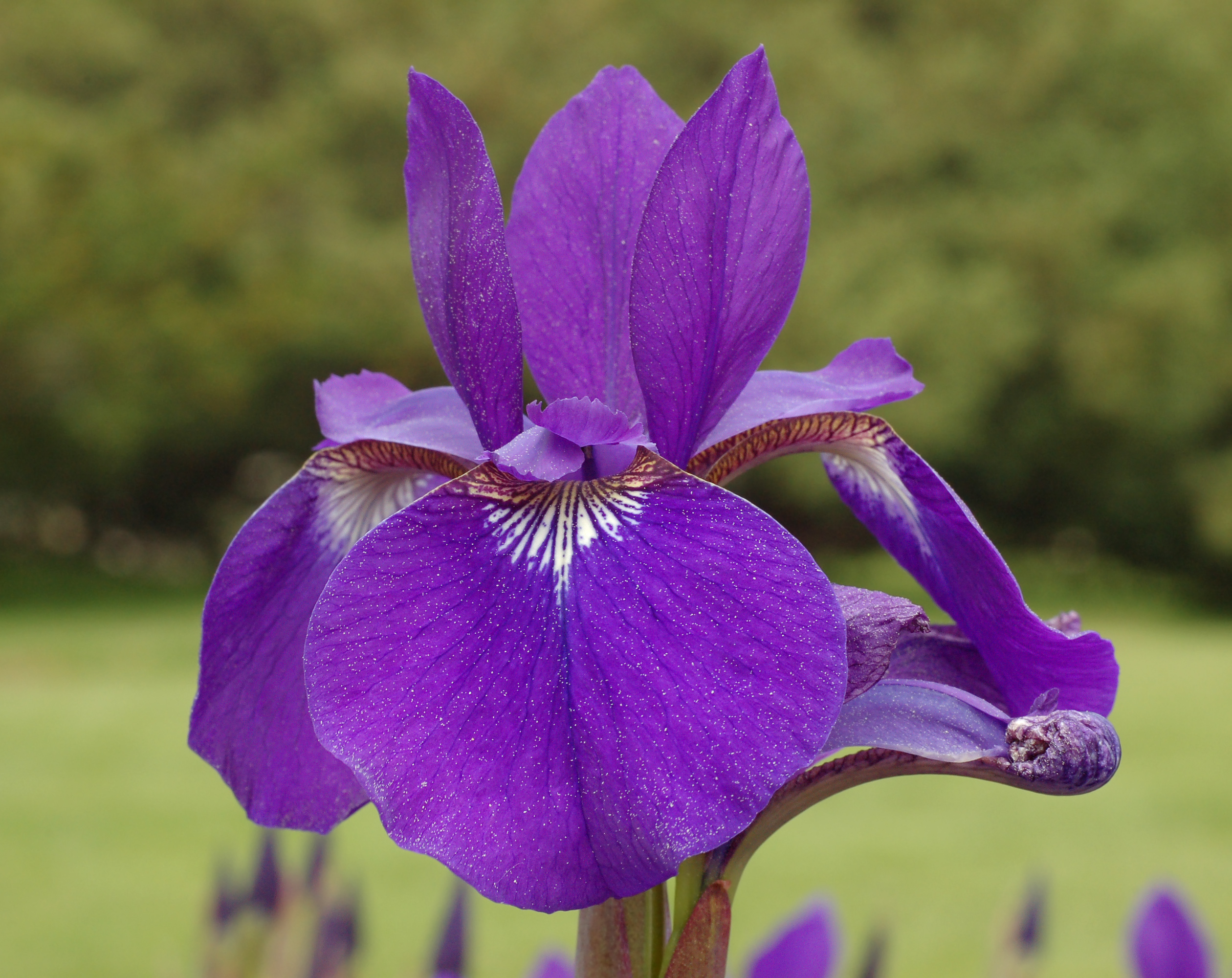
Purple Siberian iris

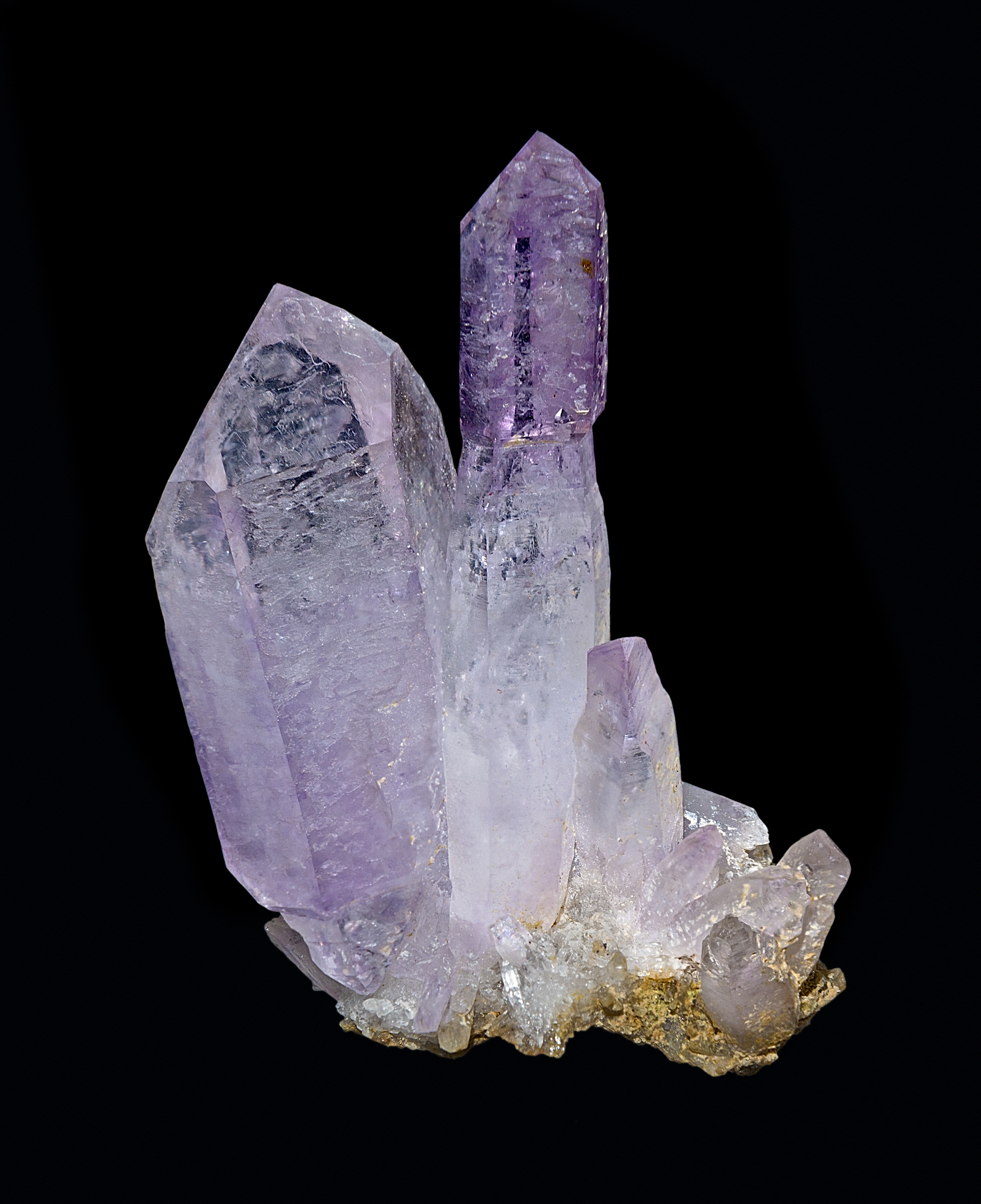
Amethyst crystals

The zodiac signs of February are Aquarius (until February 18) and Pisces (February 19 onward).

Its birth flowers are the violet (Viola), the common primrose (Primula vulgaris), and the Iris. Its birthstone is the amethyst, which symbolizes piety, humility, spiritual wisdom, and sincerity.

== Observances ==
This list does not necessarily imply either official status nor general observance.

=== Month-long ===
- In Catholic tradition, February is the Month of the Purification of the Blessed Virgin Mary.
- American Heart Month (United States)
- Black History Month (United States, Canada)
- National Bird-Feeding Month (United States)
- National Children's Dental Health Month (United States)
- Season for Nonviolence: January 30 – April 4 (International observance)
- Turner Syndrome Awareness Month (United States)
- LGBT History Month (United Kingdom, Ireland)

=== Non-Gregorian ===
(All Baha'i, Islamic, and Jewish observances begin at the sundown prior to the date listed, and end at sundown of the date in question unless otherwise noted.)

- List of observances set by the Bahá'í calendar
- List of observances set by the Chinese calendar
- List of observances set by the Hebrew calendar
- List of observances set by the Islamic calendar
- List of observances set by the Solar Hijri calendar

=== Movable ===
- Food Freedom Day (Canada): Date changes each year
- Safer Internet Day: First day of second week
- National Day of the Sun (Argentina): Date varies based on province

First Saturday

- Ice Cream for Breakfast Day

First Sunday

- Mother's Day (Kosovo)

First Week of February (first Monday, ending on Sunday)

- World Interfaith Harmony Week

First Monday

- Constitution Day (Mexico)
- National Frozen Yogurt Day (United States)

First Friday

- National Wear Red Day (United States)

Second Saturday

- International Purple Hijab Day

Second Sunday

- Autism Sunday (United Kingdom)
- Children's Day (Cook Islands, Nauru, Niue, Tokelau, Cayman Islands)
- Mother's Day (Norway)
- Super Bowl Sunday (United States)
- World Marriage Day

Second Monday

- Meal Monday (Scotland)

Second Tuesday

- National Sports Day (Qatar)

Week of February 22

- National Engineers Week (U.S.)

Third Monday

- Family Day (Canada) (provinces of British Columbia, Alberta, Saskatchewan, Manitoba, Ontario, New Brunswick and Prince Edward Island.)
- President's Day/Washington's Birthday (United States)

Third Thursday

- Global Information Governance Day

Third Friday

- Yukon Heritage Day (Canada)

Last Friday

- International Stand Up to Bullying Day

Last Saturday

- Open That Bottle Night

Last day of February

- Rare Disease Day

=== Fixed ===
- February 1
  - Abolition of Slavery Day (Mauritius)
  - Air Force Day (Nicaragua)
  - Federal Territory Day (Kuala Lumpur, Labuan and Putrajaya, Malaysia)
  - Heroes' Day (Rwanda)
  - Imbolc (Ireland, Scotland, Isle of Man, and some Neopagan groups in the Northern hemisphere)
  - Lammas (some Neopagan groups in the Southern hemisphere)
  - Memorial Day of the Republic (Hungary)
  - National Freedom Day (United States)
- February 2
  - Anniversary of Treaty of Tartu (Estonia)
  - Constitution Day (Philippines)
  - Day of Youth (Azerbaijan)
  - Feast of the Presentation of Jesus at the Temple (or Candlemas) (Western Christianity), and its related observances:
    - A quarter day in the Christian liturgical calendar (due to Candlemas) (Scotland)
    - Celebration of Yemanja (Candomblé)
  - Groundhog Day (United States and Canada)
    - Marmot Day (Alaska, United States)
  - Inventor's Day (Thailand)
  - National Tater Tot Day (United States)
  - World Wetlands Day
- February 3
  - Anniversary of The Day the Music Died (United States)
  - Communist Party of Vietnam Foundation Anniversary (Vietnam)
  - Day of the Virgin of Suyapa (Honduras)
  - Heroes' Day (Mozambique)
  - Martyrs' Day (São Tomé and Príncipe)
  - Setsubun (Japan)
  - Veterans' Day (Thailand)
- February 4
  - Day of the Armed Struggle (Angola)
  - Independence Day (Sri Lanka)
  - Rosa Parks Day (California and Missouri, United States)
  - World Cancer Day
- February 5
  - Crown Princess Mary's birthday (Denmark)
  - Kashmir Solidarity Day (Pakistan)
  - Liberation Day (San Marino)
  - National Weatherperson's Day (United States)
  - Runeberg's Birthday (Finland)
  - Unity Day (Burundi)
- February 6
  - International Day of Zero Tolerance to Female Genital Mutilation
  - Ronald Reagan Day (California, United States)
  - Sami National Day (Russia, Finland, Norway and Sweden)
  - Waitangi Day (New Zealand)
- February 7
  - Independence Day (Grenada)
- February 8
  - Parinirvana Day (some Mahayana Buddhist traditions, most celebrate on February 15)
  - Prešeren Day (Slovenia)
  - Propose Day
- February 9
  - National Pizza Day (United States)
  - St. Maroun's Day (Maronite Church, Eastern Orthodox Church, public holiday in Lebanon)
- February 10
  - Feast of St. Paul's Shipwreck (Public holiday in Malta)
  - Fenkil Day (Eritrea)
  - National Memorial Day of the Exiles and Foibe (Italy)
- February 11
  - 112 day (European Union)
  - Armed Forces Day (Liberia)
  - Day of Revenue Service (Azerbaijan)
  - Evelio Javier Day (Panay Island, the Philippines)
  - Feast day of Our Lady of Lourdes (Catholic Church), and its related observance:
    - World Day of the Sick (Roman Catholic Church)
  - Inventors' Day (United States)
  - National Foundation Day (Japan)
  - Youth Day (Cameroon)
- February 12
  - Darwin Day (International)
  - Georgia Day (Georgia (U.S. state))
  - International Day of Women's Health
  - Lincoln's Birthday (United States)
  - National Freedom to Marry Day (United States)
  - Red Hand Day (United Nations)
  - Sexual and Reproductive Health Awareness Day (Canada)
  - Union Day (Myanmar)
  - Youth Day (Venezuela)
- February 13
  - Black Love Day (United States)
  - Children's Day (Myanmar)
  - World Radio Day
- February 14
  - Statehood Day (Arizona, United States)
  - Statehood Day (Oregon, United States)
  - Presentation of Jesus at the Temple (Armenian Apostolic Church)
  - V-Day (movement) (International)
  - Valentine's Day (International)
    - Singles Awareness Day
- February 15
  - Candlemas (Eastern Orthodox Church)
  - International Duties Memorial Day (Russia, regional)
  - John Frum Day (Vanuatu)
  - Liberation Day (Afghanistan)
  - National Flag of Canada Day (Canada)
  - National I Want Butterscotch Day (United States)
  - Parinirvana Day (most Mahayana Buddhist traditions, some celebrate on February 8)
  - Serbia's National Day
  - Statehood Day (Serbia)
  - Susan B. Anthony Day (United States)
  - The ENIAC Day (Philadelphia, United States)
  - Total Defence Day (Singapore)
- February 16
  - Day of the Shining Star (North Korea)
  - Restoration of Lithuania's Statehood Day (Lithuania)
- February 17
  - Independence Day (Kosovo)
  - Random Acts of Kindness Day (United States)
  - Revolution Day (Libya)
- February 18
  - National Democracy Day (Nepal)
  - Dialect Day (Amami Islands, Japan)
  - Independence Day (Gambia)
  - Kurdish Students Union Day (Iraqi Kurdistan)
  - Wife's Day (Iceland)
- February 19
  - Armed Forces Day (Mexico)
  - Brâncuși Day (Romania)
  - Commemoration of Vasil Levski (Bulgaria)
  - Flag Day (Turkmenistan)
  - Shivaji Jayanti (Maharashtra, India)
- February 20
  - Day of Heavenly Hundred Heroes (Ukraine)
  - World Day of Social Justice
- February 21
  - International Mother Language Day
  - Language Movement Day (Bangladesh)
- February 22
  - Feast of the Chair of Saint Peter (Roman Catholic Church)
  - Independence Day (Saint Lucia)
  - Founder's Day (Saudi Arabia)
  - Founder's Day or "B.-P. day" (World Organization of the Scout Movement)
  - National Margarita Day (United States)
  - World Thinking Day (World Association of Girl Guides and Girl Scouts)
- February 23
  - Mashramani-Republic Day (Guyana)
  - Meteņi (Latvia)
  - National Banana Bread Day (United States)
  - National Day (Brunei)
  - Red Army Day or Day of Soviet Army and Navy in the former Soviet Union, also held in various former Soviet republics:
    - Defender of the Fatherland Day (Russia)
    - Defender of the Fatherland and Armed Forces day (Belarus)
  - Emperor's Birthday (Japan)
- February 24
  - Dragobete (Romania)
  - Engineer's Day (Iran)
  - Flag Day in Mexico
  - Independence Day (Estonia)
  - National Artist Day (Thailand)
  - Sepandārmazgān or "Women's Day" (Zoroastrian, Iran)
- February 25
  - Armed Forces Day (Dominican Republic)
  - Kitano Baika-sai or "Plum Blossom Festival" (Kitano Tenman-gū Shrine, Kyoto, Japan)
  - Meher Baba's birthday (followers of Meher Baba)
  - Memorial Day for the Victims of the Communist Dictatorships (Hungary)
  - National Day (Kuwait)
  - People Power Day (Philippines)
  - Revolution Day (Suriname)
  - Soviet Occupation Day (Georgia)
- February 26
  - Liberation Day (Kuwait)
  - Day of Remembrance for Victims of Khojaly massacre (Azerbaijan)
  - National Wear Red Day (United Kingdom)
  - Saviours' Day (Nation of Islam)
- February 27
  - Anosmia Awareness Day (International observance)
  - Doctors' Day (Vietnam)
  - International Polar Bear Day
  - Majuba Day (some Afrikaners in South Africa)
  - Marathi Language Day (Maharashtra, India)
  - Independence Day (Dominican Republic)
  - Anti-Bullying Day (Canada)
- February 28
  - Day of Remembrance for Victims of Massacres in Armenia (Armenia)
  - Andalusia Day (Andalusia, Spain)
  - Kalevala Day (Finland)
  - National Science Day (India)
  - Peace Memorial Day (Taiwan)
  - Teachers' Day (Arab states)
- February 29
  - Bachelor's Day (Ireland, United Kingdom)
  - National Frog Legs Day (United States)
