= List of active duty United States rear admirals =

US Navy active rear admirals

The shoulder stars, shoulder boards, and sleeve stripes of a U.S. Navy rear admiral (line officer)

This is a list of active duty rear admirals (two-star rear admiral, abbreviated RADM) serving in the United States Navy, United States Coast Guard, United States Public Health Service Commissioned Corps, National Oceanic and Atmospheric Administration Commissioned Officer Corps, and the United States Maritime Service, collected from publicly available and accessible information.

== Joint positions ==
=== Department of Defense ===
==== Defense Agencies ====
Position insignia	Position	Part of	Photo	Incumbent	Service branch
Missile Defense Agency	Director for Test, Missile Defense Agency (MDA)	Not applicable		Rear Admiral; Douglas L. Williams	U.S. Navy

==== Joint Staff ====
Position insignia	Position	Part of	Photo	Incumbent	Service branch
Joint Staff	Vice Director of the Joint Staff (VDJS)	Office of the Joint Staff		Rear Admiral; Paul C. Spedero Jr.	U.S. Navy
Joint Staff	Deputy Director for Special Operations and Counterterrorism (J-3), Joint Staff	(J-3) Operations Directorate		Rear Admiral; Brian H. Bennett	U.S. Navy
Joint Staff	Reserve Vice Director for Joint Force Development (J-7), Joint Staff	(J-7) Joint Force Development Directorate		Rear Admiral; Donald M. Plummer	U.S. Navy
Joint Staff	Deputy Director for Force Protection (J-8), Joint Staff	(J-8) Force Structure, Resources and Assessment Directorate		Rear Admiral; Thomas P. Moninger	U.S. Navy

==== Unified combatant commands ====
Position insignia	Position	Part of	Photo	Incumbent	Service branch
Central Command
U.S. Central Command	Director of Strategy, Plans, and Policy (J-5), U.S. Central Command (USCENTCOM)	Not applicable		Rear Admiral; Adan G. Cruz	U.S. Navy
Cyber Command
U.S. Cyber Command	Chief of Staff, U.S. Cyber Command (USCYBERCOM)	Not applicable		Rear Admiral; Dennis Velez	U.S. Navy
U.S. Cyber Command	Chief of Staff, U.S. Cyber Command (USCYBERCOM)	Not applicable		Rear Admiral; Kevin P. Lenox	U.S. Navy
U.S. Cyber Command	Director of Operations (J-3), U.S. Cyber Command (USCYBERCOM)	Not applicable		Rear Admiral; Ronald A. Foy	U.S. Navy
Indo-Pacific Command
U.S. Indo-Pacific Command	Director of Operations (J-3), U.S. Indo-Pacific Command (USINDOPACOM)	Not applicable		Rear Admiral; Erik J. Eslich	U.S. Navy
Northern Command
U.S. Northern Command North American Aerospace Defense Command	Director of Plans, Policy and Strategy (J-5), U.S. Northern Command (USNORTHCOM) and North American Aerospace Defense Command (NORAD)	Not applicable		Rear Admiral; Gregory D. Newkirk	U.S. Navy
Southern Command
U.S. Southern Command	Director of Operations (J-3), U.S. Southern Command (USSOUTHCOM)	Not applicable		Rear Admiral; Brendan C. McPherson	U.S. Coast Guard
Space Command
U.S. Space Command	Chief of Staff, U.S. Space Command (USSPACECOM)	Not applicable		Rear Admiral; Sean R. Bailey	U.S. Navy
Special Operations Command
U.S. Special Operations Command	Director of Operations (J-3), U.S. Special Operations Command (USSOCOM)	Not applicable		Rear Admiral; Jeromy B. Williams	U.S. Navy
Strategic Command
U.S. Strategic Command	Director of Intelligence (J-2), U.S. Strategic Command (USSTRATCOM)	Not applicable		Rear Admiral; Ralph R. Smith III	U.S. Navy
U.S. Strategic Command	Director of Plans and Policy (J-5), U.S. Strategic Command (USSTRATCOM)	Not applicable		Rear Admiral; Thomas R. Buchanan	U.S. Navy
Transportation Command
U.S. Transportation Command	Chief of Staff, U.S. Transportation Command (USTRANSCOM)	Not applicable		Rear Admiral; Kristin Acquavella	U.S. Navy
U.S. Transportation Command	Director of Strategic Plans, Policy, and Logistics (J-5/4), U.S. Transportation Command (USTRANSCOM)	Not applicable		Rear Admiral; Christopher D. Stone	U.S. Navy

==== Other joint positions ====
Position insignia	Position	Part of	Photo	Incumbent	Service branch
Sub-unified commands
Special Operations Command South	Commander, Special Operations Command South (SOCSOUTH)	U.S. Special Operations Command (USSOCOM); U.S. Southern Command (USSOUTHCOM)		Rear Admiral; Mark A. Schafer	U.S. Navy
Special activities
United States Congress Supreme Court of the United States	Attending Physician of the United States Congress and Supreme Court of the United States (SCOTUS)	Not applicable		Rear Admiral; Brian P. Monahan	U.S. Navy

== United States Navy and Marine Corps ==
=== Department of the Navy ===
Position insignia	Position	Part of	Photo	Incumbent	Service branch
Office of the Secretary
Office of the Assistant Secretary of the Navy (Financial Management and Comptroller) Office of the Deputy Chief of Naval Operations for Integration of Capabilities and Resources	Deputy Assistant Secretary of the Navy for Budget (FMB) and Director, Fiscal Management Division (N82), Office of the Chief of Naval Operations	Office of the Assistant Secretary of the Navy (Financial Management and Comptroller) (ASN (FM)); Office of the Chief of Naval Operations (OPNAV)		Rear Admiral; Benjamin G. Reynolds	U.S. Navy
Judge Advocate General's Corps, U.S. Navy	Deputy Judge Advocate General of the Navy (DJAG)	Judge Advocate General's Corps, U.S. Navy		Rear Admiral; Lia M. Reynolds	U.S. Navy

==== United States Navy ====
Position insignia	Position	Part of	Photo	Incumbent	Service branch
Office of the Chief of Naval Operations (staff directorates)
Office of the Chief of Naval Operations	Director, Military Personnel Plans and Policy Division (N13), Office of the Chief of Naval Operations	Office of the Deputy Chief of Naval Operations for Personnel, Manpower, and Training (N1)		Rear Admiral; Jennifer S. Couture	U.S. Navy
National Maritime Intelligence-Integration Office Office of Naval Intelligence	Director, National Maritime Intelligence-Integration Office (NMIO) and Commander, Office of Naval Intelligence (ONI)	Office of the Director of Naval Intelligence (DNI)		Rear Admiral; Michael A. Brookes	U.S. Navy
Office of the Chief of Naval Operations	Director, Maritime Operations (N2/N6), Office of the Chief of Naval Operations	Office of the Deputy Chief of Naval Operations for Information Warfare (N2/N6)		Rear Admiral; Bradley D. Dunham	U.S. Navy
Office of the Chief of Naval Operations	Director, Information Warfare (N99), Office of the Chief of Naval Operations	Office of the Chief of Naval Operations		Rear Admiral; Susan M. BryerJoyner	U.S. Navy
Office of the Chief of Naval Operations	Director, Strategic Integration (N2/N6T), Office of the Chief of Naval Operations	Office of the Deputy Chief of Naval Operations for Information Warfare (N2/N6)		Rear Admiral; Oliver T. Lewis	U.S. Navy
Office of the Chief of Naval Operations	Director, OPNAV Task Force 250 and Reserve Deputy for Operations, Plans, Strategy, and Warfighting Development (N3/N5/N7), Office of the Chief of Naval Operations	Office of the Deputy Chief of Naval Operations for Operations, Plans, Strategy, and Warfighting Development (N3/N5/N7); U.S. Navy Reserve (USNR)		Rear Admiral; Marc S. Lederer	U.S. Navy
Office of the Deputy Chief of Naval Operations for Fleet Readiness and Logistics (N4)	Reserve Deputy for Fleet Readiness and Logistics (N4R), Office of the Chief of Naval Operations	Office of the Deputy Chief of Naval Operations for Fleet Readiness and Logistics (N4); U.S. Navy Reserve (USNR)		Rear Admiral; Dennis E. Collins	U.S. Navy
Deputy Chief of Naval Operations for Integration of Capabilities and Resources	Special Assistant to the Deputy Chief of Naval Operations for Integration of Capabilities and Resources (N8)	Office of the Deputy Chief of Naval Operations for Integration of Capabilities and Resources (N8)		Rear Admiral; Nicholas R. Tilbrook	U.S. Navy
Office of the Deputy Chief of Naval Operations for Integration of Capabilities and Resources (N8)	Director, Assessment Division (N81), Office of the Chief of Naval Operations	Office of the Deputy Chief of Naval Operations for Integration of Capabilities and Resources (N8)		Rear Admiral; Douglas W. Sasse III	U.S. Navy
Office of the Chief of Naval Operations	Director, Warfare Integration (N9I), Office of the Chief of Naval Operations	Office of the Deputy Chief of Naval Operations for Warfighting Requirements and Capabilities (N9)		Rear Admiral; William R. Daly	U.S. Navy
Surface Warfare Division (N96), Office of the Chief of Naval Operations	Director, Surface Warfare Division (N96), Office of the Chief of Naval Operations	Office of the Deputy Chief of Naval Operations for Warfighting Requirements and Capabilities (N9)		Rear Admiral; Derek A. Trinque	U.S. Navy
Undersea Warfare Division (N97), Office of the Chief of Naval Operations	Director, Undersea Warfare Division (N97), Office of the Chief of Naval Operations	Office of the Deputy Chief of Naval Operations for Warfighting Requirements and Capabilities (N9)		Rear Admiral; Mark D. Behning	U.S. Navy
Office of the Chief of Naval Operations (direct reporting units)
	Director, Office of Warfighting Advantage (OWA)	Office of the Chief of Naval Operations (OPNAV)		Rear Admiral; C. Adam Kijek	U.S. Navy
Navy Reserve Forces Command	Commander, Navy Reserve Forces Command (CNRFC) and Deputy Commander, Navy Reserve Force (NRF)	U.S. Navy Reserve (USNR)		Rear Admiral; Luke A. Frost	U.S. Navy
Office of the Chief of Naval Operations	Chief of Legislative Affairs (CLA) and Special Assistant for Legislative Support (N09L)	Office of the Chief of Naval Operations (OPNAV)		Rear Admiral; Marc J. Miguez	U.S. Navy
Navy Medicine Bureau of Medicine and Surgery	Surgeon General of the United States Navy (SGN/N093) and Chief, Bureau of Medicine and Surgery (BUMED)	Office of the Chief of Naval Operations (OPNAV)		Rear Admiral; Rick Freedman; Acting	U.S. Navy
Navy Medicine Bureau of Medicine and Surgery	Deputy Surgeon General of the United States Navy (DSG), Deputy Chief, Bureau of Medicine and Surgery (BUMED) and Director, Medical Resources, Plans and Policy Division (N0931), Office of the Chief of Naval Operations	Office of the Chief of Naval Operations (OPNAV)		Rear Admiral; Matthew Case	U.S. Navy
U.S. Navy Medical Service Corps	Director, Medical Service Corps, U.S. Navy (MSC)	Bureau of Medicine and Surgery (BUMED)		Rear Admiral; Matthew Case	U.S. Navy
Bureau of Medicine and Surgery	Vice Chief, Bureau of Medicine and Surgery (BUMED), Reserve Policy and Integration	Office of the Chief of Naval Operations (OPNAV)		Rear Admiral; David M. Buzzetti	U.S. Navy
Type commands
Naval Air Force Atlantic	Commander, Naval Air Force Atlantic (COMNAVAIRLANT)	Naval Air Forces (NAVAIRFOR); U.S. Fleet Forces Command (USFF)		Rear Admiral; Richard T. Brophy Jr.	U.S. Navy
Naval Air Training Command	Chief of Naval Air Training (CNATRA)	Naval Air Forces (NAVAIRFOR)		Rear Admiral; Max G. McCoy Jr.	U.S. Navy
Naval Information Force Reserve	Commander, Naval Information Force Reserve (CNIFR) and Reserve Deputy Commander, Naval Information Forces (NAVIFOR)	Naval Information Forces (NAVIFOR); U.S. Navy Reserve (USNR)		Rear Admiral; Gregory K. Emery	U.S. Navy
	Commander, Fleet Information Warfare Command Pacific (FIWC Pacific) and Commander, Information Warfare Task Force, Pacific (TF-501)	Naval Information Forces (NAVIFOR); U.S. Pacific Fleet (USPACFLT)		Rear Admiral; Nicholas M. Homan	U.S. Navy
Submarine Group 10	Commander, Submarine Group 10 (COMSUBGRU Ten)	Submarine Force Atlantic (COMSUBLANT)		Rear Admiral; Robert E. Wirth	U.S. Navy
Submarine Force, U.S. Pacific Fleet	Commander, Submarine Force, U.S. Pacific Fleet (COMSUBPAC)	Submarine Forces (SUBFOR); U.S. Pacific Fleet (USPACFLT)		Rear Admiral; Christopher J. Cavanaugh	U.S. Navy
Naval Surface Force Atlantic	Commander, Naval Surface Force Atlantic (COMNAVSURFLANT)	Naval Surface Forces (NAVSURFOR); U.S. Fleet Forces Command (USFF)		Rear Admiral; Christopher D. Alexander	U.S. Navy
Operating forces (and subordinated units)
U.S. Fleet Forces Command	Vice Commander, U.S. Fleet Forces Command (USFF)	Not applicable		Rear Admiral; Kenneth R. Blackmon	U.S. Navy
U.S. Fleet Forces Command	Director, Maritime Operations, U.S. Fleet Forces Command (USFF)	Not applicable		Rear Admiral; Martin J. Muckian	U.S. Navy
Military Sealift Command	Commander, Military Sealift Command (MSC)	U.S. Transportation Command (USTRANSCOM); U.S. Fleet Forces Command (USFF); Office of the Assistant Secretary of the Navy (Research, Development and Acquisition) (ASN (RDA))		Rear Admiral; Benjamin R. Nicholson	U.S. Navy
Navy Expeditionary Combat Command	Commander, Navy Expeditionary Combat Command (NECC)	U.S. Fleet Forces Command (USFF)		Rear Admiral; Bradley J. Andros	U.S. Navy
U.S. Naval Forces Europe-Africa	Vice Commander, U.S. Naval Forces Europe-Africa (CNE-CNA)	U.S. European Command (USEUCOM); U.S. Africa Command (USAFRICOM)		Rear Admiral; Scott W. Ruston	U.S. Navy
U.S. Pacific Fleet	Reserve Deputy Commander, U.S. Pacific Fleet (USPACFLT)	U.S. Indo-Pacific Command (USINDOPACOM); U.S. Navy Reserve (USNR)		Rear Admiral; Joaquin J. Martinez de Pinillos	U.S. Navy
U.S. Naval Forces Southern Command U.S. Fourth Fleet	Commander, U.S. Naval Forces Southern Command (COMUSNAVSO) and Commander, U.S. Fourth Fleet (C4F)	U.S. Southern Command (USSOUTHCOM)		Rear Admiral; Carlos A. Sardiello	U.S. Navy
Shore establishment (three-star Echelon II commands)
Program Executive Office, Aircraft Carriers	Program Executive Officer for Aircraft Carriers (PEO Carriers)/Deputy Portfolio Acquisition Executive Maritime for Aircraft Carriers	Naval Sea Systems Command (NAVSEA)		Rear Admiral; Casey J. Moton	U.S. Navy
Program Executive Office, Attack Submarines	Program Executive Officer for Attack Submarines (PEO SSN)	Naval Sea Systems Command (NAVSEA)		Rear Admiral; Jonathan E. Rucker	U.S. Navy
Program Executive Office, Tactical Aircraft Programs	Program Executive Officer for Tactical Aircraft Programs (PEO(T))	Naval Air Systems Command (NAVAIR)		Rear Admiral; Joseph B. Hornbuckle III	U.S. Navy
Program Executive Office, Unmanned Aviation and Strike Weapons	Program Executive Officer for Unmanned Aviation and Strike Weapons (PEO(U&W))	Naval Air Systems Command (NAVAIR)		Rear Admiral; Anthony E. Rossi	U.S. Navy
Naval District Washington Joint Task Force – National Capital Region	Commandant, Naval District Washington (NDW) and Deputy Commander, Joint Task Force – National Capital Region (JTF-NCR)	Navy Installations Command (CNIC)		Rear Admiral; David J. Faehnle	U.S. Navy
Navy Region Mid-Atlantic	Commander, Navy Region Mid-Atlantic (CNRMA)	Navy Installations Command (CNIC)		Rear Admiral; Stephen D. Barnett	U.S. Navy
Navy Region Hawaii	Commander, Navy Region Hawaii (CNRH)	Navy Installations Command (CNIC)		Rear Admiral; Brad J. Collins	U.S. Navy
Shore establishment (two-star Echelon II commands)
Naval Education and Training Command	Commander, Naval Education and Training Command (NETC)	Not applicable		Rear Admiral; Gregory C. Huffman	U.S. Navy
Naval Education and Training Command	Deputy Commander, Naval Education and Training Command Force Development (NETC-FD)	Not applicable		Rear Admiral; Robert C. Nowakowski	U.S. Navy
Navy Recruiting Command	Commander, Navy Recruiting Command (NRC)	Naval Education and Training Command (NETC)		Rear Admiral; James P. Waters III	U.S. Navy
Naval Facilities Engineering Systems Command	Commander, Naval Facilities Engineering Systems Command (NAVFAC), Chief of Civil Engineers, U.S. Navy, Deputy Commander for Facilities and Environment, Navy Installations Command (CNIC) and Deputy Commander for Facilities and Environment, Marine Corps Installations Command (MCICOM)	Office of the Deputy Commandant, Installations and Logistics (DC I&L) (Note: as Deputy Commander for Facilities and Environment, Marine Corps Installations Command (MCICOM))		Rear Admiral; Jeffrey J. Kilian	U.S. Navy
Naval Information Warfare Systems Command	Commander, Naval Information Warfare Systems Command (NAVWAR)	Not applicable		Rear Admiral; Kurt J. Rothenhaus	U.S. Navy
Naval Safety Command	Commander, Naval Safety Command (NAVSAFECOM)	Not applicable		Rear Admiral; Daniel P. Martin	U.S. Navy
Naval Supply Systems Command	Commander, Naval Supply Systems Command (NAVSUP) and Chief, Supply Corps, U.S. Navy	Not applicable		Rear Admiral; Kenneth W. Epps	U.S. Navy
Naval War College	President of the Naval War College (NWC)	Not applicable		Rear Admiral; Darryl L. Walker	U.S. Navy
In transit
				Rear Admiral; Joseph F. Cahill III	U.S. Navy

== Other services ==
=== Department of Homeland Security ===
==== United States Coast Guard ====
Position insignia	Position	Part of	Photo	Incumbent	Service branch
Office of the Deputy Commandant for Operations
Deputy Commandant for Operations	Deputy Commandant for Operations (DCO)	Not applicable		Rear Admiral; Douglas M. Schofield; Acting	U.S. Coast Guard
	Director of Staff, Coast Guard Headquarters (CGHQ)	Not applicable		Rear Admiral; Douglas M. Schofield; Acting	U.S. Coast Guard
Office of the Deputy Commandant for Operations	Deputy for Operations Policy and Intelligence (DCO-D/CG-2)	Office of the Deputy Commandant for Operations (DCO)		Rear Admiral; David C. Barata	U.S. Coast Guard
Assistant Commandant for Response Policy and Operations Integration (CG‐5R/CG-3)	Assistant Commandant for Response Policy and Operations Integration (CG‐5R/CG-3)	Office of the Deputy Commandant for Operations (DCO)		Rear Admiral; M. Megan Dean	U.S. Coast Guard
Assistant Commandant for Prevention Policy (CG-5P)	Assistant Commandant for Prevention Policy (CG-5P)	Office of the Deputy Commandant for Operations (DCO)		Rear Admiral; Wayne R. Arguin Jr.	U.S. Coast Guard
U.S. Coast Guard Reserve	Assistant Commandant for Reserve (CG-R) and Director, U.S. Coast Guard Reserve (USCGR)	Office of the Deputy Commandant for Operations (DCO)		Rear Admiral; Tiffany G. Danko	U.S. Coast Guard
Office of the Deputy Commandant for Systems
Deputy Commandant for Systems	Deputy Commandant for Systems (DCS)	Not applicable		Rear Admiral; Chad L. Jacoby	U.S. Coast Guard
Office of the Deputy Commandant for Personnel Readiness
	Deputy Commandant for Personnel Readiness (DPR) and Chief Human Capital Officer, U.S. Coast Guard	Not applicable		Rear Admiral; Charles E. Fosse	U.S. Coast Guard
Assistant Surgeon General	Chief Medical Officer, U.S. Coast Guard	Office of the Deputy Commandant for Personnel Readiness (DPR)		Rear Admiral; Paul Jung	U.S. Public Health Service
Coast Guard Atlantic Area
Coast Guard Atlantic Area U.S. Coast Guard East District	Deputy Commander, Coast Guard Atlantic Area (LANTAREA) and Commander, U.S. Coast Guard East District	Not applicable		Rear Admiral; John C. Vann	U.S. Coast Guard
U.S. Coast Guard Northeast District	Commander, U.S. Coast Guard Northeast District	Coast Guard Atlantic Area (LANTAREA)		Rear Admiral; Michael E. Platt	U.S. Coast Guard
U.S. Coast Guard Great Lakes District	Commander, U.S. Coast Guard Great Lakes District	Coast Guard Atlantic Area (LANTAREA)		Rear Admiral; Jonathan P. Hickey	U.S. Coast Guard
Coast Guard Pacific Area
Coast Guard Pacific Area	Commander, Coast Guard Pacific Area (PACAREA) and Commander, Defense Force West	Not applicable		Rear Admiral; Joseph R. Buzzella; Acting	U.S. Coast Guard
U.S. Coast Guard Oceania District	Commander, U.S. Coast Guard Oceania District	Coast Guard Pacific Area (PACAREA)		Rear Admiral; Sean P. Regan	U.S. Coast Guard
In transit
				Rear Admiral; Carola J. List	U.S. Coast Guard

=== Department of Health and Human Services ===
Position insignia	Position	Part of	Photo	Incumbent	Service branch
Assistant Surgeon General	Director, Office of Laboratory Operations and Applied Science (OLOAS) and Chief Veterinarian Officer	Food and Drug Administration (FDA)		Rear Admiral; Kis Robertson Hale	U.S. Public; Health Service
National Heart, Lung, and Blood Institute	Scientific Director, National Heart, Lung, and Blood Institute (NHLBI)	National Institutes of Health (NIH)		Rear Admiral; Richard W. Childs	U.S. Public; Health Service

==== United States Public Health Service Commissioned Corps ====
Position insignia	Position	Part of	Photo	Incumbent	Service branch
Office of the Surgeon General
Deputy Surgeon General of the United States	Deputy Surgeon General of the United States (DSG)	U.S. Public Health Service (USPHS)		Vacant	U.S. Public; Health Service

=== Department of Justice ===
Position insignia	Position	Part of	Photo	Incumbent	Service branch
Federal Bureau of Prisons
Federal Bureau of Prisons	Assistant Director, Health Services Division, Federal Bureau of Prisons (FBP)	Not applicable		Rear Admiral; Chris A. Bina	U.S. Public; Health Service

=== Department of Commerce ===
==== National Oceanic and Atmospheric Administration Commissioned Officer Corps ====
Position insignia	Position	Part of	Photo	Incumbent	Service branch
Office of the Director
Director, NOAA Commissioned Officer Corps	Director, NOAA Commissioned Officer Corps and Assistant Administrator, NOAA Office of Marine and Aviation Operations (OMAO)	National Oceanic and Atmospheric Administration (NOAA)		Rear Admiral; Chad M. Cary	NOAA Commissioned Officer Corps

=== Department of Transportation ===
==== United States Maritime Service ====
Position insignia	Position	Part of	Photo	Incumbent	Service branch
Office of the Superintendent
U.S. Merchant Marine Academy	Superintendent of the United States Merchant Marine Academy (USMMA)	Not applicable		Rear Admiral; Anthony J. Ceraolo	U.S. Maritime Service

== List of pending appointments ==
=== Retaining current position/position unannounced ===
These are flag officers awaiting promotion to rear admiral while retaining their current position or do not have their position announced yet.

Photo	Name	Service branch	Status and date
Nominations (October 2025)
	Rear Admiral (lower half); Michael E. Campbell	U.S. Coast Guard	Nomination sent to the Senate; 23 October 2025
	Rear Admiral (lower half); Russell E. Dash	U.S. Coast Guard	Nomination sent to the Senate; 23 October 2025
	Rear Admiral (lower half); Amy B. Grable	U.S. Coast Guard	Nomination sent to the Senate; 23 October 2025
	Rear Admiral (lower half); Matthew W. Lake	U.S. Coast Guard	Nomination sent to the Senate; 23 October 2025
	Rear Admiral (lower half); Ralph R. Little	U.S. Coast Guard	Nomination sent to the Senate; 23 October 2025
	Rear Admiral (lower half); Jeffrey K. Randall	U.S. Coast Guard	Nomination sent to the Senate; 23 October 2025
	Rear Admiral (lower half); Wilborne E. Watson	U.S. Coast Guard	Nomination sent to the Senate; 23 October 2025

== See also ==
- List of active duty United States four-star officers
- List of active duty United States three-star officers
- List of active duty United States Army major generals
- List of active duty United States Marine Corps major generals
- List of active duty United States Air Force major generals
- List of active duty United States Space Force general officers
- List of active duty United States senior enlisted leaders and advisors
- List of current United States National Guard major generals
- List of United States Army four-star generals
- List of United States Marine Corps four-star generals
- List of United States Navy four-star admirals
- List of United States Air Force four-star generals
- List of United States Coast Guard four-star admirals
