= Robert Levy =

Robert Levy may refer to:

== Films ==
- Robert Levy (producer) (1888–1959), American film producer significant in establishing blacks as successful actors
- Robert L. Levy (film producer), American film producer

== Others ==
- Robert I. Levy (1924–2003), American psychiatrist and anthropologist
- Robert A. Levy (born 1941), American lawyer, pundit, and entrepreneur
- Robert L. Levy (cardiologist) (1888–1974), American cardiologist and professor
- Robert Levy (author) (born 1974), American author
- Robert Levy (physician) (1937–2000), American physician known for research on the lipid hypothesis
- Robert Lévy, French Jewish physician involved in World War I and World War II
- Robert D. Loevy (born 1935), American political-science professor and journalist

== See also ==
- Bob Levy (disambiguation)
