= Basil M. Rifkind =

American physician

- Born: Basil Mair Rifkind; 1934; Glasgow
- Died: 22 June, 2008 (aged 73); Washington, D.C.
- Occupation: Physician
- Spouse: Margaret Reacha Raisman (m. 1960)

Basil Mair Rifkind (1934 – 22 June 2008) was an American physician known for conducting influential research that demonstrated lowering blood cholesterol reduces cardiovascular disease risk.

== Career ==
Rifkind was born in Glasgow to Lithuanian Jewish parents. He studied at the University of Glasgow and obtained his MD in 1955. He practiced internal medicine at Glasgow Royal Infirmary from 1960 to 1971. In 1971, he was appointed a medical officer under Robert Levy at the National Heart, Lung, and Blood Institute’s Lipid Metabolism Branch. He became chief and director of the Lipid Research Clinics (LRC) Program that conducted population research on lipid metabolism. The program included the famous Coronary Primary Prevention Trial (CPPT) in 1984, a large patient randomized trial that tested the lipid hypothesis. The trial provided conclusive evidence that lowering blood cholesterol reduces cardiovascular disease risk. The trial has been described as the "first study to demonstrate conclusively" that lowering cholesterol levels reduced the rate of heart attacks in a group of middle-aged men.

In 1984, Rifkind was co-chairman of the National Institutes of Health's Consensus Conference on Lowering Blood Cholesterol to Prevent Heart Disease. He was a Fellow to the Royal College of Physicians.

== Death ==
Rifkind had Parkinson's disease. He died on 22 June 2008, aged 73.

== Selected publications ==
- Hyperlipidemia: Diagnosis and Therapy (1977)
- Ten-Year Mortality from Cardiovascular Disease in Relation to Cholesterol Level among Men with and Without Preexisting Cardiovascular Disease (1990)
- The Lipid Research Clinics Coronary Primary Prevention Trial: Design, Results, and Implications (1991)
- Clinical Trials of Reducing Low-Density Lipoprotein Concentrations (1998)
