= Naval Information Warfare Systems Command Program Executive Offices =

Development and acquisition organizations of the U.S. Navy

Program Executive Offices (PEO) Naval Information Warfare Systems Command
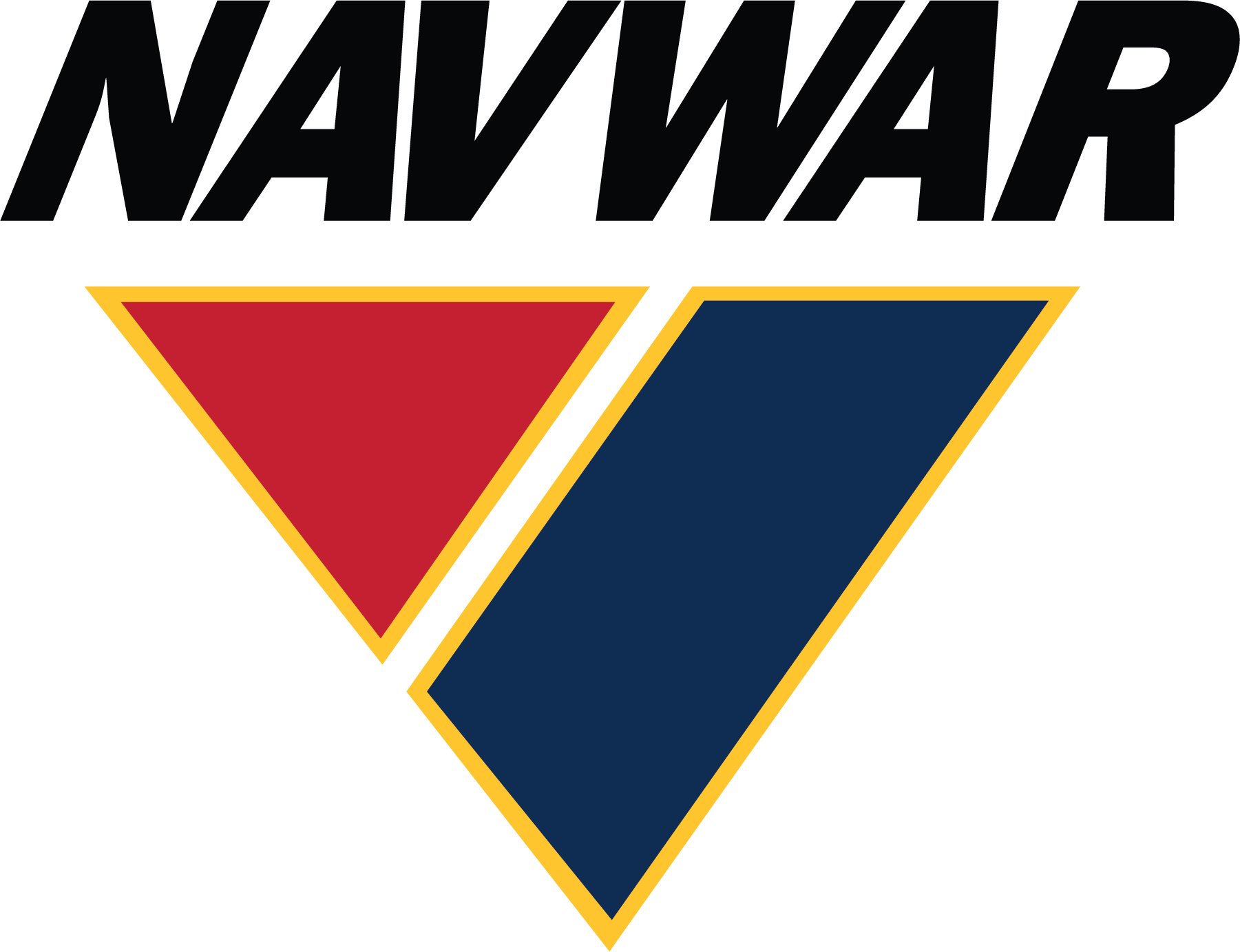
- Seal of the Naval Information Warfare Systems Command
- Country: United States
- Branch: United States Navy
- Part of: Naval Information Warfare Systems Command
- Website: navwar.navy.mil/About

The Naval Information Warfare Systems Command Program Executive Offices (PEOs) are organizations responsible for the prototyping, procurement, and fielding of C4ISR (Command, Control, Communications, Computers, Intelligence, Surveillance and Reconnaissance), business information technology and space systems. Their mission is to develop, acquire, field and sustain affordable and integrated state of the art equipment for the Navy.

The Naval Information Warfare Systems Command is organizationally aligned to the Chief of Naval Operations. As part of its mission, NAVWAR provides support, manpower, resources, and facilities to its aligned Program Executive Offices (PEOs). The Program Executive Offices are responsible for the execution of major defense acquisition programs. The PEOs are organizationally aligned to the Assistant Secretary of the Navy for Research, Development and Acquisition (ASN(RDA)). The Naval Information Warfare PEOs operate under NAVWAR policies and procedures.

There are three Naval Information Warfare Systems Program Executive Offices.

== Program Executive Office Command, Control, Communications, Computers and Intelligence (PEO C4I) ==
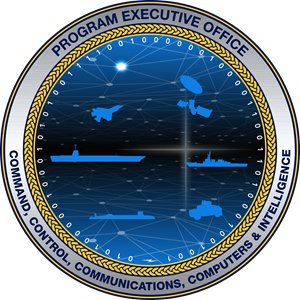
PEO C4I emblem

PEO C4I provides the Navy and Marine Corps with affordable, integrated and interoperable information warfare capability.

The Program Executive Officer for PEO C4I is Dr. William Luebke, who assumed this post in October 2023.

PEO C4I comprises eleven major program offices:

- PMA/PMW 101: Multifunctional Information Distribution System Program
- PMW 120: Battlespace Awareness and Information Operations Program
- PMW 130: Cybersecurity Program
- PMW 150: Command and Control Systems Program
- PMW 160: Tactical Networks Program
- PMW/A 170: Communications and GPS Navigation Program
- PMW 740: International C4I Integration Program
- PMW 750: Carrier and Air Integration Program
- PMW 760: Ship Integration Program
- PMW 770: Undersea Communications and Integration Program
- PMW 790: Tactical Shore and Expeditionary Integration Program

== Program Executive Office for Digital and Enterprise Services (PEO Digital) ==
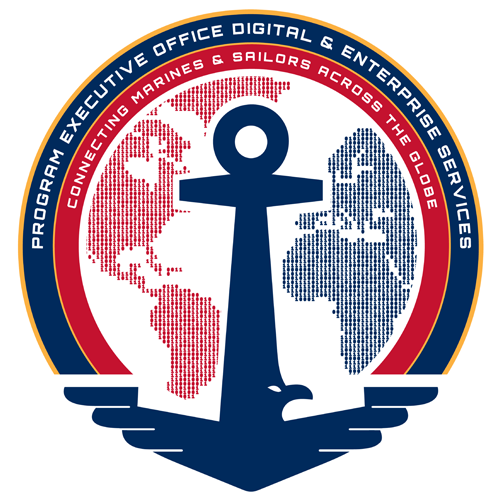
PEO Digital emblem

PEO Digital provides the Navy and Marine Corps with a portfolio of enterprise-wide information technology (IT) programs designed to enable common business processes and provide standard IT capabilities. PEO Digital is digitally transforming systems to evolve and deliver modern capabilities and technologies.

The Program Executive Officer for PEO Digital is Louis Koplin (acting).

PEO Digital was established in May 2020 following the disestablishment of the Program Executive Office for Enterprise Information Systems. The PEO EIS offices relating to networks, enterprise services and digital infrastructure were transitioned to PEO Digital. The program offices relating to manpower, logistics and other business solutions were transitioned to PEO Manpower, Logistics and Business Solutions.

PEO Digital comprises five major program offices:

- PMW 205: Naval Enterprise Network (NEN) Program
- PMW 260: Special Networks and Intelligence Mission Applications (SNIMA) Program
- PMW 270: Navy Commercial Cloud Services (NCCS) Program
- PMW 280: Special Access Programs (SAP)
- PMW 290: Enterprise IT Strategic Sourcing (EITSS) Program

== Program Executive Office Manpower, Logistics and Business Solutions (PEO MLB) ==
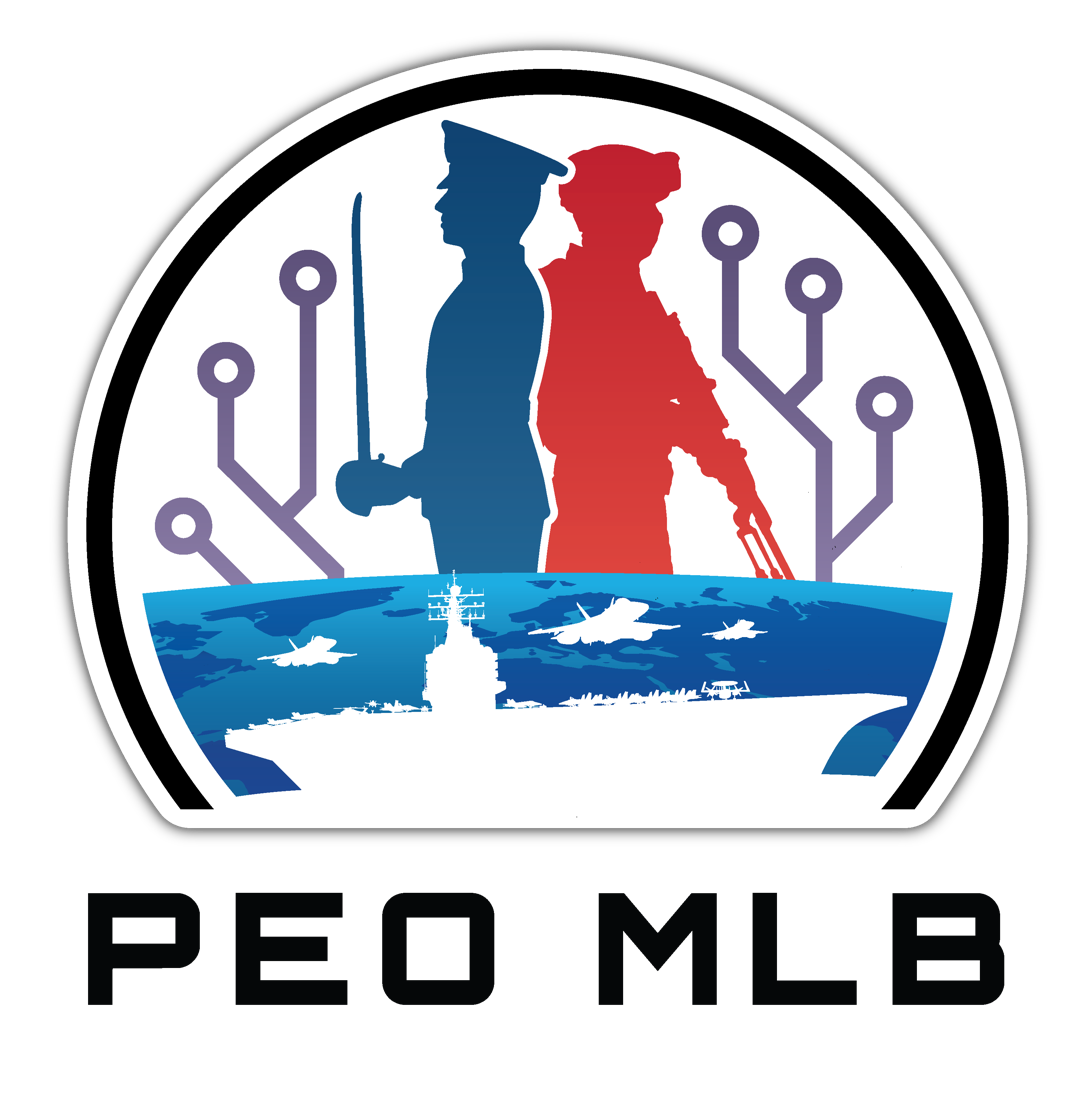
PEO MLB emblem

PEO MLB provides the Navy and Marine Corps with a portfolio of information technology programs designed to enable common business processes at sea and in the field.

The Program Executive Officer for PEO MLB is Christine Rodriguez. The Executive Director for PEO MLB is Mary Thoms.

PEO MLB was established in May 2020 following the disestablishment of the Program Executive Office for Enterprise Information Systems. The PEO EIS offices relating to networks, enterprise services and digital infrastructure were transitioned to PEO Digital. The program offices relating to manpower, logistics and other business solutions were transitioned to PEO Manpower, Logistics and Business Solutions.

PEO MLB comprises five major program offices:

- PMW 220: Navy Enterprise Business Solutions (Navy EBS) Program
- PMW 230: Logistics Integrated Information Solutions - Marine Corps (GCSS-MC) Program
- PMW 240: Sea Warrior Program
- PMW 250: Enterprise Systems and Services (E2S) Program
- PMW 444: Navy Maritime Maintenance Enterprise Solution (NMMES) Technical Refresh (TR) Program Program

== See also ==
Other SYSCOM program executive offices (PEO)

- PEOs of Naval Sea Systems Command (NAVSEA)
- PEOs of Naval Air Systems Command (NAVAIR)

Related systems commands

- Marine Corps Systems Command
- Naval Air Systems Command
- Naval Facilities Engineering Systems Command
- Naval Information Warfare Systems Command
- Naval Sea Systems Command
- Naval Supply Systems Command
