= Gary H. Gibbons =

American cardiologist

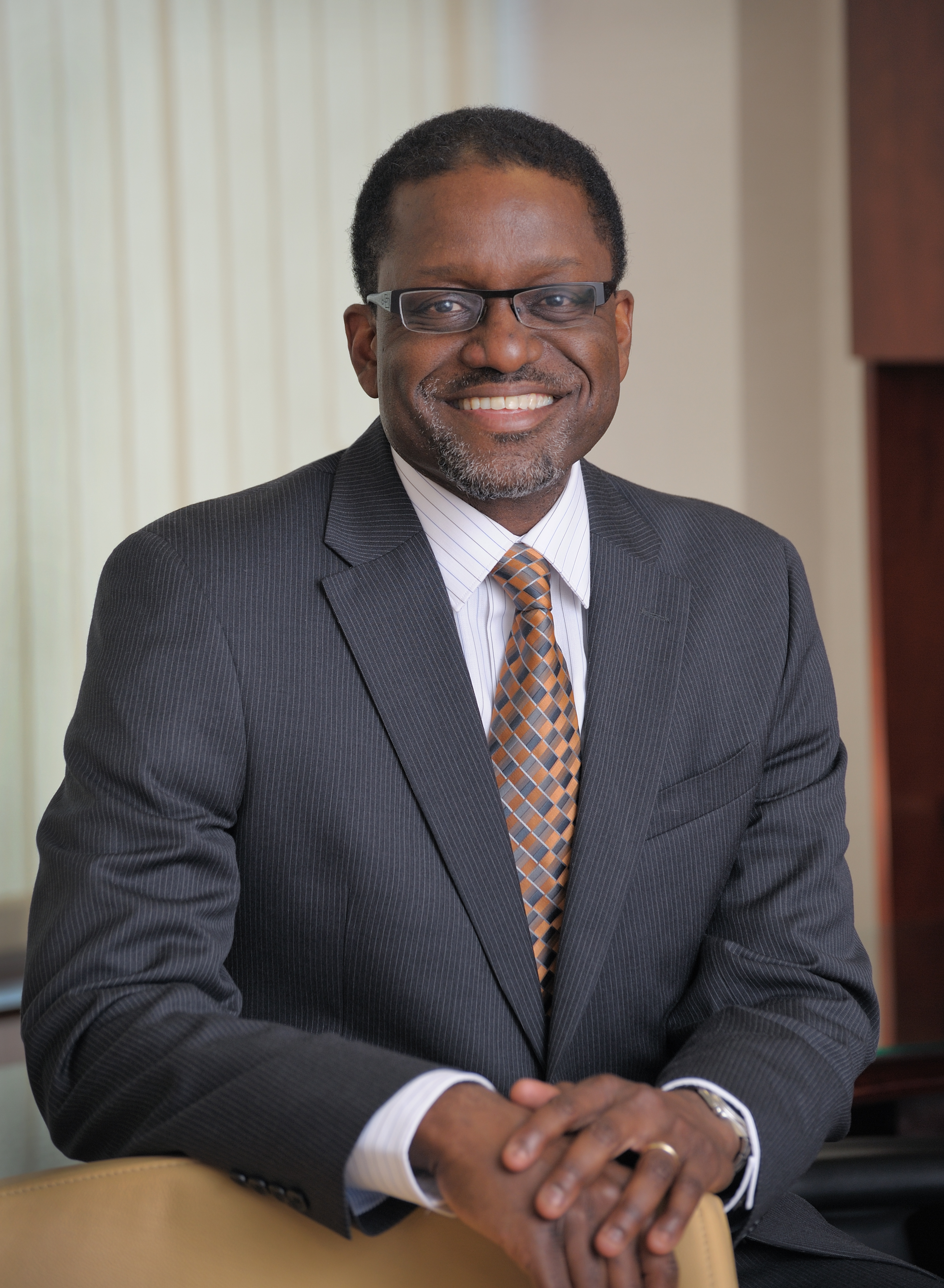
- Born: October 4, 1956 (age 70); Philadelphia, Pennsylvania, U.S.
- Education: Princeton University (BS); Harvard University (MD)
- Occupation: Director of the National Heart, Lung, and Blood Institute
- Medical career
- Field: Cardiology
- Sub-specialties: Cardiovascular health of minorities

Gary Hugh Gibbons is an American cardiologist and former director of the National Heart, Lung, and Blood Institute (NHLBI).

== Early life and education ==
Gibbons was born on October 4, 1956, in Philadelphia, Pennsylvania, the youngest of three children born to schoolteacher parents. He grew up in the Philadelphia neighborhood of Germantown. He has credited his mother for inspiring him to be committed to public health. He received his undergraduate degree from Princeton University in 1978 and later graduated from Harvard Medical School. He then completed his residency and cardiology fellowship at Brigham and Women's Hospital.

== Career ==
Gibbons served on the faculty of Stanford University from 1990 to 1996, and on the faculty of Harvard Medical School from 1996 to 1999. In 1999, he joined the Morehouse School of Medicine, where he founded the Cardiovascular Research Institute, which is known for its research on the cardiovascular health of minorities. He then served as its director until August 13, 2012, when he became the director of the National Heart, Lung, and Blood Institute.

== Honors and awards ==
In 2007, Gibbons was named a member of the Institute of Medicine. Throughout his career, Gibbons has also received several honors, including the selection as a Robert Wood Johnson Foundation Minority Faculty Development Awardee, selection as a Pew Foundation Biomedical Scholar, receipt of the American Heart Association (AHA) Research Achievement Award and receipt of a Samuel J. Heyman Service to America Medal (Sammie).
