= Bob Levy =

Bob Levy may refer to:

- Bob Levy (Canadian politician), Canadian politician and judge
- Bob Levy (comedian) (born 1962), stand-up comedian and radio personality
- Bob Levy (New Jersey politician) (born 1947), former mayor of Atlantic City, New Jersey

== See also ==
- Robert Levy (disambiguation)
