= World Marriage Day =

American observance in February

- Significance: Marriage
- Date: Second Sunday of February
- 2025 date: February 9
- 2026 date: February 8
- 2027 date: February 14
- 2028 date: February 13
- Frequency: Annual
- Started by: Worldwide Marriage Encounter

World Marriage Day is an observance sponsored by American organization Worldwide Marriage Encounter, associated with the Catholic Marriage Encounter movement and observed on second Sunday of February each year.

Its purpose is declared to be: "World Marriage Day honors husband and wife as the foundation of the family, the basic unit of society. It salutes the beauty of their faithfulness, sacrifice and joy in daily married life."

== See also ==
- Familialism
- Marriage
