= Global Information Governance Day =

Global awareness day

- Date: Third Thursday in February
- 2025 date: February 20
- 2026 date: February 19
- 2027 date: February 18
- 2028 date: February 17
- Frequency: annual

Global Information Governance Day (GIGD) is a day that occurs on the third Thursday in February. The purpose of Global Information Governance Day is to raise the awareness of information governance. The annual observance was started by Garth Landers, Tamir Sigal, and Barclay T. Blair in 2012.

Information governance is the enforcement of desirable behavior in the creation, use, archiving, and deletion of information held by an organization. Gartner Inc., an information technology research and advisory firm, defines information governance as the specification of decision rights and an accountability framework to encourage desirable behavior in the valuation, creation, storage, use, archival and deletion of information. It includes the processes, roles, standards and metrics that ensure the effective and efficient use of information in enabling an organization to achieve its goals.

February is Information Governance Month, coordinated by the American Health Information Management Association.

The celebration is coordinated and promoted by information governance experts.

== History ==
Records management deals with the retention and disposition of records. A record can either be a physical, tangible object, or digital information such as a database, application data, and e-mail. The lifecycle was historically viewed as the point of creation to the eventual disposal of a record. As content generation exploded in recent decades, and regulations and compliance issues increased, traditional records management failed to keep pace. A more comprehensive platform for managing records and information became necessary to address all phases of the lifecycle, which led to the advent of information governance.

Information governance (IG) goes beyond retention and disposition to include privacy, access controls, and other compliance issues. In electronic discovery, or e-discovery, electronically stored information is searched for relevant data by attorneys and placed on legal hold. IG includes consideration of how this content is held and controlled for e-discovery, and also provides a platform for defensible disposition and compliance. Additionally, metadata often accompanies electronically stored data and can be of great value to the enterprise if stored and managed correctly.

With all of these additional considerations that go beyond traditional records management, IG emerged as a platform for organizations to define policies at the enterprise level, across multiple jurisdictions. IG then also provides for the enforcement of these policies into the various repositories of information, data, and records.

Information governance was given national recognition in November 2011 with a directive from President Obama to overhaul current records management processes within the government to encompass current needs more comprehensively.

Information governance has been a growing trend, even becoming the theme of the annual ARMA International Conference in 2012. While Records Managers are becoming aware of IG, there is still little awareness among many organizations. Global Information Governance Day was established in 2013 to raise this awareness.

== See also ==
- National Archives
- Records Management
- Enterprise content management
- Information technology governance
- Information security governance
