= National Freedom to Marry Day =

Non-official holiday promoting same-sex marriage

- Date: February 12
- Next time: 12 February 2026
- Frequency: annual

National Freedom to Marry Day is a non-official United States holiday held annually on February 12 to promote same-sex marriage. The holiday was founded in 1998 by Lambda Legal, a gay rights advocacy law firm based out of Washington, DC.

The most notable National Freedom to Marry Day was February 12, 2004, when, following a directive from San Francisco mayor Gavin Newsom to his county clerk, the City and County of San Francisco began issuing marriage licenses to same-sex couples. On February 10, Newsom asked the clerk's office to make the changes on the "forms and documents used to apply for and issue marriage licenses… in order to provide [them] on a non–discriminatory basis."

February 12, the same day of Abraham Lincoln's Birthday, is a day for people to think about love and equality. Many LGBTQ+ people want to get married this day in order to commemorate their love, just two days before Valentine's Day. "Tying the Knot" can be shown by tying a knot around trees, lamp posts, signs, or anywhere else that can be easily seen.

== See also ==
- Freedom to Marry
- Evan Wolfson
