= Black Love Day =

Annual celebration that takes place February 13

Black Love Day is an annual celebration that takes place February 13. Complementary to Valentine's Day (February 14), Black Love Day is meant to focus on self-love, connection, and preservation of culture, particularly in the African American community, rather than romantic love.

== History ==
Black Love Day was first celebrated in Washington, D.C., in 1993. It was conceived by community organizer Ayo Handy-Kendi who, after seeing the film Malcolm X in the theatre, felt compelled by a higher power (called "the creator") to do something to foster unity.

In 1994, after the death of her son to violence, Handy-Kendi added a "relationship ceremony" to the observance, in which someone chooses to forgive another who wronged them, or apologize for having wronged someone else.

== Observance ==
The symbol of Black Love Day is the akoma (heart), which represents love, unity, and patience in Asante culture. Participants greet each other with the phrase nya akoma (get a heart, be patient).

Each year the celebration has a different theme, but is always based on five tenets: "love toward the Creator, love for self, love for the family, love within the Black community and love for Black people."

== See also ==
- Black Day (South Korea)
- Black History Month
- Kwanzaa
