= Virginids =

Meteor shower

The Virginids are a meteor shower. There are many major and minor meteor shower streams that occur during the Virginid Complex, including the Alpha Virginids, Gamma Virginids, Eta Virginids, Theta Virginids, Iota Virginids, Lambda Virginids, Mu Virginids, Pi Virginids, and Psi Virginids, and March Virginids, emanating mostly from the constellation Virgo between February and May. Collectively, the shower normally lasts from late January to mid-April and into early May, peaking in March and April, with one to two meteors per hour on average. The main radiant shifts southeastwards from central Leo in late January to central Virgo near Spica in mid-May.

== Alpha Virginids ==
The Alpha Virginids occur between March 10 and May 6, peaking between April 7 and April 18, with five to ten meteors per hour. They were first detected in 1895.

== Gamma Virginids ==
The North and South Gamma Virginids are a slow-moving minor meteor shower stream, although the May Gamma Virginids and Daytime Gamma Virginids are faster-moving. The source of the North and South Gamma Virginid streams are thought to be 2002 FC and 2003 BD44, respectively. It usually spans from April 5 to April 21, peaking on April 14 and April 15, with less than five meteors per hour. It was first discovered in 1895.

== Eta Virginids ==
The Eta Virginids occur between February 24 and March 27, peaking around March 18 with only one to two meteors per hour. The shower was first detected in 1961.

== Theta Virginids ==
The Theta Virginids occur between March 10 and April 21, peaking around March 20, with only one to three meteors per hour. The shower was first observed in 1850 and identified in 1948.

== Iota Virginids ==
The Iota Virginids are a minor daytime meteor shower stream.

== Lambda Virginids ==
The Lambda Virginids are a minor meteor shower stream.

== Mu Virginids ==
The Mu virginids are a minor meteor shower stream, visible in April and early May. The shower typically lasts from April 1 to May 12, peaking around April 24 to April 25. Its radiant is near Libra, peaking with seven to ten meteors per hour.

== Pi Virginids ==
The Pi Virginids occur between February 13 and April 8, peaking between March 3 and March 9, with two to five meteors per hour. The shower was first observed in 1908 and identified in 1948.

== Psi Virginids ==
The Psi Virginids are a minor daytime meteor shower stream.

== March Virginids ==
The March Virginids are a minor meteor shower stream; the source of the Northern March Virginids is thought to be 1998 SJ70. The Beta Leonids, lasting from February 14 to April 25, peaking around March 20 with three to four meteors per hour, were also referred to as the "March Virginids".
