= World Day of Social Justice =

International observance for social justice

World Day of Social Justice (Social Justice Equality Day) is an international day recognizing the need to promote social justice, which includes efforts to tackle issues such as poverty, exclusion, gender inequality, unemployment, human rights, and social protections.

== Overview ==
Many organizations, including the UN, American Library Association (ALA), and the International Labour Organization, make statements on the importance of social and present plans for greater social justice by tackling poverty, social and economic exclusion and unemployment. The United Nations General Assembly has decided to observe 20 February annually, approved on 26 November 2007 and starting in 2009, as the World Day of Social Justice.

The Declaration focuses on guaranteeing fair outcomes for all through employment, social protection, social dialogue, and fundamental principles and rights.

== Teaching Social Justice Day ==
Topics for teaching students about the need for social justice include (but are not limited to) childhood poverty, global citizenship, human rights, and sustainable development. A series of lessons are available by country with the United Nations and other programs. Oxfam's food for thought power point which shows students the global food system that then has the opportunity for students to share their thoughts and experiences. The lesson plans and collections available are for students of all ages.

== See also ==
- List of minor secular observances
- Disability and poverty
