= Robert Levy (physician) =

American physician and pioneer of preventive cardiology

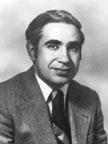
- Born: 1937; Bronx, New York
- Died: 2000 (aged 62–63); Manhattan
- Occupation: Physician

Robert I. Levy (1937–2000) was an American physician and pioneer of preventive cardiology best known for his research that established the link between low-density lipoprotein cholesterol and heart disease.

== Biography ==
Levy was born in Bronx, New York in 1937. He graduated from Cornell University and Yale Medical School. He completed a residency in internal medicine at Yale-New Haven Hospital. He joined the National Heart, Lung, and Blood Institute (NHLBI) in 1963 of which he was director from 1975 to 1981. In 1973, he became director of NHLBI's Division of Heart and Vascular Diseases where he managed a network of Lipid Research Clinics.

He was one of the first researchers to separate cholesterol into high-density and low-density lipoproteins, which became known as the good and bad cholesterol. In 1981, he became vice president and dean of the Tufts University School of Medicine and was a professor of medicine at the Columbia University College of Physicians and Surgeons. He served as president of the Sandoz Research Institute from 1988 to 1992. He was president of the American Home Products Corporation Wyeth-Ayerst Research Division.

He died aged 63 of pancreatic cancer at Columbia-Presbyterian Medical Center in Manhattan.

== Coronary Primary Prevention Trial ==
He was the Project Officer of the Coronary Primary Prevention Trial, which was one of the first clinical trials to demonstrate that lowering LDL-C reduces coronary heart disease incidence. That study has been described as laying the groundwork for further research on lipid lowering agents such as statins.

== Selected publications ==
- Hyperlipidemia: Diagnosis and Therapy (with Basil M. Rifkind, 1977)
- Nutrition, Lipids, and Coronary Heart Disease: A Global View (with Basil M. Rifkind and Barbara H. Dennis, 1979)
