= Robert L. Levy (cardiologist) =

American cardiologist (1888–1974)

Robert L. Levy (October 14, 1888 – November 23, 1974) was an American cardiologist, professor emeritus of clinical medicine at Columbia University's College of Physicians and Surgeons and director of the department of cardiology at the Columbia-Presbyterian Medical Center.

== Biography ==
Levy was born on October 14, 1888, in New York City. He graduated from Yale University in 1909 and from Johns Hopkins Medical School in 1913. Levy directed the cardiology department at Columbia-Presbyterian Medical Center. He served twice as President of New York Academy of Medicine, president of New York Heart Association, president of the American Clinical and Climatological Society, chairman of the Subcommittee on Cardiovascular Disease of the National Research Council. The New York Times called Levy a "heart pioneer".
