= National Wear Red Day =

Heart disease awareness annual event

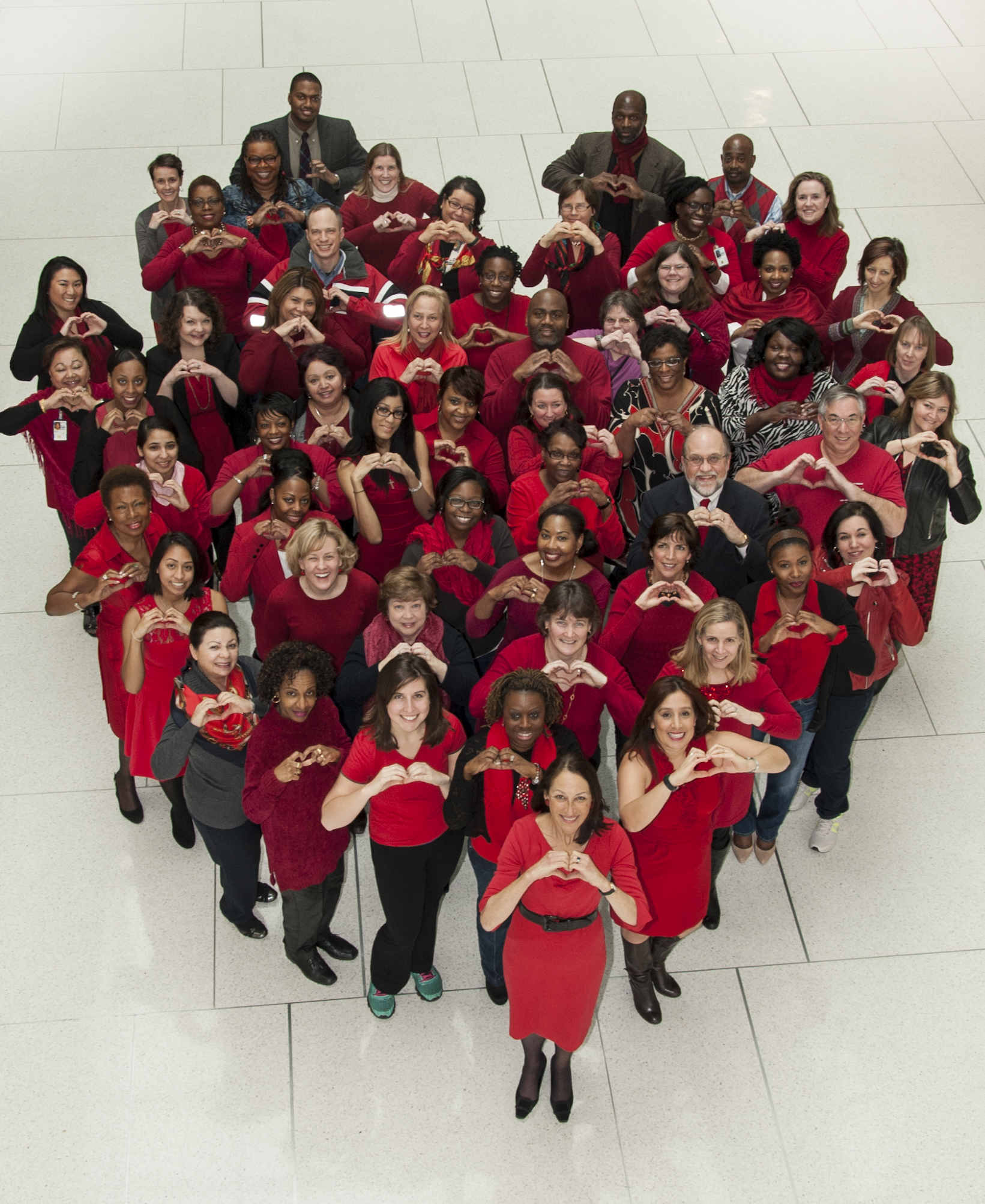
United States Food and Drug Administration employees celebrating Wear Red Day

National Wear Red Day is a day in February when many people wear red to show their support for the awareness of heart disease.

== In the US ==
In the US, National Wear Red Day occurs on the first Friday in February each year.

National Wear Red Day is sponsored by The Heart Truth, under the auspices of the National Heart, Lung, and Blood Institute—part of the National Institutes of Health, U.S. Department of Health and Human Services. The Heart Truth is a national awareness campaign for women about heart disease. The Heart Truth created and introduced the Red Dress as the national symbol for women and heart disease awareness in 2002. The goal is to warn women of their #1 health threat.

== In the UK ==
In the UK, Wear Red Day is held on the first Friday of February. It's organised by Yorkshire-based charity Children's Heart Surgery Fund to raise awareness of congenital heart disease.
