= Naval Air Systems Command Program Executive Offices =

Development and acquisition organizations of the U.S. Navy

Program Executive Offices (PEO) Naval Air Systems Command
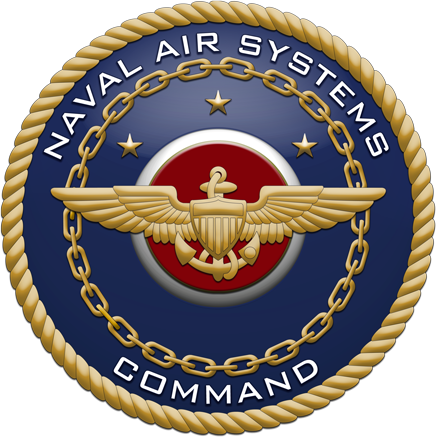
- Seal of the Naval Air Systems Command
- Country: United States
- Branch: United States Navy
- Part of: Naval Air Systems Command
- Website: navair.navy.mil/organization

The Naval Air Systems Command Program Executive Offices (PEOs) are organizations responsible for the prototyping, procurement, and fielding of naval air equipment. Their mission is to develop, acquire, field and sustain affordable and integrated state of the art equipment for the Navy.

The Naval Air Systems Command is organizationally aligned to the Chief of Naval Operations. As part of its mission, NAVAIR provides support, manpower, resources, and facilities to its aligned Program Executive Offices (PEOs). The Program Executive Offices are responsible for the execution of major defense acquisition programs. The PEOs are organizationally aligned to the Assistant Secretary of the Navy for Research, Development and Acquisition (ASN(RDA)). The Naval Aviation PEOs are co-located with the Naval Air Systems Command at the Naval Air Station Patuxent River, MD, and operate under NAVAIR policies and procedures.

There are five Naval Air Systems Program Executive Offices.

== Program Executive Office, Air Anti-Submarine Warfare, Assault & Special Mission (PEO(A)) ==
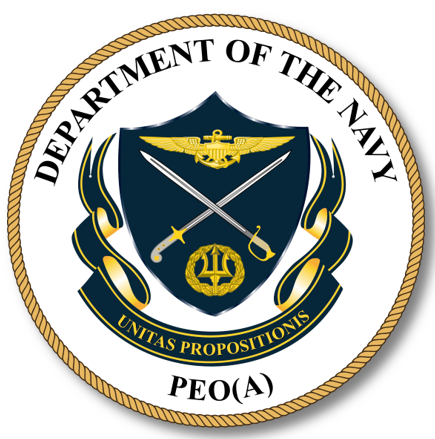
PEO (Air Anti-Submarine Warfare, Assault and Special Mission) emblem

PEO(A) provides the Navy and Marine Corps with helicopters, special mission aircraft, and aviation anti-submarine warfare equipment and aircraft.

The Program Executive Officer for PEO(A) is Brigadier General David C. Walsh, USMC, a post which he assumed in June 2024.

PEO(A) comprises nine major program offices:

- PMA-207: Tactical Airlift Program
- PMA-261: H-53 Helicopters Program
- PMA-264: Air Anti-Submarine Warfare Systems Program
- PMA-271: Airborne Strategic Command, Control and Communications Program
- PMA-274: Presidential Helicopters Program
- PMA-275: V-22 Joint Program
- PMA-276: H1 Program
- PMA-290: Maritime Patrol and Reconnaissance Aircraft (MPRA) Program
- PMA-299: H-60 Multi-mission Helicopter Program

== Program Executive Office, Tactical Aircraft Programs (PEO(T)) ==
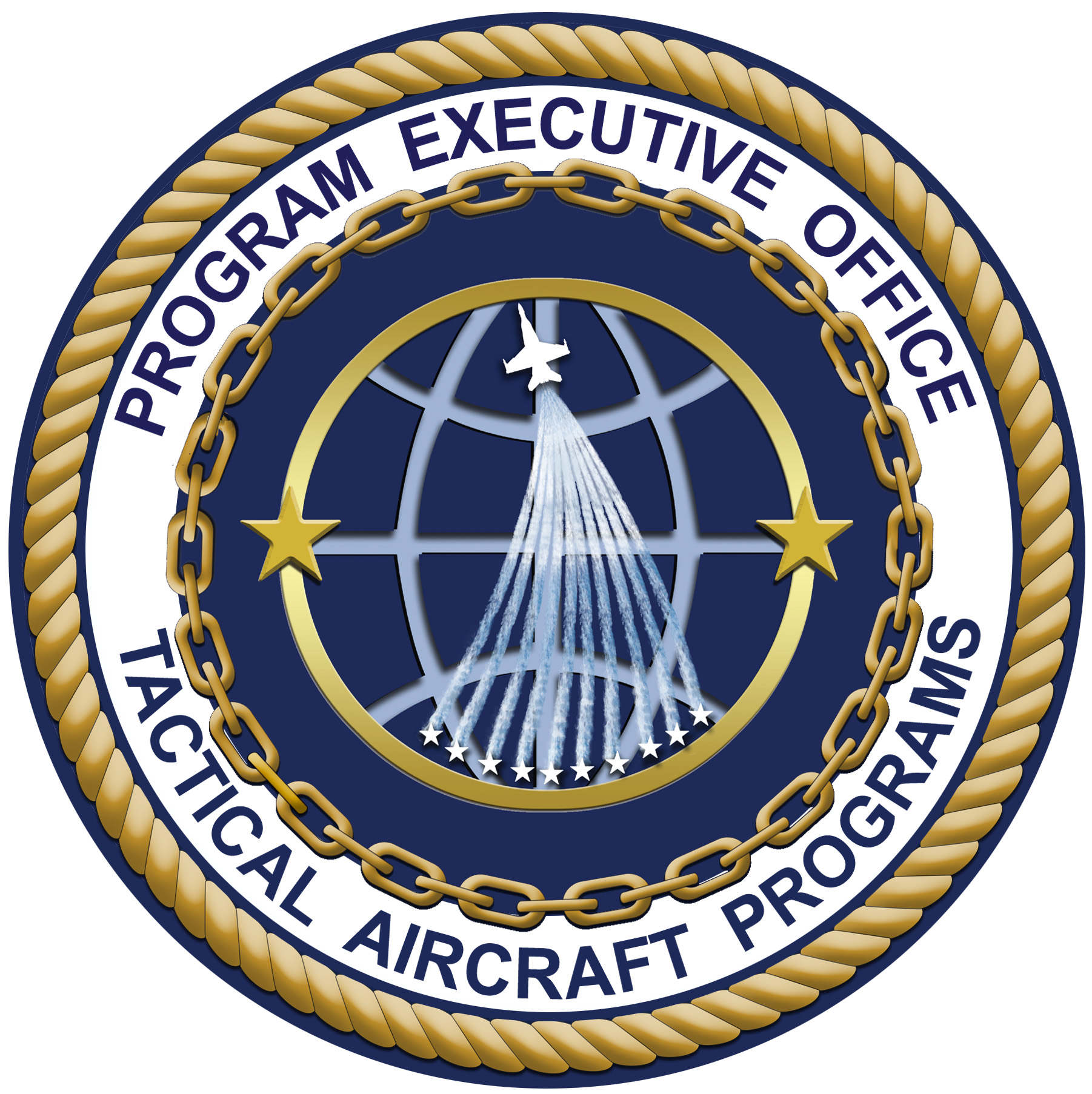
PEO(T) emblem

PEO(T) provides the Navy and Marine Corps with full life-cycle support of naval aviation aircraft, weapons and systems.

The Program Executive Officer for PEO(T) is Rear Admiral John S. Lemmon, USN, a post which he assumed in September 2022.

PEO(T) comprises thirteen major program offices:

- PMA-205: Naval Aviation Training Systems and Ranges Program
- PMA-209: Air Combat Electronics Program
- PMA-226: Specialized and Proven Aircraft Program
- PMA-213: Naval Air Traffic Management Systems Program
- PMA-231: E-2/C-2 Airborne Command and Control Systems Program
- PMA-234: Airborne Electronic Attack Systems Program
- PMA-251: Aircraft Launch and Recovery Equipment Program
- PMA-257: AV-8B Program
- PMA-259: Air-To-Air Missiles Program
- PMA-265: F/A-18 and EA-18G Program
- PMA-272: Advanced Tactical Aircraft Protection Systems Program
- PMA-273: Naval Undergraduate Flight Training Systems Program
- PMWA-170: Navy Communications and GPS Navigation Program

== Program Executive Office, Unmanned Aviation and Strike Weapons (PEO(U&W)) ==
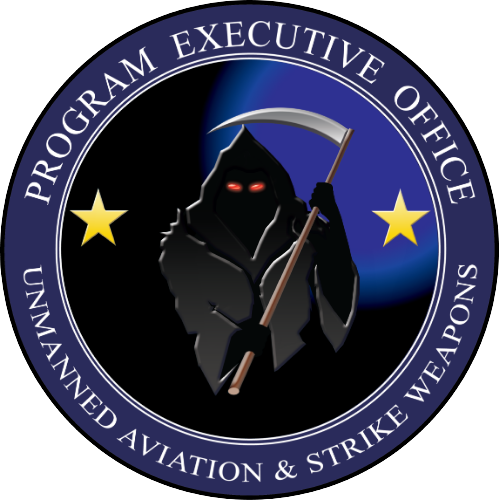
PEO (Unmanned Aviation and Strike Weapons) emblem

PEO(U&W) provides the Navy and Marine Corps with unmanned aircraft, weapons and target systems.

The Program Executive Officer for PEO(U&W) is Rear Admiral Stephen R. Tedford, USN, a post which he assumed in May 2022.

PEO(U&W) comprises eleven major program offices:

- PMA-201: Precision Strike Weapons Program
- PMA-202: Aircrew Systems Program
- PMA-208: Aerial Targets Program
- PMA-242: Direct and Time Sensitive Strike Program
- PMA-262: Persistent Maritime Unmanned Aircraft Systems Program
- PMA-260: Common Aviation Support Equipment Program
- PMA-263: Navy and Marine Corps Small Tactical Unmanned Aircraft Systems Program
- PMA-266: Multi-Mission Tactical Unmanned Aerial Systems (UAS) Program
- PMA-268: Unmanned Carrier Aviation Program
- PMA-280: Tomahawk Weapons System Program
- PMA-281: Strike Planning and Execution Systems Program

== Program Executive Office, F-35 Lightning II (PEO(F-35)) ==
PEO (F-35 Lightning II) emblem

PEO(F-35), also known as the Joint Strike Fighter Program, is tasked with defining affordable next generation strike aircraft weapon systems for the Navy, Air Force, Marines, and allies.

The Program Executive Officer for PEO(F-35) is Lieutenant General Michael J. Schmidt, USAF.

== Products ==
NAVAIR operations can also be subdivided into five product areas:

- Fixed Wing
- Rotorcraft
- Weapons
- Unmanned
- Aviation Systems

== See also ==
Other SYSCOM program executive offices (PEO)

- PEOs of Naval Sea Systems Command (NAVSEA)
- PEOS of Naval Information Warfare Systems Command (NAVWAR)

Related systems commands

- Marine Corps Systems Command
- Naval Sea Systems Command
- Naval Information Warfare Systems Command
- Naval Facilities Engineering System Command
- Naval Supply Systems Command
