= Naval Sea Systems Command Program Executive Offices =

Development and acquisition organizations of the U.S. Navy

Program Executive Offices (PEO) Naval Sea Systems Command
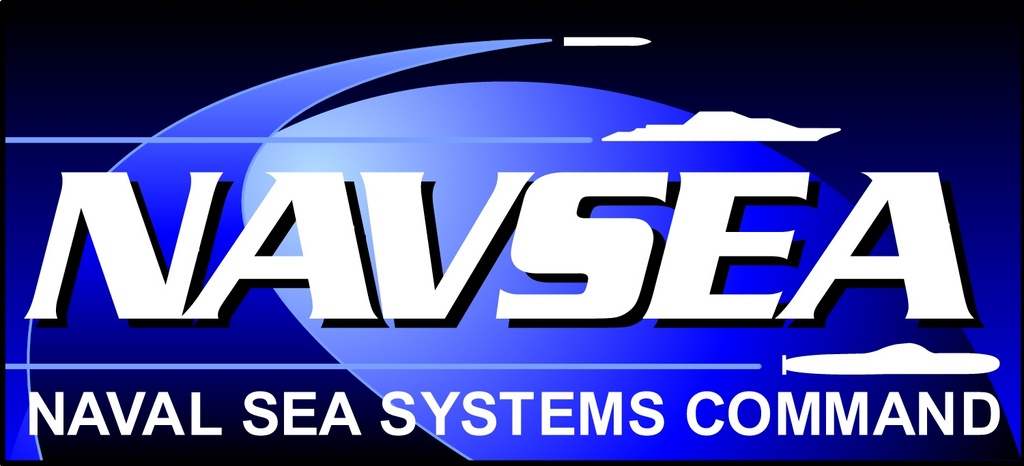
- Seal of the Naval Sea Systems Command
- Country: United States
- Branch: United States Navy
- Part of: Naval Sea Systems Command
- Website: navsea.navy.mil/About

The Naval Sea Systems Command Program Executive Offices (PEOs) are responsible for the development and acquisition of naval platforms and weapons systems. Their mission is to develop, acquire, field and sustain affordable and integrated state of the art equipment for the Navy and Marine Corps.

The Naval Sea Systems Command is organizationally aligned to the chief of naval operations. As part of its mission, NAVSEA provides support, manpower, resources, and facilities to its aligned Program Executive Offices (PEOs). The Program Executive Offices are responsible for the execution of major defense acquisition programs. The PEOs are organizationally aligned to the Assistant Secretary of the Navy for Research, Development and Acquisition (ASN(RDA)). The Naval Sea Systems Command PEOs operate under NAVSEA policies and procedures.

The Commander for Naval Sea Systems Command is Vice Admiral James P. Downey, USN, a post which he assumed in January 2024.

There are seven Naval Sea Systems Command Program Executive Offices.

== Program Executive Office Aircraft Carriers (PEO Carriers) ==
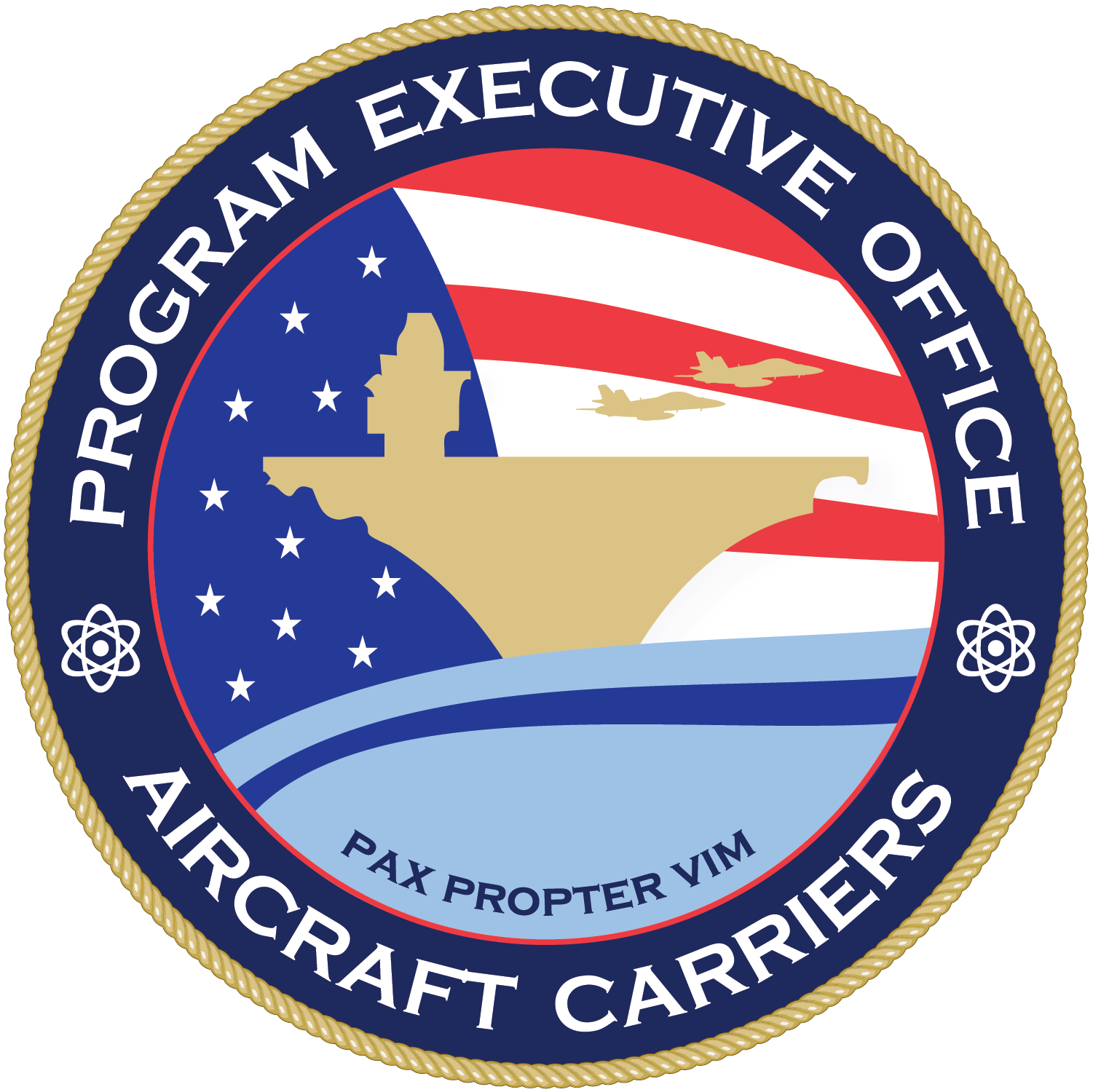
PEO (Aircraft Carriers) emblem

PEO (Carriers) provides the Navy with design, construction and delivery, and life-cycle support of all aircraft carriers and the integration of systems into aircraft carriers.

The Program Executive Officer for PEO (Carriers) is Rear Admiral Casey J. Moton, USN, a post which he assumed in July 2023.

PEO (Carriers) comprises four major program offices:

- PMS 312: In-Service Aircraft Carrier Program
- PMS 378: New Construction Aircraft Carrier Program
- PMS 368: Aircraft Carrier Inactivation & Disposal Program
- CPA: Carrier Planning Activity

== Program Executive Office Attack Submarines (PEO SSN) ==
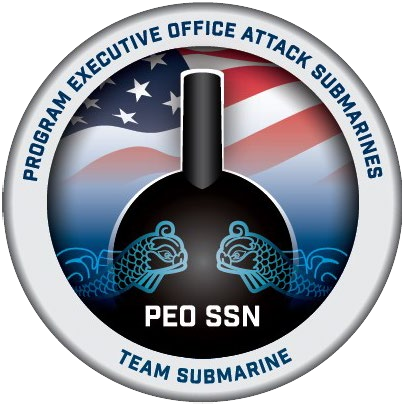
PEO (Attack Submarines) emblem

PEO (Attack Submarines) provides the Navy with the design, construction, delivery, and conversion of submarines and advanced undersea and anti-submarine systems, with its primary focus being delivery of the Virginia-class submarine.

The Program Executive Officer for PEO (Attack Submarines) is Rear Admiral Jonathan E. Rucker, USN, a post which he assumed in May 2022.

PEO (Submarines) comprises seven major program offices:

- PMS 401: Submarine Acoustic Systems Program
- PMS 404: Undersea Weapons Program
- PMS 415: Undersea Defensive Warfare Systems Program
- PMS 425: Submarine Combat and Weapons Control Program
- PMS 435: Submarine Electromagnetic Systems Program
- PMS 450: VIRGINIA Class Program
- PMS 485: Maritime Surveillance Systems Program

== Program Executive Office Integrated Warfare Systems (PEO IWS) ==
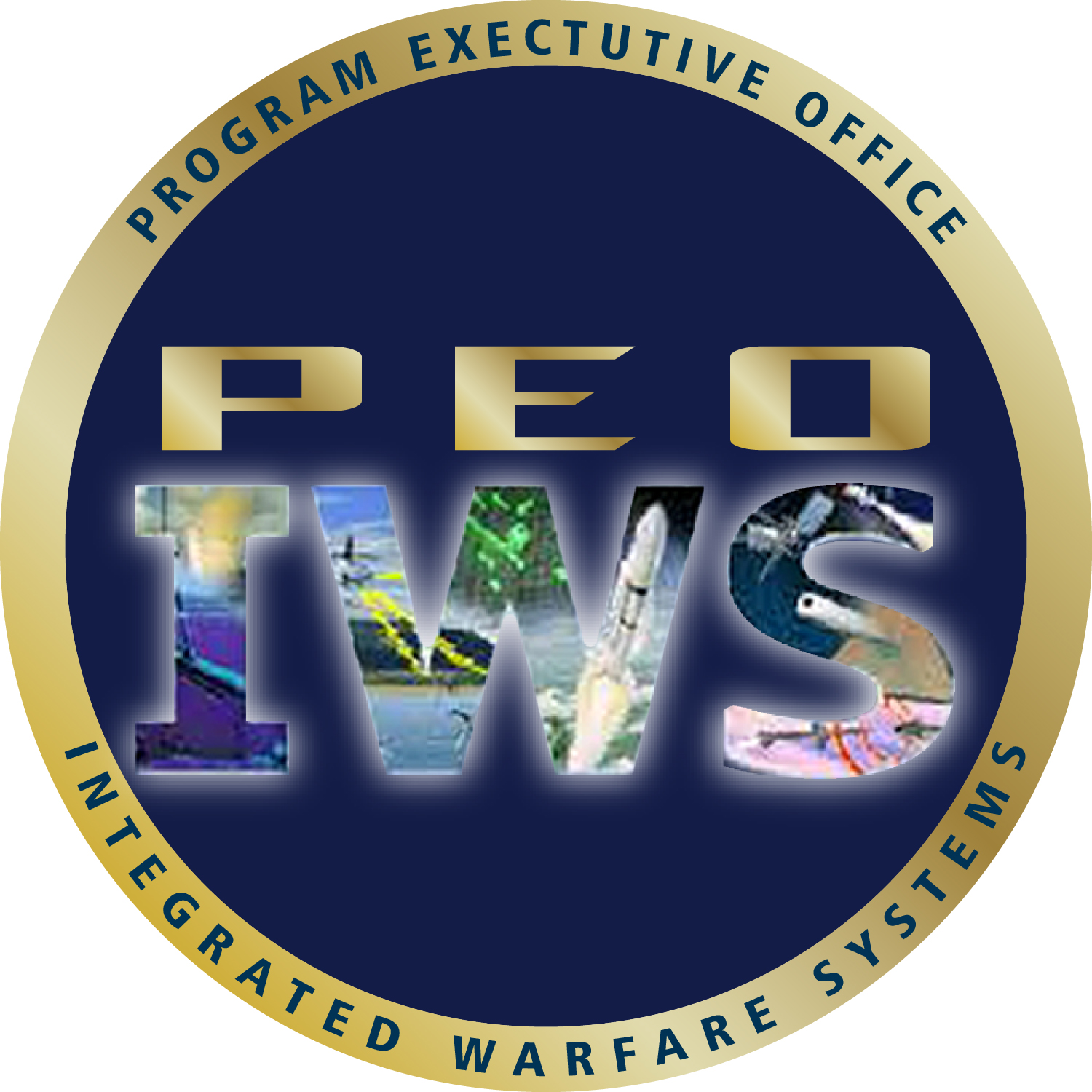
PEO (Integrated Warfare Systems) emblem

PEO (IWS) provides the Navy with design, construction, and delivery of combat systems for surface ships.

The Program Executive Officer for PEO (IWS) is Rear Admiral Thomas J. Dickinson, USN, a post which he assumed in July 2024.

PEO (IWS) comprises five integrated combat systems major program offices, and seven product major program offices:

- Integrated combat systems major program offices
  - IWS 1.0: AEGIS Program
  - IWS 4.0: International Programs & Foreign Military Sales (FMS) Program
  - IWS 9.0: Zumwalt Integrated Combat System Program
  - IWS 80: Ship Self Defense System (SSDS) Program, Littoral Combat Ship Combat Systems Program, and Unmanned Systems Program
- Product major program offices
  - IWS 2.0: Above Water Sensors and Lasers Program
  - IWS 3.0: Surface Ship Weapons Program
  - IWS 5.0: Undersea Systems Program
  - IWS 6.0: Command and Control Program
  - IWS 11.0: Terminal Defense Systems Program
  - IWS 12.0: NATO Seasparrow Program
  - IWS ?.?: Systems of Systems Engineering / Integrated Fire (SoS/IF) Program

== Program Executive Office Ships (PEO Ships) ==
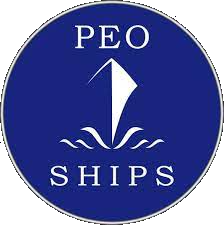
PEO (Ships) emblem

PEO (Ships) provides the Navy with acquisition and complete life-cycle support for all non-nuclear surface ships.

The Program Executive Officer for PEO (Ships) is Rear Admiral Brian A. Metcalf, USN, a post which he assumed in May 2025.

PEO (Ships) comprises seven major program offices:

- PMS 300: U.S. Navy and Foreign Military Sales (FMS) Boats and Craft
- PMS 317: LPD 17 Program
- PMS 320: Electric Ships Office (ESO)
- PMS 325: Support Ships, Boats & Craft Program
- PMS 373: Polar Security Cutter Program
- PMS 377: Amphibious Warfare Program
- PMS 385: Strategic & Theater Sealift Program
- PMS 400D: DDG 51 Program - Arleigh Burke class destroyer
- PMS 500: DDG 1000 Program - Zumwalt class destroyer
- PMS 460: DDG (X) Program - Guided Missile destroyer

== Program Executive Office Strategic Submarines (PEO SSBN) ==
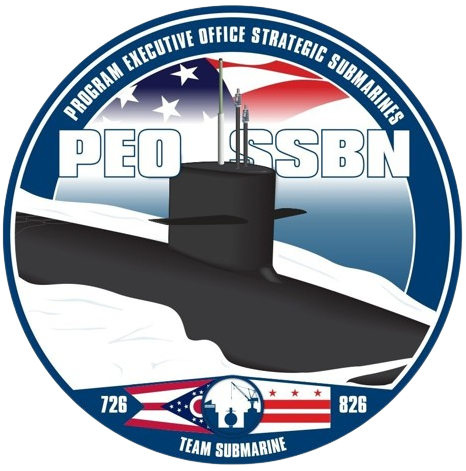
PEO (Strategic Submarines) emblem

PEO (Strategic Submarines) provides the Navy with design, construction, and delivery of the Columbia-class fleet ballistic missile submarine.

The Program Executive Officer for PEO (Strategic Submarines) is Rear Admiral Todd S. Weeks, USN, a post which he assumed in May 2024.

PEO (Strategic Submarines) comprises one major program office:

- PMS 397: COLUMBIA Class Program Office

== Program Executive Office Undersea Warfare Systems (PEO UWS) ==
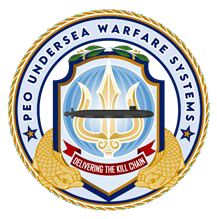
PEO (Undersea Warfare Systems) emblem

PEO Undersea Warfare Systems enables the delivery of enhanced combat capability, with improved cybersecurity and resiliency, to all submarine platforms.

The Program Executive Officer for PEO (UWS) is Rear Admiral Douglas J. Adams, USN, a post which he assumed in May 2024.

== Program Executive Office Unmanned and Small Combatants (PEO USC) ==
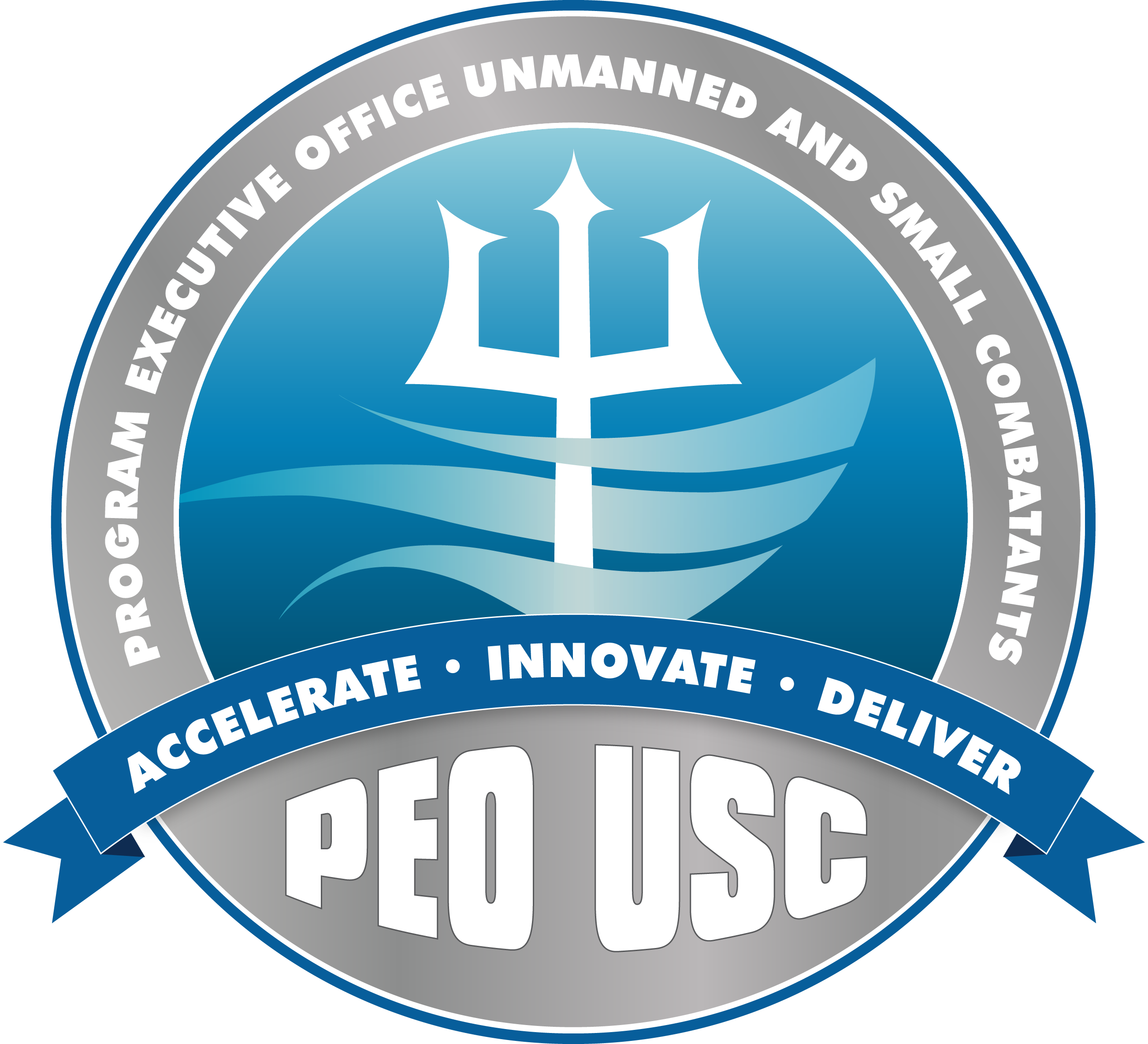
PEO (Unmanned and Small Combatants) emblem

PEO (USC) provides the Navy with the design, development, build, maintenance and modernization of unmanned maritime systems, mine warfare systems and small surface combatants. This PEO was established in March 2018 with the renaming of the Program Executive Office Littoral Combat Ship (PEO LCS) as Program Executive Office, Unmanned and Small Combatants (PEO USC).

The acting Program Executive Officer for PEO (USC) is Melissa L Kirkendall, SES, a post which she assumed in May 2025.

PEO (USC) comprises nine major program offices:

- PMS 340: Naval Special Warfare Program
- PMS 406: Unmanned Maritime Systems Program
- PMS 408: Expeditionary Missions
- PMS 420: LCS Mission Modules Program
- PMS 495: Mine Warfare Systems Program
- PMS 501: Littoral Combat Ships Program
- PMS 505: LCS Fleet Introduction and Sustainment Program
- PMS 515: Frigate Program
- PMS 525: International Unmanned and Small Combatants Program

== See also ==
Other SYSCOM program executive offices (PEO)

- PEOs of Naval Air Systems Command (NAVAIR)
- PEOs of Naval Information Warfare Systems Command (NAVWAR)

Related systems commands

- Marine Corps Systems Command
- Naval Air Systems Command
- Naval Facilities Engineering Systems Command
- Naval Information Warfare Systems Command
- Naval Sea Systems Command
- Naval Supply Systems Command
