= National Heart, Lung, and Blood Institute =

U.S. health institute

Coordinates: 39.00356°N 77.10133°W

Agency overview
- Formed: June 16, 1948; 78 years ago
- Jurisdiction: Federal government of the United States
- Agency executive: Gary H. Gibbons, Director
- Parent department: United States Department of Health and Human Services
- Parent agency: National Institutes of Health
- Website: www.nhlbi.nih.gov

The National Heart, Lung, and Blood Institute (NHLBI) is the third largest Institute of the National Institutes of Health, located in Bethesda, Maryland, United States. It is tasked with allocating about $3.6 billion in FY 2020 in tax revenue to advancing the understanding of the following issues: development and progression of disease, diagnosis of disease, treatment of disease, disease prevention, reduction of health care disparities within the American population, and advancing the effectiveness of the US medical system. NHLBI's Director is Gary H. Gibbons (2012–present).

== History ==
The National Heart Institute and the National Advisory Heart Council was established after the passage of the National Heart Act in 1948. The intramural research program was established a year later in 1949. In 1969, the National Heart Institute was renamed the National Heart and Lung Institute, and the scope of the institute was expanded. In 1976, it was given its current name, the National Heart, Lung, and Blood Institute. It had been designated as the agency responsible for blood research by the National Heart, Blood Vessel, Lung, and Blood Act of 1972, after the newly created National Sickle Cell Disease Program was put under its aegis.

The Institute plans, conducts, fosters, and supports an integrated and coordinated program of basic research, clinical investigations and trials, observational studies, and demonstration and education projects. Research is related to the causes, prevention, diagnosis, and treatment of heart, blood vessel, lung, and blood diseases, and sleep disorders. The NHLBI plans and directs research in development and evaluation of interventions and devices related to prevention, treatment, and rehabilitation of patients with such diseases and disorders. It also supports research on clinical use of blood and all aspects of the management of blood resources. Research by scientific institutions and individuals is supported by research grants and contracts through the NHLBI Extramural Program, while the NHLBI Division of Intramural Research conducts state-of-the-art research on the NIH Bethesda campus in its own laboratories.

For health professionals and the public, the NHLBI conducts educational activities, including development and dissemination of materials in the above areas, with an emphasis on prevention.

The NHLBI supports research training and career development of new and established researchers in fundamental sciences and clinical disciplines to enable them to conduct basic and clinical research related to heart, blood vessel, lung, and blood diseases, sleep disorders, and blood resources through individual and institutional research training awards (T90/R90), career development awards (K), and fellowships (i.e. T32/F32).

The NHLBI coordinates relevant activities in the above areas, including the related causes of stroke, with other research institutes and federal health programs. Relationships are maintained with institutions and professional associations, and with international, national, state, and local officials as well as voluntary agencies and organizations working in the above areas.

The NHLBI Division of Intramural Research (DIR) in Bethesda conducts research and training in a wide variety of areas broadly related to the mission of the institute, both clinical research and basic science research. There are 60 investigators, each of whom runs their own research program. They are supported by a group of core services that implement state-of-the-art techniques available to all NHLBI investigators. Marshall Nirenberg, Nobel laureate for his part in the discovery of the genetic code, became the head of the Section of Biochemical Genetics in 1962. The DIR also has a large training component, with opportunities for undergraduate, graduate, and medical students as well as post-doctoral training.

The NHLBI sponsors National Wear Red Day and the Heart Truth campaign, a national awareness campaign for women about heart disease.

== Organization ==
The research arm of the institute is organized into the following divisions:

- Biochemistry and Biophysics Center
- Cardiovascular and Pulmonary Branch
- Cardiovascular Epidemiology and Human Genomics Branch
- Cell and Developmental Biology Center
- Center for Molecular Medicine
- Hematology Branch
- Immunology Center
- Population Sciences Branch
- Sickle Cell Branch
- Systems Biology Center

== Past directors ==
List of NHLBI directors from 1948 - present

No.	Portrait	Director	Took office	Left office	Refs.
1		Cassius James Van Slyke	August 1, 1948	November 30, 1952	
2		James Watt	December 1, 1952	September 10, 1961	
3		Ralph E. Knutti	September 11, 1961	July 31, 1965	
4		William H. Stewart	August 1, 1965	September 24, 1965	
5		Robert P. Grant	March 8, 1966	August 15, 1966	
6		Donald S. Fredrickson	November 6, 1966	March 1968	
7		Theodore Cooper	March 15, 1968	April 19, 1974	
8		Robert I. Levy	September 16, 1975	June 1981	
9		Claude Lenfant	July 1, 1982	September 2, 2003	
acting		Barbara Alving	September 3, 2003	January 31, 2005	
10		Elizabeth Nabel	February 1, 2005	November 30, 2009	
acting		Susan Shurin	December 1, 2009	August 10, 2012	
11		Gary H. Gibbons	August 13, 2012	Present	

== See also ==
- Cardiac Arrhythmia Suppression Trial
- Dietary Approaches to Stop Hypertension
