= LPI =

LPI may refer to:

== Places ==
- Linköping/Saab Airport (IATA code), Sweden
- Linus Pauling Institute, at Oregon State University, US
- Pyramide Inversée, a skylight constructed in an underground shopping mall in front of the Louvre Museum in France
- Lady Parry Island, an uninhabited island in Nunavut, Canada

== Organizations ==
- Lunar and Planetary Institute, a scientific research institute dedicated to study of the Solar System, its formation, evolution, and current state
- Linux Professional Institute, a non-profit organization that provides vendor-independent professional certification for Linux system administrators and programmers
- LPI Media, a gay and lesbian publisher in the United States

== Science and technology ==
- Dye penetrant inspection or liquid penetrant inspection, an inspection method used to locate surface-breaking defects in all non-porous materials
- Lysinuric protein intolerance, an autosomal recessive metabolic disorder affecting amino acid transport
- Leaf plastochron index, a measure of plant leaf age based on morphological development
- Lysophosphatidylinositol, an endocannabinoid neurotransmitter
- Living Planet Index, an indicator of the state of global biological diversity, based on trends in vertebrate populations of species from around the world
- Light Pollution Index, a metric for measuring the effects of artificial light sources on night sky brightness
- Lines per inch, a measurement of printing resolution
- Laser Peripheral Iridotomy; see glaucoma surgery
- Liquid phase injectors and liquid propane injection, in autogas
- Low-power idle in Energy-Efficient Ethernet

== Economics and finance ==
- Logistics Performance Index, a benchmarking tool created by the World Bank
- Limited Price Indexation, a pricing index used in the calculation of increases in certain components of scheme pension payments in the UK
- Legatum Prosperity Index, an annual ranking developed by the Legatum Institute

== Other uses ==
- La Paz incident, occurred in May 1863 at the ghost town of La Paz in Confederate Arizona and was the westernmost confrontation of the American Civil War
- Language Proficiency Index, a Canadian standardized test for English proficiency written and administered by the University of British Columbia Applied Research and Evaluation Services
- Leading pedestrian interval, a type of traffic control
- Licensed private investigator, a type of private investigator
- Liga Primer Indonesia, an Indonesian top-tier football league held in 2011
- Linear partial information, a method of making decisions based on insufficient or fuzzy information

== See also ==
- Low probability of intercept radar (LPIR), a radar system designed to be difficult to detect
