= Pedestrian crossing =

Place designated for pedestrians to cross a road

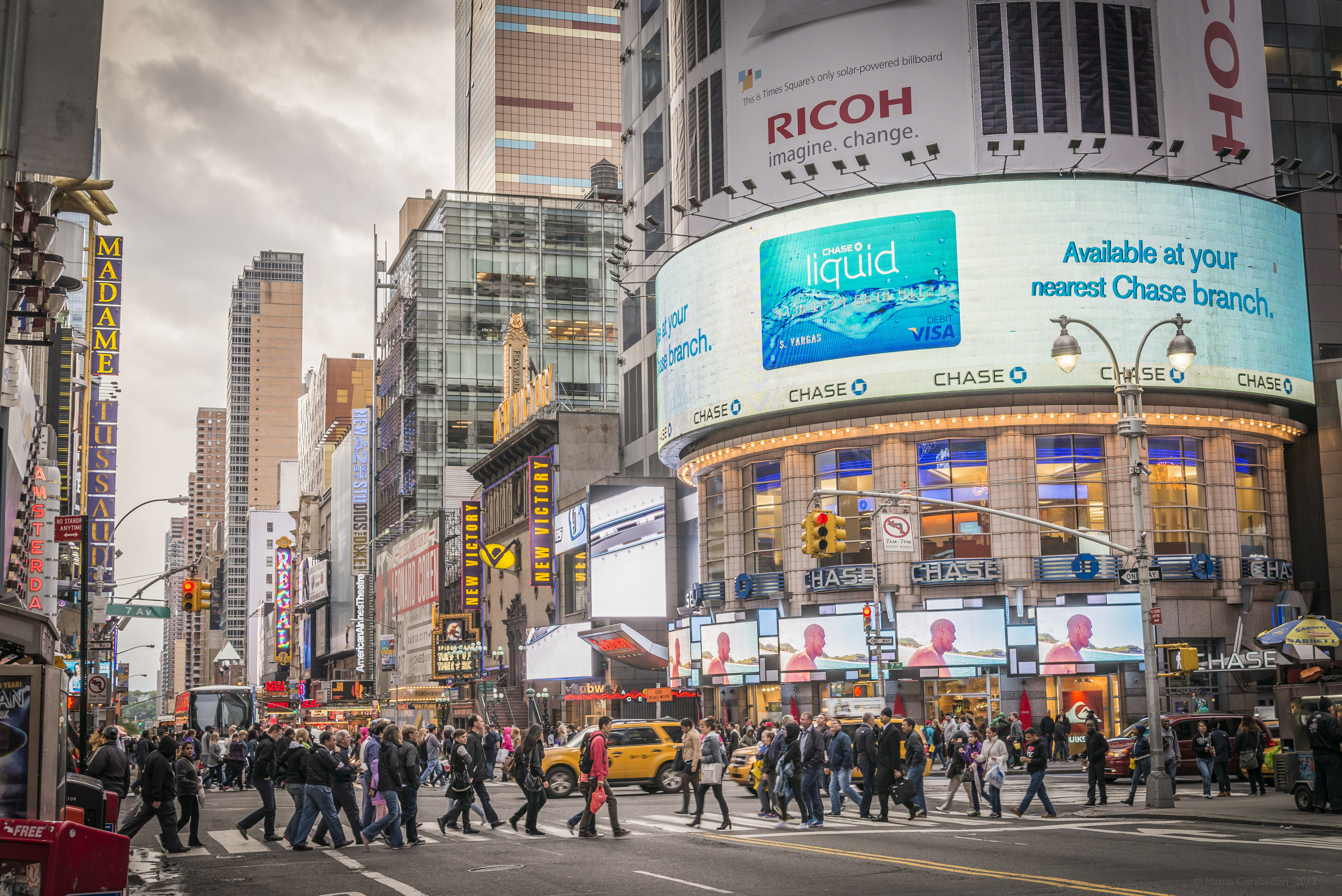
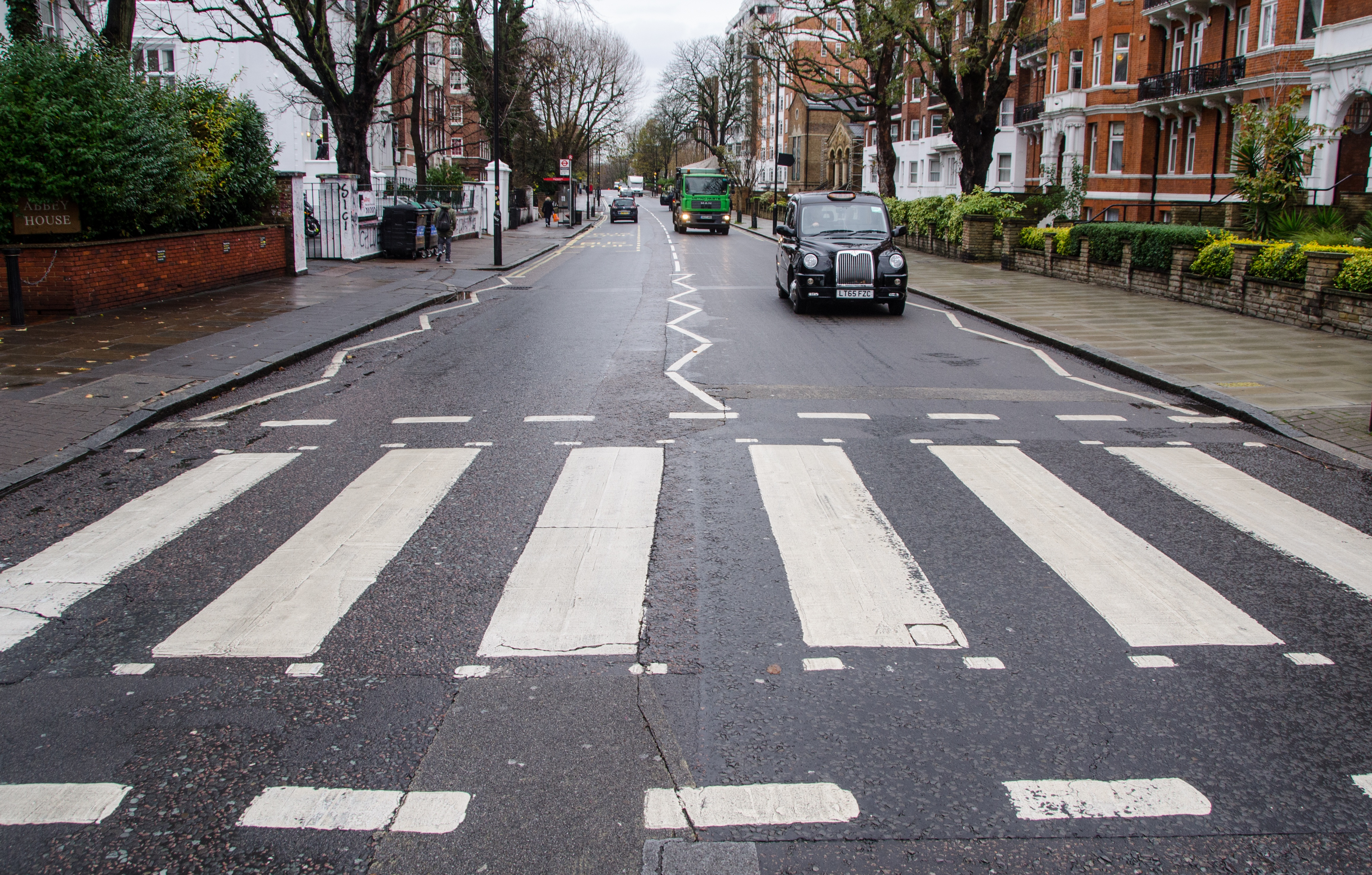
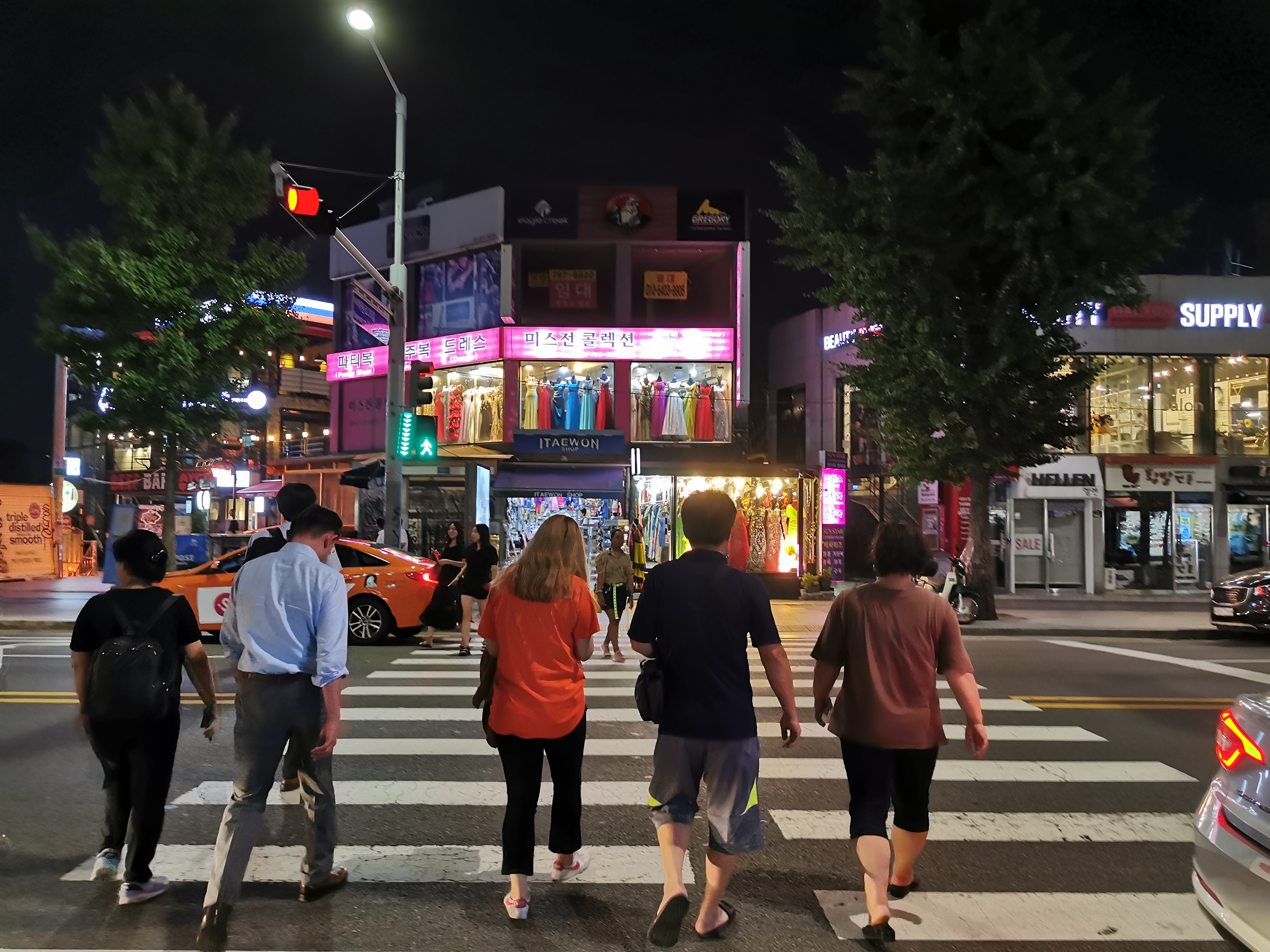
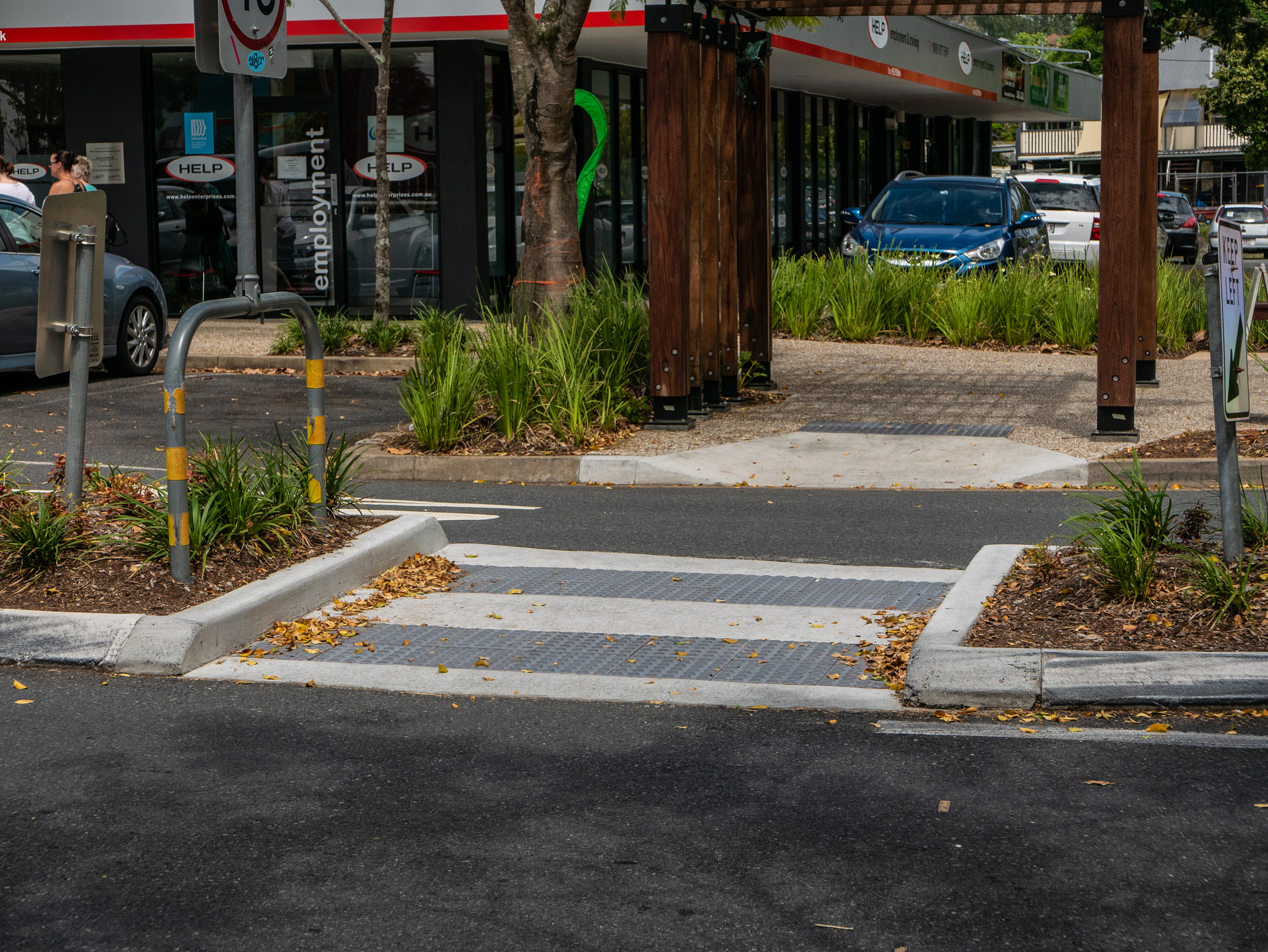
Pedestrian crossings in (clockwise, from top left) Times Square, Manhattan; London; Seoul; and Brisbane, Australia

A pedestrian crossing (or crosswalk in American and Canadian English) is a place designated for pedestrians to cross a road, street, or avenue. The term "pedestrian crossing" is also used in the Vienna and Geneva Conventions, both of which pertain to road signs and road traffic.

Marked pedestrian crossings are often found at intersections, but may also be at other points on busy roads that would otherwise be too unsafe to cross without assistance due to vehicle numbers, speed or road widths. They are also commonly installed where large numbers of pedestrians are attempting to cross (such as in shopping areas) or where vulnerable road users (such as school children) regularly cross. Rules govern usage of the pedestrian crossings to ensure safety; for example, in some areas, the pedestrian must be more than halfway across the crosswalk before the driver proceeds, and in other areas, jaywalking laws are in place which restrict pedestrians from crossing away from marked crossing facilities. Even in some jurisdictions with jaywalking laws, unmarked pedestrian crossings are assumed to exist at every intersection unless prohibited by signage.

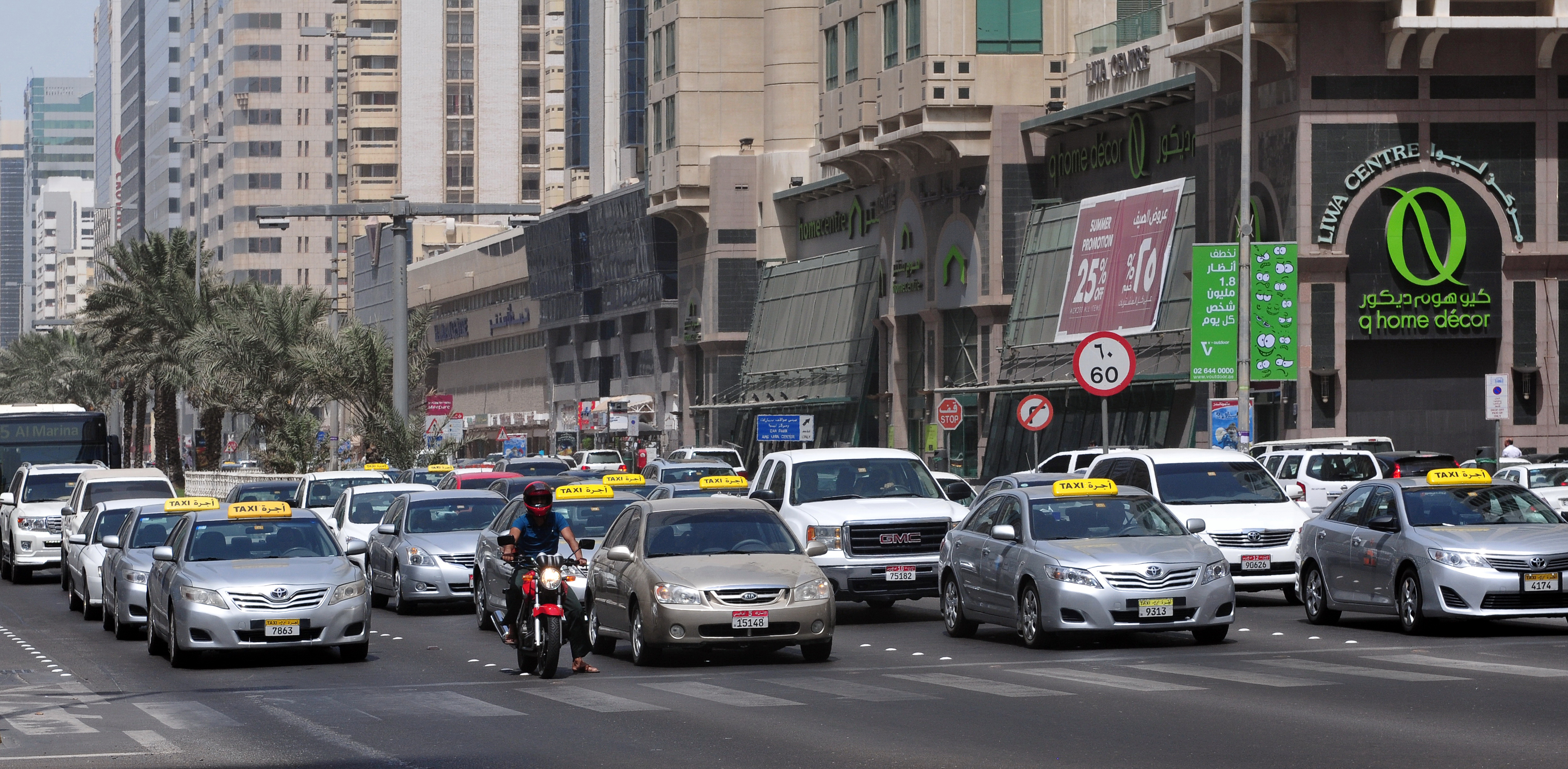
Pedestrian crossing in Abu Dhabi, UAE

Pedestrian crossings using pedestrian signals clearly separate when each type of traffic (pedestrians or road vehicles) can use the crossing. Crossings without signals generally assist pedestrians, and usually prioritise pedestrians, depending on the locality. Pelican crossings use signals to keep pedestrians together where they can be seen by motorists, and where they can cross most safely across the flow of vehicular traffic, whereas zebra crossings are uncontrolled and more appropriate for lower flow numbers. What appears to be just pedestrian crossings can also be created largely as a traffic calming technique, especially when combined with other features like pedestrian priority, refuge islands, or raised surfaces.

== History ==
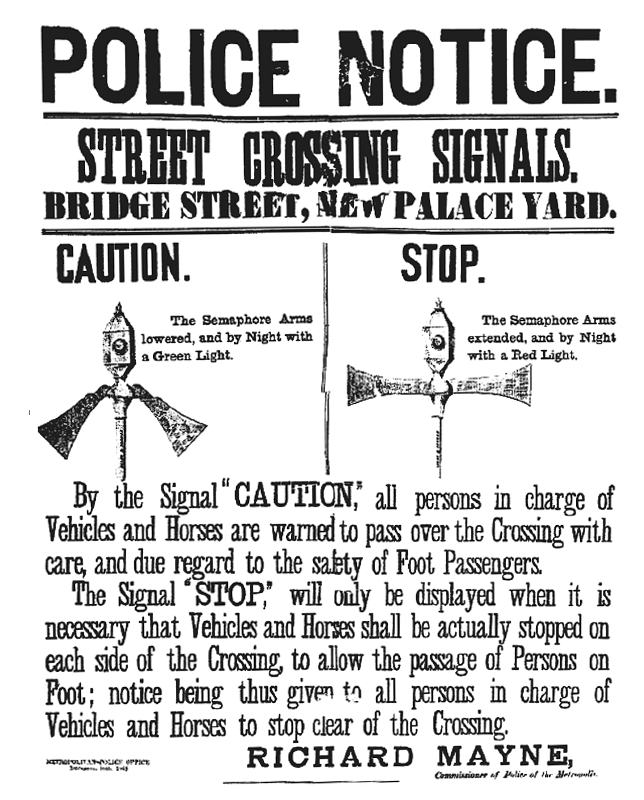
Police notice explaining the operation of the first pedestrian crossing signal, London 1868

The first pedestrian crossing signal was erected in London in December 1868. It was installed to allow pedestrians, especially Members of Parliament hurrying to vote, to cross Bridge Street to reach the Parliamentary Estate. It was the idea of John Peake Knight, a railway engineer. The signal consisted of three semaphore arms surmounted by a gas lantern which at night showed green and red aspects as appropriate to pedestrians and those on the carriageway (see image here). The semaphore arms were raised and lowered manually by a police constable who would rotate a handle on the side of the pole. However, in January 1869, the gas leaked and caused an explosion, injuring the police operator. No further work was done on signalled pedestrian crossings until fifty years later.

In the early 20th century, car traffic increased dramatically. A reader of The Times wrote to the editor in 1911:

Could you do something to help the pedestrian to recover the old margin of safety on our common streets and roads? It is heartrending to read of the fearful deaths taking place. If a pedestrian now has even one hesitation or failure the chance of escape from a dreadful death is now much less than when all vehicles were much slower. There is, too, in the motor traffic an evident desire not to slow down before the last moment. It is surely a scandal that on the common ways there should be undue apprehension in the minds of the weakest users of them. While the streets and roads are for all, of necessity the pedestrians, and the feeblest of these, should receive the supreme consideration.

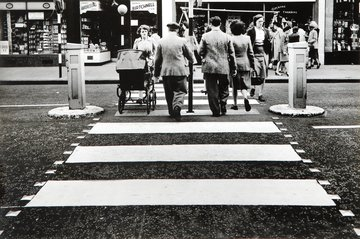
Pedestrian view from the first zebra crossing installed in the UK, Slough, c1951

On October 31, 1951, in the town of Slough, west of London, the first pedestrian crossing in history was marked. The black and white striped crossings were dubbed "zebra crossings", and the Ministry of Transport had installed 1,000 experimental versions across the UK in 1949 during a "Pedestrian Safety Week". The exact source of the name "zebra crossing" cannot be confirmed with certainty, but it is believed that it came from the visual similarity of the crossing with the stripes on zebra fur. It is believed that the term "zebra crossing" was first used by British politician and military officer James Callaghan.

The first zebra crosswalk installation was described as "equally spaced white stripes running parallel to the direction of vehicle flow for the width of the crosswalk. The stripes are generally 24 inches wide, as are the areas between them. The major value of this design is in its conspicuousness to both drivers and pedestrians. Drivers tend to be more conscious of the full crosswalk width."

From an early test of the design by the Department of Scientific and Industrial Research in 1948, even before any public education occurred, men increased crossing in the desired place from 45% to 53%, women from 63% to 69%, and children from 69% to 81%.

Other patterns tested included transverse, longitudinal, and diagonal stripes, as well as checkerboards. The zebra performed the best, and the Ministry of Transport officially adopted the zebra as the standard design in October 1951. There were fewer pedestrian casualties throughout Great Britain in 1952 and 1953 than in the years prior to the development of the zebra crossings. Dr. W. H. Glanville, director of the Road Research Laboratory reported 7% decrease in pedestrian accidents, a larger decrease in towns with crosswalks than without, 8% decrease in towns versus 2% in rural districts, and an increase of 2% in Northern Ireland where no changes were made.

Norfolk, Virginia was one of the first cities in the United States to test the zebra pattern in 1953. There were 4 pedestrians injured per year at the plain crosswalks, and in the three years after the zebra was installed there were zero.

== Criteria ==
Pedestrian crossing warrants are guidelines for the appropriate pedestrian crossing type for a site's traffic conditions. There are several guidelines in use across the world, and guidance and practice differ between jurisdictions. An over-emphasis by traffic engineers on vehicular movement in these criteria is criticised for neglecting the safety of pedestrians.

Pedestrians have a right to cross roads safely and, therefore, planners and engineers have a professional responsibility to plan, design, and install safe crossing facilities.

— Charles Zegeer of the University of North Carolina Highway Safety Research Center

In some jurisdictions, the decision to mark a crossing is given a quantitative veneer through formulae such as PV^{2}, a prescription developed in the United Kingdom in 1987 and later expanded to India and Iran. Under this prescription, the pedestrian traffic volume rate P and vehicle traffic volume rate V are both estimated during peak hours, and the product PV^{2} is used to determine which type of crossing, if any, should be installed. For example, if 500 pedestrians cross the road per hour and 600 vehicles per hour use that road section, the resulting PV^{2} of 1.8×10^{8} pedestrian×vehicle^{2}/hr^{3} dictates that a pelican crossing should be installed.

The US Manual on Uniform Traffic Control Devices (MUTCD) advises that crosswalk markings should 'not be used indiscriminately' and encourages engineering studies at sites away from signalized intersections and STOP or Yield signs. It admonishes against crossing markings (without extra engineering interventions) on high-traffic routes if the speed limit exceeds 40 miles per hour (64 km/h). The Manual is criticised for enabling motorist-focused traffic engineers to avoid implementing street safety measures.

Tactical urbanist groups implement guerrilla crosswalks by public nomination, especially at junctions where nominations for marked crossings via formal channels have been repeatedly ignored by city government, or where the government's stated timeline for marking a crossing is implausibly long. In Los Angeles, a low-intensity conflict between the government and the guerrilla groups frequently results in the removal of the guerrilla crosswalks, although a few are normalised; occasionally, city police have arrested guerrillas.

== Types and design ==

Type (incl. various names)	Image	Description	Notes
Informal crossings		Crossings giving equal priority to pedestrian and vehicular traffic.	A refuge is sometimes installed so that a pedestrian can cross in two stages; called 'unmarked crosswalk' in North America.
Zebra crossing		Formed of black and white stripes (resembling a Zebra). Pedestrians normally have priority over vehicular traffic.	Called a 'marked crosswalk' in North America.
Signal-controlled crossing		Crossing with call buttons, pedestrian signals, and traffic lights, HAWK beacons, or Rectangular Rapid Flashing Beacons (RRFB) for vehicular traffic.	Sometimes known as a 'pelican crossing'
Multi-user crossing		Crossings allowed to be used by non-pedestrians, such as cyclists or horse riders.	Sometimes known as 'toucan crossing'
Pedestrian underpass		A pedestrian pathway in a tunnel under a road, providing a crossing without interrupting pedestrian or vehicular traffic.	Also known as a subway.
Pedestrian overpass		Footbridge over a pedestrian pathway, allowing pedestrians to cross without interrupting vehicular traffic.	Also known as a footbridge.

=== Unmarked crossings ===
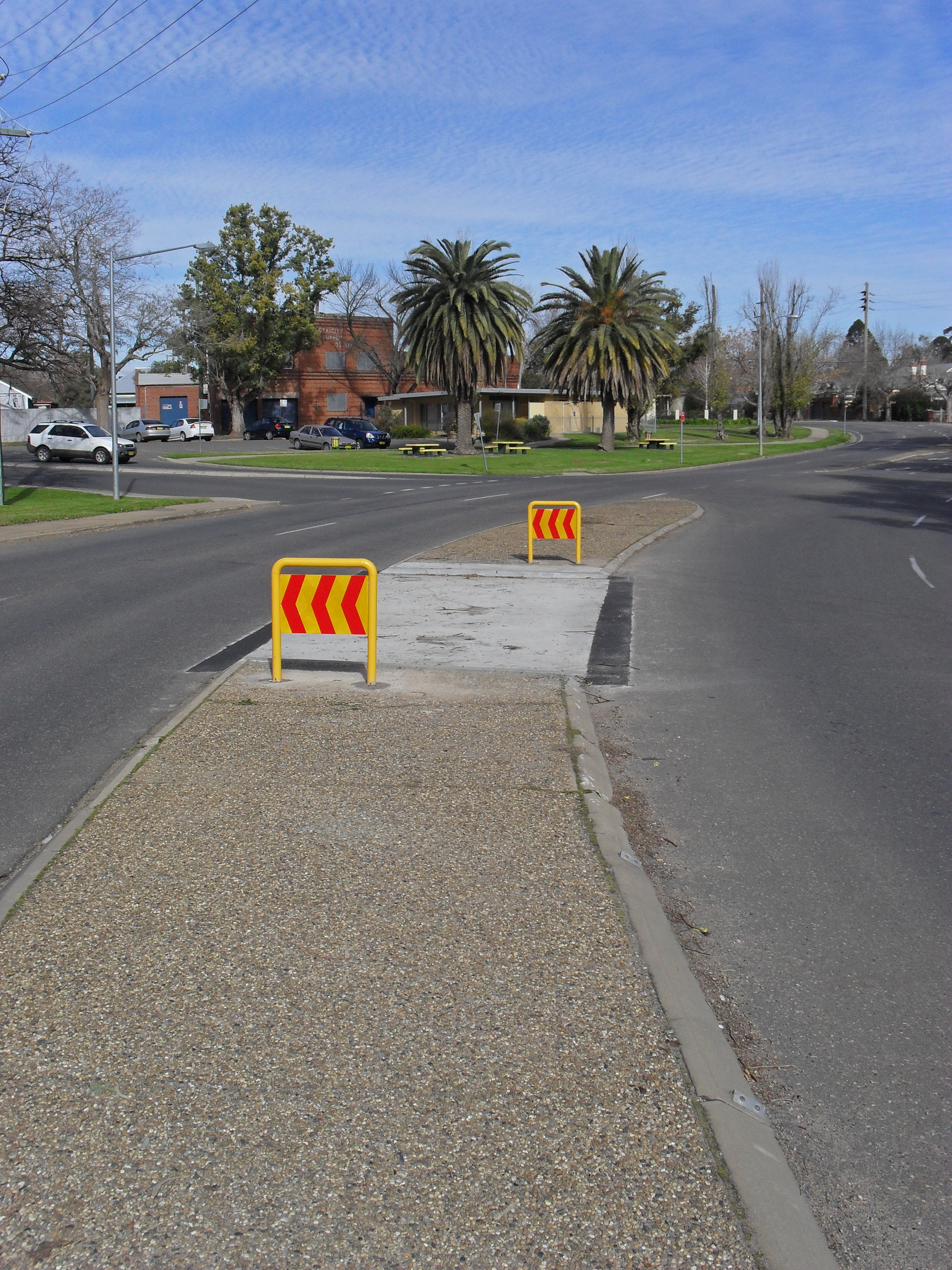
A pedestrian refuge in Wagga Wagga, Australia

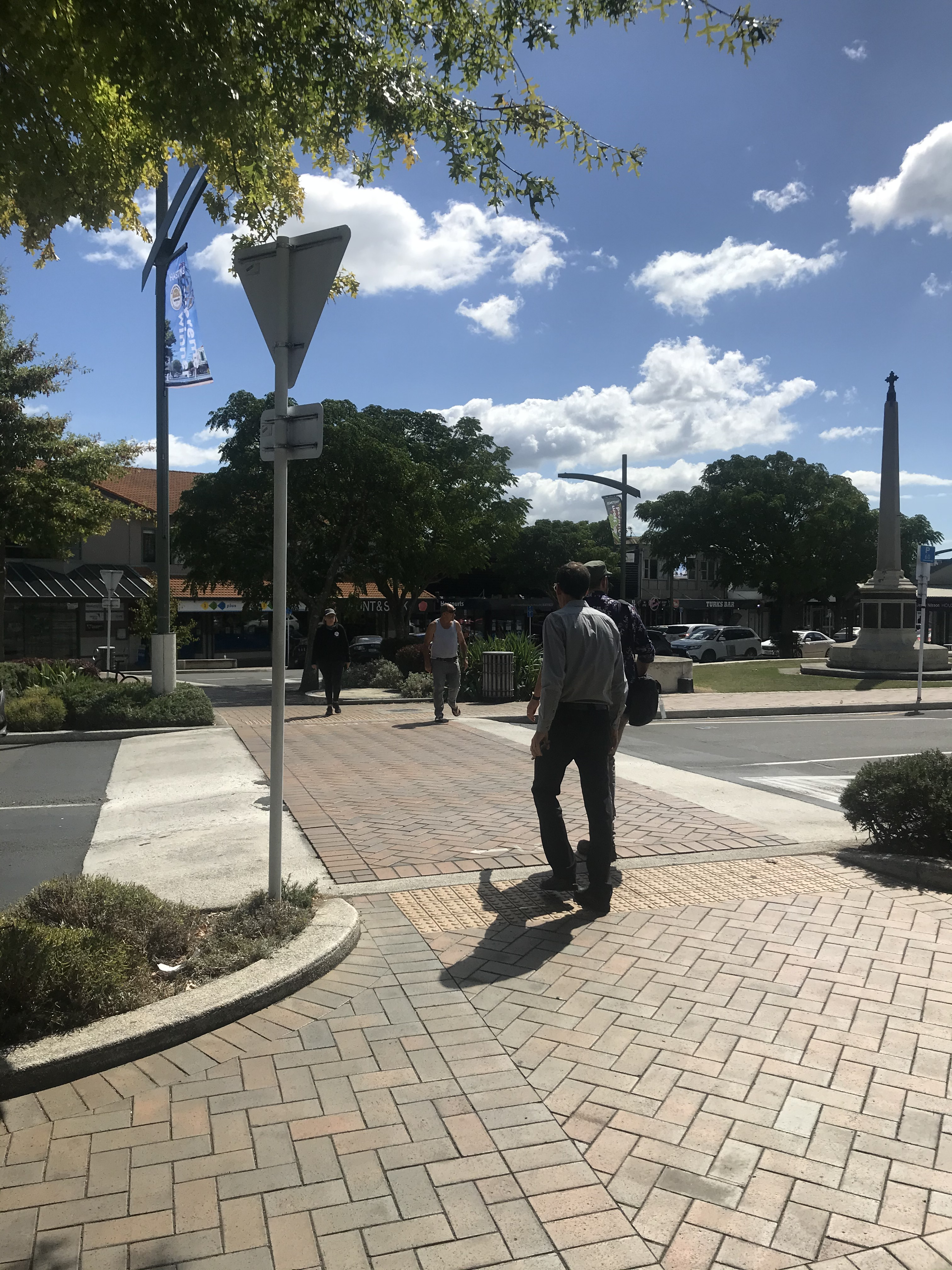
A courtesy crossing in Havelock North, New Zealand

In some countries, including the US, "unmarked crosswalks" are presumed to occur at intersections even if a crossing is not marked, except at locations where pedestrian crossing is expressly prohibited.

Pedestrian refuges are uncontrolled crossings with two dropped kerbs and a central traffic island, protected by kerbs. The island allows pedestrians to cross the road one direction of traffic at a time, which can be quicker and safer (they decrease pedestrian accidents by around 40%) than a lack of crossing. Additionally, they can narrow the road, slowing down vehicles and preventing them from overtaking. However, they may not afford pedestrians priority, meaning pedestrians may have a longer wait than a controlled crossing. They can also create pinch points, which can be dangerous for cyclists.

Courtesy crossings are uncontrolled crossings with coloured surfacing or some other non-formal suggestion that pedestrians may cross. They aim to encourage concentrated pedestrian crossings and to encourage drivers to let pedestrians cross the roads out of courtesy, rather than obligation. The inclusion of stripes (e.g. in paving), the presence of narrowing and visual narrowings of the road positively affect courtesy.

=== Marked crossings ===
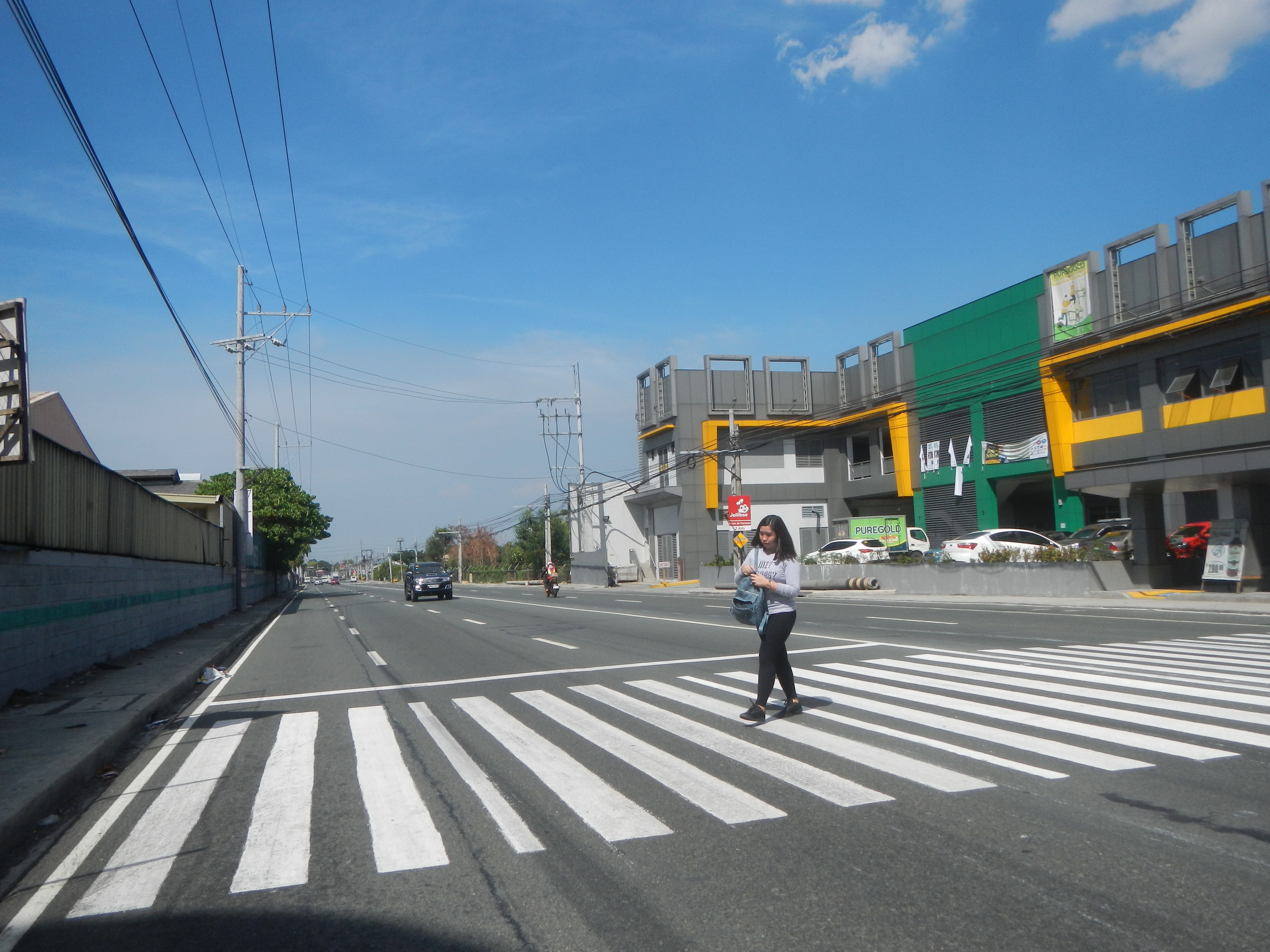
A woman at a marked crossing in Carmona, Philippines

The simplest marked crossings may just consist of some markings on the road surface. In the US these are known as "marked crosswalks". In the UK these are often called zebra crossings, referring to the alternate white and black stripes painted on the road surface. If the pedestrian has priority over vehicular traffic when using the crossing, then they have an incentive to use the crossing instead of crossing the road at other places. In some countries, pedestrians may not have priority, but may be committing an offence if they cross the road elsewhere, or "jaywalk". Special markings are often made on the road surface, both to direct pedestrians and to prevent motorists from stopping vehicles in the way of foot traffic. There are many varieties of signal and marking layouts around the world and even within single countries. In the United States, there are many inconsistencies, although the variations are usually minor. There are several distinct types in the United Kingdom, each with their own name.

Pedestrian cross striping machines are special equipment professionally used to paint zebra lines on the intersections or other busy road sections. Because of the characteristics of zebra crossings, parallel stripes that are wide but not long, the striping machine is often a small hand-guided road marking machine, which can easily be made to change direction. There are differences between the engineering regulations in different countries. The marking shoe of a pedestrian cross striping machine, which determines marking lines' width, is much wider than on other marking machines. A smaller marking shoe with wheels may be used to perform the road striping.

The section of road should be swept clean and kept dry. The painter first pulls a guiding line straight and fix the two ends on the ground. Then they spray or brush a primer layer on the asphalt or concrete surface. The thermoplastic paint in powder form is then melted into a molten liquid state for painting. Finally, the painter pulls or pushes the striping machine with the guide rod along the guiding line. As an alternative to thermoplastics, household paint or epoxy can be used to mark crosswalks.

=== Signal-controlled crossings ===
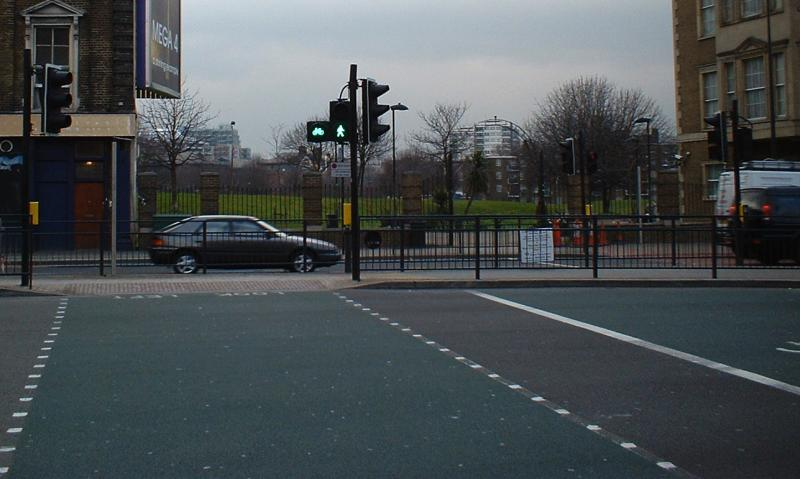
A toucan crossing in England

Some crossings have pedestrian traffic signals that allow pedestrians and road traffic to use the crossing alternately. On some traffic signals, pressing a call button is required to trigger the signal. Audible or tactile signals may also be included to assist people who have poor sight. In many cities, some or most signals are equipped with countdown timers to give notice to both drivers and pedestrians the time remaining on the crossing signal. In places where there is very high pedestrian traffic, Embedded pavement flashing-light systems are used to signal traffic of pedestrian presence, or exclusive traffic signal phases for pedestrians (also known as Barnes Dances) may be used, which stop vehicular traffic in all directions at the same time.

==== Pedestrian scramble ====
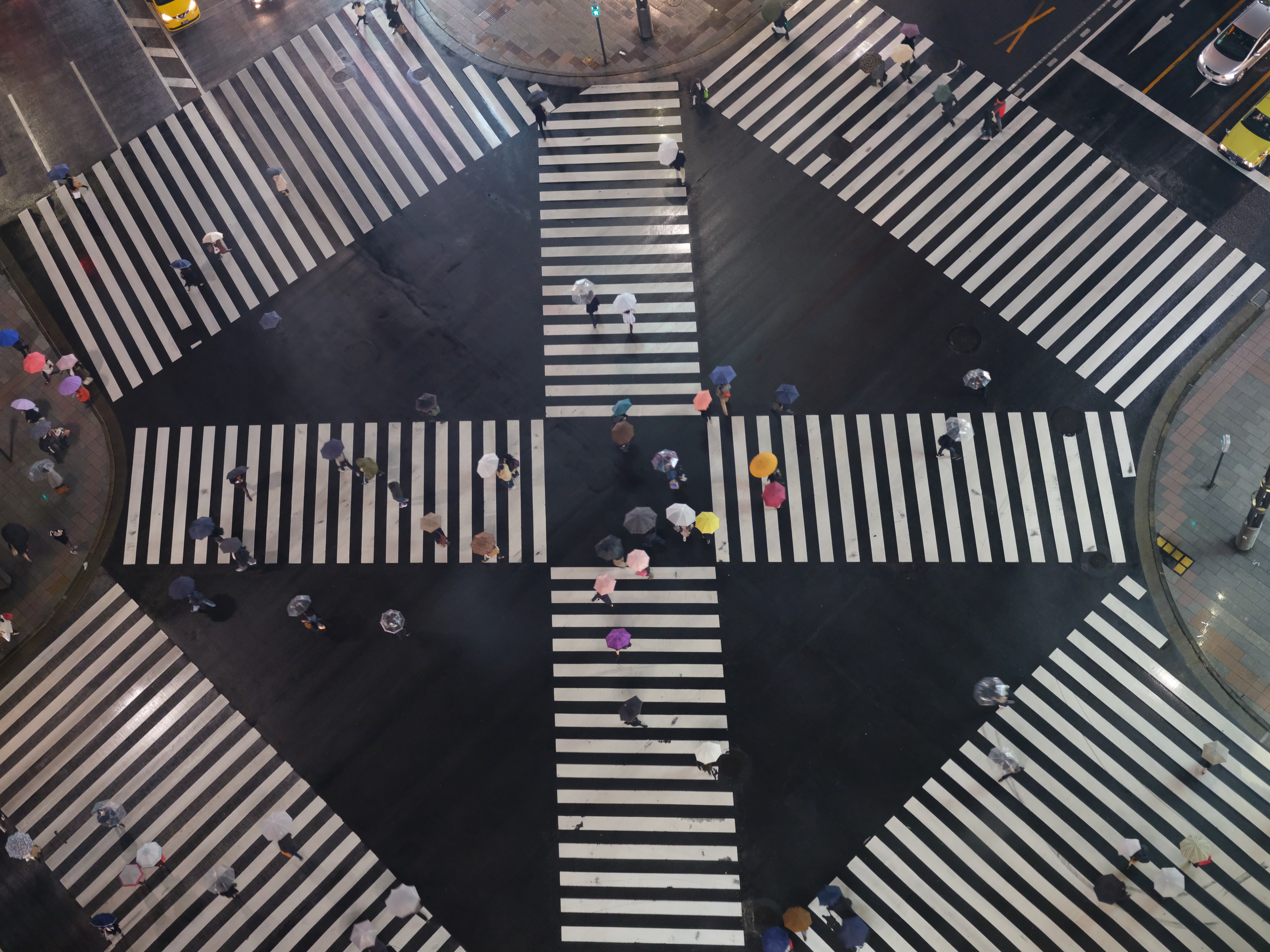
A pedestrian scramble in Tokyo, Japan

Some intersections display red lights to vehicles in all directions for a period of time. Known as a pedestrian scramble, this type of vehicle all-way stop allows pedestrians to cross safely in any direction, including diagonally.

==== Multiple-stage crossings ====
A pedestrian crossing at traffic signals may be single stage or multiple-stages (also known as multi-stage or two-stage). A single stage crossing is where a pedestrian can cross the intersection at once. A multi-stage crossing typically has a traffic 'island' and requires the pedestrian to wait for a second signal before proceeding.

In Toronto, single-stage crossings are mandated unless such a crossing would have "capacity issues due to the longer cycle length required" and would not create safety issues. Multi-stage crossings are only permitted when there is a traffic island at the median.

=== Footbridges and tunnels ===
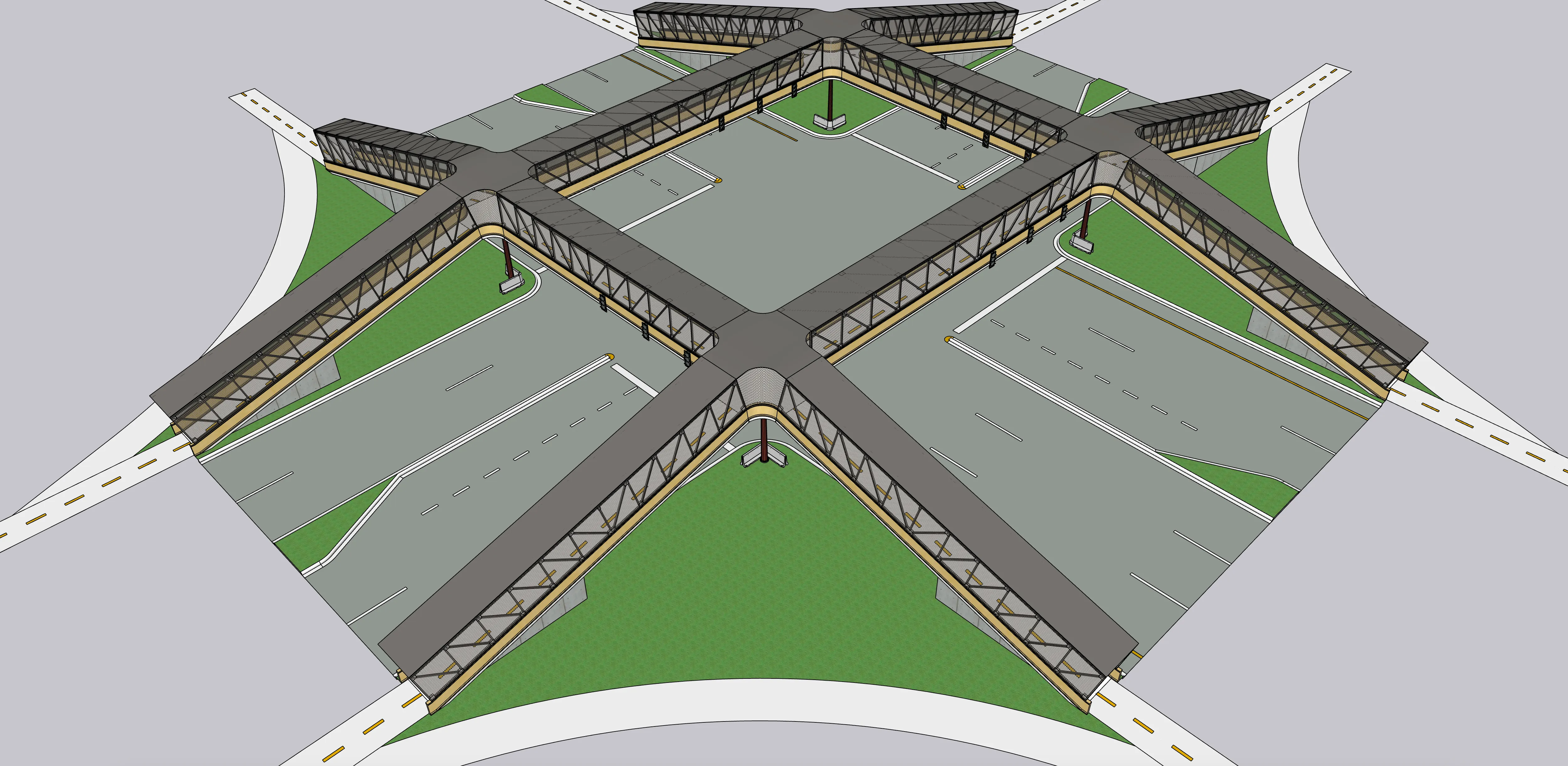
Pedestrian overhead crosswalk

Footbridges or pedestrian tunnels may be used in lieu of crosswalks at very busy intersections as well as at locations where limited-access roads and controlled-access highways must be crossed. They can also be beneficial in locations where the sidewalk or pedestrian path naturally ascends or descends to a different level than the intersection itself, and the natural "desire line" leads to a footbridge or tunnel, respectively.

However, pedestrian bridges are ineffective in most locations; due to their expense, they are typically spaced far apart. Additionally, ramps, stairs, or elevators present additional obstacles, and pedestrians tend to use an at-grade pedestrian crossing instead. A variation on the bridge concept, often called a skyway or skywalk, is sometimes implemented in regions that experience inclement weather.

=== Crosswalk shortening ===
Pedestrian refuges or small islands in the middle of a street may be added when a street is very wide, as these crossings can be too long for some individuals to cross in one cycle. These pedestrian refuges may consist of building traffic islands in the middle of the road, extending an existing island or median strip to the crosswalk to provide a refuge, or simply cutting through the existing island or median strip where the median is already continuous.

Another relatively widespread variation is the curb/kerb extension (also known as a bulb-out), which narrows the width of the street and is used in combination with crosswalk markings. They can also be used to slow down cars, potentially creating a safer crossing for pedestrians.

=== Artwork crossings ===
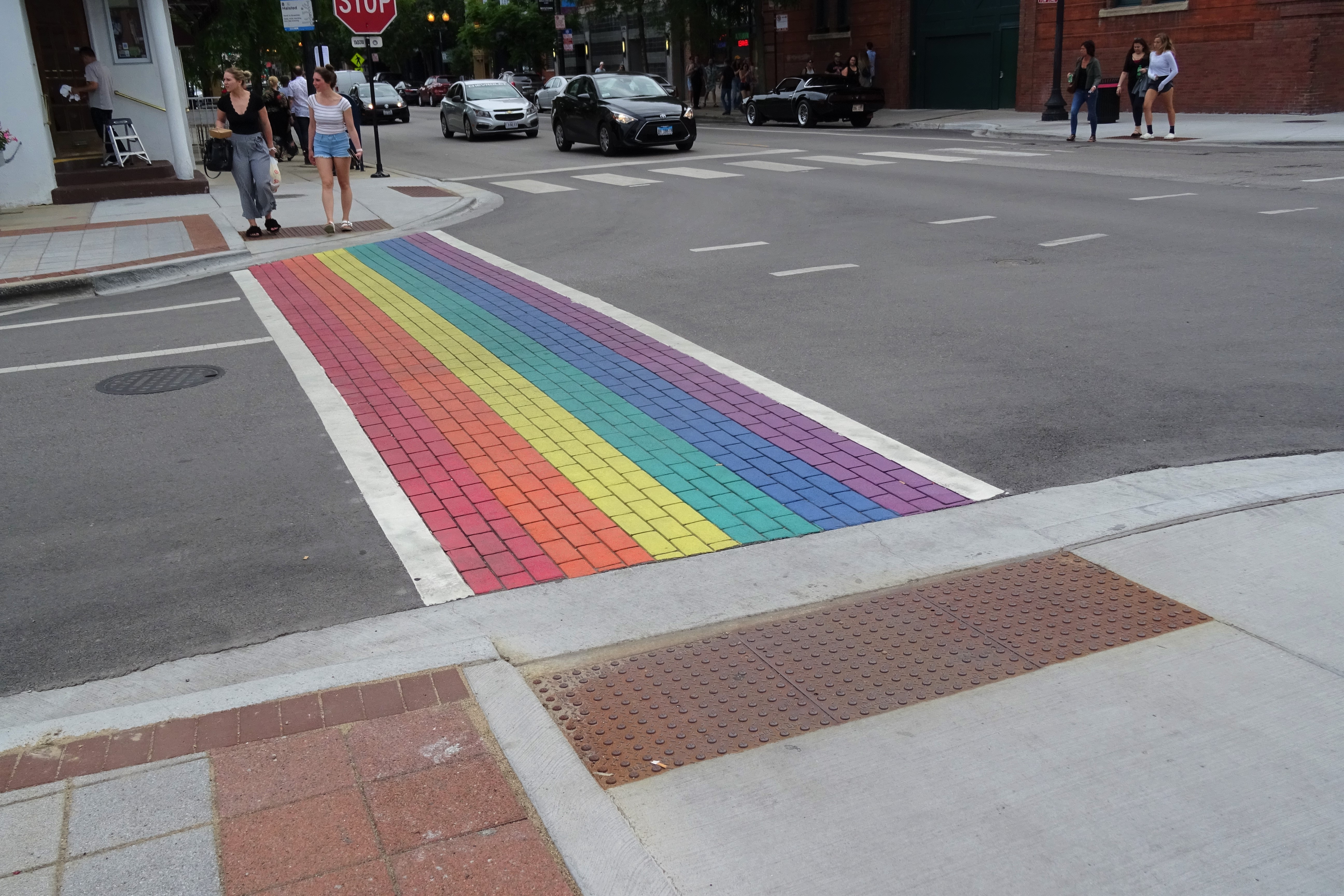
A rainbow pedestrian crossing in Chicago, United States

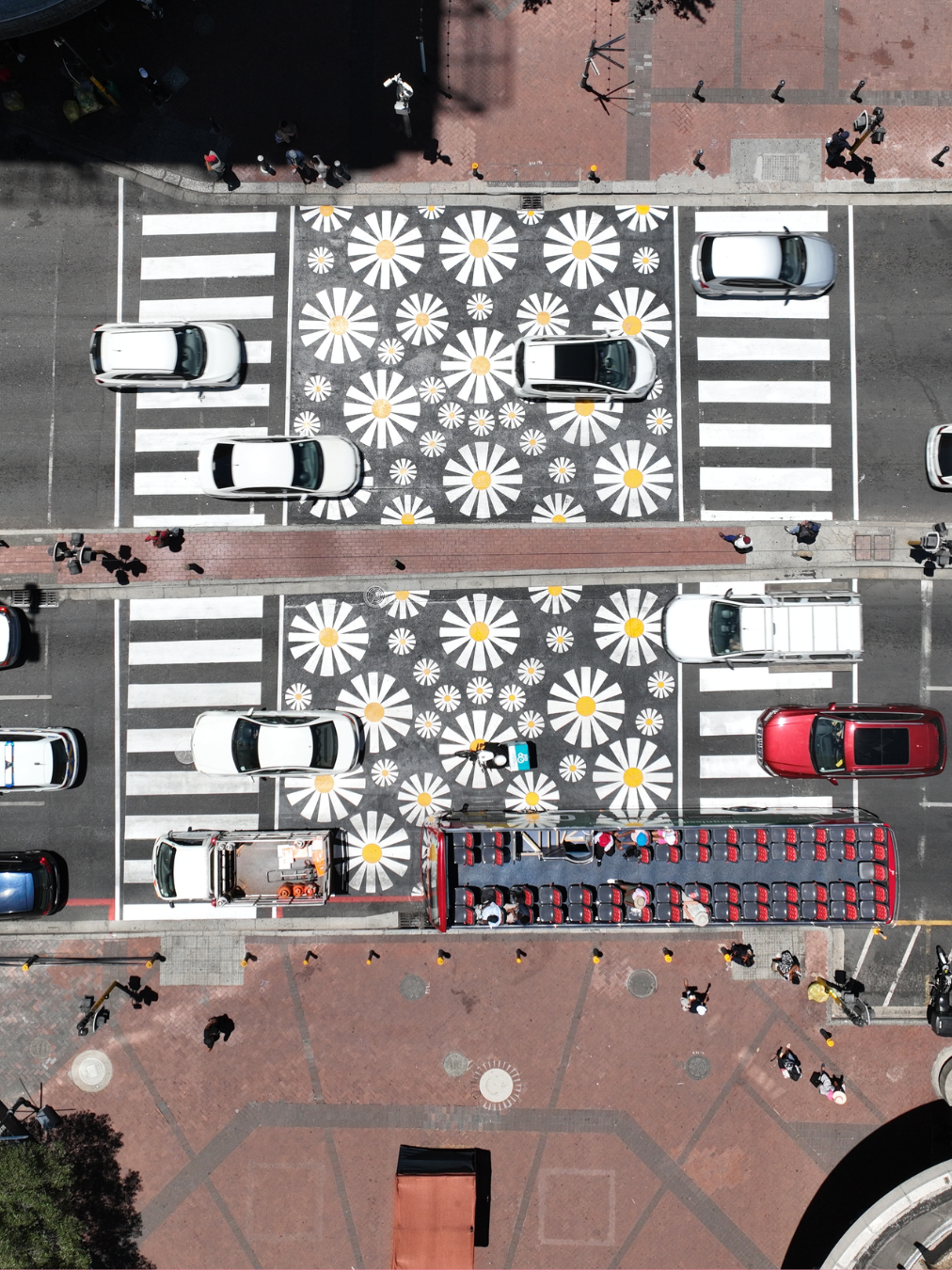
Bird's-eye view of the Strand Street Crossing, an African daisy-styled artwork pedestrian crossing in Cape Town

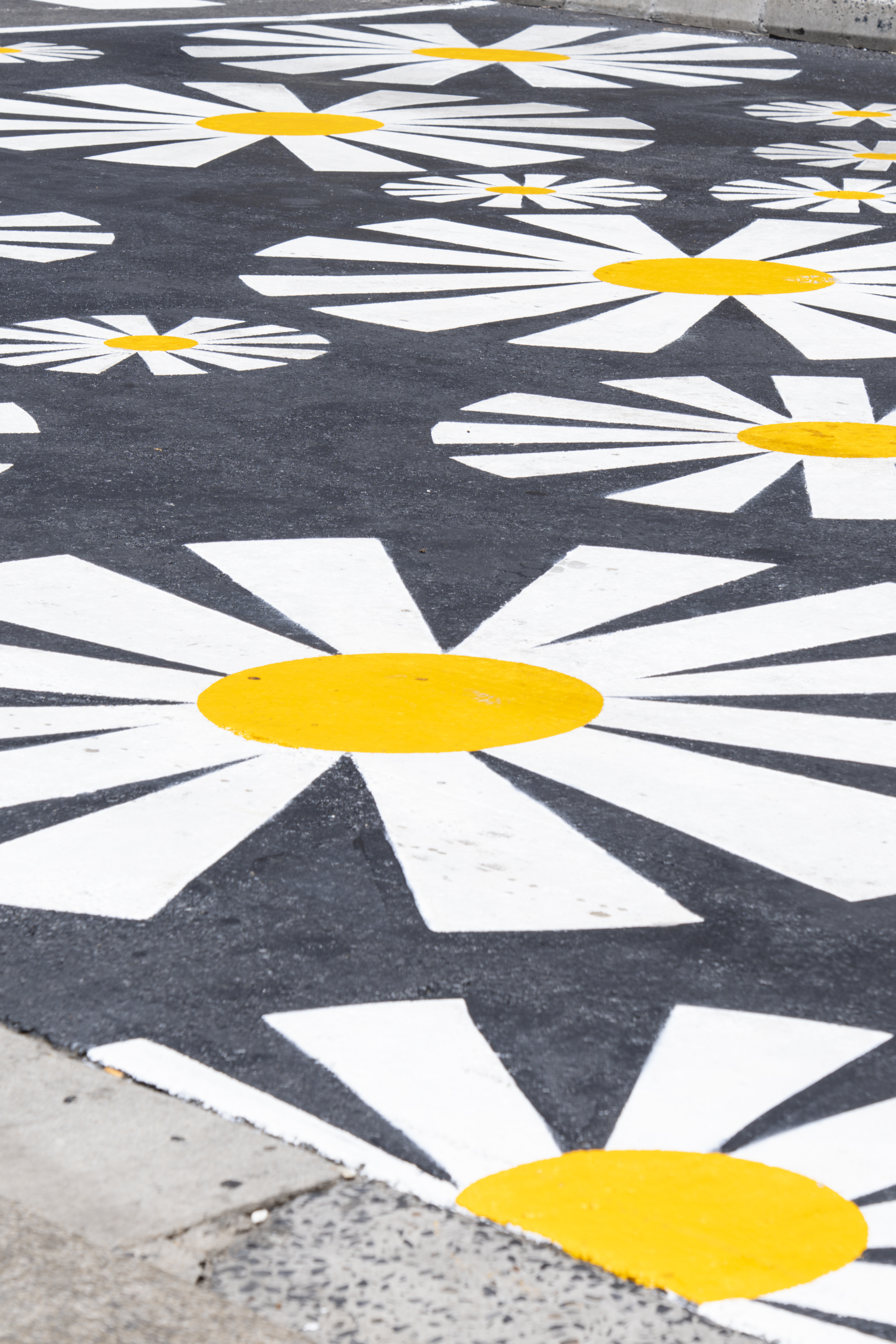
Designed by Heather Moore and implemented by Mission for Inner City Cape Town

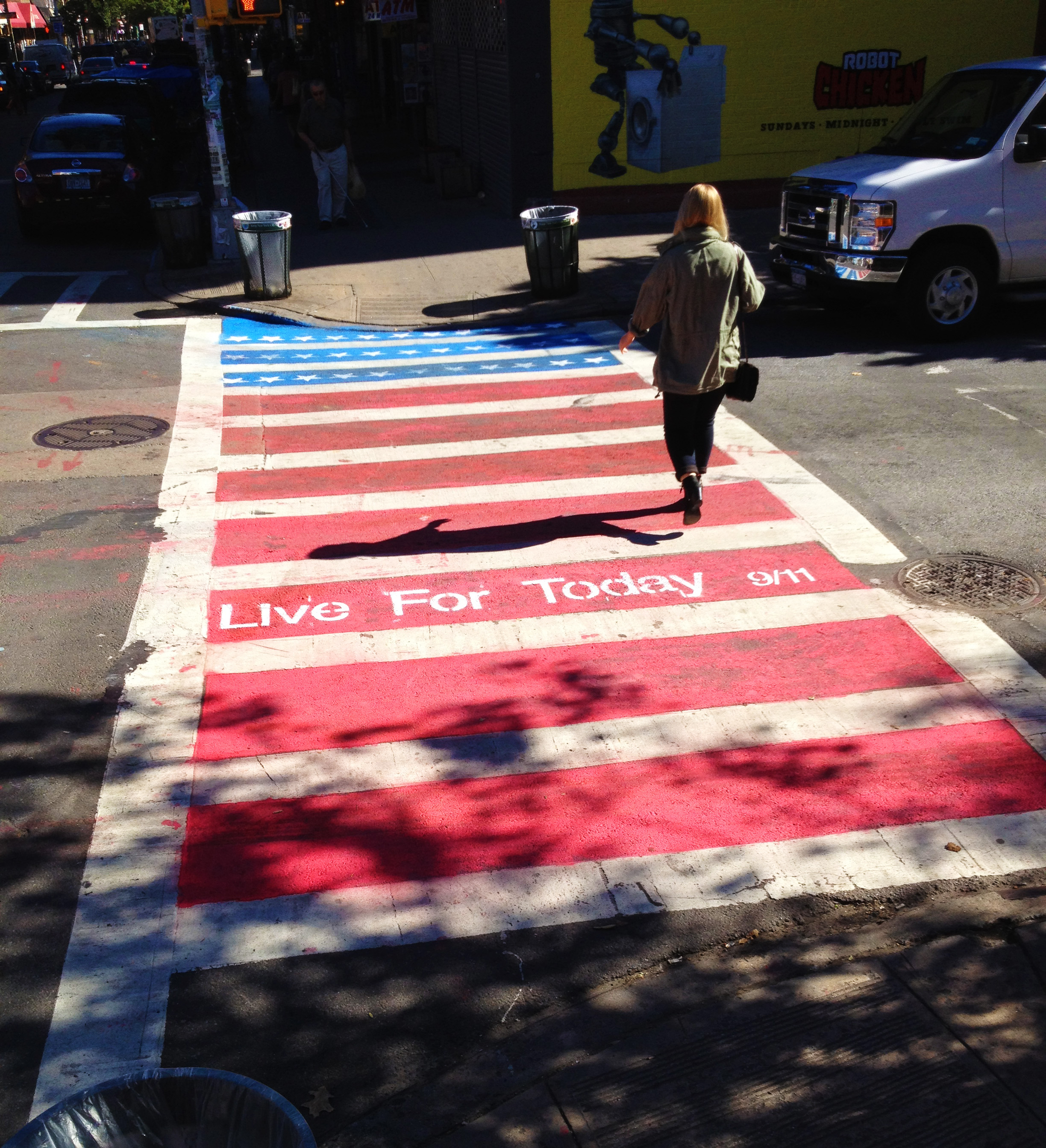
Patriotic American flag crosswalks found in NYC on 9/11/12

Some crosswalks, known as colourful crossings, include unique designs, many of which take the form of artwork. These works of art may serve many different purposes, such as attracting tourism or catching drivers' attention.

Cities and towns worldwide have held competitions to paint crosswalks, usually as a form of artwork. In Santiago, Chile, a 2013 work by Canadian artist Roadsworth features yellow-and-blue fish overlaid on the existing crosswalk. Other crossings worldwide also feature some of Roadsworth's work, including a crosswalk in Montreal where the zebra stripes are shaped like bullets, as well as "conveyor belt" crosswalk in Winston-Salem, North Carolina.

In Lompoc, California, several artists were commissioned to create an artwork as part of its "Creative Crossings" competition. Artist Marlee Bedford painted the first set of four crosswalks as part of the 2015 competition, and Linda Powers painted two more crosswalks in 2016 following that year's competition.

An artwork crossing was installed in late 2025 in the Cape Town CBD, the economic center of Cape Town, South Africa. Located on busy Strand Street - one of the CBD's main (and widest) streets - the two parallel crossings have been designed as African daisy shapes by Heather Moore and implemented by Mission for Inner City Cape Town. Their purpose is to improve visibility and safety for pedestrians.

In New York City, a 2012 guerrilla installation marked the anniversary of September 11 with American-flag-themed crosswalks painted across SoHo, the Financial District and Williamsburg, Brooklyn. The crosswalks, featuring red and white stripes, white stars on blue, and the words “Live For Today 9/11,” were designed by Miami Ad School students as a memorial gesture "symbolizing unity and remembrance."

In Tbilisi, Georgia, some Tbilisi Academy of Arts students and government officials jointly created a crossing that is designed to look like it is in 3D. A message on the white bars of the crosswalk reads, "for your safety."

3D crosswalk designs have also been installed in China, with a "floating zebra crossing" implemented in a village in Luoyuan County to boost tourism; a multicolored 3-D crossing installed in Changsha, China to catch drivers' attention; and another multicolored crossing in Sichuan Province that serves the same purpose as the colored Changsha crosswalk.

Colored crosswalks might have themes that reflect the immediate area. For instance, Chengdu, China had a red-and-white zebra crossing with hearts painted on it, reflecting its location near a junction of two rivers.

In Curitiba, Brazil, a crosswalk with its bars irregularly painted like a barcode served as an advertisement for a nearby shopping center, but was later painted over. A pedestrian scramble in the Chinatown section of Oakland, California, is painted with red-and-yellow colors to signify the colors of the flag of China.

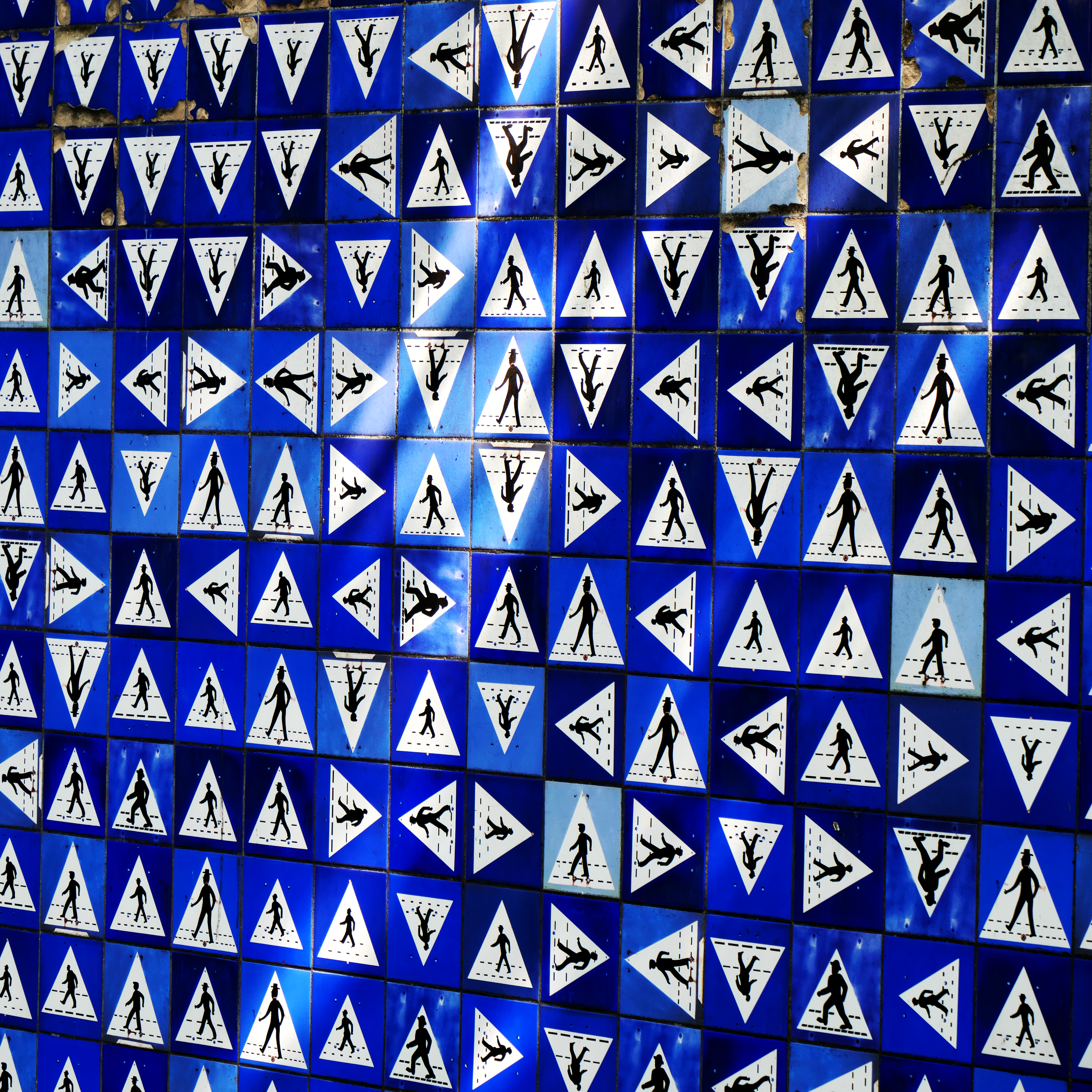
Pedestrian crossing sign used in art, University of Bremen campus, Germany

Sometimes, different cities around the world may have similar art concepts for their crosswalks. Rainbow flag-colored crosswalks, which are usually painted to show support for the locality's LGBT cultures, have been installed in San Francisco; West Hollywood; Philadelphia;, Cape Town, and Tel Aviv. Crosswalks painted like piano keyboards have been painted in Long Beach; Warsaw; and Chongqing.

The United States Federal Highway Administration prohibits crosswalk art due to concerns about safety and visibility, but U.S. cities have chosen to install their own designs. Seattle had 40 crosswalks with unique designs, including the rainbow flag in Capitol Hill and the Pan-African flag in the Central District.

=== Raised crossings ===
Raised crossings are a traffic calming measure that contains speed tables spanning the crossing. The crossings are demarcated with paint and/or have special paving materials. These crossings allow the pedestrian to cross at grade with the sidewalk and has been shown to reduce pedestrian crashes by 45% due to reduction of vehicular speeds and the prominence of the pedestrian in the driver's field of vision.

== Distinctions by region ==
=== North America ===
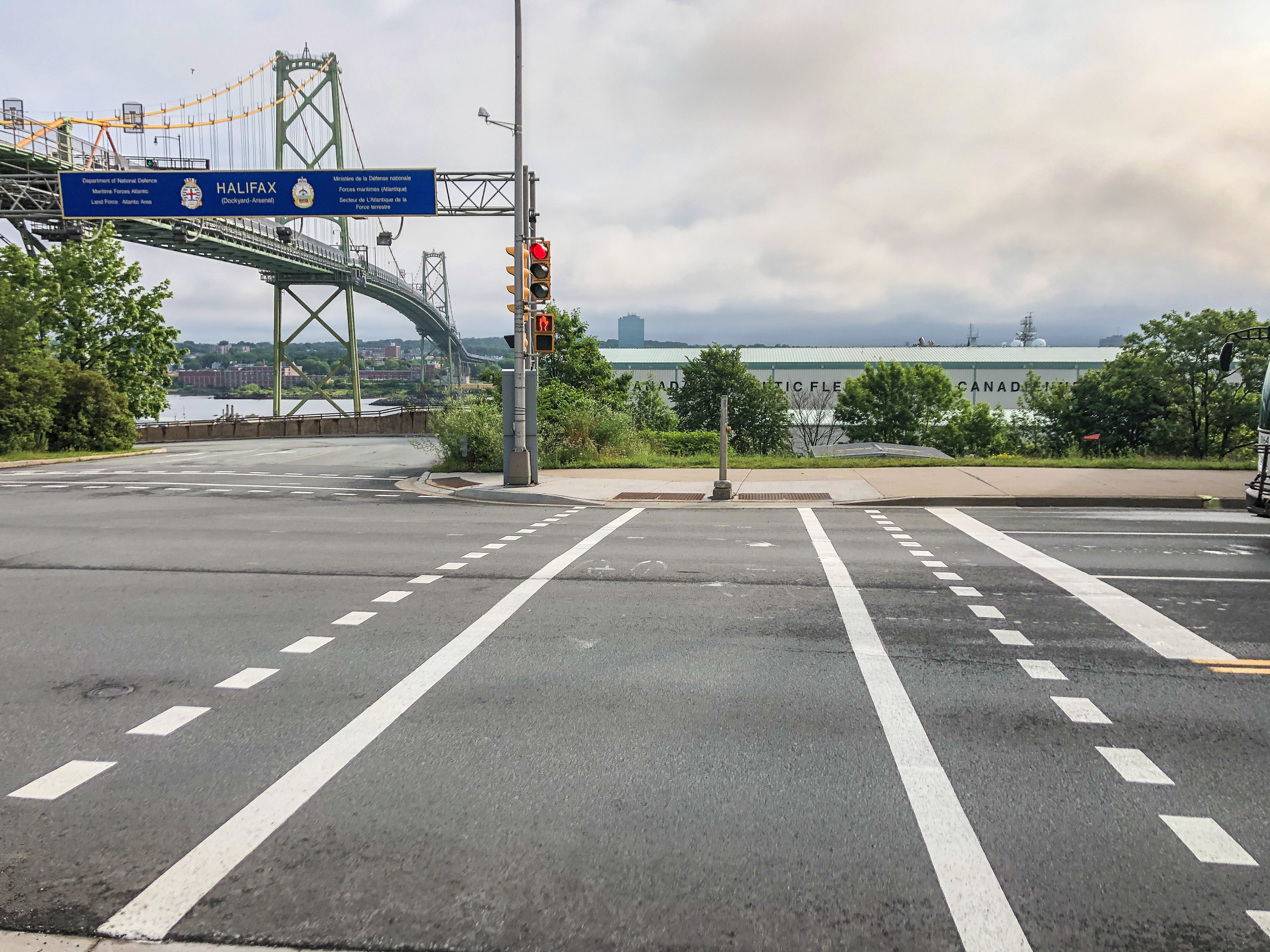
A crosswalk at a signalized intersection, showing the 'parallel line'-type

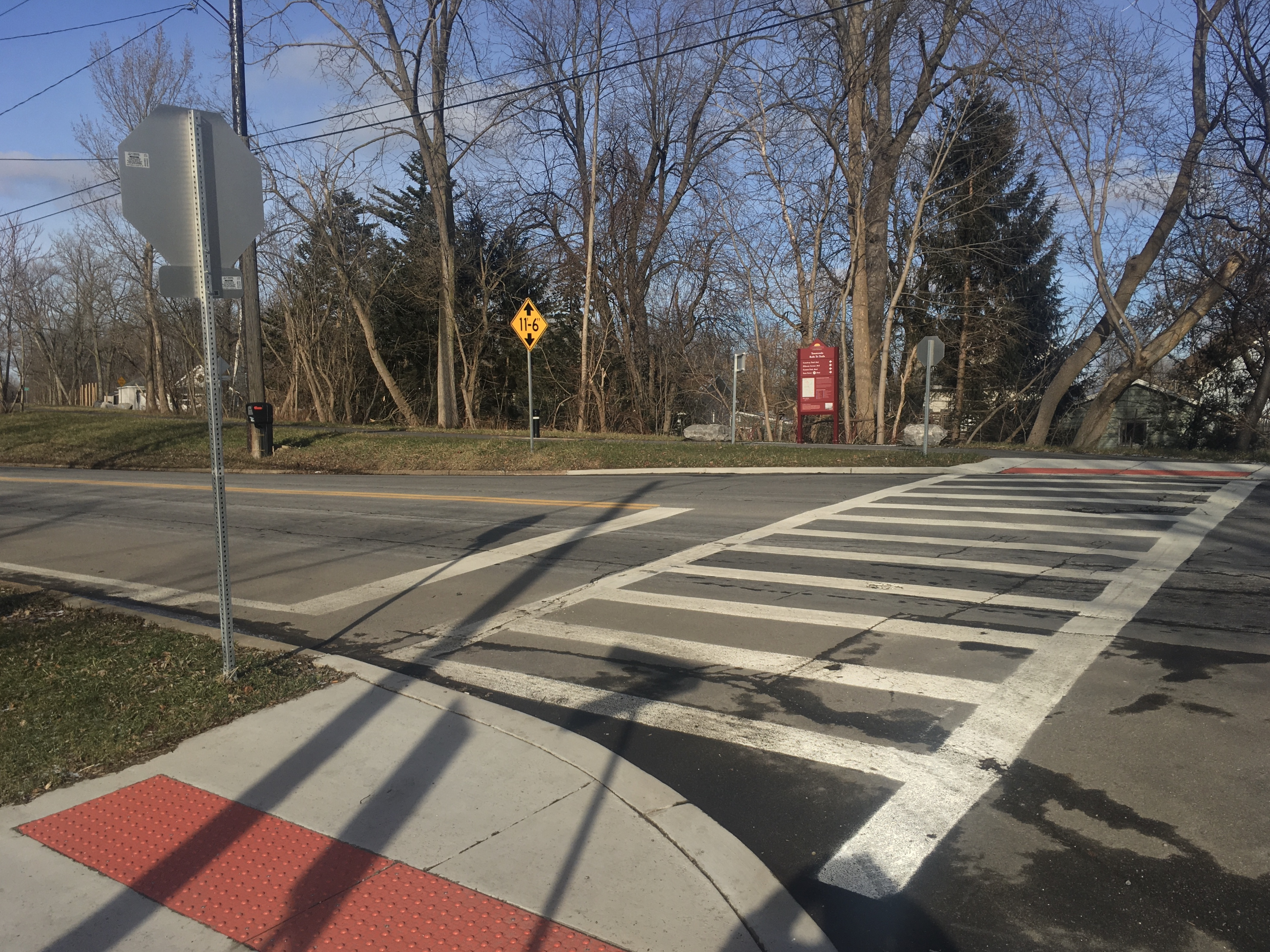
A ladder-style crosswalk by a STOP sign

In the United States, crosswalks are sometimes marked with white stripes, though many municipalities have slightly different styles. The designs used vary widely between jurisdictions, and often vary even between a city and its county (or local equivalents). Most frequently, they are marked with two parallel white lines running from one side of the road to the other, with the width of the lines being typically 12 to 24 inches (300 to 610 mm) wide.

Marked crosswalks are usually placed at traffic intersections or crossroads, but are occasionally used at mid-block locations, which may include additional regulatory signage such as "PED XING" (for "pedestrian crossing"), flashing yellow beacons (also known as rectangular rapid-flashing beacons or RRFBs), stop or yield signs, or by actuated or automatic signals. Some more innovative crossing treatments include in-pavement flashers, yellow flashing warning lights installed in the roadway, or HAWK beacon.

Crossing laws vary between different states and provinces and sometimes at the local level. All U.S. states require vehicles to yield to a pedestrian who has entered a marked crosswalk, and in most states crosswalks exist at all intersections meeting at approximately right angles, whether they are marked or not.

At crossings controlled by signals, generally the poles at both ends of the crosswalk also have the pedestrian signal heads. For many years these bore white walk and Portland Orange dont walk legends, but this has been changed to pictograms of an "upraised hand" and a "walking person" since the Manual on Uniform Traffic Control Devices (MUTCD) was updated in 2009.

=== Europe ===
In Spain, the United Kingdom, Germany and other European countries, 90% of pedestrian fatalities occur outside of pedestrian crossings. The highest rate is in the UK, which has fewer crossings than neighbouring European countries.

==== Continental Europe ====
The typical Continental pedestrian crossing sign

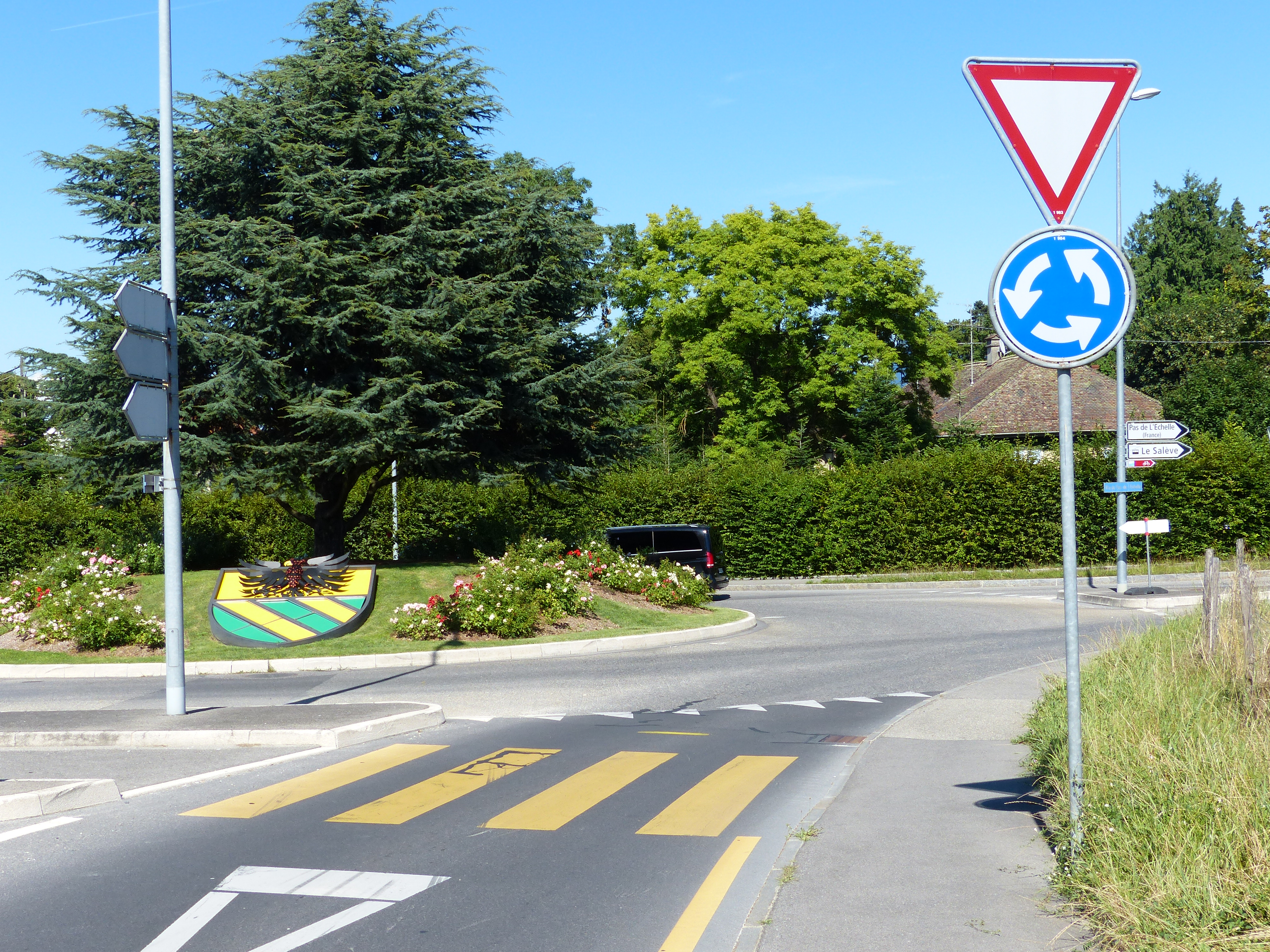
Swiss yellow pedestrian crossings

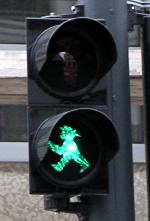
A Berlin Ampelmännchen signal, showing green

Nearly every country of continental Europe is party to (though has not necessarily ratified) the Vienna Convention on Road Signs and Signals (1968), which says of pedestrian crossings: 'to mark pedestrian crossings, relatively broad stripes, parallel to the axis of the carriageway, should preferably be used'. This means that pedestrian crossing styles are quite uniform across the Continent. However, while the stripes are normally white, in Switzerland they are yellow.

Furthermore, the Vienna Convention on Road Traffic (1968) states that pedestrians should use pedestrian crossings when one is nearby (§6.c) and prohibits the overtaking of other vehicles approaching crossings, unless the driver would be able to stop for a pedestrian. The 1971 European supplement to that Convention re-iterates the former and outlaws the standing or parking of vehicles around pedestrian crossings. It also specifies signs and markings: the "pedestrian crossing sign" is on a blue or black ground, with a white or yellow triangle where the symbol is displayed in black or dark blue, and that the minimum width recommended for pedestrian crossings is 2.5 m (or 8-foot) on roads on which the speed limit is lower than 60 km/h (or 37 mph), and 4 m (or 13-foot) on roads with a higher or no speed limit.

In France, it is not mandatory that crosswalks exist. However, if there is one less than 50 meters (55 yards) away, pedestrians are obliged to use it.

In the east of Germany, including Berlin, the unique Ampelmännchen design for pedestrian lights are widely used. These signals originated in the former East Germany and have become an icon of the city and of ostalgie – nostalgia for East German life. A study has shown they are more effective than Western-style icons.

==== United Kingdom ====
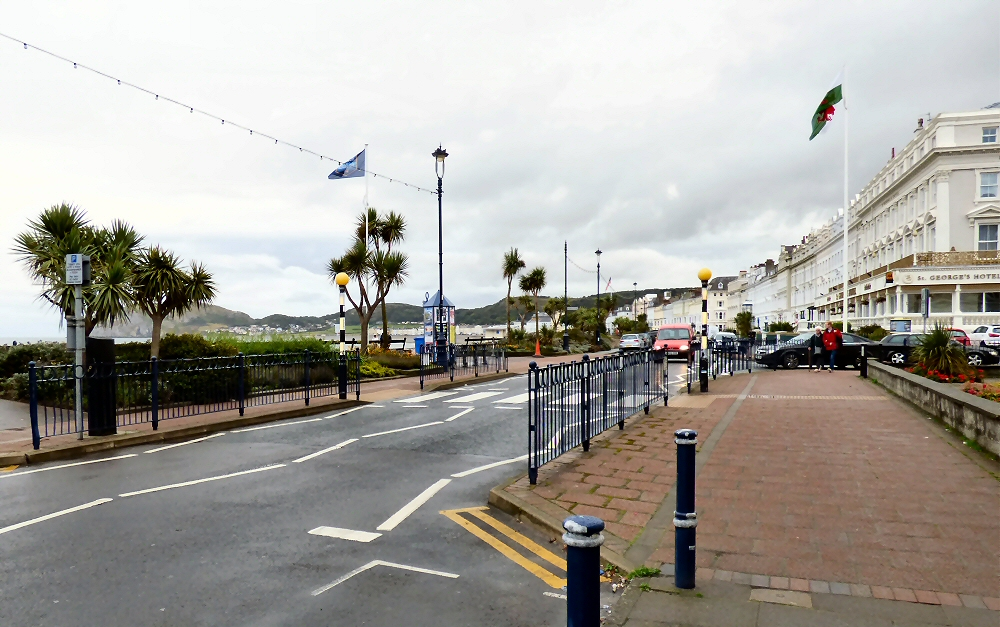
A zebra crossing on the sea front of Llandudno, with the traditional – and mandatory – 'belisha' beacons

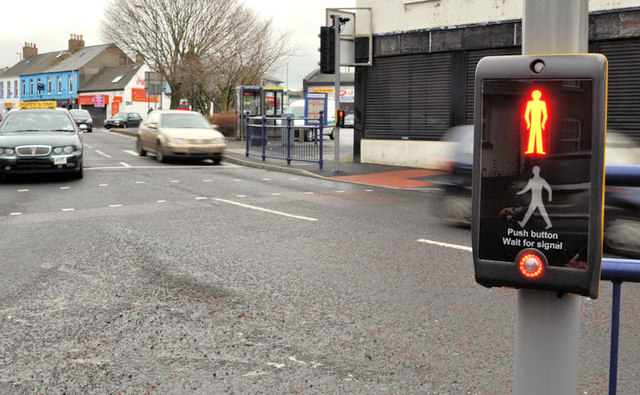
Traditional 'farside' signals are frequently replaced with 'nearside' signal boxes, like this one in Coleraine.

The United Kingdom's pedestrian crossings are quite distinct from the vast majority of Europe, and they use animal names to distinguish different types of crossing. These conventions have been adapted in some ex-Empire countries, such as Ireland, Hong Kong and Malta. 'Look right' and 'look left' markings are sometimes found in tourist areas, to remind pedestrians of the driving direction in the UK.

Zebra crossings are similar to their Continental counterparts, with white stripe markings, they must have orange flashing globes, called 'belisha beacons'. They also normally have zig-zag markings to prevent overtaking and stopping of vehicles.

There are a number of different types of signal-controlled crossing. The traditional pelican crossing is no longer permitted in the UK, because it has been replaced with more intelligent puffin crossings – which have crossing sensors and low-level pedestrian signals – and pedex crossings, which features pedestrian countdown timers; however, in Ireland, only pelican crossings are installed. Puffin crossings are rare. Cyclists are sometimes permitted to use pedestrian crossings, such as toucan crossings (so named because TWO user types CAN cross) and sparrow crossings.

=== Australia ===
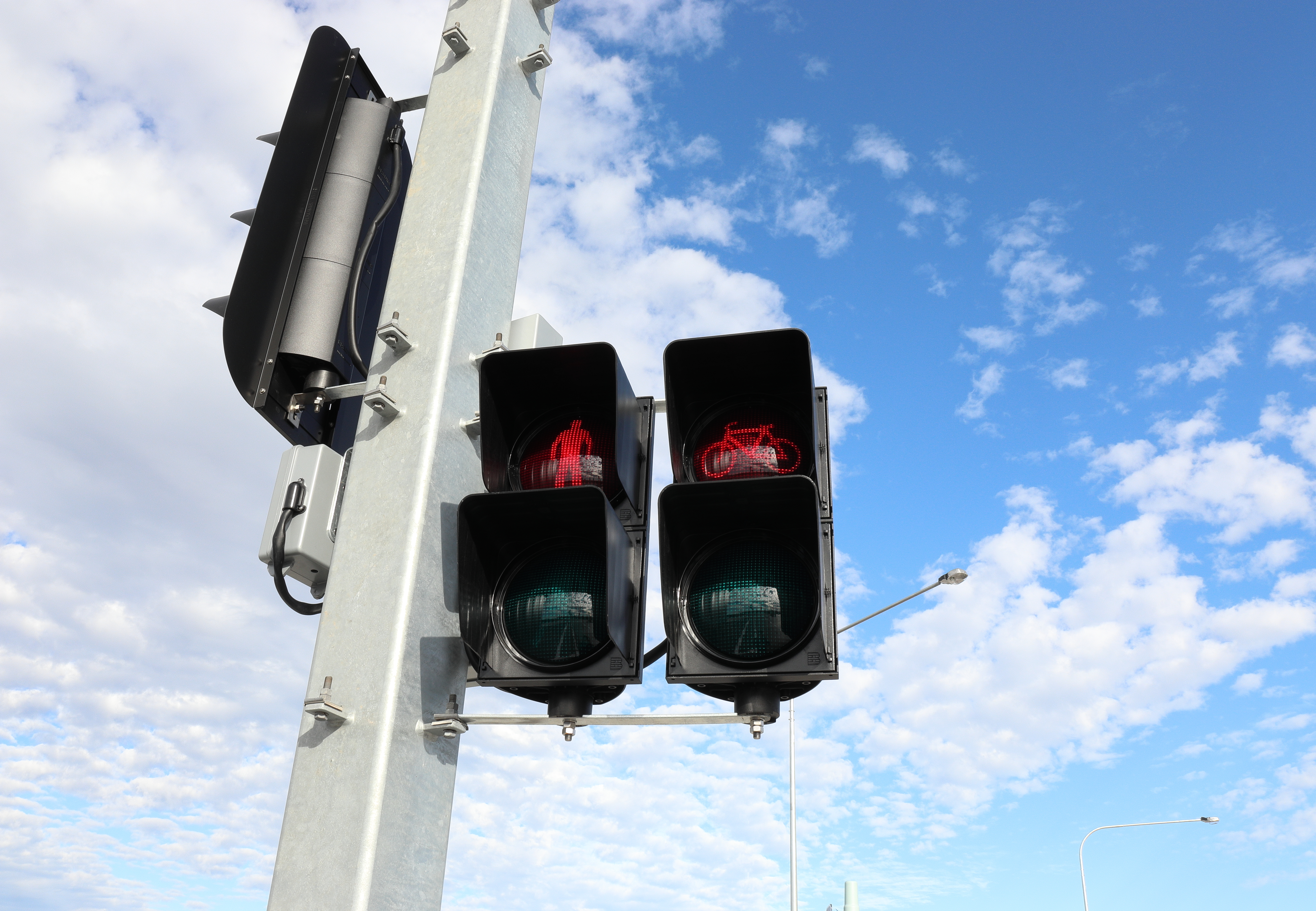
Crossing lamp/s used at a signalised intersection in Sydney, Australia

Pictograms are standard on all traffic light controlled crossings. Like some other countries, a flashing red sequence is used prior to steady red to clear pedestrians. Moments after, in some instances, a flashing yellow sequence (for motorists) can begin indicating that the vehicles may proceed through the crossing if safe to do so; this is fairly uncommon, however.

There are two distinctive types of crossings in Australia: marked foot crossings and pedestrian crossing (also called zebra crossings).

Marked foot crossings consist on two parallel broken white lines indicating where pedestrians must cross with pedestrian lights facing pedestrians and traffic lights facing drivers. These crossings are located at intersections with signals and may also be located between intersections. On most Australian foot crossings, PB/5 Audio-Tactile Pedestrian Detector push buttons are provided to allow pedestrians to request the green walk (green symbol) display.

On the other hand, zebra crossings are common in low traffic areas and their approaches may be marked by zigzag lines. When a pedestrian crossing is placed on a raised section of road they are known as wombat crossings and are usually accompanied by a 40km/h speed limit. Pedestrian crossings can have a yellow sign showing a pair of legs to indicate pedestrian priority. Children’s crossings are part-time crossings that usually operate during school zone hours, and at other approved times and locations, marked by red‑orange flags at both sides. Reflector signposting is also used at crossings in school zones.

== Signals ==
=== Pedestrian call buttons ===
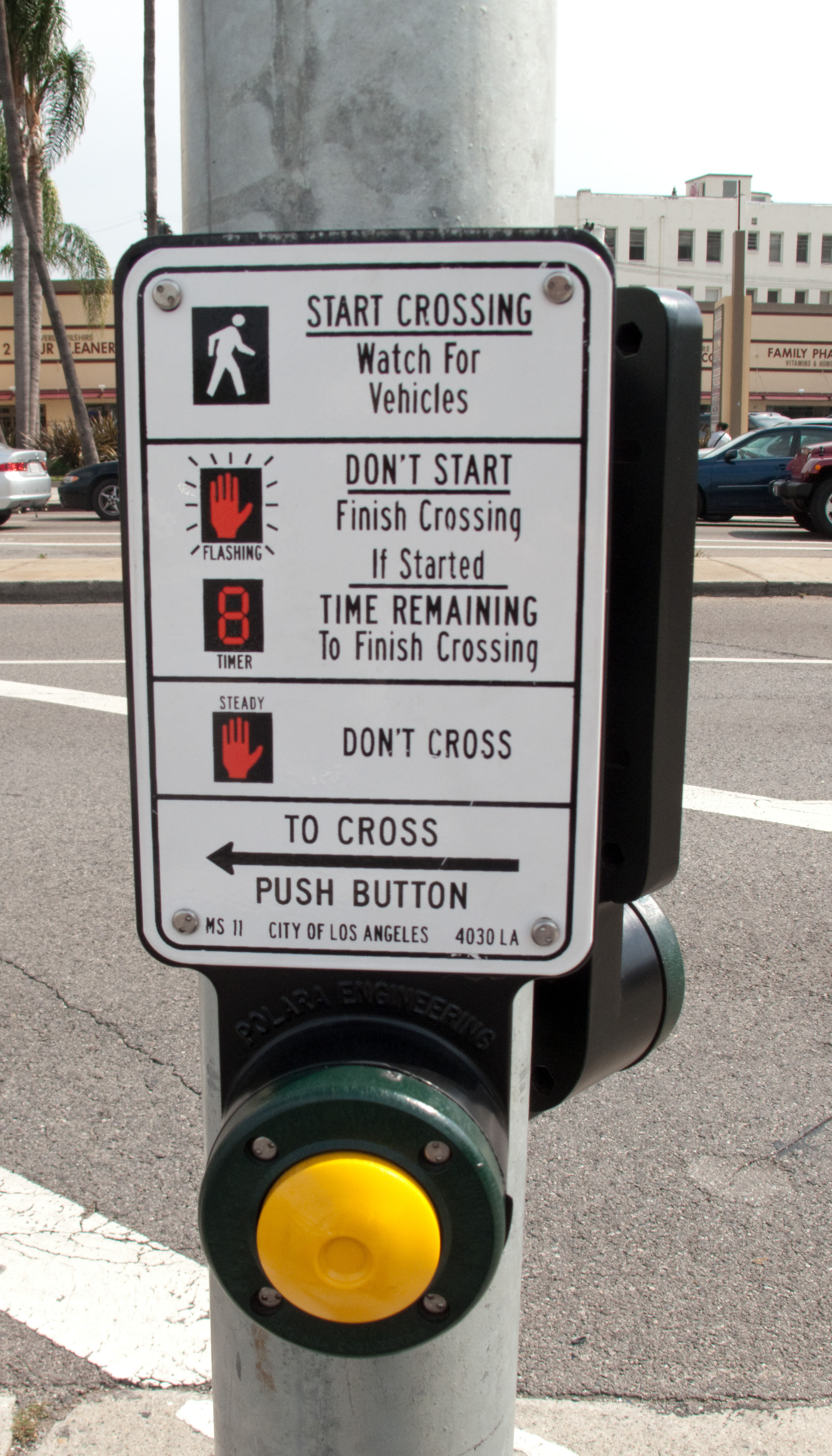
A pedestrian call button

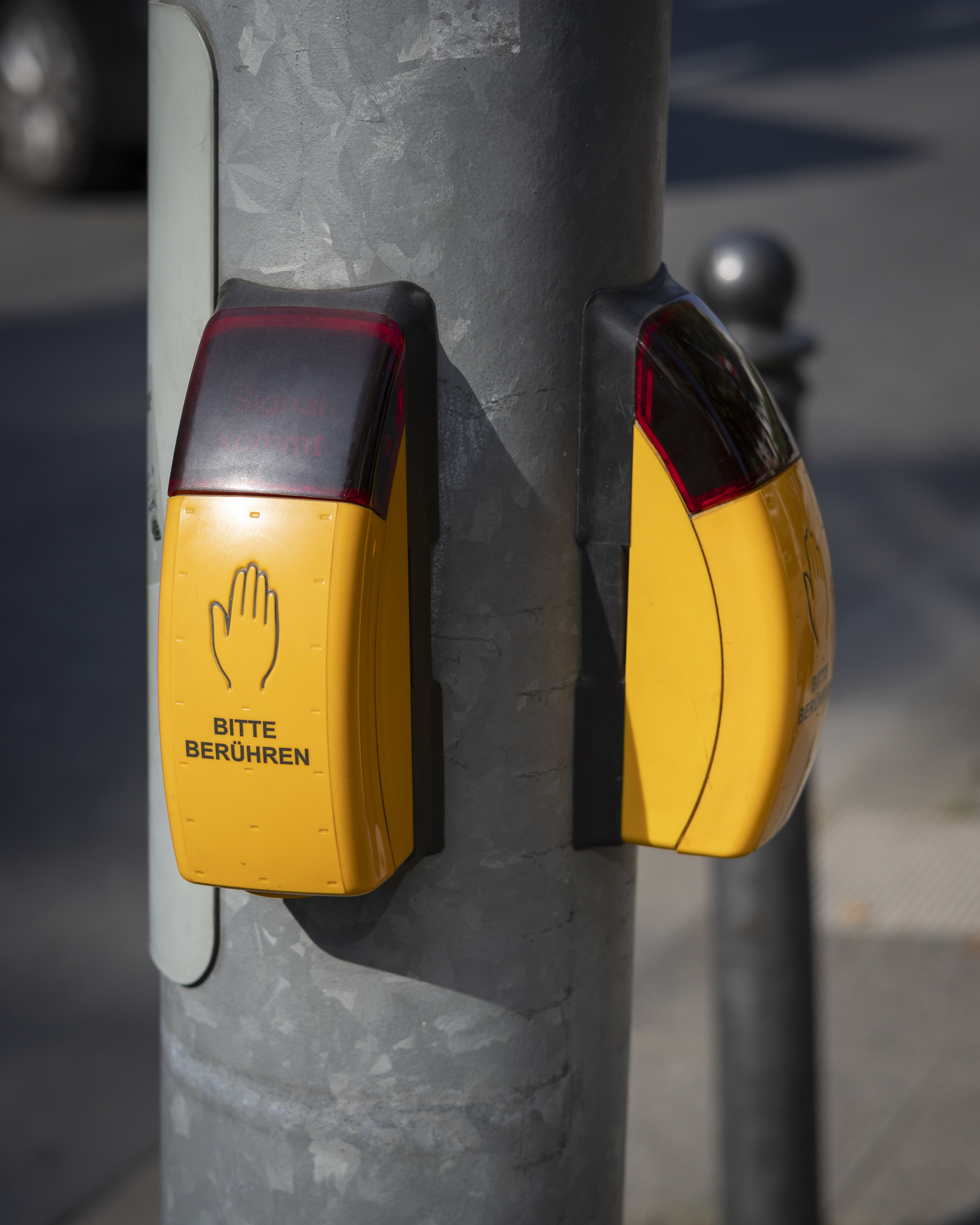
Pedestrian crossing push buttons in Wiesbaden, Germany

Pedestrian call buttons (also known as pedestrian push buttons or pedestrian beg buttons) are installed at traffic lights with a dedicated pedestrian signal, and are used to bring up the pedestrian "walk" indication in locations where they function correctly. In the majority of locations where call buttons are installed, pushing the button does not light up the pedestrian walk sign immediately. One Portland State University researcher notes of call buttons in the US, "Most [call] buttons don't provide any feedback to the pedestrian that the traffic signal has received the input. It may appear at many locations that nothing happens." However, there are some locations where call buttons do provide confirmation feedback. At such locations, pedestrians are more likely to wait for the "walk" indications.

Reports suggest that many walk buttons in some areas, such as New York City and the United Kingdom, may actually be either placebo buttons or nonworking call buttons that used to function correctly. In the former case, these buttons are designed to give pedestrians an illusion of control while the crossing signal continues its operation as programmed. However, in instances of the latter case, such as New York City's, the buttons were simply deactivated when traffic signals were updated to automatically include pedestrian phases as part of every signal cycle. In such instances these buttons may be removed during future updates to the pedestrian signals. In the United Kingdom, pressing a button at a standalone pedestrian crossing that is unconnected to a junction will turn a traffic light red immediately, but this is not necessarily the case at a junction.

Sometimes, call buttons work only at some intersections, at certain times of day, or certain periods of the year, such as in New York City or in Boston, Massachusetts. In Boston, some busy intersections are programmed to give a pedestrian cycle during certain times of day (so pushing the button is not necessary) but at off-peak times a button push is required to get a pedestrian cycle. In neighboring Cambridge, a button press is always required if a button is available, though the city prefers to build signals where no button is present and the pedestrian cycle always happens between short car cycles. In both cases the light will not turn immediately, but will wait until the next available pedestrian slot in a pre-determined rotation.

=== Countdown timers ===
Count down traffic light

Some pedestrian signals integrate a countdown timer, showing how many seconds are remaining for the clearing phase. In the United States, San Francisco was the first major city to install countdown signals to replace older pedestrian modules, doing so on a trial basis starting in March 2001. The United States MUTCD added a countdown signal as an optional feature to its 2003 edition; if included, the countdown digits would be Portland Orange, the same color as the "Upraised Hand" indication. The MUTCD's 2009 edition changed countdown timers to a mandatory feature on pedestrian signals at all signalized intersections with pedestrian clearance intervals ("flashing upraised hand" phases) longer than seven seconds. With the MUTCD guideline allotting at least one second to cross 3 feet (0.91 m), this indicates that countdown timers are supposed to be installed on roads wider than 21 feet (6.4 m). The countdown is not supposed to be displayed during the pedestrian "walk" interval ("steady walking person" phase).

Some municipalities have found that there are instances where pedestrian countdown signals may be less effective than standard hand/man or "walk"/"dont walk" signals. New York City started studying the pedestrian timers in an inconclusive 2006 study but only started rolling out pedestrian timers on a large scale in 2011 after the conclusion of a second study, which found that pedestrian countdown timers were ineffective at shorter crosswalks. Additionally, a 2000 study of pedestrian countdown timers in Lake Buena Vista, Florida, at several intersections near Walt Disney World, found that pedestrians were more likely to cross the street during the pedestrian clearance interval (flashing upraised hand) if there is a timer present, compared to at intersections where there was no timer present. A study in Toronto found similar results to the Florida study, determining that countdown timers may actually cause more crashes than standard hand/person signals. However, other cities such as London found that countdown timers were effective, and New York City found that countdown signals worked mainly at longer crosswalks.

Pedestrian countdown signals are also used elsewhere around the world, such as in Buenos Aires, India, Mexico, Taiwan, and the United Arab Emirates. In Mexico City, the walking person moves their feet during the countdown. In Taiwan, all the crossings feature animated people called xiaolüren ("little green man"), who will walk faster immediately before the traffic signal will change. There is also always a countdown timer.

=== Variations ===
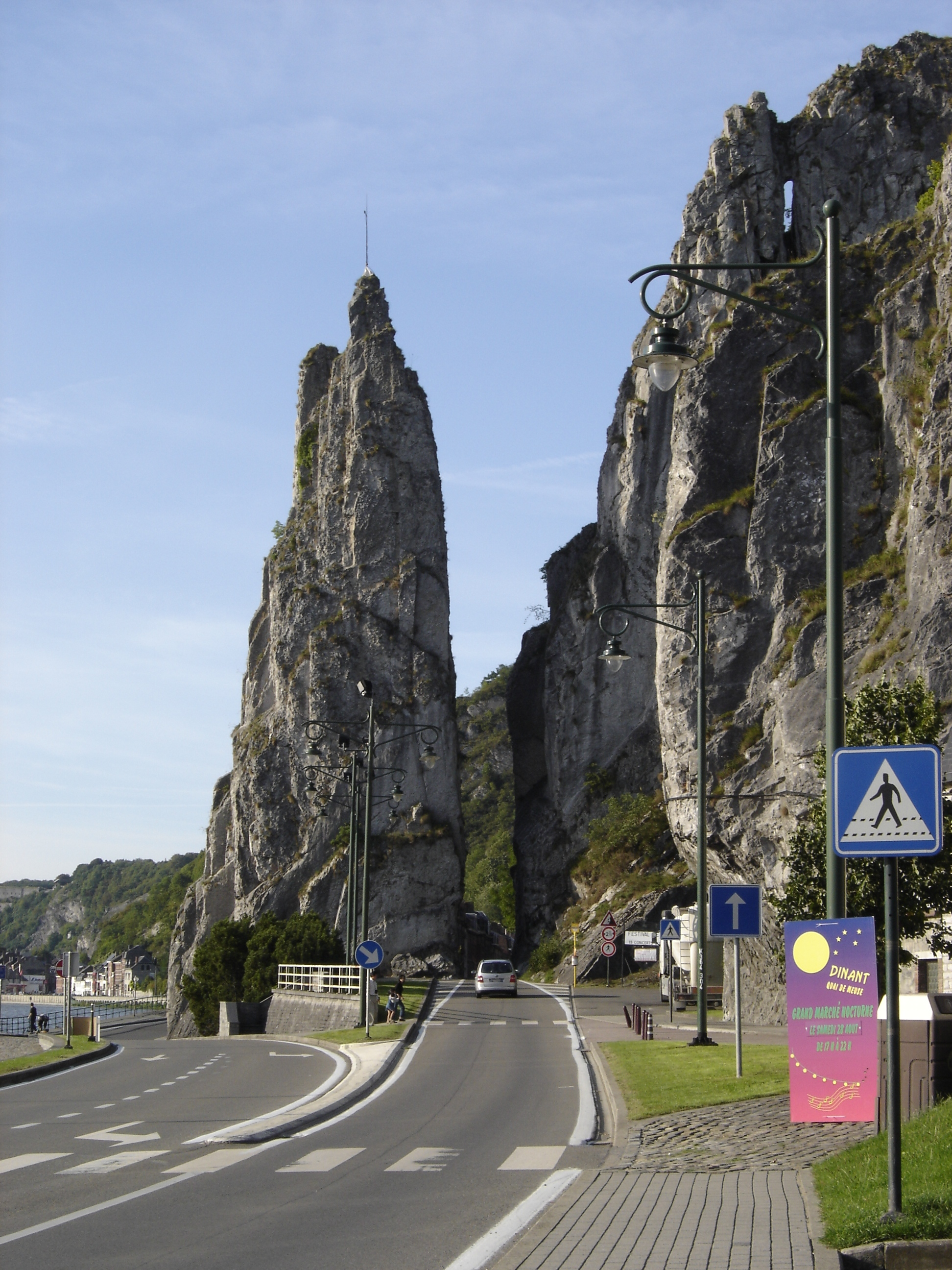
A pedestrian crossing with a Vienna Convention standard sign indicating to motorists that they must give priority to pedestrians using it

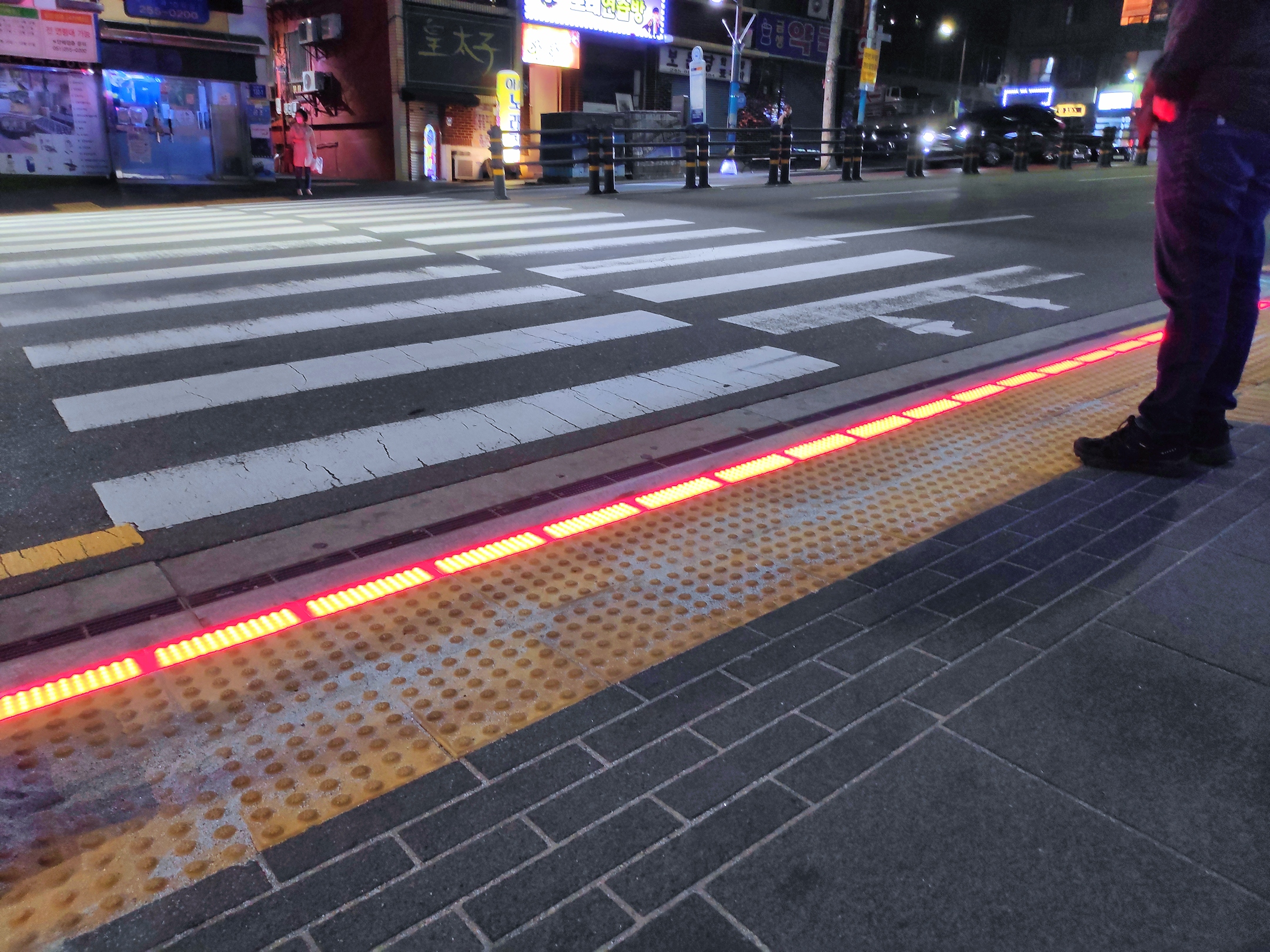
Light signals embedded in floor to improve mobile phone user safety

In some countries, instead of "don't walk", a depiction of a red person or hand indicating when not to cross, the drawing of the person crossing appears with an "X" drawn over it.

Some countries around the Baltic Sea in Scandinavia duplicate the red light. Instead of one red light, there are two which both illuminate at the same time.

In many parts of eastern Germany, particularly the former German Democratic Republic, the design of the crossing person (Ampelmännchen) has a hat. There are also female Ampelmännchen in western Germany and the Netherlands. Other countries also use unusual "walk" and "don't walk" pedestrian indicators. In southwest Yokohama, Kanagawa Prefecture, there are pedestrian signal lights that resemble Astro Boy. In Lisbon, some signals have a "don't walk" indicator that dances; these "dancing person" signals, created by Daimler AG, were created to encourage pedestrians to wait for the "walk" indicator, with the result that 81% more pedestrians stopped and waited for the "walk" light compared to at crosswalks with conventional signals.

=== Leading Pedestrian Interval ===
In some areas, the signal timing technique of a Leading Pedestrian Interval (LPI) allows pedestrians exclusive access to a crosswalk, typically 3–7 seconds, before vehicular traffic is permitted. Depending on intersection volume and safety history, a normal right-turn-on-red (RTOR) might be explicitly prohibited during the LPI phase. LPI benefits include increased visibility and greater likelihood of vehicles yielding. LPI is among the tools being considered in the fatality-elimination toolkit of Vision Zero planners and advocates.

An alternative to Leading Pedestrian Intervals is (temporally) protected pedestrian crossing phases, where turning vehicles are held at a red turn (filter) arrow signal during the walk (and optionally clearance) pedestrian interval, without blocking cars or transit vehicles proceeding ahead.

=== Temporary signals ===
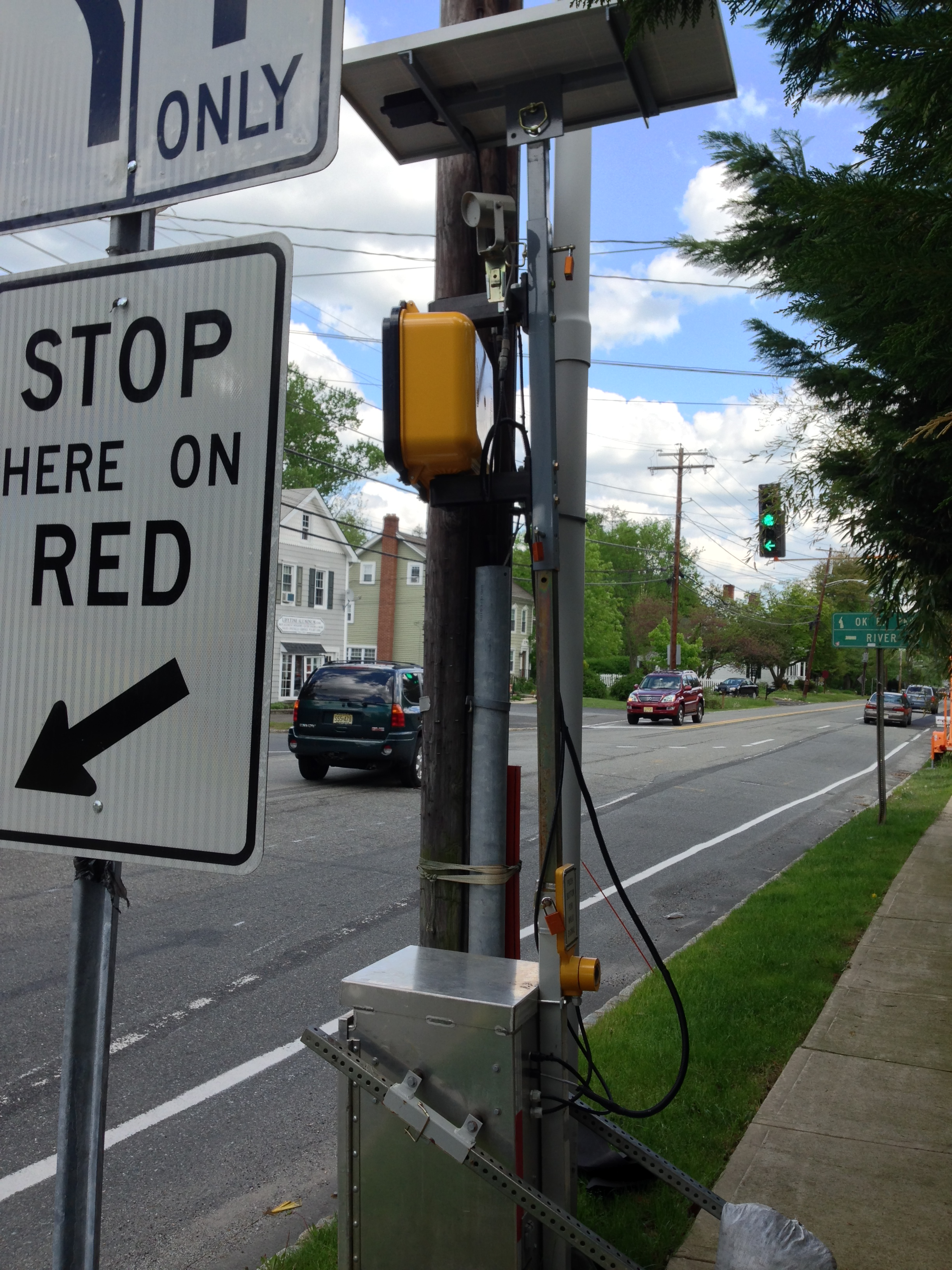
Portable pedestrian crossing signal at a road work site

In certain circumstances, there are needs to install temporary pedestrian crossing signals. The reasons may include redirecting traffic due to roadworks, closing of the permanent crossing signals due to repairs or upgrades, and establishing new pedestrian crossings for the duration of large public events.

The temporary pedestrian crossings can be integrated into portable traffic signals that may be used during the roadworks, or it can be stand-alone just to stop vehicles to allow pedestrians to safely cross the road without directing vehicle movements. When using the temporary pedestrian crossings signals for roadworks, there should be consideration on signal cycle time. The pedestrian crossing cycles may add longer delay to the traffics which may require additional planning on road work traffic flows.

Depending on the duration and the nature of the temporary signals, the equipment can be installed in different way. One way is to use the permanent traffic signals mounted temporary poles such as poles in concrete-filled barrels. Another way is to use portable pedestrian crossing signals.

== Enhancements for disabled people ==
Pedestrian controlled crossings are sometimes provided with enhanced features to assist disabled people.

=== Tactile paving ===
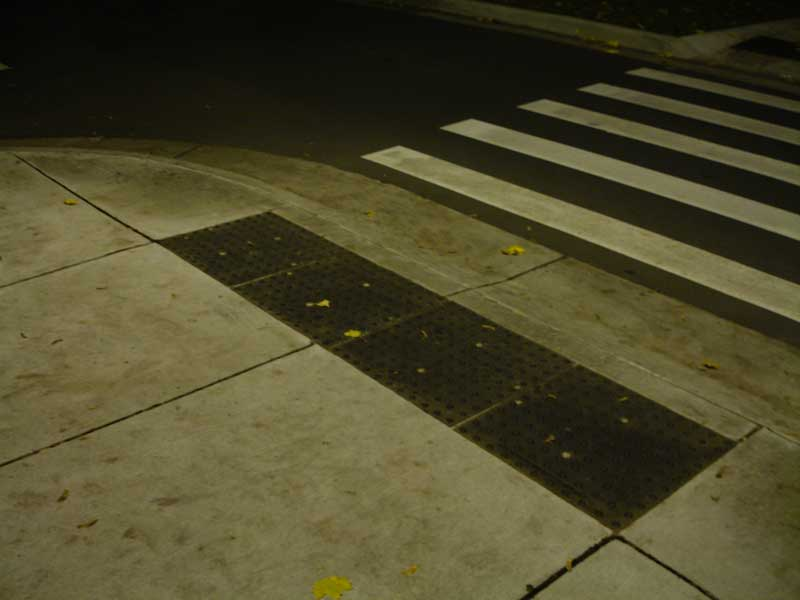
Tactile paving next to a crosswalk

Tactile surfacing patterns (or tactile pavings) may be laid flush within the adjacent footways (US: sidewalks), so that visually impaired pedestrians can locate the control box and cone device and know when they have reached the other side. In Britain, different colours of tactile paving indicate different types of crossings; yellow (referred to as buff coloured) is used at non-controlled (no signals) crossings, and red is used at controlled (signalised) locations.

=== Tactile feedback ===
Tactile cones near or under the control button may rotate or shake when the pedestrian signal is in the pedestrian "walk" phase. This is for pedestrians with visual impairments. A vibrating button is used in Australia, Germany, some parts of the United States, Greece, Ireland, and Hong Kong to assist hearing-impaired people. Alternatively, electrostatic, touch-sensitive buttons require no force to activate. To confirm that a request has been registered, the buttons usually emit a chirp or other sound. They also offer anti-vandalism benefits due to not including moving parts which are sometimes jammed on traditional push-button units.

The Australian PB/5 crosswalk button has a tactile response panel on the upper face vibrating to indicate when to cross.

=== Audible signals ===
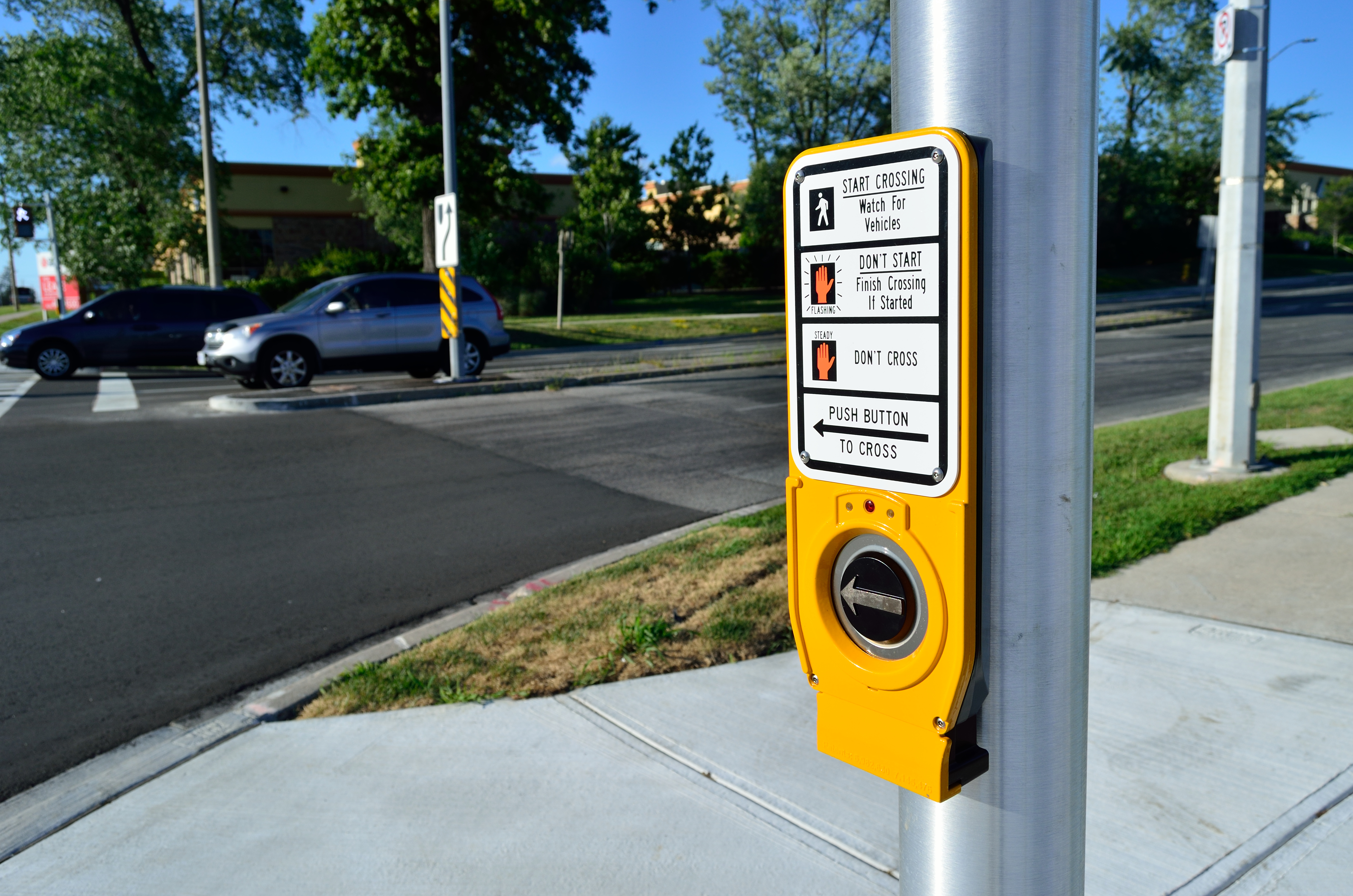
An accessible pedestrian signal which is used in the US and Canada

Crosswalks have adaptations, mainly for people with visual impairments, through the addition of accessible pedestrian signals (APS) that may include speakers at the pushbutton, or under the signal display, for each crossing location. These types of signals have been shown to reduce conflicts between pedestrians and vehicles. However, without other indications such as tactile pavings or cones, these APS units may be hard for visually impaired people to locate.

In the United States, the standards in the 2009 MUTCD require APS units to have a pushbutton locator tone, audible and vibrotactile walk indications, a tactile arrow aligned with the direction of travel on the crosswalk, and to adjust their volume in response to ambient sound. The pushbutton locator tone is a beep or tick, repeating at once per second, to allow people who are blind to find the device. If APS units are installed in more than one crossing direction (e.g. if there are APS units at a curb for both the north–south and west–east crossing directions), different sounds or speech messages may be used for each direction. Under the MUTCD guideline, the walk indication may be a speech message if two or more units on the same curb are separated by less than 10 feet (3.0 m). These speech messages usually follow the pattern "[Street name]. Walk sign is on to cross [Street Name]." Otherwise, the walk indication may be a "percussive tone", which usually consists of repeated, rapid sounds that can be clearly heard from the opposite curb and can oscillate between high and low volumes. In both cases, when the "don't walk" indication is flashing, the device will beep at every second until the "don't walk" indication becomes steady and the pedestrian countdown indication reaches "0", at which point the device will beep intermittently at lower volume. When activated, the APS units are mandated to be accompanied by a vibrating arrow on the APS during the walk signal.

The devices have been in existence since the mid-20th century, but were not popular until the 2000s because of concerns over noise. As of the 2009 MUTCD, APS are supposed to be set to be heard only 6 to 12 feet from the device to be easy to detect from a close distance but not so loud as to be intrusive to neighboring properties. Among American cities, San Francisco has one of the greatest numbers of APS-equipped intersections in the United States, with APS installed at 202 intersections as of October 2016. New York City has APS at 131 intersections as of November 2015, with 75 more intersections to be equipped every year after that.

Pedestrian sound signal in Sweden. During the first 9 seconds, the slow don't walk signal is heard. Then the button is pressed, sounding a beep. Soon after this, the faster walk signal is heard.

APS in other countries may consist of a short recorded message, as in Scotland, Hong Kong, Singapore and some parts of Canada (moderate to large urban centres). In Japan, various electronic melodies are played, often of traditional melancholic folk songs such as "Tōryanse" or "Sakura". In Croatia, Denmark Israel, Sweden, and Hong Kong, beeps (or clicks) with long intervals in-between signifying "don't walk" mode and beeps with very short intervals signifying "walk" mode; however, the standards differ by the implementing country (for example, the intervals between clicks in Hong Kong, for both "walk" mode and "don't walk" mode, are shorter than the corresponding intervals in Sweden).

=== Relief symbols ===
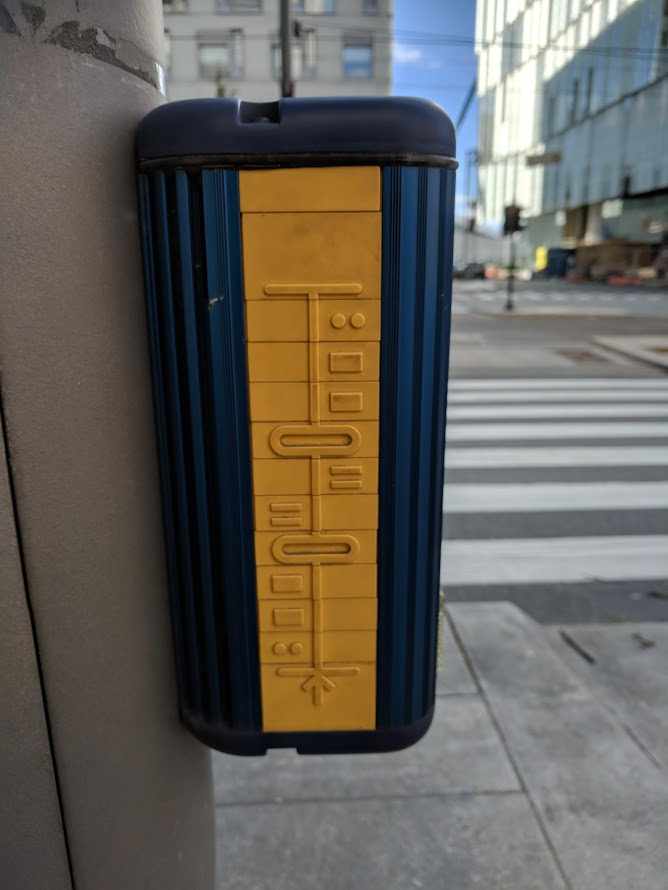
Tactile representation of a street crossing in Oslo showing (starting at the bottom) that the crossing consists of a curb, a bicycle lane, two lanes of traffic, a pedestrian island, two tram tracks, another island, then three more traffic lanes.

On some pushbuttons especially in Austria and Germany there is a symbolic relief showing the crossing situation for the visually impaired, so they can get an overview of the crossing.

The relief is read from the bottom up. It consists of different modules, which are put together according to the crosswalk. Each pedestrian crossing begins with the start symbol, consisting of an arrow and a broad line representing the curb. Subsequently, different modules for traffic lanes and islands follow. The relief is completed with a broad line.

Modules for traffic lanes consist of a dash in the middle and a symbol for the kind of lane right or left of the dash, depending on the direction from which the traffic crosses the crossing. If a crossing is possible from both directions, a symbol is located on both sides. If the pedestrian crossing is a zebra crossing, the middle line is dashed. A traffic light secured crossing has a solid line.

A cycle path is represented by two points next to each other, a vehicle lane by a rectangle and tram rails by two lines lying one above the other.

Islands are represented as a rectangle, which has semicircles on the right and left side. If there is a pushbutton for pedestrians on the island, there is a dot in the middle of the rectangle. If the pedestrian walkway divides on an island, the rectangle may be open on the right or left side.

Symbol	securing	type	direction
alternativtext=End of crossing		End	
alternativtext=Bidirectional cycle path in crosswalk	zebra crossing	cycle path	bidirectional
alternativtext=Cycle path from the right in a zebra crossing	zebra crossing	cycle path	right
alternativtext=vehicle lane from the right in a zebra crossing	zebra crossing	vehicle lane	right
alternativtext=Tram tracksfrom the right in a zebra crossing	zebra crossing	tram tracks	right
alternativtext=Left open island with pushbutton		island with pushbutton	open to the left
alternativtext=island with pushbutton		island with pushbutton	
alternativtext=island		island	
alternativtext=tram tracks from the left of a traffic light	traffic light	tram tracks	left
alternativtext=vehicle lane from the left of a traffic light	traffic light	vehicle lane	left
alternativtext=cycle path from the left of a traffic light	traffic light	cycle path	left
alternativtext=Two-way cycle path of a traffic light	traffic lights	cycle path	bidirectional
alternativtext=start		Start	

The Australian PB/5 crosswalk button has an embossed arrow to indicate the direction of the crossing (intended to function in conjunction with tactile paving.

=== Key-based system ===
In Perth, Western Australia, an extended phase system called "Keywalk" was developed by the Main Roads Department of Western Australia in response to concerns from disability advocates about the widening of the Albany Highway in that city in the mid-1990s. The department felt that extending the walk phase permanently on cross streets would cause too much disruption to traffic flow on the highway and so the Keywalk system was developed to allow for those who needed an extended green light phase to cross the road safely. A small electronic key adjusted the green/walk and flashing red/complete crossing phases to allow more time for the key holder to complete the crossing of the highway safely. The system was first installed at the junction of Albany Highway and Cecil Avenue. It is unclear what became of this system.

In Singapore, a system called Green Man+ has been installed. This system enables a longer green time for elderly pedestrians (over 60 years old) or people with a disability. Green duration is extended by 3 to 13 seconds depending on the crossing width. Identification cards are required to be tapped onto a reader mounted above signal push buttons. Green light duration is otherwise fixed and pre-determined.

== Lighting ==
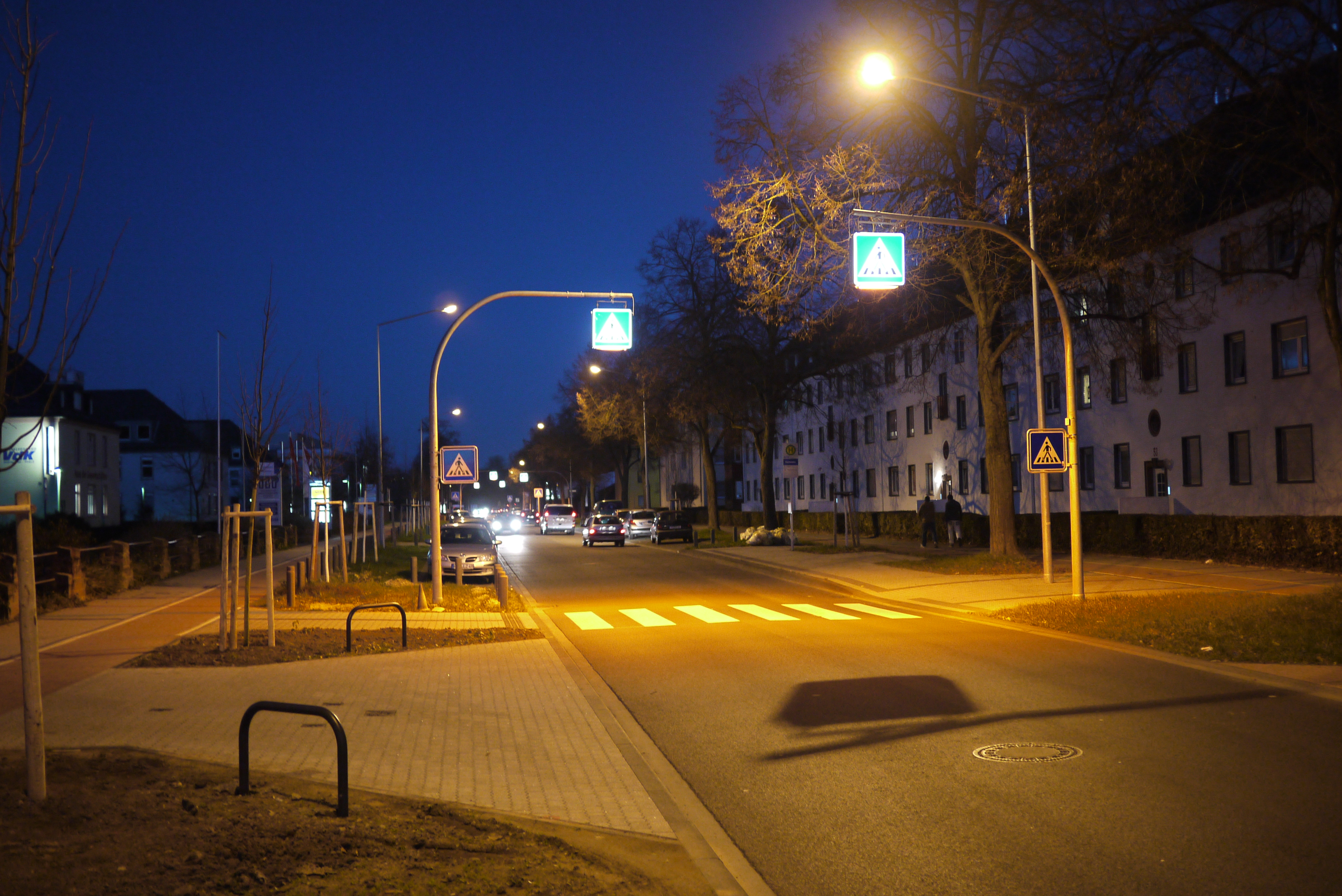
Crosswalk with overhead lighting, and internally illuminated overhead crosswalk signs in Germany

There are two types of crosswalk lights: those that illuminate the whole crosswalk area, and warning lights. Both these lighting systems encourage oncoming traffic to yield for pedestrians only if necessary.

The Illuminating Engineering Society of North America currently provides engineering design standards for highway lighting. In the US, in conventional intersections, area lighting is typically provided by pole-mounted luminaires. These systems illuminate the crosswalk as well as surrounding areas, and do not always provide enough contrast between the pedestrian and his or her background.

There have been many efforts to create lighting scenarios that offer better nighttime illumination in crosswalks. Some innovative concepts include:

=== Illuminating lights ===
- Bollard posts containing linear light sources inside. These posts have been shown to sufficiently illuminate the pedestrian but not the background, consequently increasing contrast and improving pedestrian visibility and detection. Although this method shows promise in being incorporated into crosswalk lighting standards, more studies need to be done.
- Festooned strings of light over the top of the crosswalk.

=== Warning lights ===
To warn the oncoming traffic, these warning lights usually only rapidly flash when a pedestrian presses a button to use the crosswalk.

- In-pavement lighting oriented to face oncoming traffic (Embedded pavement flashing-light system).
- In-pavement, flashing warning lights oriented upwards (especially visible to children, the short-statured, and smartphone users)
- Pole-mounted, flashing warning lights (mounted similar to a traffic signal).
- Pedestrian warning signs enhanced with LED lights either within the sign face or underneath it.

In areas with heavy snowfall, using in-pavement lighting can be problematic, since snow can obscure the lights, and snowplows can damage them.

== Railway pedestrian crossings ==
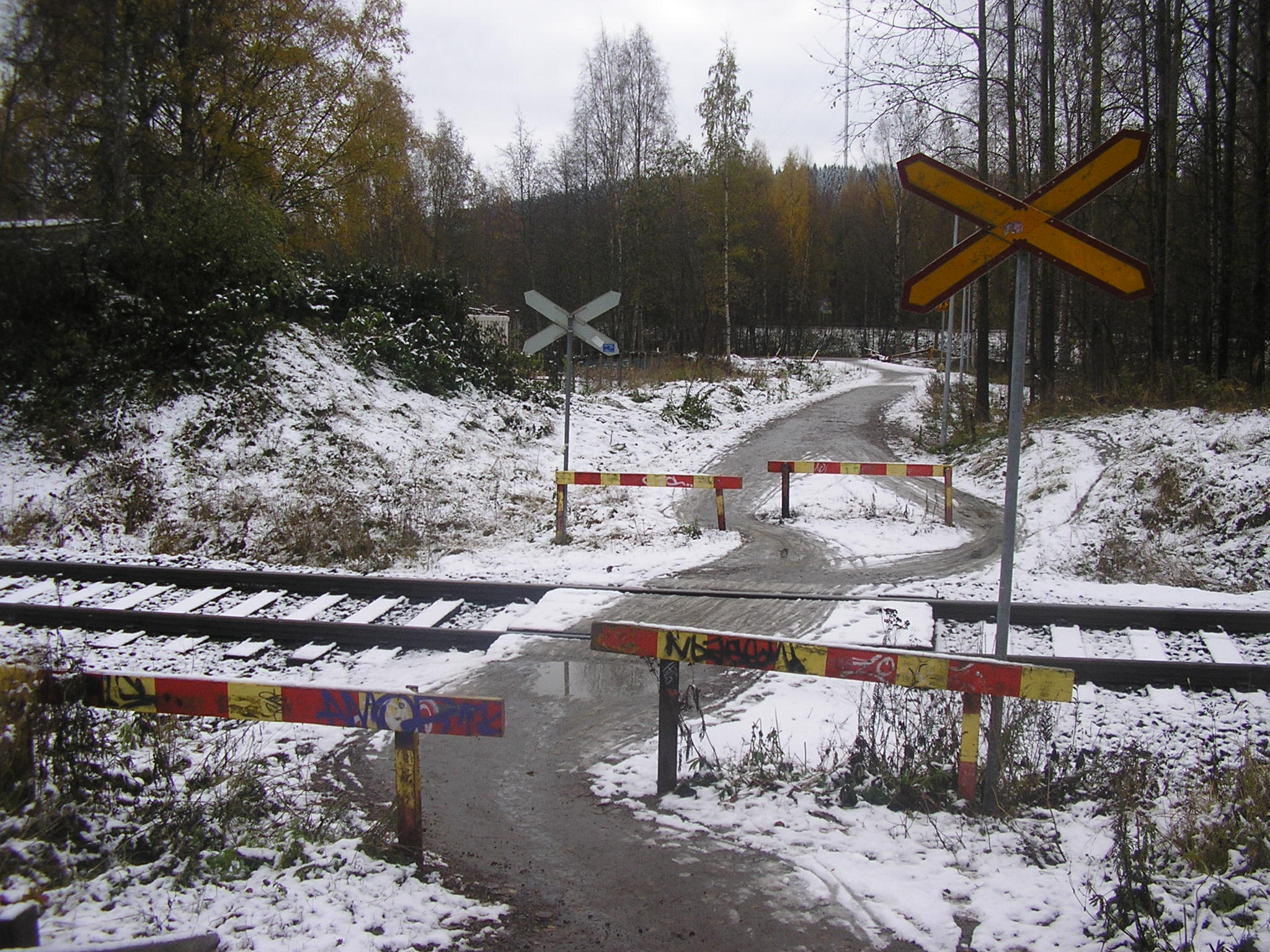
A railway pedestrian crossing in Jyväskylä, Finland

In Finland, fences in the footpath approaching the crossing force pedestrians and bicycles to slow down to navigate a zigzag path, which also tends to force that user to look out for the train.

Pedestrian crossings across railways may be arranged differently elsewhere, such as in New South Wales, where they consist of:

- a barrier which closes when a train approaches;
- a "Red Man" light; no light when no train approaching
- an alarm

In France, when a train is approaching, a red person is shown with the word STOP flashing in red (R25 signal).

When a footpath crosses a railway in the United Kingdom, there will most often be gates or stiles protecting the crossing from wildlife and livestock. In situations where there is little visibility along the railway, or the footpath is especially busy, there will also be a small set of lights with an explanatory sign. When a train approaches, the signal light will change to red and an alarm will sound until the train has cleared the crossing.

== Safety ==
The safety of unsignalled pedestrian or zebra crossings is somewhat contested in traffic engineering circles.

Research undertaken in New Zealand showed that a zebra crossing without other safety features on average increases pedestrian crashes by 28% compared to a location without crossings. However, if combined with (placed on top of) a speed table, zebra crossings were found to reduce pedestrian crashes by 80%.

A five-year U.S. study of 1,000 marked crosswalks and 1,000 unmarked comparison sites found that on most roads, the difference in safety performance of marked and unmarked crossings is not statistically significant, unless additional safety features are used. On multilane roads carrying over 12,000 vehicles per day, a marked crosswalk is likely to have worse safety performance than an otherwise similar unmarked location, unless safety features such as raised median refuges or pedestrian beacons are also installed. On multilane roads carrying over 15,000 vehicles per day, a marked crosswalk is likely to have worse safety performance than an unmarked location, even if raised median refuges are provided. The marking pattern had no significant effect on safety. This study only included locations where vehicle traffic was not controlled by a signal or stop sign.

Traffic accidents are reduced when intersections are daylighted, i.e. visibility increased such as by removing adjacent parked cars.

Smart pedestrian crossings, also known as active signage systems, utilize automated flashing lights triggered by infrared and motion sensors to warn drivers of pedestrians ahead. A 2021 study found that such systems reduced average vehicle speeds by approximately 2.6 km/h on arterial roads and 3.5 km/h on collector roads. The same study documented a 77.4% increase in driver yielding rates and a 25.2% decrease in pedestrian waiting times. Notably, there were also measurable reductions in the probability of fatal or serious injuries—up to 9.4% on arterial roads immediately after installation and up to 31.7% on collector roads after one year.

== See also ==
- Footpath
- Road surface marking
- Stile
- The Greenwalking
- Traffic light
- Pedestrian crossing flag
