= Lady Parry Island =

Island in Nunavut, Canada

- Location within Nunavut Location within Canada

Geography
- Location: Gulf of Boothia
- Coordinates: 70°11′N 090°45′W
- Archipelago: Arctic Archipelago

Administration
- Canada
- Territory: Nunavut
- Region: Kitikmeot

Demographics
- Population: Uninhabited

Lady Parry Island is an uninhabited island in Nunavut, Canada. It is located within the Kitikmeot Region's side of the Gulf of Boothia. It is east of the mainland's Boothia Peninsula, northwest of Hecla and Fury Islands.

It is named after Isabella Louisa Stanley, of Alderly, wife of Arctic explorer, Sir William Edward Parry.
