= Deaths of Mark and Jacob Iskander =

2020 deaths of two brothers in a traffic collision in Westlake Village, California

The deaths of Mark and Jacob Iskander occurred on September 29, 2020, when brothers Mark Iskander, 11, and Jacob Iskander, 8, were struck by a vehicle while crossing Triunfo Canyon Road in a marked crosswalk in Westlake Village, California. The vehicle was driven by Rebecca Grossman, co-founder of the Grossman Burn Foundation. Mark died at the scene and Jacob died later at a hospital.

Grossman was charged with two counts each of murder and vehicular manslaughter with gross negligence, as well as one count of hit-and-run driving resulting in death. In February 2024, a Los Angeles County jury convicted her on all five counts. She was sentenced in June 2024 to 15 years to life in prison. A California appellate court upheld the convictions in March 2026.

The deaths also led to a civil lawsuit against Grossman and former Major League Baseball pitcher Scott Erickson. In June 2026, a jury found both Grossman and Erickson liable and awarded the Iskander family $176 million in compensatory damages. The jury subsequently awarded an additional $22.17 million in punitive damages, $21 million against Grossman and $1.17 million against Erickson.

The collision also prompted renewed attention to pedestrian safety at the Triunfo Canyon Road and Saddle Mountain Drive crossing. Westlake Village subsequently installed a pedestrian hybrid beacon at the crosswalk, which became operational in January 2022.

== Collision ==
On the evening of September 29, 2020, Mark and Jacob Iskander were crossing Triunfo Canyon Road at Saddle Mountain Drive with members of their family. The intersection had a marked crosswalk but no traffic signal.

Grossman was driving a white Mercedes-Benz sport utility vehicle on Triunfo Canyon Road. Evidence presented during her criminal case showed that the vehicle's data recorder registered a speed of as much as 81 mph before Grossman braked, reducing the vehicle's speed to approximately 73 mph shortly before the collision. The posted speed limit was 45 mph.

The vehicle struck Mark and Jacob in the crosswalk. Mark died at the scene. Jacob was taken to a hospital, where he died several hours later. Grossman's vehicle continued beyond the intersection and stopped farther down the road after its engine shut down.

== Investigation and charges ==
Grossman was arrested following the collision. In December 2020, the Los Angeles County District Attorney charged her with two felony counts of murder, two felony counts of vehicular manslaughter with gross negligence, and one felony count of hit-and-run driving resulting in death. She pleaded not guilty.

In January 2021, prosecutors also charged Erickson, who had been driving another vehicle on Triunfo Canyon Road shortly before the collision, with misdemeanor reckless driving. Prosecutors alleged that Erickson and Grossman had been driving recklessly before Grossman's vehicle struck the boys. Erickson denied that his driving contributed to the collision.

== Criminal trial ==
Grossman's criminal trial began in January 2024 in Los Angeles County Superior Court. Prosecutors argued that Grossman had been driving at excessive speed after drinking with Erickson before the collision. The defense disputed the prosecution's account of the collision and argued during the trial that another vehicle had struck the boys first.

On February 23, 2024, the jury found Grossman guilty of two counts of second-degree murder, two counts of vehicular manslaughter with gross negligence, and one count of hit-and-run driving resulting in death.

== Sentencing and appeal ==
On June 10, 2024, Superior Court Judge Joseph Brandolino sentenced Grossman to two concurrent terms of 15 years to life for the murder convictions. A three-year sentence for leaving the scene was also ordered to run concurrently.

Grossman appealed her convictions. On March 17, 2026, a three-judge panel of the California Court of Appeal upheld them.

== Civil litigation ==
The Iskander family brought a wrongful-death action arising from the collision. The case proceeded to trial in Los Angeles County Superior Court in 2026. Grossman and Erickson were among the defendants.

On June 3, 2026, the jury found Grossman and Erickson negligent and awarded the family $176 million in compensatory damages. The jury also found that Grossman and Erickson had acted with malice, allowing a separate punitive-damages phase of the trial.

On June 10, the jury awarded $22.17 million in punitive damages, ordering Grossman to pay $21 million and Erickson to pay $1.17 million. The awards brought the total damages to $198.17 million.

== Pedestrian safety and crosswalk changes ==
The deaths drew attention to pedestrian safety at the intersection of Triunfo Canyon Road and Saddle Mountain Drive. Westlake Village subsequently undertook a project to install a pedestrian hybrid beacon at the crossing.

The beacon became operational in January 2022. Unlike a conventional traffic signal, the beacon normally remains dark until activated by a pedestrian. Once activated, it uses a sequence of warning and stop indications requiring motorists to stop while pedestrians cross.

Questions about the safety of the crossing before the deaths later became an issue during the 2026 civil trial. Testimony addressed concerns that residents had raised about the crossing before the 2020 collision.

== See also ==
- Pedestrian safety
- Pedestrian crossing
- Pedestrian hybrid beacon
- Traffic calming
