= List of Tesla Autopilot crashes =

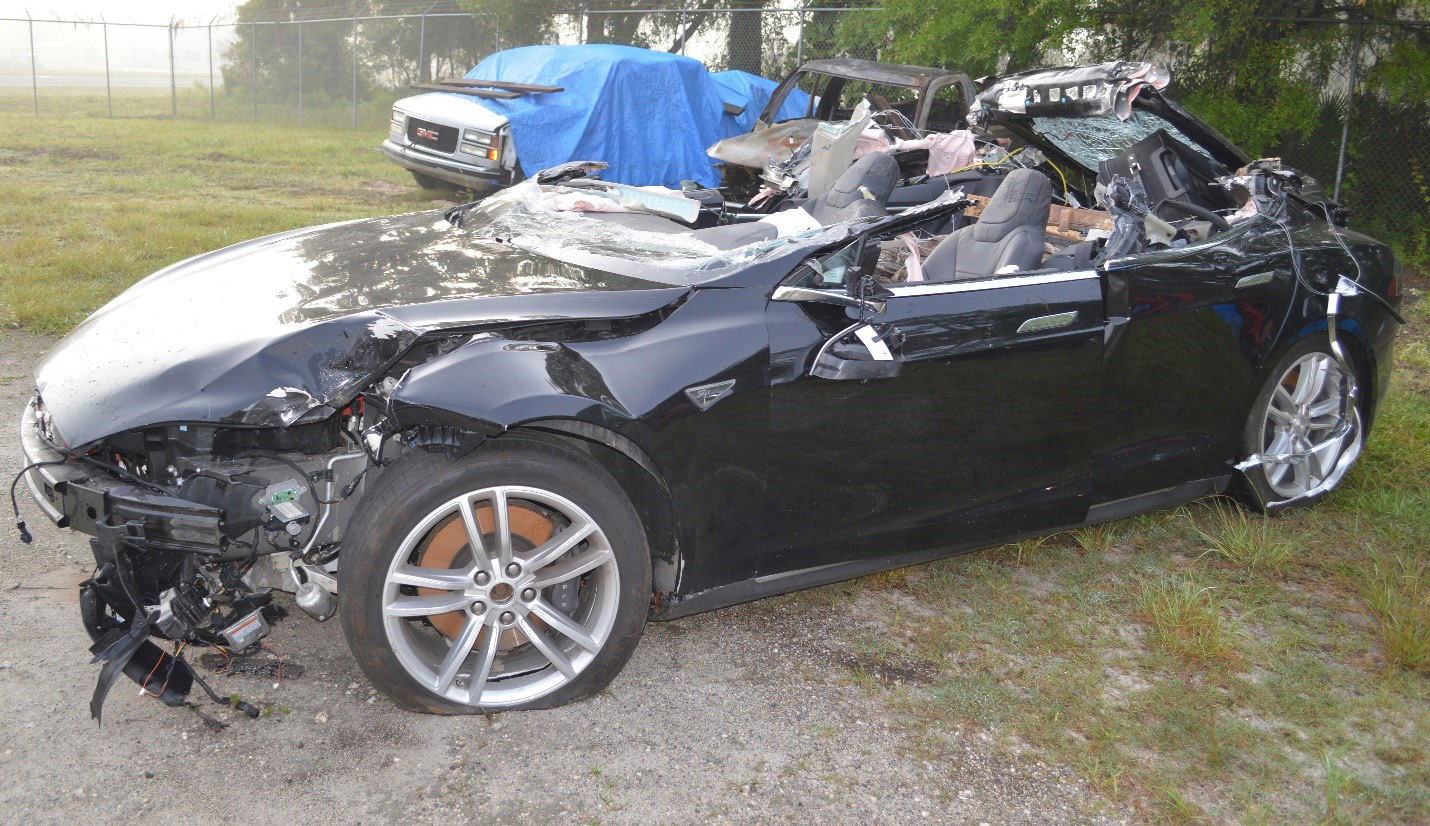
The Model S after it was recovered from the crash scene in Williston, Florida

Tesla Autopilot, a Level 2 advanced driver assistance system (ADAS), was released in October 2015 and the first fatal crashes involving the system occurred less than one year later. The fatal crashes attracted attention from news publications and United States government agencies, including the National Transportation Safety Board (NTSB) and National Highway Traffic Safety Administration (NHTSA), which has argued the Tesla Autopilot death rate is higher than the reported estimates. In addition to fatal crashes, there have been many nonfatal ones. Causes behind the incidents include the ADAS failing to recognize other vehicles, insufficient Autopilot driver engagement, and violating the operational design domain.

As of October 2025, there have been hundreds of nonfatal incidents involving versions of Autopilot and sixty-five reported fatalities, fifty-four of which NHTSA investigations or expert testimony later verified and two that NHTSA's Office of Defect Investigations determined as happening during the engagement of Full Self-Driving (FSD) after 2022. Collectively, these cases culminated in a general recall in December 2023 of all vehicles equipped with Autopilot, which Tesla claims it resolved by an over-the-air software update. Immediately after closing its investigation in April 2024, NHTSA opened a recall query to determine the effectiveness of the recall.

== Notable fatal crashes ==
=== Handan, Hebei, China (January 20, 2016) ===
On January 20, 2016, Gao Yaning, the driver of a Tesla Model S in Handan, Hebei, China, was killed when his car crashed into a stationary truck. The Tesla was following a car in the far left lane of a multi-lane highway; the car in front moved to the right lane to avoid a truck stopped on the left shoulder, and the Tesla, which the driver's father believes was in Autopilot mode, did not slow before colliding with the stopped truck. According to footage captured by a dashboard camera, the stationary street sweeper on the left side of the expressway partially extended into the far left lane, and the driver did not appear to respond to the unexpected obstacle.

Tesla accident in Handan, Hebei, China

Initially, Yaning was held responsible for the collision by local traffic police and, in September 2016, his family filed a lawsuit in July against the Tesla dealer who sold the car. The family's lawyer stated the suit was intended "to let the public know that self-driving technology has some defects. We are hoping Tesla when marketing its products, will be more cautious. Do not just use self-driving as a selling point for young people." Tesla released a statement which said they "have no way of knowing whether or not Autopilot was engaged at the time of the crash" since the car telemetry could not be retrieved remotely due to damage caused by the crash. In 2018, the lawsuit was stalled because telemetry was recorded locally to a SD card and was not able to be given to Tesla, who provided a decoding key to a third party for independent review. Tesla stated that "while the third-party appraisal is not yet complete, we have no reason to believe that Autopilot on this vehicle ever functioned other than as designed." Chinese media later reported that the family sent the information from that card to Tesla, which admitted Autopilot was engaged two minutes before the crash. Tesla since then removed the term "Autopilot" from its Chinese website.

=== Williston, Florida, US (May 7, 2016) ===
On May 7, 2016, Tesla driver Joshua Brown was killed in a crash with an 18-wheel tractor-trailer in Williston, Florida. By late June 2016, the NHTSA opened a formal investigation into the fatal autonomous accident, working with the Florida Highway Patrol. According to the NHTSA, preliminary reports indicate the crash occurred when the tractor-trailer made a left turn in front of the 2015 Tesla Model S at an intersection on a non-controlled access highway, and the car failed to apply the brakes. The car continued to travel after passing under the truck's trailer. The Tesla was eastbound in the rightmost lane of US 27, and the westbound tractor-trailer was turning left at the intersection with NE 140th Court, approximately 1 mi (1.6 km) west of Williston; the posted speed limit is 65 mph (105 km/h).

Tesla accident in Wllinston, Florida

The diagnostic log of the Tesla indicated it was traveling at a speed of 74 mi/h (119 km/h) when it collided with and traveled under the trailer, which was not equipped with a side underrun protection system. A reconstruction of the accident estimated the driver would have had approximately 10.4 seconds to detect the truck and take evasive action. The underride collision sheared off the Tesla's greenhouse, destroying everything above the beltline, and caused fatal injuries to the driver. In the approximately nine seconds after colliding with the trailer, the Tesla traveled another 886.5 feet (270.2 m) and came to rest after colliding with two chain-link fences and a utility pole.

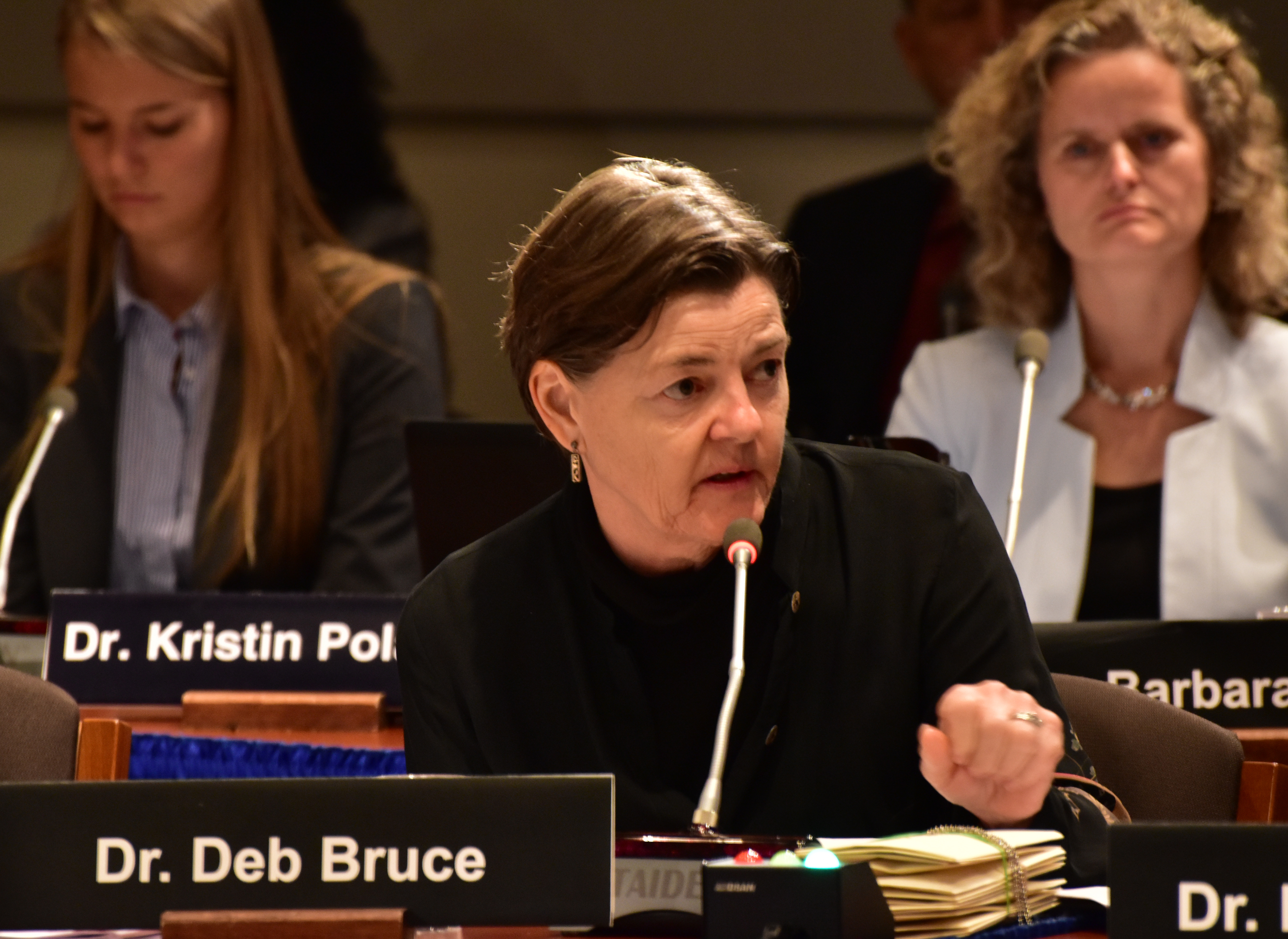
Dr. Deb Bruce, head of the NTSB investigation team, announces results to the NTSB on September 12, 2017.

The NHTSA's preliminary evaluation was opened to examine the design and performance of any automated driving systems in use at the time of the crash, which involves a population of an estimated 25,000 Model S cars. On July 8, 2016, the NHTSA requested Tesla Inc. to hand over to the agency detailed information about the design, operation and testing of its Autopilot technology. The agency also requested details of all design changes and updates to Autopilot since its introduction, and Tesla's planned updates scheduled for the next four months.

According to Tesla, "neither autopilot nor the driver noticed the white side of the tractor-trailer against a brightly lit sky, so the brake was not applied." The car attempted to drive full speed under the trailer, "with the bottom of the trailer impacting the windshield of the Model S". Tesla also stated that this was Tesla's first known Autopilot-related death in over 130 million miles (208 million km) driven by its customers while Autopilot was activated. According to Tesla there is a fatality every 94 million miles (150 million km) among all type of vehicles in the U.S. It is estimated that billions of miles will need to be traveled before Tesla Autopilot can claim to be safer than humans with statistical significance. Researchers say that Tesla and others need to release more data on the limitations and performance of automated driving systems if self-driving cars are to become safe and understood enough for mass-market use.

The truck's driver told the Associated Press that he could hear a Harry Potter movie playing in the crashed car, and said the car was driving so quickly that "he went so fast through my trailer I didn't see him. [The film] was still playing when he died and snapped a telephone pole a quarter-mile down the road." According to the Florida Highway Patrol, they found in the wreckage an aftermarket portable DVD player. (It is not possible to watch videos on the Model S touchscreen display while the car is moving.) A laptop computer was recovered during the post-crash examination of the wreck, along with an adjustable vehicle laptop mount attached to the front passenger's seat frame. The NHTSA concluded the laptop was probably mounted, and the driver may have been distracted at the time of the crash.

Tesla's manufacture of cars equipped with Autopilot preceded NHTSA's issuance of its [Federal Automated Vehicles] Policy [dated September 2016], and that policy applies to SAE Levels 3–5 rather than Level 2 automated vehicles, but Tesla clearly understands the [ operational design domain ] concept and advised drivers to use the Autopilot systems only on limited-access roadways. Following the crash, Tesla modified its Autopilot firmware to add a preferred road usage constraint, which affects the timing of the hands-off driving alert. But despite these modifications, a Tesla driver can still operate Autopilot on any roads with adequate lane markings.

— Collision Between a Car Operating With Automated Vehicle Control Systems and a Tractor-Semitrailer Truck Near Williston, Florida | May 7, 2017 | Accident Report NTSB/HAR-17/02 PB2017-102600

In January 2017, the NHTSA Office of Defects Investigations (ODI) released a preliminary evaluation, finding that the driver in the crash had seven seconds to see the truck and identifying no defects in the Autopilot system; the ODI also found that the Tesla car crash rate dropped by 40 percent after Autosteer installation, but later also clarified that it did not assess the effectiveness of this technology or whether it was engaged in its crash rate comparison. The NHTSA Special Crash Investigation team published its report in January 2018. According to the report, for the drive leading up to the crash, the driver engaged Autopilot for 37 minutes and 26 seconds, and the system provided 13 "hands not detected" alerts, to which the driver responded after an average delay of 16 seconds. The report concluded "Regardless of the operational status of the Tesla's ADAS technologies, the driver was still responsible for maintaining ultimate control of the vehicle. All evidence and data gathered concluded that the driver neglected to maintain complete control of the Tesla leading up to the crash."

In July 2016, the NTSB announced it had opened a formal investigation into the fatal accident while Autopilot was engaged. The NTSB is an investigative body that only has the power to make policy recommendations. An agency spokesman said, "It's worth taking a look and seeing what we can learn from that event, so that as that automation is more widely introduced we can do it in the safest way possible." The NTSB opens annually about 25 to 30 highway investigations. In September 2017, the NTSB released its report, determining that "the probable cause of the Williston, Florida, crash was the truck driver's failure to yield the right of way to the car, combined with the car driver's inattention due to overreliance on vehicle automation, which resulted in the car driver's lack of reaction to the presence of the truck. Contributing to the car driver's overreliance on the vehicle automation was its operational design, which permitted his prolonged disengagement from the driving task and his use of the automation in ways inconsistent with guidance and warnings from the manufacturer."

=== Mountain View, California, US (March 23, 2018) ===
Tesla Model X accident in Mountain View, California

On March 23, 2018, a second US Autopilot fatality occurred in Mountain View, California. The crash occurred just before 9:30 a.m. Pacific Standard Time on southbound US 101 at the carpool lane exit for southbound Highway 85, at a concrete barrier where the left-hand carpool lane offramp separates from 101. After the Model X crashed into the narrow concrete barrier, it was struck by two following vehicles, and then it caught on fire. The driver was Apple engineer Walter Huang, who died.

Both the NHTSA and NTSB began investigations into the March 2018 crash. Another driver of a Model S demonstrated that Autopilot appeared to be confused by the road surface marking in April 2018. The gore ahead of the barrier is marked by diverging solid white lines (a vee-shape) and the Autosteer feature of the Model S appeared to mistakenly use the left-side white line instead of the right-side white line as the lane marking for the far left lane, which would have led the Model S into the same concrete barrier had the driver not taken control. Ars Technica concluded that "as Autopilot gets better, drivers could become increasingly complacent and pay less and less attention to the road."

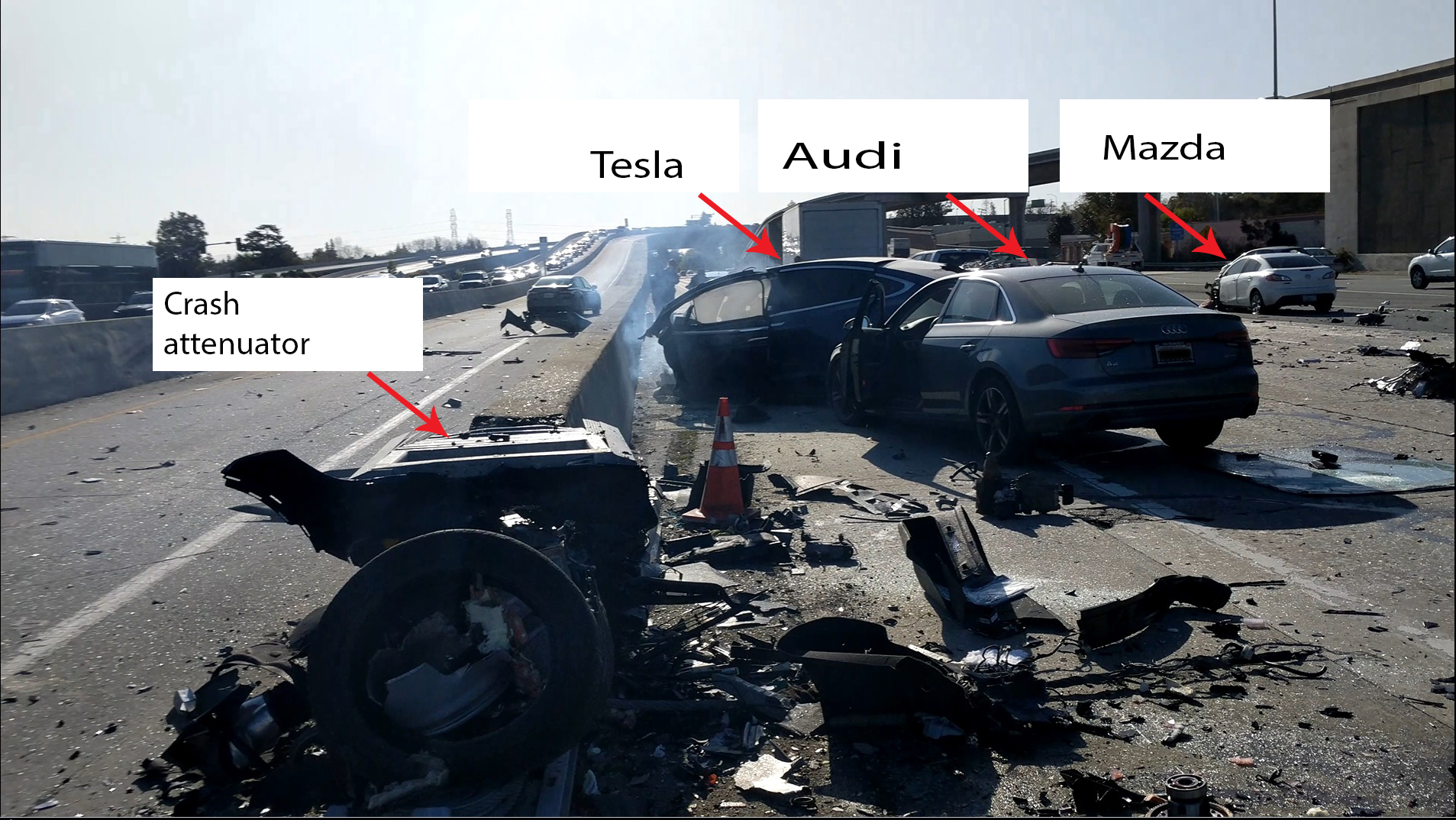
Post-crash scene on US 101 in Mountain View, March 23, 2018

In a corporate blog post, Tesla noted the impact attenuator separating the offramp from US 101 had been previously crushed and not replaced prior to the Model X crash on March 23. The post also stated that Autopilot was engaged at the time of the crash, and the driver's hands had not been detected manipulating the steering wheel for six seconds before the crash. Vehicle data showed the driver had five seconds and a 150 metres (490 ft) "unobstructed view of the concrete divider, ... but the vehicle logs show that no action was taken." The NTSB investigation had been focused on the damaged impact attenuator and the vehicle fire after the collision, but after it was reported the driver had complained about the Autopilot functionality, the NTSB announced it would also investigate "all aspects of this crash including the driver's previous concerns about the autopilot". A NTSB spokesman stated the organization "is unhappy with the release of investigative information by Tesla". Elon Musk dismissed the criticism, tweeting that NTSB was "an advisory body" and that "Tesla releases critical crash data affecting public safety immediately & always will. To do otherwise would be unsafe." In response, NTSB removed Tesla as a party to the investigation on April 11.

NTSB released a preliminary report on June 7, 2018, which provided the recorded telemetry of the Model X and other factual details. Autopilot was engaged continuously for almost nineteen minutes prior to the crash. In the minute before the crash, the driver's hands were detected on the steering wheel for 34 seconds in total, but his hands were not detected for the six seconds immediately preceding the crash. Seven seconds before the crash, the Tesla began to steer to the left and was following a lead vehicle; four seconds before the crash, the Tesla was no longer following a lead vehicle; and during the three seconds before the crash, the Tesla's speed increased to 70.8 mi/h (113.9 km/h). The driver was wearing a seatbelt and was pulled from the vehicle before it was engulfed in flames.

The crash attenuator had been previously damaged on March 12 and had not been replaced at the time of the Tesla crash. The driver involved in the accident on March 12 collided with the crash attenuator at more than 75 mph (121 km/h) and was treated for minor injuries; in comparison, the driver of the Tesla collided with the collapsed attenuator at a slower speed and died from blunt force trauma. After the accident on March 12, the California Highway Patrol failed to report the collapsed attenuator to Caltrans as required. Caltrans was not aware of the damage until March 20, and the attenuator was not replaced until March 26 because a spare was not immediately available. This specific attenuator had required repair more often than any other crash attenuator in the Bay Area, and maintenance records indicated that repair of this attenuator was delayed by up to three months after being damaged. As a result, the NTSB released a Safety Recommendation Report on September 9, 2019, asking Caltrans to develop and implement a plan to guarantee timely repair of traffic safety hardware.

At a NTSB meeting held on February 25, 2020, the board concluded the crash was caused by a combination of the limitations of the Tesla Autopilot system, the driver's over-reliance on Autopilot, and driver distraction likely from playing a video game on his phone. The vehicle's ineffective monitoring of driver engagement was cited as a contributing factor, and the inoperability of the crash attenuator contributed to the driver's injuries. As an advisory agency, NTSB does not have regulatory power; however, NTSB made several recommendations to two regulatory agencies. The NTSB recommendations to the NHTSA included: expanding the scope of the New Car Assessment Program to include testing of forward collision avoidance systems; determining if "the ability to operate [Tesla Autopilot-equipped vehicles] outside the intended operational design domain pose[s] an unreasonable risk to safety"; and developing driver monitoring system performance standards. The NTSB submitted recommendations to the OSHA relating to distracted driving awareness and regulation. In addition, NTSB issued recommendations to manufacturers of portable electronic devices (to develop lock-out mechanisms to prevent driver-distracting functions) and to Apple (banning the nonemergency use of portable electronic devices while driving).

Several NTSB recommendations previously issued to NHTSA, DOT, and Tesla were reclassified to "Open—Unacceptable Response". These included H-17-41 (recommendation to Tesla to incorporate system safeguards that limit the use of automated vehicle control systems to design conditions) and H-17-42 (recommendation to Tesla to more effectively sense the driver's level of engagement). Tesla settled a lawsuit over the incident with the engineer's family in April 2024.

=== Kanagawa, Japan (April 29, 2018) ===
Tesla Model X accident in Kanagawa, Japan

On April 29, 2018, a Tesla Model X operating on Autopilot struck and killed a pedestrian in Kanagawa, Japan, after the driver had fallen asleep. According to a lawsuit filed against Tesla in federal court (N.D. Cal.) in April 2020, the Tesla Model X accelerated from 24 to 38 km/h (15 to 24 mph) after the vehicle in front of it changed lanes; it then crashed into a van, motorcycles, and pedestrians in the far right lane of the expressway, killing a 44-year-old man on the road directing traffic. The original complaint claims the accident occurred due to flaws in Tesla's Autopilot system, such as inadequate monitoring to detect inattentive drivers and an inability to handle traffic situations "that drivers will almost always certainly encounter". In addition, the original complaint claimed this is the first pedestrian fatality to result from the use of Autopilot.

According to vehicle data logs, the driver of the Tesla had engaged Autopilot at 2:11 p.m. Japan Standard Time, shortly after entering the Tōmei Expressway. The driver's hands were detected on the wheel at 2:22 p.m. At some point before 2:49 p.m., the driver began to doze off, and at approximately 2:49 p.m., the vehicle ahead of the Tesla signaled and moved one lane to the left to avoid the vehicles stopped in the far right lane of the expressway. While the Tesla was accelerating to resume its preset speed, it struck the man, killing him. He belonged to a motorcycle riding club which had stopped to render aid to a friend that had been involved in an earlier accident; he specifically had been standing apart from the main group while trying to redirect traffic away from that earlier accident.

The driver of the Tesla was convicted in a Japanese court of criminal negligence and sentenced to three years in prison (suspended for five years). The suit against Tesla in California was dismissed for forum non-conveniens by Judge Susan van Keulen in September 2020 after Tesla said it would accept a case brought in Japan. The plaintiffs appealed the dismissal to the Ninth Circuit Court of Appeals in February 2021, which upheld the lower court's dismissal.

=== Delray Beach, Florida, US (March 1, 2019) ===
Tesla Model 3 accident in Delray Beach, Florida

At approximately 6:17 a.m. Eastern Standard Time on the morning of March 1, 2019, a Tesla Model 3 driving southbound on US 441/SR 7 in Delray Beach, Florida, struck a semi-trailer truck that was making a left-hand turn to northbound SR 7 out of a private driveway at Pero Family Farms; the Tesla underrode the trailer, and the force of the impact sheared off the greenhouse of the Model 3, resulting in the death of the Tesla driver. The driver of the Tesla had engaged Autopilot approximately 10 seconds before the collision and preliminary telemetry showed the vehicle did not detect the driver's hands on the wheel for the eight seconds immediately preceding the collision. The driver of the semi-trailer truck was not cited. Both the NHTSA and NTSB dispatched investigators to the scene.

According to telemetry recorded by the Tesla's restraint control module, the Tesla's cruise control was set to 69 mph (111 km/h) 12.3 seconds prior to the collision and Autopilot was engaged 9.9 seconds prior to the collision; at the moment of impact, the vehicle speed was 68.3 mph (109.9 km/h). After the crash and underride, the Tesla continued southbound on SR 7 for approximately 1,680 ft (510 m) before coming to rest in the median between the northbound and southbound lanes. The car sustained extensive damage to the roof, windshield, and other surfaces above 3 ft 6 in (1.07 m), the clearance under the trailer. The Tesla's driver was restrained by his seatbelt, but none of the airbags deployed and the driver received fatal blunt force trauma to the head.

In May 2019 the NTSB issued a preliminary report that determined that neither the driver of the Tesla or the Autopilot system executed evasive maneuvers. The circumstances of this crash were similar to the fatal underride crash of a Tesla Model S in 2016 near Williston, Florida; in its 2017 report detailing the investigation of that earlier crash, NTSB recommended that Autopilot be used only on limited-access roads (i.e., freeway), which Tesla did not implement.

The NTSB issued its final report in March 2020. The probable cause of the collision was the truck driver's failure to yield the right of way to the Tesla; however, the report also concluded that "[a]t no time before the crash did the car driver brake or initiate an evasive steering action. In addition, no driver-applied steering wheel torque was detected for 7.7 seconds before impact, indicating driver disengagement, likely due to overreliance on the Autopilot system." In addition, the NTSB concluded the operational design of the Tesla Autopilot system "permitted disengagement by the driver" and Tesla failed to "limit the use of the system to the conditions for which it was designed"; the NHTSA also failed to develop a method of verifying that manufacturers had safeguards in place to limit the use of ADAS to design conditions.

=== Key Largo, Florida, US (April 25, 2019) ===
An abstract interpretation of the crash

While driving on Card Sound Road, a 2019 Model S ran through a stop sign and flashing red stop light at the T-intersection with County Road 905, then struck a parked Chevrolet Tahoe which then spun and hit two pedestrians, killing one. A New York Times article later confirmed Autopilot was engaged at the time of the accident. The driver of the Tesla, who was commuting to his home in Key Largo from his office in Boca Raton, dropped his phone while on a call to make flight reservations and bent down to pick it up, failing to stop at the intersection: "I looked down, and I ran the stop sign and hit the guy's car ... When I popped up and I looked and saw a black truck — it happened so fast", later telling the responding police officers that Autopilot was "stupid cruise control".

When the driver of the Tesla called authorities to respond, he spotted only one injured man, who was unconscious and bleeding from the mouth. He told police at the scene that he was driving in "cruise" and was allowed to leave without receiving a citation. Emergency medical personnel saw a woman's shoe under the Tahoe, prompting a search for the second victim, who was found approximately 25 yd (23 m) away from the scene, where she had been thrown from the impact.

The decedent's family filed separate lawsuits against Tesla and the driver; the suit against the driver was settled out of court. The lawsuit against Tesla alleged the company marketed a vehicle with "defective and unsafe characteristics, such as the failure to adequately determine stationary objects in front of the vehicle, which resulted in the death of [the victim]". On August 1, 2025, a federal jury found Tesla to be 33% responsible for the crash. If the verdict is upheld, Tesla would be required to pay up to US$243 million in compensatory and punitive damages. It was the first case involving Tesla's Autopilot ever to go to federal trial.

=== Fremont, California, US (August 24, 2019) ===
In Fremont, California on I-880, while driving north of Stevenson Boulevard, a Ford Explorer pickup was rear-ended by a Tesla Model 3 using Autopilot, causing the pickup's driver to lose control. The pickup overturned and a 15-year-old passenger in the Ford, who was not seat-belted, was jettisoned from the pickup and killed. The deceased's parents sued Tesla and claimed in their filing that "Autopilot contains defects and failed to react to traffic conditions." In response, a lawyer for Tesla noted the police had cited the driver of the Tesla for inattention and operating the car at an unsafe speed. The incident has not been investigated by the NHTSA.

=== Cloverdale, Indiana, US (December 29, 2019) ===
Tesla crash in Cloverdale, Indiana

An eastbound Tesla Model 3 rear-ended a fire truck parked along I-70 near mile marker 38 in Putnam County, Indiana at approximately 8 a.m.; both the driver and passenger in the Tesla, a married couple, were injured and taken to Terre Haute Regional Hospital, where the passenger later died from her injuries. The driver stated he regularly uses Autopilot mode, but could not recall if it was engaged when the Tesla hit the fire truck.

The NHTSA announced it was investigating the crash on January 9 and later confirmed the use of Autopilot at the time of the crash. The driver filed a civil lawsuit against Tesla in November 2021; it was moved to federal court in February 2022.

=== Gardena, California, US (December 29, 2019) ===
Tesla crash in Gardena, California

Shortly before 12:39 a.m. on December 29, 2019, a westbound Tesla Model S exited the freeway section of SR 91, failed to stop for a red light, and crashed into the driver's side of Honda Civic in Gardena, California, killing the driver and passenger in the Civic and injuring the driver and passenger in the Tesla. The freeway section of SR 91 ends just east of the intersection with Vermont Ave and continues as Artesia Blvd. The Tesla was proceeding west on Artesia against the red light when it struck the Civic, which was turning left from Vermont onto Artesia. The occupants of the Tesla were taken to the hospital with non life-threatening injuries.

The NHTSA initiated an investigation of the crash, which was considered unusual for a two-vehicle collision, and later confirmed in January 2022 that Autopilot was engaged during the crash. The driver of the Tesla was charged in October 2021 with vehicular manslaughter in Los Angeles County Superior Court. The families of the two killed also have filed separate civil lawsuits against the driver of the Tesla, for his negligence, and Tesla, for selling defective vehicles.

In May 2022, a preliminary court hearing was held to determine if there was probable cause to proceed with a trial; a Tesla engineer testified the driver of the Tesla had engaged the Autopilot system approximately 20 minutes prior to the crash, setting the speed at 78 mph (126 km/h). The Tesla was traveling at 74 mph (119 km/h) when it collided with the Honda. The judge ordered the driver of the Tesla to stand trial on two counts of vehicular manslaughter. Telemetry data indicated the driver had a hand on the steering wheel, but no brake inputs were detected in the six minutes preceding the crash, despite multiple signs at the end of the freeway warning drivers to slow down. The driver of the Tesla pleaded not guilty in June. The trial, scheduled for November 15, was postponed to late February 2023. The driver changed his plea to no contest and was sentenced to two years of probation that June.

=== Arendal, Norway (May 29, 2020) ===
Tesla accident in Arendal, Norway

After being notified that some straps on his trailer had come loose, on May 29, 2020, at approximately 11:00 a.m., a solo truck driver parked a tractor-trailer on the hard shoulder of northbound E18, 181 m (594 ft) northeast of the Torsbuås tunnel exit, just outside Arendal. Because of the restricted shoulder width, part of the truck was protruding into the right lane of E18. While fixing the loose strap that was securing the load, he was struck and killed by a northbound Tesla Model S. The Tesla driver had engaged Autopilot approximately 4 km (2.5 mi) south of the accident site; as he exited the tunnel and approached the parked truck, he observed there were no warning lights on the truck or a warning triangle on the ground and he assumed the truck was abandoned. He then "heard a loud bang, and the car's windscreen cracked"; after pulling over to the shoulder, he walked back towards the parked truck and saw the truck driver's body.

The Tesla's driver was charged with negligent homicide. Early in the trial, an expert witness testified that the car's computer indicated Autopilot was engaged at the time of the incident. A forensic scientist said the victim was less visible because he was in the shadow of the trailer. The driver said he had both hands on the wheel, and that he was vigilant. He was sentenced to three months' imprisonment in December 2020.

The Accident Investigation Board Norway investigated the crash and published its report in June 2022. According to the investigation report, the truck driver had failed to report his stop to fix the strap to the Traffic Control Centre, and no passing motorists reported the parked truck; consequently, the driver of the Tesla was not notified there was a truck parked outside the tunnel. The Tesla's driver believed there was sufficient room to pass the parked truck while remaining in the right lane. Because the truck driver was next to the trailer in the shadow cast by the truck, the Tesla driver's view of the truck driver may have been compromised.

In addition, the company responsible for planning and constructing the road, Nye Veier AS, was faulted by the investigators. During the planning phase, Nye Veier proposed a narrower shoulder of 2.0 m (6 ft 7 in) rather than 3.0 m (9.8 ft) as originally designed; this variance was approved by the Norwegian Public Roads Administration contingent on Nye Veier implementing mitigations. Nye Veier did not implement the proposed mitigations.

=== Marietta, Georgia, US (September 17, 2020) ===
On September 17, 2020, at approximately 5:24 a.m. EDT, the driver of a 2020 Tesla Model 3 crashed into an occupied CobbLinc bus shelter, demolishing it and killing the man waiting inside. The Tesla was driving north on South Cobb Drive near the intersection with Leader Road. Because the car's event data recorder showed it had reached a speed of 77 mph (124 km/h) prior to the crash and that area has a posted speed limit of 45 mph (72 km/h), police charged the driver with first-degree vehicular homicide and reckless driving.

At the time of the crash, it was not determined if Autopilot was engaged. In September 2022, data provided by Tesla to the NHTSA demonstrated that Autopilot was active at the time of the crash.

=== Fontana, California, US (May 5, 2021) ===
At 2:35 a.m. PDT on May 5, 2021, a Tesla Model 3 crashed into an overturned tractor-trailer on the westbound Foothill Freeway (I-210) in Fontana, California. The driver of the Tesla was killed, and a man who had stopped to assist the driver of the truck was struck and injured by the Tesla. California Highway Patrol (CHP) officials announced on May 13 that Autopilot "was engaged" prior to the crash, but added a day later that "a final determination [has not been] made as to what driving mode the Tesla was in or if it was a contributing factor to the crash". The CHP and NHTSA are investigating the crash. Telemetry data indicate that an automated driving system was in use at the time of the crash.

=== Queens, New York, US (July 26, 2021) ===
On July 26, 2021, just after midnight, a man was hit and killed by a driver in a Tesla Model Y SUV. The victim had parked his vehicle on the left shoulder of the westbound Long Island Expressway (I-495), just east of the College Point Boulevard exit in Flushing, Queens, New York, to change a flat tire. The NHTSA later determined Autopilot was active during the collision and sent a team to further investigate.

=== Evergreen, Colorado, US (May 16, 2022) ===
In the evening of May 16, 2022, the driver of a Tesla Model 3 left Upper Bear Creek Road in Evergreen, Colorado and collided with a tree. After the car caught on fire, a passenger was able to exit, but the driver was unable to leave the car and died at the scene. A subsequent Colorado State Patrol (CSP) investigation determined the driver would have survived the crash, but died from smoke inhalation and thermal injuries. Law enforcement suspect that the Tesla was operating in Autopilot, but due to the remote location, no data was uploaded, and the fire destroyed the onboard data, so the pre-crash telemetry could not be used to verify. The CSP investigation could not determine why the driver did not exit the vehicle. An autopsy of the driver determined their blood alcohol content was 0.264%, more than three times the legal limit.

The crash occurred while the two were returning from an outing to play golf. The surviving passenger recalled the driver had engaged FSD on the trip to the golf course, but was forced to make many manual steering corrections on the winding road. After the crash, the passenger told the 9-1-1 operator the "auto-drive feature on the Tesla" was being used and the vehicle "just ran straight off the road". The lead CSP investigator determined from the tire markings left at the scene the driver never used the brakes and the motors continued to power the wheels after impact, concluding that since "the vehicle drove off the road with no evidence of a sudden maneuver, that fits with the [driver-assistance] feature being engaged". In an article published by The Washington Post in 2024, based on the driver's history and interviews with the surviving passenger and the driver's spouse, the newspaper concluded this was likely the first fatality with FSD engaged. The Post article also used features enabled in the vehicle purchase order, vehicle records, and "a recent message from the company offering [the driver's] account the ability to 'Transfer Your Full Self-Driving Capability to a New Tesla'" to determine the car was equipped with FSD.

=== Mission Viejo, California, US (May 17, 2022) ===
At 10:51 p.m. PDT on May 17, 2022, a pedestrian walking on southbound I-5 near Crown Valley Parkway in Mission Viejo, California was struck and killed by a driver operating a Tesla Model 3. After the pedestrian was hit, the driver of the Tesla parked the car and exited it to stand on the right shoulder of the freeway; an impaired driver then crashed their car into the Tesla, and a third driver crashed into the two-car wreck, which was in a construction zone. Field report data confirmed the Tesla was operating in Autopilot when the pedestrian was killed.

=== Gainesville, Florida, US (July 6, 2022) ===
At approximately 2:00 p.m. EDT on July 6, 2022, the driver of a Tesla Model S traveling southbound on I-75 exited at a rest area just south of Gainesville, Florida, near Paynes Prairie Preserve State Park, and smashed into the rear of a parked Walmart tractor-trailer. Both the driver and passenger of the Tesla, a married couple from Lompoc, California, were killed. A spokesperson for the Florida Highway Patrol noted "[The vehicle] came off the exit ramp to the rest area, continued south for a short period, and turned into an easterly direction and that's at what time we had the collision where the Tesla struck the rear of the tractor-trailer." The NHTSA confirmed it had sent an investigation team to the site. Data reported by Tesla under NHTSA SGO-2021-01 indicate that Autopilot may have been engaged during the crash.

However, in February 2023, a Florida Highway Patrol investigation concluded the crash was due to driver error: while exiting the freeway to the rest area, the driver pressed the accelerator pedal instead of the brake, and the Tesla hit a curb at 60 mph (97 km/h), then collided with the parked truck. The family sued Tesla in March 2023, alleging the "defective and unreasonably dangerous" Tesla had "malfunctioned during reasonable and foreseeable use", adding the vehicle "was equipped with several crash avoidance and crash mitigation features and technologies".

=== Riverside, California, US (July 7, 2022) ===
It was initially (and incorrectly) reported that at 4:47 a.m. PDT on July 7, 2022, a driver in a Tesla Model Y approached from behind, and then struck a motorcyclist on a Yamaha V-Star. Both vehicles were traveling eastbound in the high-occupancy vehicle lane of SR 91, west of Magnolia Avenue in Riverside, California. The motorcyclist was ejected from his vehicle and died at the scene, while the driver of the Tesla was uninjured after the Model Y went off the road. The driver of the Tesla was not arrested.

Subsequent CHP investigation showed the motorcyclist struck the dividing wall and fell off his motorcycle; the Tesla Model Y following behind struck the motorcycle (which was already lying on its side) but not the motorcyclist. Telemetry data from Tesla later confirmed the Model Y driver was using Autopilot. Data reported by Tesla under NHTSA SGO-2021-01 also confirmed that Autopilot was engaged during the crash.

=== Draper, Utah, US (July 24, 2022) ===
A motorcycle rider was struck from behind by a driver using Autopilot in a Tesla Model 3 on southbound Interstate 15 near 15000 S in Draper, Utah, at 1:09 a.m. MDT on July 24, 2022. The collision threw the motorcycle rider from his Harley-Davidson to the ground, killing him. The driver told police he did not see the motorcyclist and he was using Autopilot at the time of the crash. Telemetric data submitted to NHTSA later confirmed his statements.

Michael Brooks, the acting executive director of the Center for Auto Safety commented "It's pretty clear to me, and it should be to a lot of Tesla owners by now, this stuff isn't working properly and it's not going to live up to the expectations, and it is putting innocent people in danger on the roads ... Drivers are being lured into thinking this protects them and others on the roads, and it's just not working."

=== Boca Raton, Florida, US (August 26, 2022) ===
On August 26, 2022, at 2:11 a.m. EDT, a motorcycle rider on a Kawasaki Vulcan was struck from behind by a driver in a Tesla Model 3 while both vehicles were traveling westbound on SW 18th Street approaching Boca Rio Road in Sandalfoot Cove, a census-designated place in unincorporated Palm Beach County, just outside the city of Boca Raton, Florida. The motorcycle rider was thrown from her motorcycle into the windshield of the Tesla; the rider was transported to a hospital, where she later died from the injuries she sustained in the collision. The driver of the Tesla was suspected of driving under the influence of alcohol and/or prescription drugs.

The Palm Beach County Sheriff's Office later confirmed the driver of the Tesla was using Autopilot. Data reported by Tesla under NHTSA SGO-2021-01 also confirm that Autopilot was engaged during the crash.

There have been multiple fatal collisions in the United States during 2022 in which a Tesla operating with Autopilot struck a motorcycle from the rear; in each instance, the motorcyclist was killed. One theory is that because Tesla has shifted to exclusively visual sensors, the Autopilot logic to set the gap between the Tesla and a leading vehicle assumes the distance to a vehicle in front is inversely proportional to the spacing between that leading vehicle's taillights. Because motorcycle taillights are close-set, Tesla Autopilot may assume incorrectly the motorcycle is a distant car or truck.

=== Walnut Creek, California, US (February 18, 2023) ===
The driver of a 2014 Tesla Model S was killed after the vehicle he was driving crashed into a Contra Costa County fire truck parked across several lanes of northbound I-680 south of the Treat Boulevard offramp in Walnut Creek, California, at 4 a.m. on February 18, 2023. The truck was parked with its lights on to protect the scene of an earlier accident that did not result in any injuries. The Tesla had to be cut open to extricate the passenger, who was taken to the hospital to treat their injuries; four firefighters in the fire truck also were injured and taken to the hospital.

Initially, the California Highway Patrol stated it was not clear if the driver was intoxicated or operating the car with assistance features, but NHTSA confirmed in March they suspected that an "automated driving system" was being used when the Tesla crashed into the fire truck, and had sent a special crash investigation team as part of a larger probe (EA 22-002) involving multiple incidents in which Teslas operating with Autopilot have crashed into stationary emergency response vehicles. Tesla confirmed in April the car was operating under Autopilot at the time of the crash. Telemetry data indicate that an automated driving system was in use at the time of the crash.

=== Corona, California, US (March 28, 2023) ===
On March 28, 2023, at approximately 10:15 p.m., the driver of a Tesla Model Y died after the Tesla was struck by the driver of Ford F-150 pickup truck, who had entered the intersection of Foothill Parkway and Rimpau Avenue in Corona, California against a red light. The Tesla was proceeding through the intersection on a green light. Telemetry data indicate that an automated driving system was in use at the time of the crash.

=== Central Point, Oregon, US (June 5, 2023) ===
The Oregon State Police responded to a single-vehicle accident reported at 3:30 a.m. (PDT) on June 5, 2023, in Jackson County, Oregon; the Tesla Model S was driving northbound on I-5 near milepost 33 when the car departed from the roadway, striking a fence and then a tree before catching on fire. The driver was pronounced dead at the scene. Telemetry data indicate that an automated driving system was in use at the time of the crash.

=== Brooklyn, New York, US (June 7, 2023) ===
On June 7, 2023, at approximately 9 p.m., the driver of a Tesla Model S traveling along Ocean Parkway in Midwood, Brooklyn left the roadway, striking and killing a pedestrian waiting on the sidewalk to cross the street at the intersection with Avenue M. The driver then struck a light pole and collided with a park bench on the median, injuring a man who had been seated on it. The driver was arrested for leaving the scene of the crash. Telemetry data indicate that an automated driving system was in use at the time of the crash.

=== Turlock, California, US (June 20, 2023) ===
At approximately 3:15 a.m. on June 20, 2023, a driver operating a white sedan the wrong way (south in the northbound lanes) on SR 99 near Lander Avenue in Turlock, California, collided with a northbound Tesla Model Y traveling at approximately 70 mph (110 km/h). The driver of the wrong-way vehicle was killed, and the driver and passenger in the Tesla were injured. Alcohol appears to have been a factor. Telemetry data indicate that an automated driving system was in use at the time of the crash.

=== South Lake Tahoe, California, US (July 5, 2023) ===
On July 5, 2023, at approximately 5:30 p.m. (PDT), the driver of a Subaru Impreza traveling north on Pioneer Trail at 55 mph (89 km/h) collided head-on with a Tesla Model 3 traveling south at 45 mph (72 km/h). The collision happened just south of the intersection with Fair Meadow Trail. The driver of the Subaru was taken to Barton Memorial Hospital, where he died from his injuries. The five occupants of the Tesla were taken to UC Davis Medical Center, and one died, a three-month-old infant. NHTSA dispatched an investigation team to the scene of the crash. Telemetry data indicate that an automated driving system was in use at the time of the crash.

=== Opal, Virginia, US (July 19, 2023) ===
While traveling north on the concurrent US 15/17/29 (James Madison Highway) at approximately 6:31 p.m. (EDT) on July 19, 2023, the driver of a Tesla Model Y collided with and continued under the side of the trailer of a combination truck pulling out of the Quarles Truck Stop fuel station near Opal, Virginia, south of Warrenton. The Tesla driver was killed and the truck driver was cited for reckless driving. Two days later, the Fauquier County Sheriff's Office executed a search warrant for data from the Tesla, based on witness reports that said the Tesla driver did not attempt to brake before the collision. The reckless driving charge against the truck driver was dropped in November, after the sheriff's office found the Tesla was travelling at 70 mph (110 km/h) prior to impact, exceeding the 45 mph (72 km/h) speed limit in that area.

That August, NHTSA sent a team to investigate the collision; the Tesla is suspected of being operated under Autopilot. Telemetry data indicate that an automated driving system was in use at the time of the crash. The sheriff's office concluded that Autopilot was in use, based on data obtained from the vehicle's event data recorder; the system had warned the driver to take control because it had detected an obstacle ahead, and the driver applied the brakes approximately one second before impact, but it was not clear if that was sufficient to disengage Autopilot. Had the vehicle been traveling at the speed limit, the sheriff's office determined the driver would have had adequate time to avoid the collision.

=== Flagstaff, Arizona, US (November 27, 2023) ===
The driver of a Tesla Model Y was travelling down the Interstate 17 from Flagstaff to Phoenix, Arizona. As the car approached the scene of a recent crash, it failed to stop and crashed head-on into a pedestrian.

The driver of the Tesla estimated they were driving at about 65 mph (105 km/h) prior to the crash. As the car entered a curve which revealed the glare of the setting sun, the Tesla kept to the same speed despite passing several other vehicles slowing down or at a standstill with hazard warning lights on as well as a pedestrian attempting to alert the driver. The car finally swerved to avoid a stopped vehicle and ran into a pedestrian, a 71-year-old woman who had just put on a safety vest and was leaving her vehicle. She was pronounced dead at the scene.

While the crash report initially did not mention that the Tesla Autopilot was engaged, Tesla reported the crash to NHTSA seven months after the incident, as required whenever any advanced driver assistance systems are involved.

=== Snohomish County, Washington, US (April 19, 2024) ===
At approximately 3:54 p.m. on April 19, 2024, a motorcyclist was killed after a driver in a 2022 Tesla Model S crashed into the rear of the motorcycle. Both vehicles were traveling on eastbound Washington State Route 522 just west of its intersection with Fales Road, in unincorporated Snohomish County, Washington, close to Maltby. The motorcyclist had slowed down due to traffic conditions, but the Tesla driver did not. The Tesla driver reported he heard a bang as the car collided with the motorcycle and lurched forward; the motorcyclist was ejected and was pinned underneath the Tesla. A few days later, the Tesla driver was arrested for vehicular homicide due to distracted driving based on his admission that he "had the Tesla on Autopilot while looking at his phone", and was released after posting bond. The motorcyclist was wearing a GoPro, which police collected for evidence.

During the investigation, the Washington State Patrol determined the Tesla was operating in FSD, based on telemetry data from the car. It is the second fatal accident involving FSD. The NHTSA is gathering information about this crash from local law enforcement.

== Non-fatal crashes ==
=== Culver City, California, US (January 22, 2018) ===
On January 22, 2018, a 2014 Tesla Model S crashed into a fire truck parked on the side of the I-405 freeway in Culver City, California, while traveling at a speed exceeding 50 mph (80 km/h) and the driver survived with no injuries. The driver told the Culver City Fire Department that he was using Autopilot. The fire truck and a California Highway Patrol vehicle were parked diagonally across the left emergency lane and high-occupancy vehicle lane of the southbound I-405, blocking off the scene of an earlier accident, with emergency lights flashing.

According to a post-accident interview, the driver stated he was drinking coffee, eating a bagel, and maintaining contact with the steering wheel while resting his hand on his knee. During the 30-mile (48 km) trip, which lasted 66 minutes, the Autopilot system was engaged for slightly more than 29 minutes; of the 29 minutes, hands were detected on the steering wheel for only 78 seconds in total. Hands were detected applying torque to the steering wheel for only 51 seconds over the nearly 14 minutes immediately preceding the crash. The Tesla had been following a lead vehicle in the high-occupancy vehicle lane at approximately 21 mph (34 km/h); when the lead vehicle moved to the right to avoid the fire truck, approximately three or four seconds prior to impact, the Tesla's traffic-aware cruise control system began to accelerate the Tesla to its preset speed of 80 mph (130 km/h). When the impact occurred, the Tesla had accelerated to 31 mph (50 km/h). The Autopilot system issued a forward collision warning half a second before the impact, but did not engage the automatic emergency braking (AEB) system, and the driver did not manually intervene by braking or steering. Because Autopilot requires agreement between the radar and visual cameras to initiate AEB, the system was challenged due to the specific scenario (where a lead vehicle detours around a stationary object) and the limited time available after the forward collision warning.

Several news outlets started reporting that Autopilot may not detect stationary vehicles at highway speeds and it cannot detect some objects. Raj Rajkumar, who studies autonomous driving systems at Carnegie Mellon University, believes the radars used for Autopilot are designed to detect moving objects, but are "not very good in detecting stationary objects". Both NTSB and NHTSA dispatched teams to investigate the crash. Hod Lipson, director of Columbia University's Creative Machines Lab, faulted the diffusion of responsibility concept: "If you give the same responsibility to two people, they each will feel safe to drop the ball. Nobody has to be 100%, and that's a dangerous thing."

In August 2019, the NTSB released its accident brief for the accident. HAB-19-07 concluded the driver of the Tesla was at fault due to "inattention and overreliance on the vehicle's advanced driver assistance system", but added the design of the Tesla Autopilot system "permitted the driver to disengage from the driving task". After the earlier crash in Williston, the NTSB issued a safety recommendation to "[d]evelop applications to more effectively sense the driver's level of engagement and alert the driver when engagement is lacking while automated vehicle control systems are in use." Among the manufacturers that the recommendation was issued to, only Tesla has failed to issue a response.

=== South Jordan, Utah, US (May 11, 2018) ===
In the evening of May 11, 2018, a 2016 Tesla Model S with Autopilot engaged crashed into the rear of a fire truck that was stopped in the southbound lane at a red light in South Jordan, Utah, at the intersection of SR-154 and SR-151. The Tesla was moving at an estimated 60 mi/h (97 km/h) and did not appear to brake or attempt to avoid the impact, according to witnesses. The driver of the Tesla, who survived the impact with a broken foot, admitted she was looking at her phone before the crash. The NHTSA dispatched investigators to South Jordan. According to telemetry data recovered after the crash, the driver repeatedly did not touch the wheel, including during the 80 seconds immediately preceding the crash, and only touched the brake pedal "fractions of a second" before the crash. The driver was cited by police for "failure to keep proper lookout". The Tesla had slowed to 55 mi/h (89 km/h) to match a vehicle ahead of it, and after that vehicle changed lanes, accelerated to 60 mi/h (97 km/h) in the 3.5 seconds preceding the crash.

Tesla CEO Elon Musk criticized news coverage of the South Jordan crash, tweeting that "a Tesla crash resulting in a broken ankle is front page news and the ~40,000 people who died in US auto accidents alone in [the] past year get almost no coverage", additionally pointing out that "[a]n impact at that speed usually results in severe injury or death", but later conceding that Autopilot "certainly needs to be better & we work to improve it every day". In September 2018, the driver of the Tesla sued the manufacturer, alleging the safety features designed to "ensure the vehicle would stop on its own in the event of an obstacle being present in the path ... failed to engage as advertised." According to the driver, the Tesla failed to provide an audible or visual warning before the crash.

=== Moscow, Russia (August 10, 2019) ===
On the night of August 10, 2019, a Tesla Model 3 driving in the left-hand lane on the Moscow Ring Road in Moscow, Russia, crashed into a parked tow truck with a corner protruding into the lane and subsequently burst into flames. According to the driver, the vehicle was traveling at the speed limit of 100 km/h (62 mph) with Autopilot activated; he also claimed his hands were on the wheel, but was not paying attention at the time of the crash. All occupants were able to exit the vehicle before it caught on fire; they were transported to the hospital. Injuries included a broken leg (driver) and bruises (his children).

The force of the collision was enough to push the tow truck forward into the central dividing wall, as recorded by a surveillance camera. Passersby also captured several videos of the fire and explosions after the accident, these videos also show the tow truck that the Tesla crashed into had been moved, suggesting the explosions of the Model 3 happened later.

=== Chiayi, Taiwan (June 1, 2020) ===
Traffic cameras captured the moment when a Tesla Model 3 slammed into an overturned cargo truck in Taiwan on June 1, 2020. The crash occurred at 6:40 a.m. National Standard Time on the southbound National Freeway 1 in Chiayi, Taiwan, at approximately the south 268.4 km marker. The truck had been involved in a traffic accident at 6:35 a.m. and overturned with its roof facing oncoming traffic; the driver of the truck got out to warn other cars away.

The driver of the Tesla was uninjured and told emergency responders that the car was in Autopilot mode, traveling at 110 km/h (68 mph). The driver told authorities that he saw the truck and thought the Tesla would brake automatically upon encountering an obstacle; when he realized it would not, he manually applied the brakes, although it was too late to avoid the crash, which is apparently indicated on the video by a puff of white smoke coming from the tires.

=== Arlington Heights, Washington, US (May 15, 2021) ===
A Tesla Model S crashed into a stopped Snohomish County, Washington, sheriff's patrol car at 6:40 p.m. PDT on May 15, 2021, shortly after the deputy parked it while responding to an earlier crash which had broken a utility pole near the intersection of SR 530 and 103rd Ave NE in Arlington Heights, Washington. The patrol car was parked to partially block the roadway and protect the collision scene, and the patrol car's overhead emergency lights were activated. Neither the deputy nor the driver of the Tesla were injured. The driver of the Tesla assumed his car would slow and move over on its own because it was in "Auto-Pilot mode".

=== Brea, California, US (November 3, 2021) ===
The driver of a Tesla Model Y reported a crash to the NHTSA that occurred on November 3, 2021, while operating in FSD Beta. The incident was described as a "severe" crash after "the car by itself took control and forced itself into the incorrect lane" during a left turn. It is likely this is the first complaint filed with NHTSA that alleges FSD caused a crash; NHTSA requested further information from Tesla, but other details of the crash, such as the driver's identity and location of the crash, were not released.

=== Armadale, Victoria, Australia (March 22, 2022) ===
On March 22, 2022, at approximately 6:30 a.m., the driver of a Tesla Model 3 struck a woman boarding a city-bound tram on Wattletree Road in Armadale, an inner suburb of Melbourne in the Australian state of Victoria. After being struck, the victim was dragged for approximately 15–20 m (49–66 ft). She was taken to the hospital with life-threatening injuries. The driver of the Tesla fled the scene initially, then turned herself in to police two hours later. According to the official report, the driver stated her Tesla 3 was on Autopilot when she struck the pedestrian.

The driver pleaded not guilty to four charges in April 2023, including dangerous driving causing serious injury, and was ordered to stand trial after the magistrate heard testimony from five witnesses. The tram operator testified he saw a woman rise from a seat at the tram stop and start walking toward the tram before she was struck: "I hear a thud, a whoosh, a car went passed [sic]". The chief safety officer of Yarra Trams testified that "once the tram has stopped... there are big flashing lights (at the rear of the vehicle), we call them school lights", adding the tram could not have opened its doors before the crash.

The driver eventually filed a guilty plea, admitting she was in full control the whole time and Autopilot wasn’t engaged.

=== Maumee, Ohio, US (November 18, 2022) ===
On November 18, 2022, at 8:21 a.m., a Tesla Model 3 collided with the rear end of a stationary Ohio State Highway Patrol cruiser in the left lane of eastbound U.S. 24 near milepost 64, where it passes over Waterville–Monclova Road near Maumee, Ohio, a suburb of Toledo. The cruiser was parked with its emergency lights flashing to protect the vehicle involved in an earlier single-car accident at the scene. The OSHP officer and the driver from the earlier accident were sitting in the cruiser; both sustained minor injuries from the impact.

In December, the NHTSA confirmed they were investigating the crash, which may have involved Autopilot. Telemetry data indicate that Autopilot was active.

=== San Francisco–Oakland Bay Bridge, California, US (November 24, 2022) ===
The driver of a 2021 Tesla Model S told the California Highway Patrol that while driving eastbound on "Full Self-Driving" mode in the Yerba Buena Tunnel portion of the San Francisco–Oakland Bay Bridge near Treasure Island, at approximately noon on November 24, 2022, the vehicle cut across several lanes of traffic to the far left lane and abruptly slowed from 55 to 20 mph (89 to 32 km/h), causing a chain-reaction collision involving eight vehicles. Nine were treated for injuries, and two lanes of traffic were closed for 90 minutes. Surveillance footage acquired by The Intercept corroborated the vehicle's sudden movements.

NHTSA confirmed they would send a team to investigate the crash. Telemetry data indicate that an automated driving system was in use at the time of the crash.

=== Halifax County, North Carolina, US (March 15, 2023) ===
On Wednesday, March 15, 2023, in Halifax County, North Carolina, a 17-year-old high school student attending the Haliwa-Saponi Tribal School was struck by a driver in a 2022 Tesla Model Y. The student had just exited a school bus and was crossing the road to his house when he was struck by the Tesla. The bus was stopped with flashing lights and its stop arm deployed; the North Carolina State Highway Patrol initially attributed the cause of the injury to "distracted driving". The student's father rendered first aid after witnessing the collision, which left the teenager with a broken neck and internal bleeding. He was flown to WakeMed and placed on a ventilator.

It is unclear whether the car was in Autopilot during the accident, but it is being investigated by the State Highway Patrol. NHTSA have dispatched a team to investigate. Telemetry data indicate that an automated driving system was in use at the time of the crash.

=== Fullerton, California, US (June 13, 2024) ===
On June 13, 2024, a driver in a Tesla struck a parked police vehicle at the intersection of West Orangethorpe and Courtney avenues in Fullerton, California; the police vehicle was parked to protect the scene of an earlier fatal collision, blocking traffic, with flares deployed and emergency lights operating. The driver of the Tesla admitted that he had engaged the "self-drive" system and was using his cell phone.
