= HAWK beacon =

Traffic control device

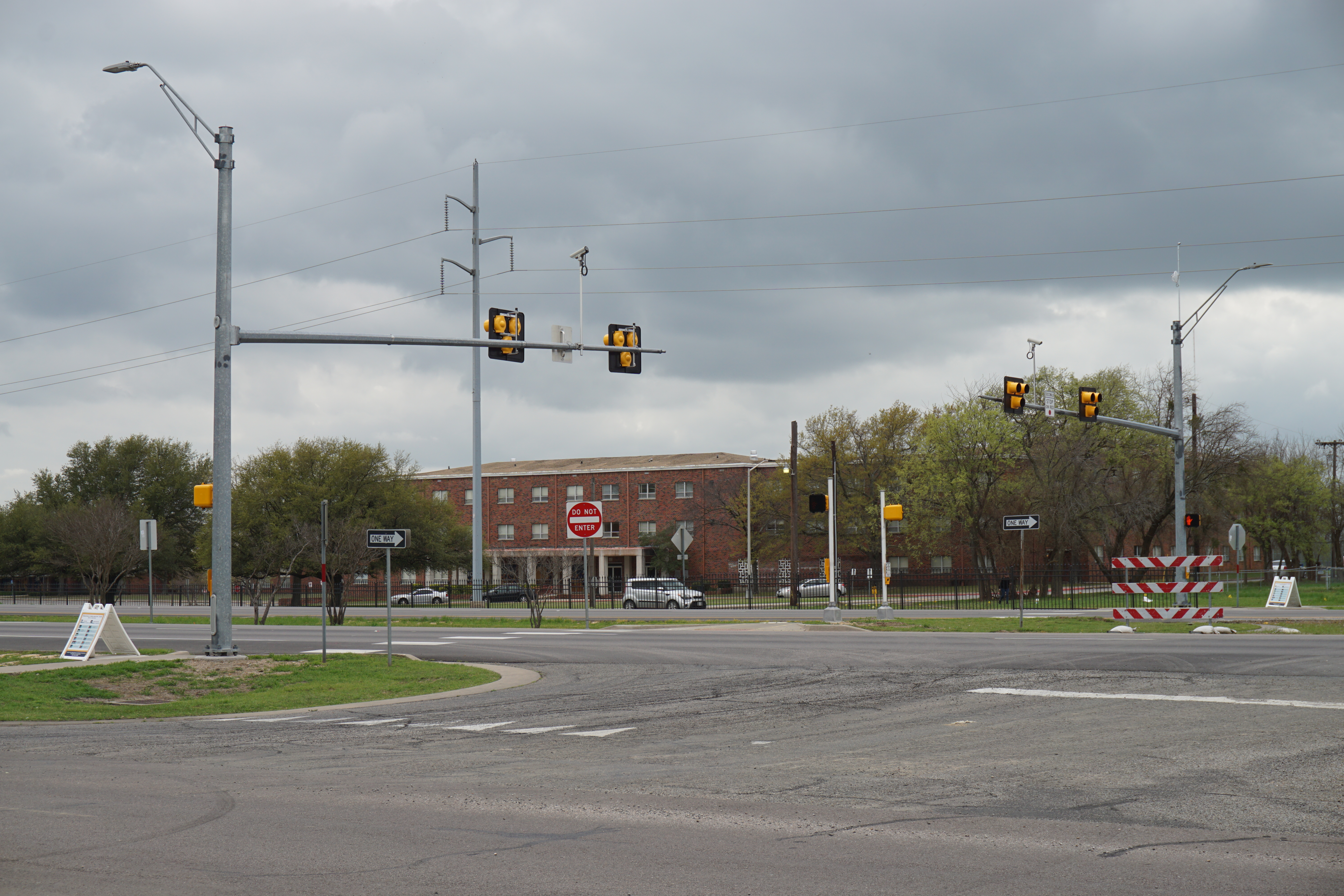
A HAWK beacon on the campus of East Texas A&M University

A HAWK beacon (high-intensity activated crosswalk beacon) or pedestrian hybrid beacon is a traffic control device used to stop vehicular traffic and allow pedestrians to cross safely. The purpose of a HAWK beacon is to allow protected pedestrian crossings, stopping vehicular traffic only as needed. The HAWK beacon is a type of traffic control alternative to traffic control signals and/or where an intersection does not meet traffic signal warrants.

A HAWK beacon is used only for marked crosswalks. A similar hybrid beacon, called "emergency-vehicle hybrid beacons" are allowed at driveways of emergency service buildings such as fire stations.

== History ==
The first beacon was developed and installed in 2000 in Tucson, Arizona by R. B. Nassi, a then-transportation administrator for the city. He was inspired after a trip to Bristol in South West England where he saw a pelican crossing, he developed a prototype and his wife suggested the abbreviation HAWK. Prior to its full implementation, the HAWK beacon was categorized as an experimental device. At the time, United States transportation agencies that wanted to use the HAWK signal were required to obtain interim approval from the Federal Highway Administration (FHWA). The interim approval also required the agencies to collect and submit data on the effectiveness of the device. The device was fully implemented when it was included in the 2009 edition of the Manual on Uniform Traffic Control Devices (MUTCD) as a pedestrian hybrid beacon.

== Design ==
Diagram of the signal head of a HAWK beacon

The vehicular signal head consists of three sections: two horizontally arranged circular red sections, over a single circular yellow section centered between the red lights. The MUTCD requires at least two HAWK signal faces facing each vehicular approach to the crossing. Normal pedestrian signal heads control pedestrian traffic.

The MUTCD has guidelines for when pedestrian hybrid beacons should be installed. The guidelines take into account pedestrian and vehicle traffic volumes, vehicle speeds, roadway width, and engineering judgment.

=== Operation ===
Animation demonstrating the operation of a HAWK beacon

Unlike standard traffic signals, the vehicular signal heads of an HAWK beacon are unlit until activated by a pedestrian who wishes to cross the roadway. The pedestrian signal heads operate normally, displaying an upraised hand (don't walk) aspect during the time that vehicles have the right of way. When a pedestrian activates the beacon by pushing the pedestrian call button, the HAWK beacon sequence is started. First with flashing yellow, then steady yellow, and finally steady red over a period of several seconds. Pedestrian signal heads at either end of the crosswalk display the upraised hand (don't walk) signal until the HAWK beacon displays the steady red signal, at which time, the pedestrian heads change to the walking-person (walk) aspect.

As the pedestrian phase starts to end, the walking-person (walk) aspect changes to a flashing upraised hand (don't walk) with a countdown indicator. Pedestrians in the roadway should finish crossing the roadway, and anyone who wishes to cross but has not entered the roadway should reactivate the signal and wait. At this point, the vehicular signal heads change to display an alternating flashing red aspect. Vehicles must yield to any pedestrians still in the crosswalk. If the crosswalk is clear, they may proceed after coming to a full stop.

Once the pedestrian crossing phase ends, the countdown indicator reaches "0," and the pedestrian signal changes back to the non-flashing upraised hand (don't walk). Then, the vehicle signal head returns to the dark state, and vehicle traffic has the right of way until the signal is reactivated.

=== Sequence of signal ===
Signal operation sequence and driver responsibility
Pedestrian Hybrid Beacon aspect	Pedestrian Signal Aspect	Driver response	Pedestrian response
		Drivers may proceed normally, without stopping at the crosswalk.	Pedestrians press the pedestrian call button.
		Drivers should slow down and prepare to stop soon.	Pedestrians wait.
		Drivers should stop, if able to do so safely. The signal is changing to red in a moment.	Pedestrians continue to wait.
		Drivers must stop before the crosswalk.	Pedestrians may start crossing the street.
		Drivers may proceed after coming to a full stop, and checking that the crosswalk is clear. (Similar to a stop sign.)	Pedestrians already crossing the street should finish. Pedestrians that have not started crossing the street, should not start.
		Drivers may proceed without stopping, if the crosswalk is clear.	Pedestrians press the pedestrian call button.
End of sequence.

== Effectiveness ==
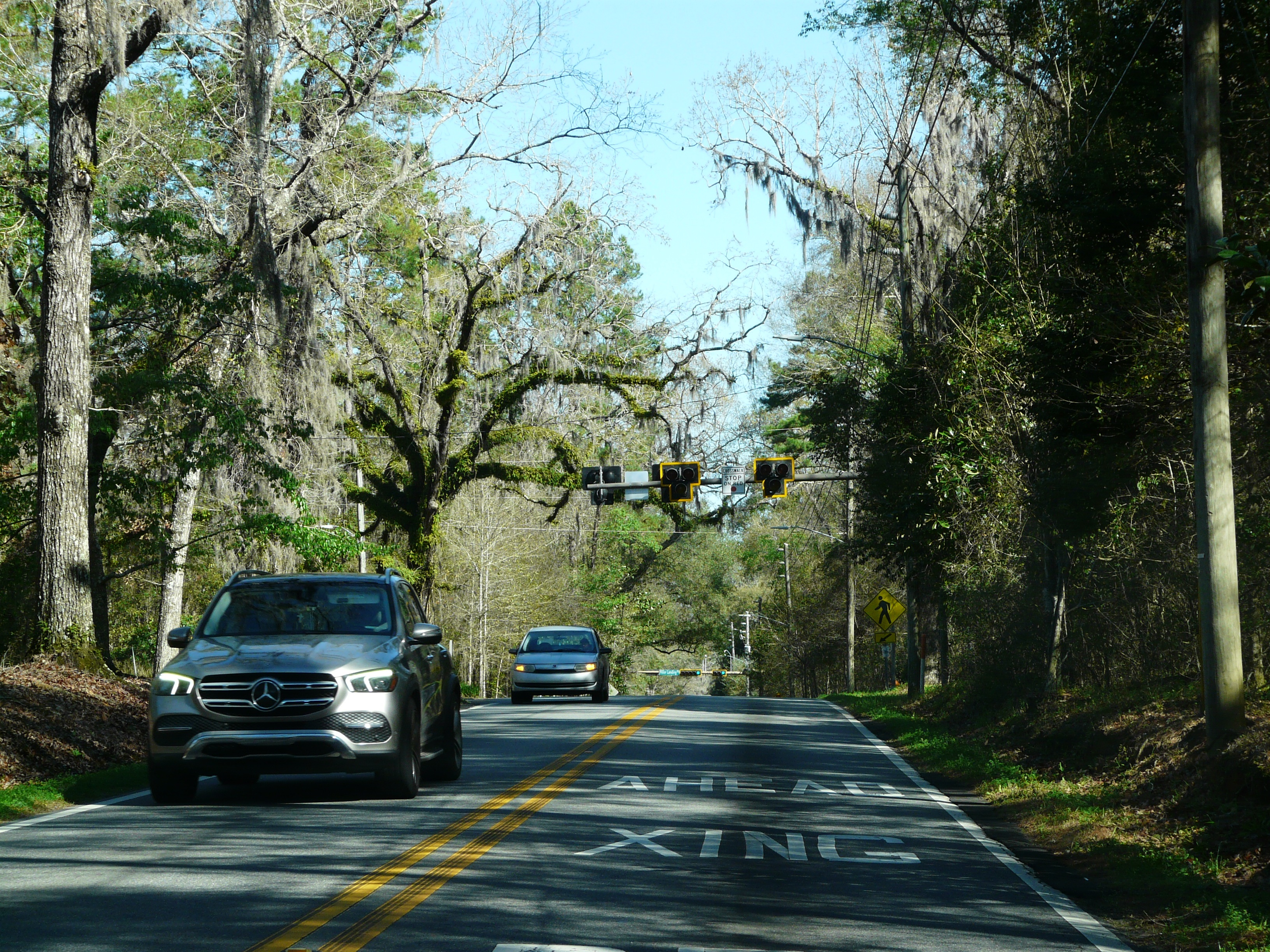
HAWK beacon on Meridian Road in Tallahassee, Florida

A study released by the Federal Highway Administration observed a 29 percent reduction in total crashes, a 15 percent reduction in severe crashes, and a 69 percent reduction in pedestrian crashes, compared with an unsignalized intersection (no intersection treatment). Another report observed 97% motorists complied with the HAWK beacon. This is higher than crossings with flashing yellow beacons, but not for signalized intersections.

Some motorist confusion has been reported at newly installed HAWK beacons. When first introduced to an area, enforcement and public education are needed until users understand how the beacon works. When the beacon has not been activated, some drivers have acted as if the signal is dark due to a power outage, but this has not been experienced by all jurisdictions with HAWKs in operation. The flashing red phase is sometimes misunderstood by drivers farther back in the queue, and they follow the lead driver through the crosswalk instead of stopping at the stop line as required. Additionally, motorists sometimes remain stopped during the flashing red phase when the crosswalk is clear due to the similarity to a railroad crossing signal. In 2016, to help address this issue, the Federal Highway Administration authorized use of a new traffic sign, 'R10-23a', as an alternative sign to use at HAWK beacons. The alternative signage describes the steady red and flashing red aspects more clearly to drivers. The signage was also added in the 2023 edition of the MUTCD.

HAWK signals were widely adopted in Phoenix, Arizona starting in 2018, resulting in significantly fewer crashes and fatalities citywide.

== Issues with HAWK beacons ==
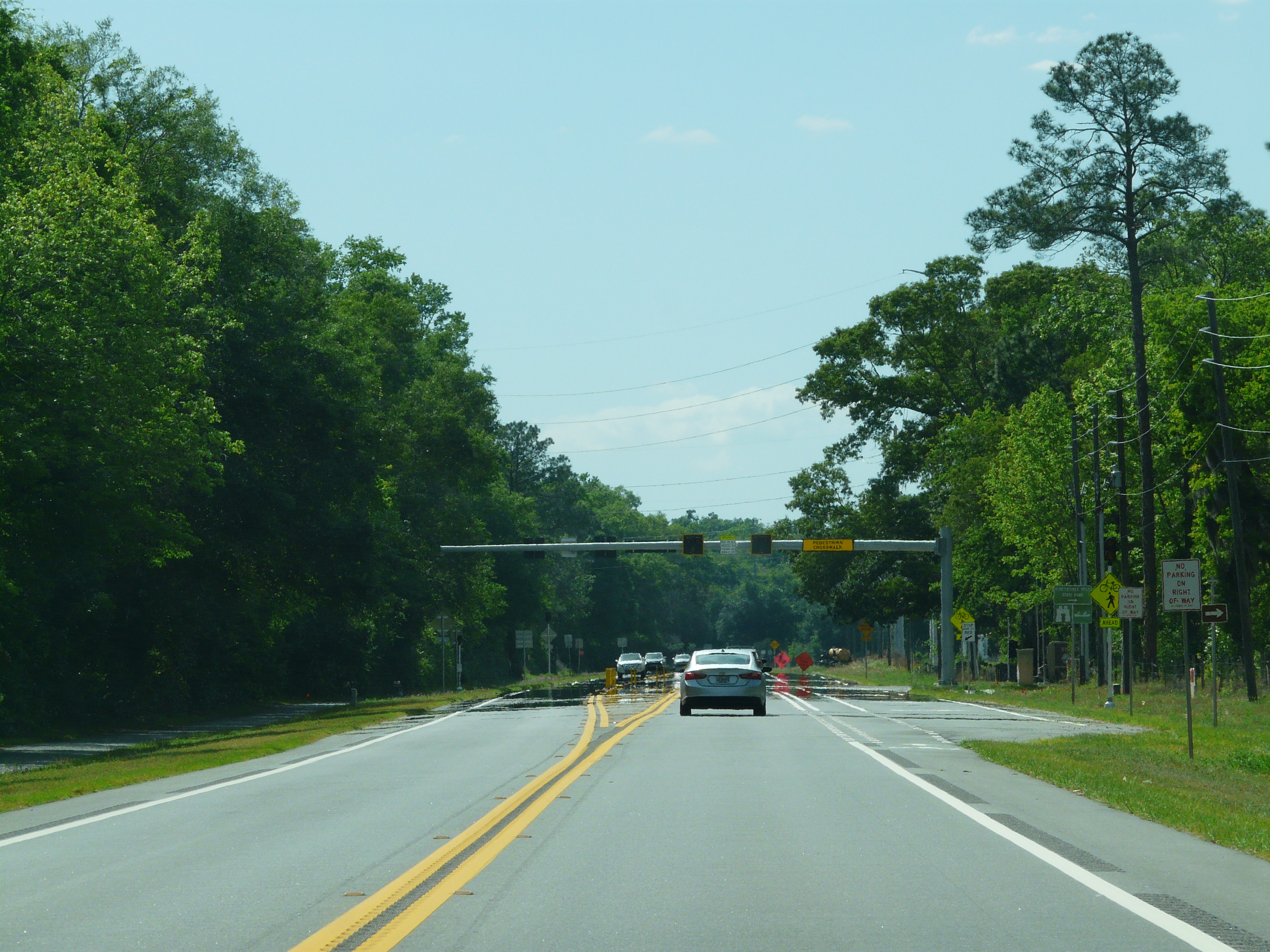
HAWK beacon on US-27 at Ichetucknee Springs State Park

The design and operation of the HAWK beacon/crossing differs materially from the meanings and operation of the same signal aspects when used in other contexts, and thus may be unintuitive to drivers unfamiliar with them:

- Some motor vehicle codes require that motorists stop at dark signals, which are typically indicative of an abnormality in the normal operation of the signal, such as a power failure. However, the dark signal is a normal display at HAWK beacons, where it designates the right-of-way for vehicular traffic. This results in an increase in rear-end collisions as some drivers stop and others do not. (When dark, the HAWK signal looks the same as any other traffic signal, and therefore only local drivers know that it is not a normal signal. Furthermore, even local drivers cannot determine if the signal is operative, unless they can see that there are no pedestrians. But the point of the signal is that drivers cannot see if there are pedestrians.)
- Drivers may fail to appreciate the conversion of a flashing yellow to a steady yellow signal, and thence fail to comprehend that the signal is about to change from steady yellow to red. Flashing yellow signals in other contexts are simply caution markers, and do not convert to steady yellow and thence to red in this way.
- At conventional traffic signals, the entire pedestrian crossing phase, including the entire flashing upright hand (don't walk) "pedestrian change interval" is protected from vehicle traffic of the roadway pedestrians are crossing. However, at HAWK crossings, during the flashing upright hand (don't walk) "pedestrian change interval", vehicles may legally proceed through the crosswalk after stopping. This could create a collision risk from a pedestrian not expecting a vehicle to enter the crosswalk.
- The arrangement and colors can confuse colorblind drivers given that the red and yellow lights can appear to be the same color and so depend upon placement to distinguish. Colorblind drivers may also rely on placement and assume that the bottom signal is green. If colorblind drivers misperceive the top two lights as yellow, this is contrary to the intention of the inventor R. B. Nassi, who said "We need to get red lights showing on these locations. Red means stop."

=== Alternating flashing red aspect ===
A HAWK beacon flashing red

The alternating flashing red aspect used with the HAWK beacon has a different meaning than other traffic control devices.

- The alternating flashing red (wig-wag) aspect is used in several other applications for vehicle control in the United States.
  - At railroad crossing signals, which several jurisdictions require drivers to treat as stop and stay.
  - On school buses, all states have laws that require drivers to stop and stay upon encountering it.
  - At moveable bridges, which must be treated as stop and stay.

The MUTCD states if two horizontally aligned red signal indications are used on an approach for an intersection control beacon, they shall be flashed simultaneously to avoid being confused with grade crossing flashing-light signals (e.g. railroad crossings). However, at a HAWK beacon, an alternating flashing red aspect instructs drivers to stop and proceed when clear, and is not supposed to be treated as stop and stay by drivers.

- Emergency-vehicle hybrid beacons, for emergency vehicle facilities (i.e. fire stations), use the same signal head design, and uses an alternating flashing red aspect to protect departing emergency vehicles. The only distinguishing part of the design is a different sign, R10-14, which is used with the signal. Unlike at a HAWK beacon, drivers are expected to remain stopped during this time to allow emergency vehicles to enter the roadway.

=== Alternatives to HAWK beacons ===
The following alternatives address or mitigate the above issues without abusing signal semantics:

- usage of a standard traffic signal for pedestrian traffic
- the installation of rectangular rapid flashing beacons (RRFB)

These alternatives may be more appropriate for jurisdictions concerned about the driver confusion and rear-end collisions associated with HAWK beacons.

In British Columbia, a pedestrian signal with a standard flashing green for go and a flashing red similar to the HAWK beacons for stop then yield is currently being tested on 16th Ave in Metro Vancouver near UBC.
