= Crossing guard =

Person who aids pedestrians at busy roadways

A crossing guard (North American English), lollipop woman/man/lady/person (British, Irish, and Australian English), or school road patrol (New Zealand English) is a traffic management personnel who is normally stationed on busy roadways to aid pedestrians. Often associated with school children, crossing guards stop the flow of traffic so pedestrians may cross an intersection.

Crossing guards are known by a variety of names, the most widely used in the United Kingdom, Ireland and Australia being "lollipop lady/woman/man/person", a reference to the large signs used that resemble lollipops. The verb is lollipopping, which can also be used for road works.

== Australia and the United Kingdom ==
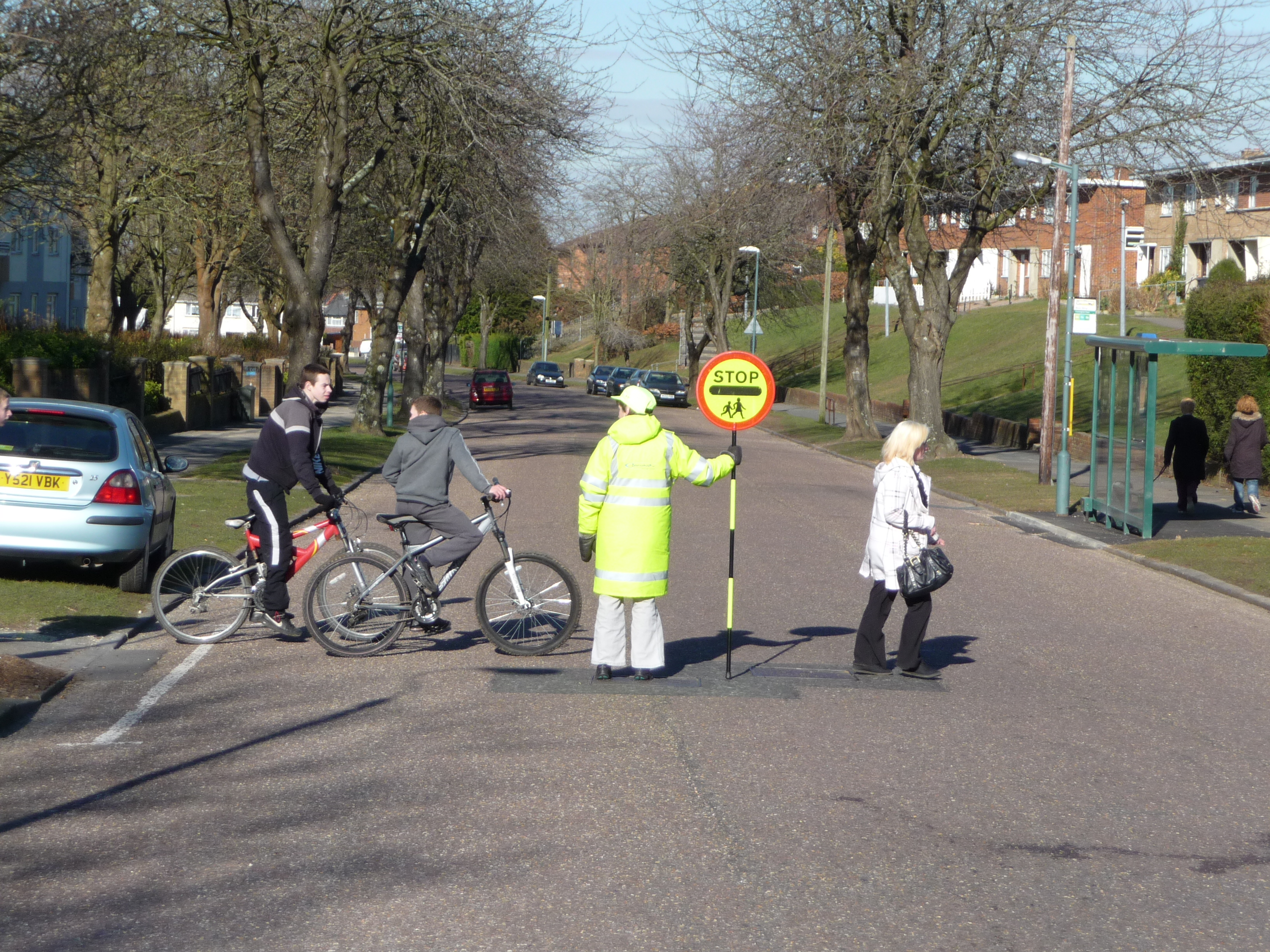
A "lollipop lady" in Bournemouth, England

In Australia and the United Kingdom, a school crossing supervisor or school crossing patrol officer is commonly known as a lollipop woman, lollipop man, lollipop lady, or lollipop person because of the modified circular stop sign that they carry on a stick, which resembles a large lollipop. The term was coined in the 1960s when road safety awareness programs were rolled out in schools throughout the UK and the crossing patrols were introduced by the Road Traffic Regulation Act 1967.

Ventriloquist John Bouchier visited schools nationwide with his ventriloquist dummy to help make children more aware of road safety. During these visits John's main character, a young boy named Charlie, referred to crossing patrol officers as "Lollipop men" for the first time. The term became widely used very quickly and has crossed into popular culture, both in the folk world (the common morris-dance tune "The Lollipop Man" has lewd lyrics in one tradition), and in the pop world (see the song by the band Sweet).

Research in the UK has revealed that crossing guards ('lollipoppers') are seen as the safest school crossing option by parents and children, with nine out of ten (92 per cent) believing that every school should have one.

In Australia, school crossing supervisors are employed by state government transport authorities and are posted at crossing sites by government officers. The exceptions to this rule are Victoria, where local councils employ crossing supervisors through their local laws department and Western Australia, where supervisors are known alternatively as police traffic wardens, and are employed by the traffic management unit of the WA Police. Supervisors in WA use handheld neon stop-flags instead of the traditional lollipop.

Under UK law it is an offence for a motorist not to stop if signalled to do so by a patroller. In the past, patrollers only had the authority to stop the traffic for children. The Transport Act 2000 changed the law so that a patroller had the authority to stop the traffic for any pedestrian.

In the UK, the stop sign has the word "STOP", a horizontal strip of black, and an international symbol for children (the symbol is sometimes replaced with the written word "CHILDREN"). The design is based upon the Vienna Convention international standard roadsign for "passing without stopping prohibited". The patrollers are employed by local authorities, but there is a greater degree of standardization of the system across the country than in the US. They are often older people who have retired from full-time employment. They may be based at a pelican crossing, a zebra crossing, or just an ordinary point on the road widely used as a crossing.

Due to an increase in abuse, threats and other aggressive behavior from some drivers, some lollipop people have been issued with cameras, either worn on the body or inside their sign, to record offending cars and registrations. In 1999 it was reported that training in coping with the problem of aggressive drivers would be provided to School Crossing Patrols in Derby.

=== Notable crossing guards ===
- Irene Reid (UK)
- Mike Nolan (AUS)

== Austria ==
In Austria the crossing guards are colloquially called Schülerlotse (German for "School Crossing Guard"). The service was initiated the first time in Salzburg in 1964. Most of the crossing guards are about 3,000 volunteers or men, liable for Zivildienst (an alternative mandatory community service, instead of military service). If volunteers or officials of the Zivildienst are not available, this service is fulfilled by officers of the local or federal police.

The legal denominations are Schülerlotse for students from the age of 11 until 18 and Schulwegpolizist (German for "School Crossing Police Officer") for persons over the age of 18. The Schülerlotse is legally not allowed to stop the traffic, just to show that students want to cross, the Schulwegpolizist is entitled to stop the traffic. The Schülerlotse are equipped with reflective jackets and a traffic signs.

== Germany ==
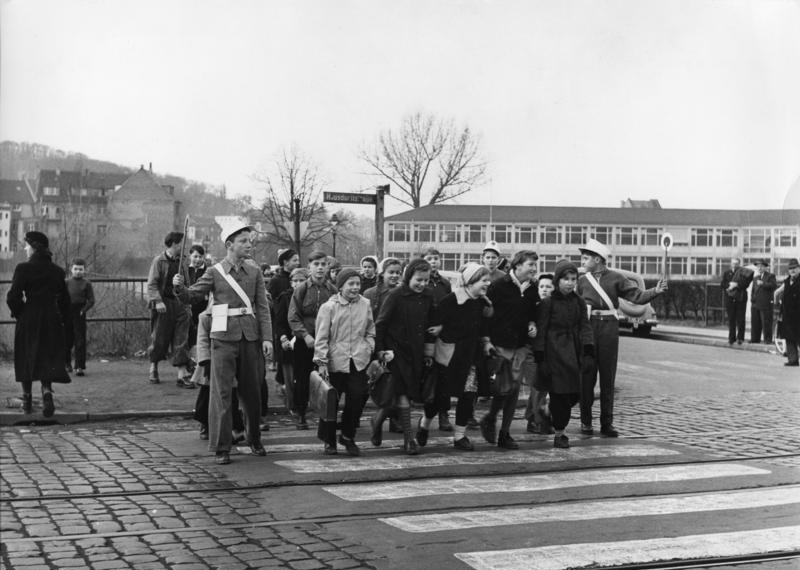
Verkehrshelfer in 1956 in Germany

In Germany the crossing guards are called Schülerlotse (pupil pilot), Verkehrshelfer (traffic assistant) or Schulweghelfer (way-to-school assistant). Due to the increasing traffic the first service started in 1954. Currently there are about 50,000 traffic assistants and traffic cadets in Germany, all of them are volunteers.

The traffic assistants are trained, organized and equipped by the Deutsche Verkehrswacht (German Traffic Watch Association) in cooperation with the respective state police. To become a traffic assistant, the candidate has to pass an exam which varies from state to state and lasts 6–12 hours. A Verkehrshelfer can become a Verkehrskadett (traffic cadet), if a higher level of training is passed, depending on the state's regulations about 32–120 hours. The Verkehrshelfer are equipped with reflective jackets and circular traffic signs. There is a ranking structure for traffic cadets and they wear uniforms while on duty.

== Republic of Ireland ==
Some school crossings are operated by junior traffic wardens, who are typically senior pupils at the school, working in teams of six.

== Japan ==
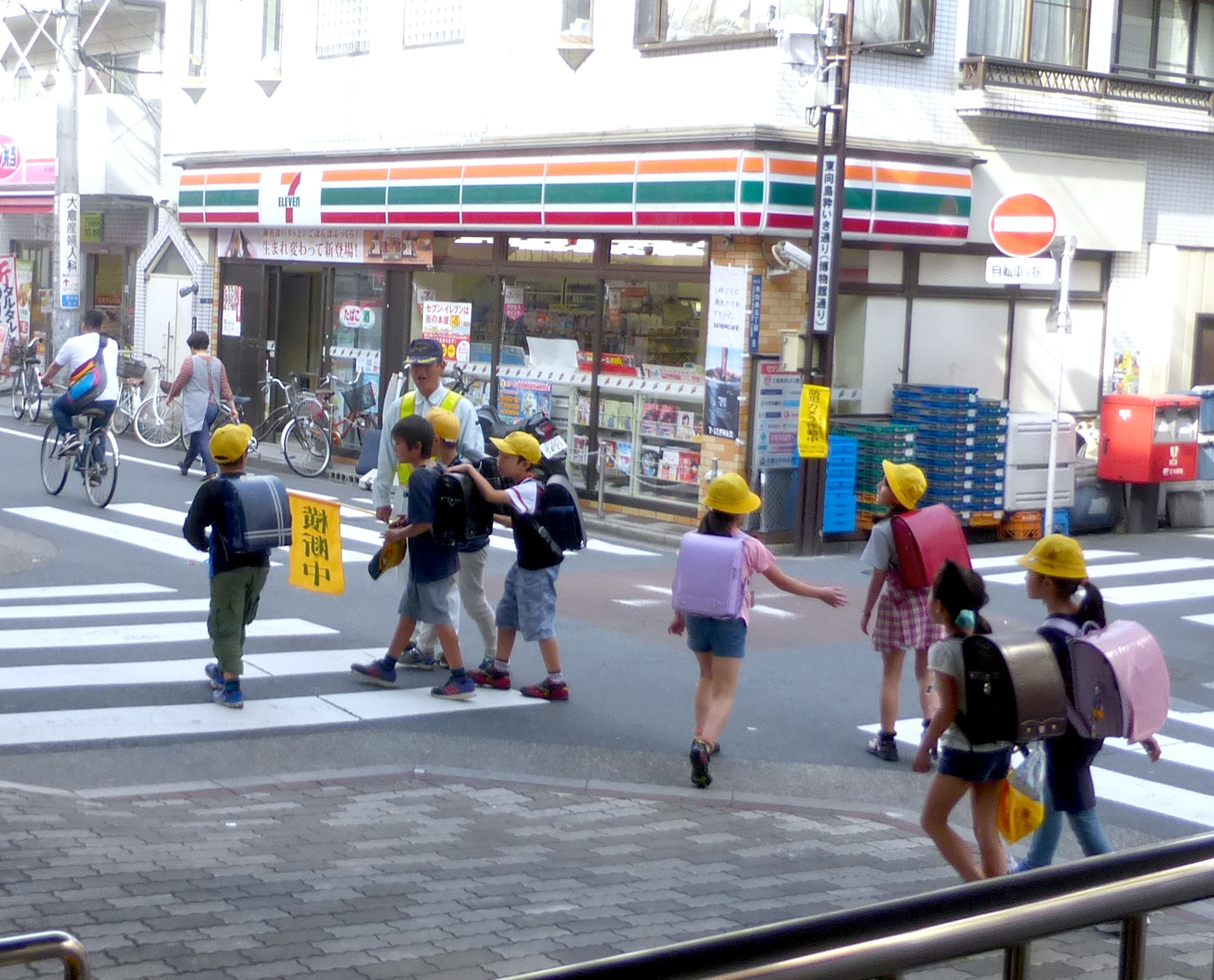
A crossing guard and children in Japan

Crossing guards in Japan are called Gakudōyōgoin (学童擁護員). The system started in Tokyo in 1959. It was founded as a way to offer employment to widows after World War II.

== New Zealand ==
In New Zealand, a school crossing patrol, officially called a School Traffic Safety Team, but more commonly known as a School Patrol or Road Patrol, was first introduced in 1931 and has been acknowledged in New Zealand legislation since 1944. Students and supervising teachers are in charge of running the patrols each day, with students being trained each year by the New Zealand Police. Around 950 school patrols operate nationally.

The two students on duty control and stop the flow of vehicles approaching a pedestrian crossing (or school crossing point) from either direction allowing school students to safely cross the road. This is done by extending orange school patrol signs onto the roadway in one or both directions so that the words "STOP - SCHOOL PATROL" is clearly displayed to any approaching driver. Once the traffic has stopped, one student verbally instructs pedestrians to cross the road.

One of the two students leads the crossing with a series of verbal calls. When a gap in the traffic appears the leader calls "signs out" (both signs are extended onto the road). "Check" (Both students check that traffic is stopping/stopped). "Cross now" (students may cross safely) and finally "signs in" (Signs are withdrawn from road).

All traffic is legally required to stop if one or more signs are being displayed. The stop signs used are mounted onto the pedestrian crossing poles which have a hinged bracket attached, allowing the students to easily and quickly extend (swing) the sign out onto the roadway, during breaks in the traffic. These signs are removed from the poles and stored away while the crossing is not in operation and are usually constructed from aluminium, allowing them to be light and relatively easy to carry by younger students.

Kea Crossings (school patrols that do not operate on pedestrian crossings), and School Traffic Wardens, are also in place at some New Zealand schools where low to medium traffic is present.

== Switzerland ==
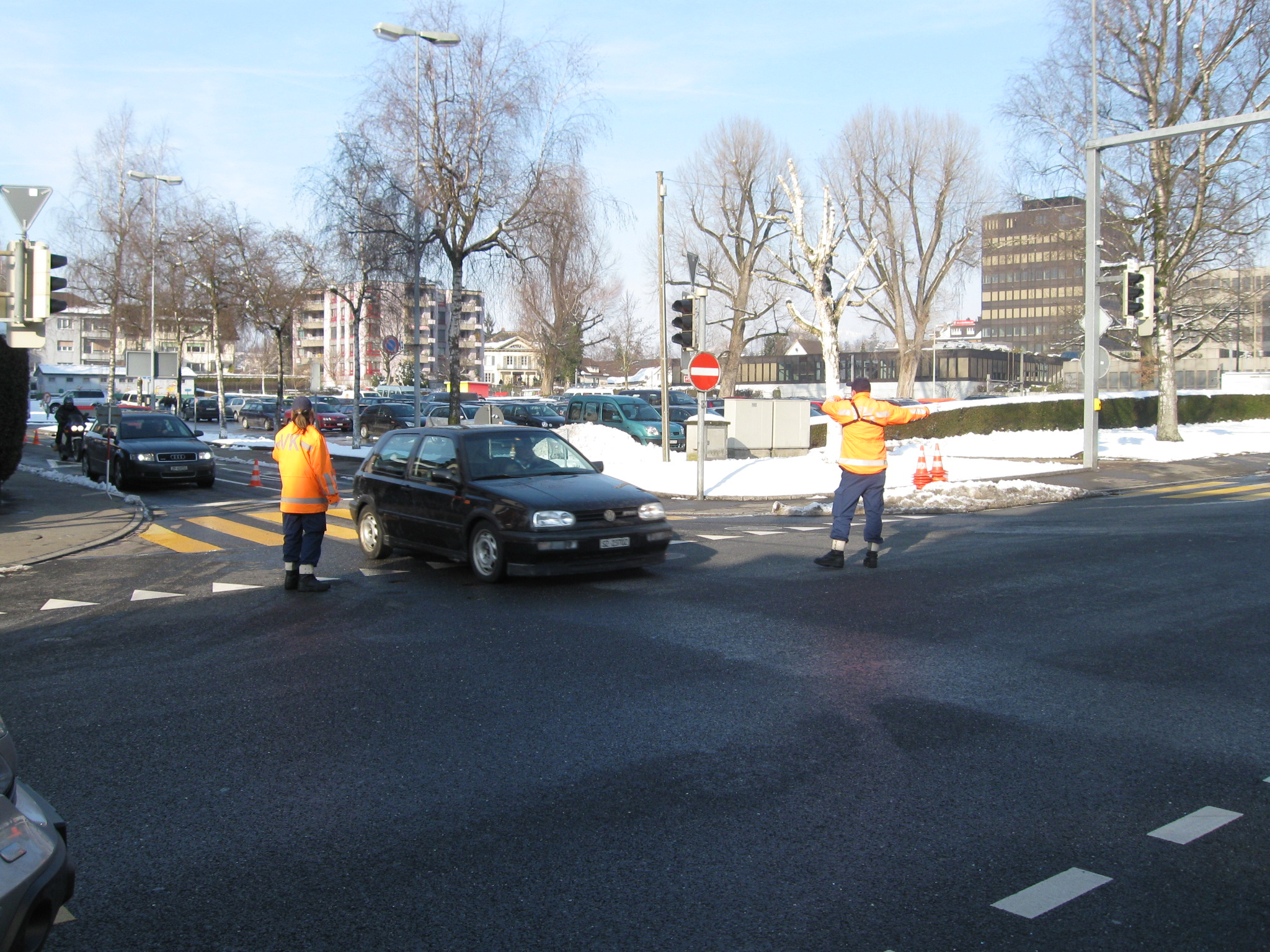
Traffic cadets in Switzerland

The crossing guard service in Switzerland is provided by traffic cadets organized by the Swiss Traffic Cadets Association. Depending on the canton the all volunteer cadets are equipped with different uniforms and a ranking structure.

== United States and Canada ==
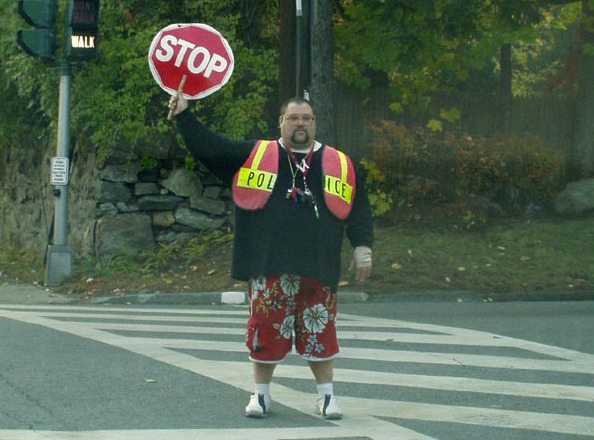
Crossing guard at a school crossing in the United States

Adult crossing guards guide children. No universal regulations exist that describe who may be a crossing guard, where crossing guards are stationed, or for what purposes a crossing guard may be employed. This person may be paid or volunteer; the person may be a school employee, a member of local law enforcement, a city employee, or contracted privately. Many elementary school crossing guards are assisted by older students, known by a variety of titles such as "safety monitor" and "safety patrol." These do not have legal responsibility for the safety of children.

The first school safety patrols were formed in the 1920s, because of growing concern for the well-being of students walking to school because of increasing fatalities and crossing incidents. The nation's first school patrol crossing was created in St. Paul, Minnesota on February 17, 1921. Another early safety patrol was established in Omaha, Nebraska in 1923.

Crossing guards, except those who are duly sworn public safety officers, have no arrest powers, may not write tickets, and may only forward the license plate numbers and other descriptors of alleged violators to local law enforcement, who decide what to do with that information; results may range from nothing at all to a verbal warning to a written summons and fine.

Similar procedures exist in most areas for school bus drivers, who may observe motorists disobeying the bus stop arm or flashing lights usually displayed when children are entering or exiting the bus.

Crossing guards are injured and/or killed every year. For example in Kansas City, Kansas, Bob S. Nill was credited with saving two children before being struck and killed by a distracted driver.

== Signs ==
Several countries have a unique sign for use by crossing guards to order traffic to stop. In Canada and the United States, crossing guards use a smaller version of the standard octagonal stop sign on a small pole. Australian crossing supervisors sometimes also use a normal octagonal stop sign, but often have other designs. In Japan, children sometimes hold a yellow flag themselves while crossing the street, or sometimes a crossing guard holds one while they cross.

Australia

Brunei

Canada

Chile

Germany

Hong Kong

Republic of Ireland

Israel

Japan

Mauritius

Netherlands

New Zealand

Peru

Poland school crossing sign

Singapore

United Kingdom
(Crown Dependencies and British Overseas Territories)

United States

== See also ==
- La Paz traffic zebras - a team of young people who dress in zebra costumes and dance in the streets of La Paz, Bolivia in order to make drivers and pedestrians aware of traffic rules
- School bus traffic stop laws
- Traffic cadet
- Traffic guard
- Traffic police
- Traffic warden
- Bylaw enforcement officer
- Traffic safety
- Walking bus
