= Traffic cadet =

Young person on road crossing duty

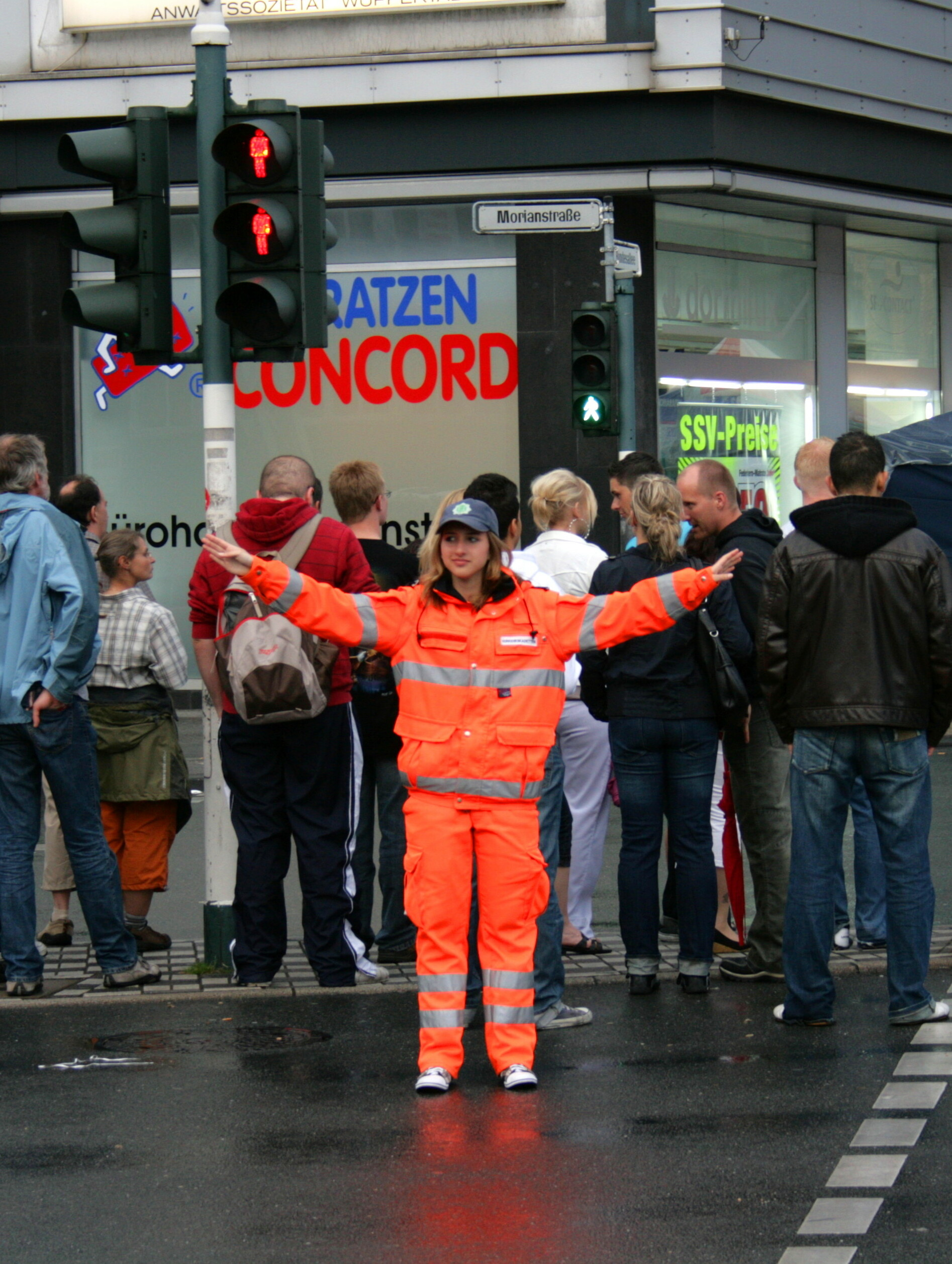
Traffic cadet on a road crossing in Wuppertal

In Germany and Switzerland, a traffic cadet (German Verkehrskadett, plural Verkehrskadetten) is a young person who manages traffic circulations as a crossing guard at events. They may work alone, but sometimes, they are assisted by police officers or vice versa.

== Germany ==
=== Organization ===
The Verkehrskadetten are the organization for youth of the Deutsche Verkehrswacht. They are joined by teenage traffic assistant, which assist the local police, the Code enforcement or the organizing committee at any kind of event.

=== Legal basis ===
Zeichen 356 – Verkehrshelfer

In laws, Verkehrskadetten are called Verkehrshelfer (traffic assistant). The legal basis since 1942 is article 42 of the German Highway Code and sign 356 (left). Until 1992, the sign was called Schülerlotse (crossing guard).

=== Education and examination ===
The training's duration depends on the city. It varies from two weekends to up to five months. The candidates are educated in subjects as the German Highway Code, First aid, Roadside assistance, securing an accident site, and many other things.

The examination consists of a theoretical and a practical part.

=== Operation ===
The Verkehrskadetten are a part of the Verkehrswacht, but they are managed by themselves. The finance their equipment and vehicles from donations, sponsoring, and the earned money only.

Verkehrskadetten are mostly employed at large events, where they assist the traffic. They may secure pedestrian crossings or close roads for a bike race.

The Verkehrskadetten are also contact people for passersby and respond to their questions.

=== Leisure time ===
To reward the teens for their work, the Verkehrskadetten often organize leisure activities.

=== Cooperation between Verkehrskadetten of different cities ===
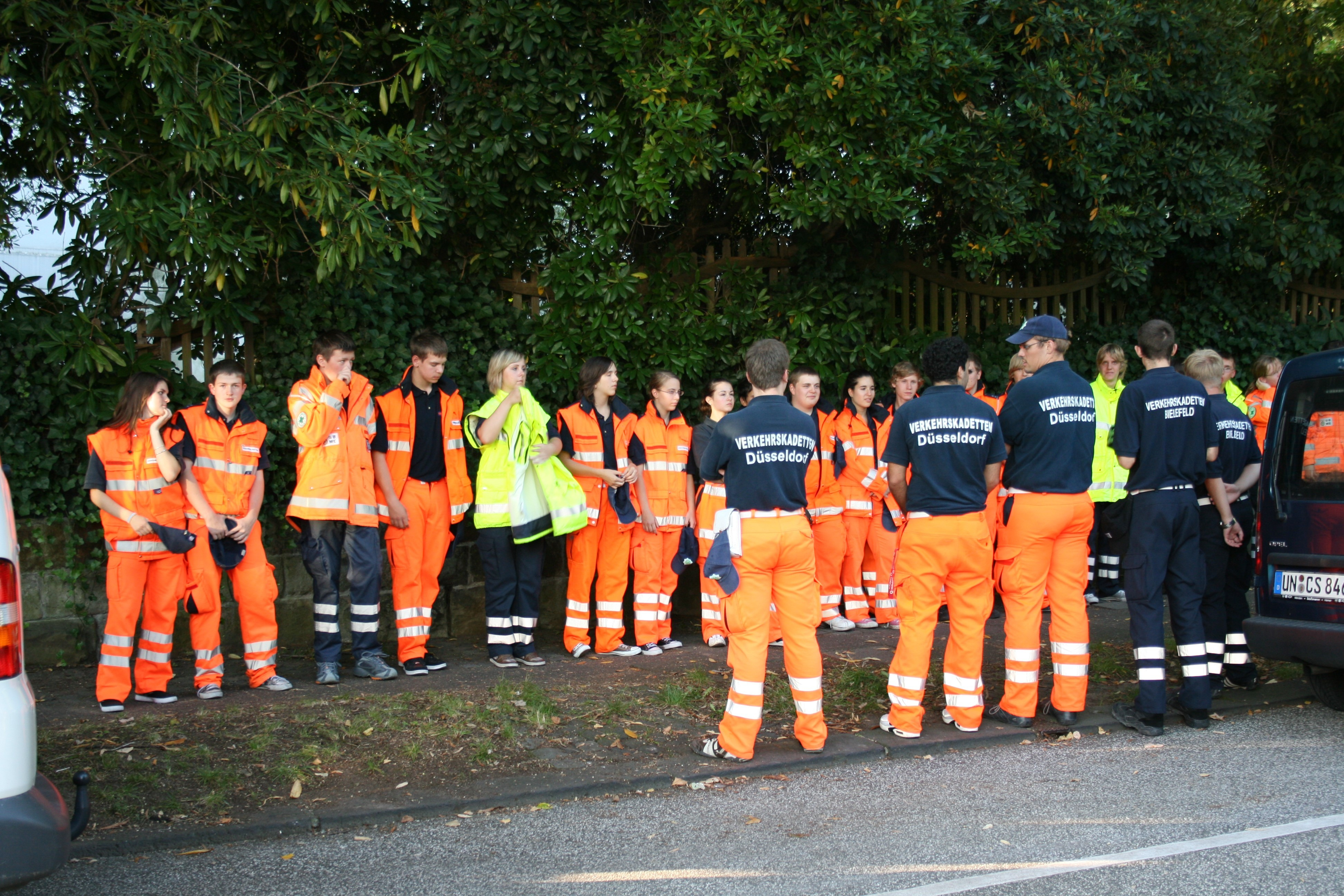
Verkehrskadetten from Bielefeld, Düsseldorf and Mettmann at the North Rhine-Westphalia-Day 2008 in Wuppertal

At large events, Verkehrskadetten of different cities assist each other, for example at the North Rhine-Westphalia-Day, where more than 70 Verkehrskadetten work together.

=== Ranks and structure ===
The Verkehrskadetten have various ranks, though there are differences between cities.

The most common rank order is:

- AW/VK-A - Anwärter (Candidate)
- VK - Verkehrskadett (Traffic cadet)
- OVK - Oberverkehrskadett (Upper traffic cadet)
- HVK - Hauptverkehrskadett (Major traffic cadet)
- UGL - Untergruppenleiter (Lower group leader)
- GL - Gruppenleiter (Group leader)
- OGL - Obergruppenleiter (Upper group leader)
- HGL - Hauptgruppenleiter (Major group leader)
- 1.HGL - 1. Hauptgruppenleiter (1st Major group leader)

=== Destinations ===
In the Deutsche Verkehrswacht, there are Verkehrskadetten of the following parts of Germany:

Aachen, Bielefeld, Coburg, Dortmund, Düsseldorf, Hamm, Kreis Kleve, Krefeld, Lichtenfels, Kreis Mettmann, Plauen, Sulzbach/Saar, Landkreis Teltow-Fläming, Landkreis Zwickau, and Solingen.

The Verkehrskadetten of Lower Saxony are not members of the Deutsche Verkehrswacht.

== Switzerland ==
=== Organization ===
- Swiss Verkehrskadetten Association
- Zürcherischer Verkehrskadetten Verband (Zurich Verkehrskadetten Association)

In Switzerland, all Verkehrskadetten Departments are members of the Swiss and/or the Zurich Verkehrskadetten Association. The Zurich Verkehrskadetten Association consists of Verkehrskadetten Departments of the canton of Zurich

=== Legal basis ===
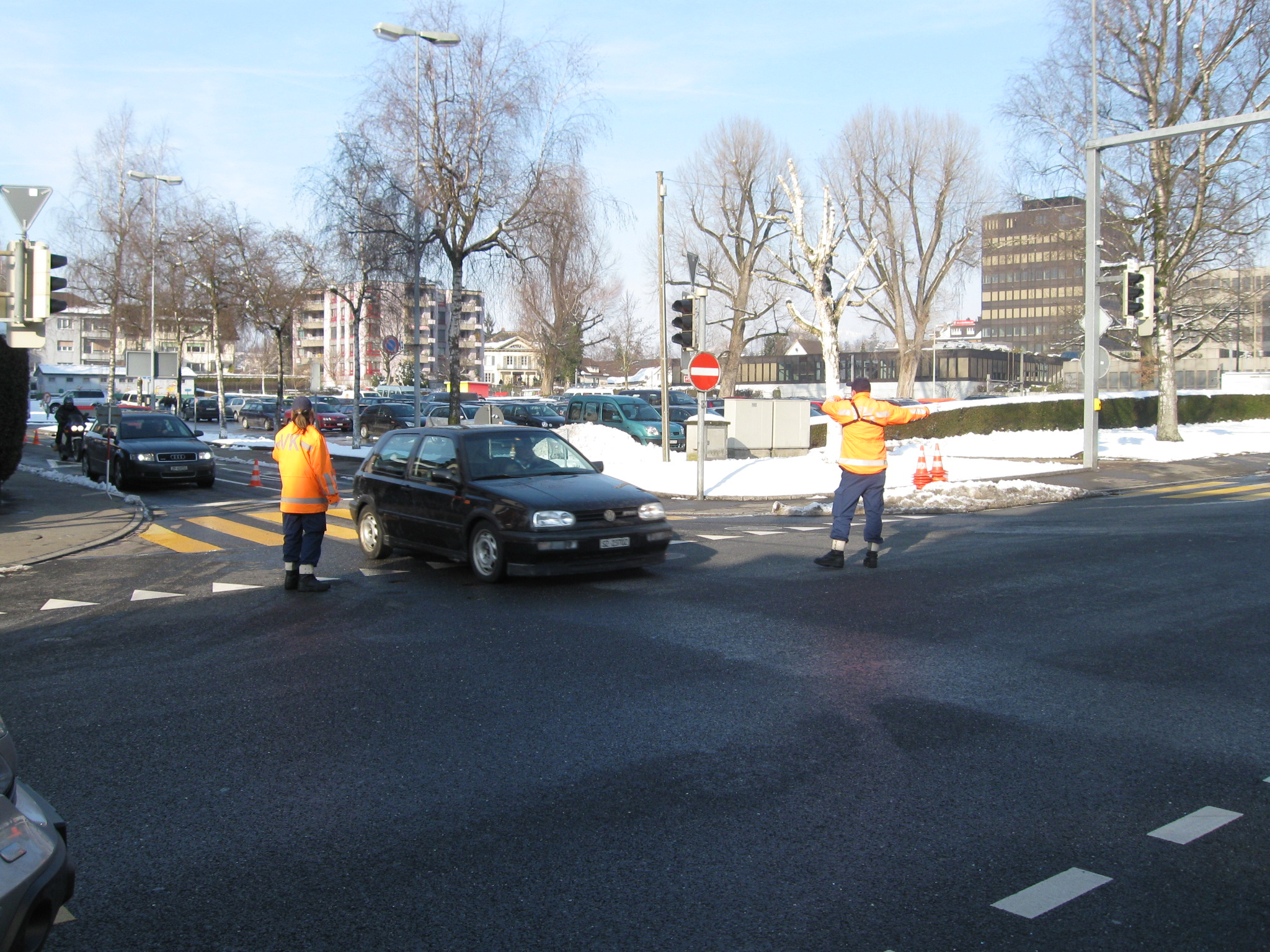
Two Verkehrskadetten regulating traffic at a busy intersection

In Switzerland, the legal basis for Traffic regulation by Verkehrskadetten is given by Article 67 paragraph 1 letter c. of the Signs Regulation Act (Signalisationsverordnung), which is based upon the Road Traffic Act (Strassenverkehrsgesetz). Article 67 of the Signs Regulation Act says, that signs and orders of Verkehrskadetten are binding to everyone.

=== Education and examination ===
In Switzerland, the education consists for example of transport services, parking, creating detours, usage of two-way radios, and First aid. The candidates are examined by officers of the local or cantonal Police Department.

=== Operation ===
In Switzerland, the Verkehrskadetten Departments are clubs referred to Article 60 etc. of the Swiss Civil Code. According to that, the Departments are independent. For little money, they can be hired by anyone.

=== Uniforms ===
The Verkehrskadetten must be equipped according to norm EN471 (SN471). Members of the Swiss Verkehrskadetten Association are obtaining this rule.

=== Verkehrskadetten Departments of Switzerland ===
- Members of the Swiss Verkehrskadetten Association: VKA-Albis, VKA-Appenzellerland, VKA-Aussersschwyz, Kadetten-Korps Basel (KKB), VKA-Bern, VKA-Chur, VKA-Fürstenland, VKA-Glarnerland, Verkehrskadetten Nordwestschweiz (VK-NWS), VKA-Rapperswil-Jona, VKA-St. Gallen, VKA-St. Galler Oberland, VKA-Schaffhausen, VKA-Samstagern-Richerswil, VKA-Winterthur, VKA-Zug, VKA-Zürcher-Oberland, VKA-Zürcher-Unterland und VKA-Zürichsee
- Others: VKA-Thurgau und VKA-Oberaargau (not members of the Swiss Verkehrskadetten Association)

== See also ==
- Traffic guard
- Crossing guard
