= Traffic guard =

Person who directs traffic through a temporary traffic control zone

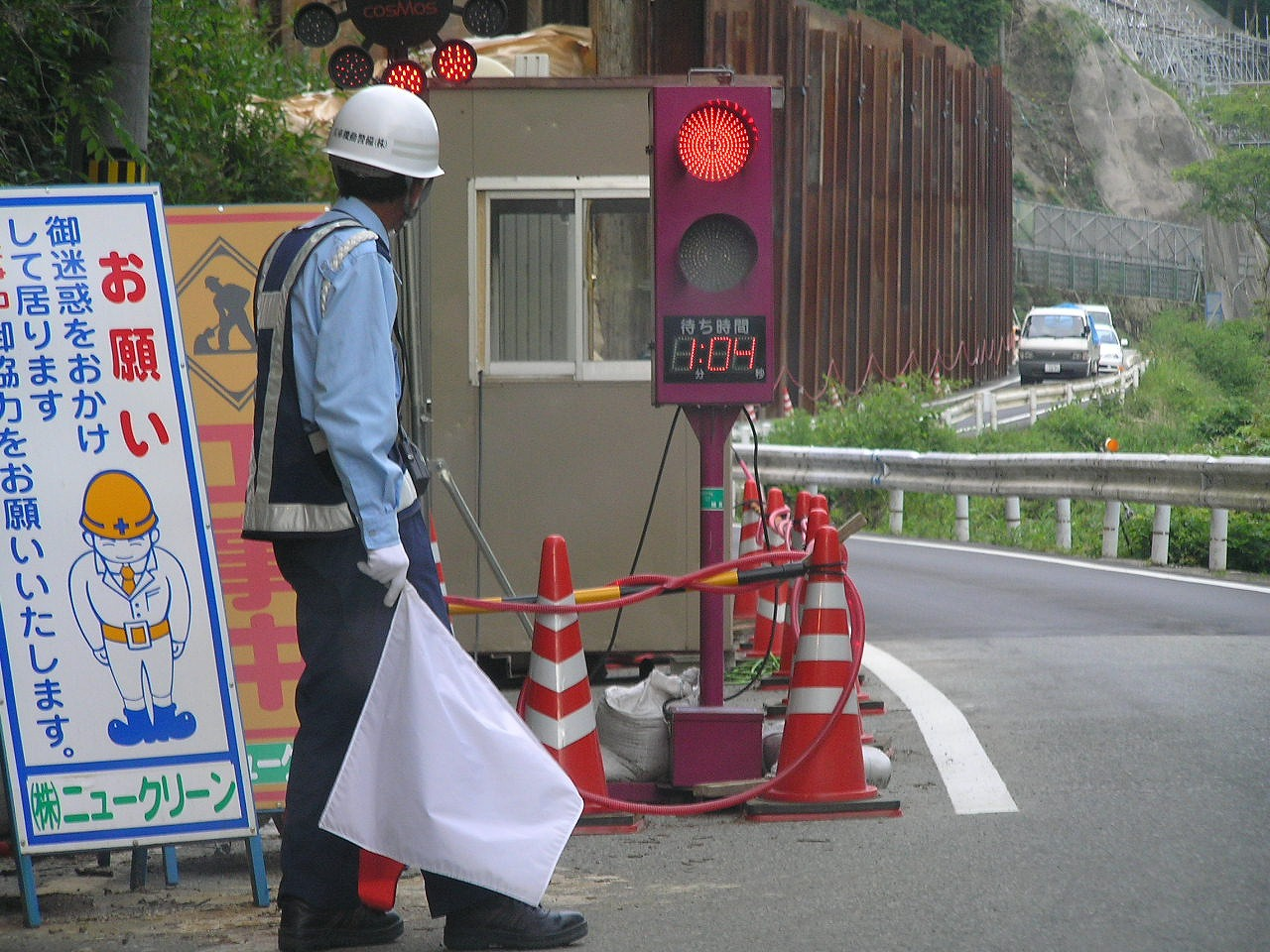
- Japanese traffic guard

Occupation
- Names: Flagger, Traffic Controller, Traffic Marshall/Traffic Marshal
- Occupation type: Employment
- Activity sectors: Traffic, Security

Description
- Related jobs: Traffic Police, Security Guard

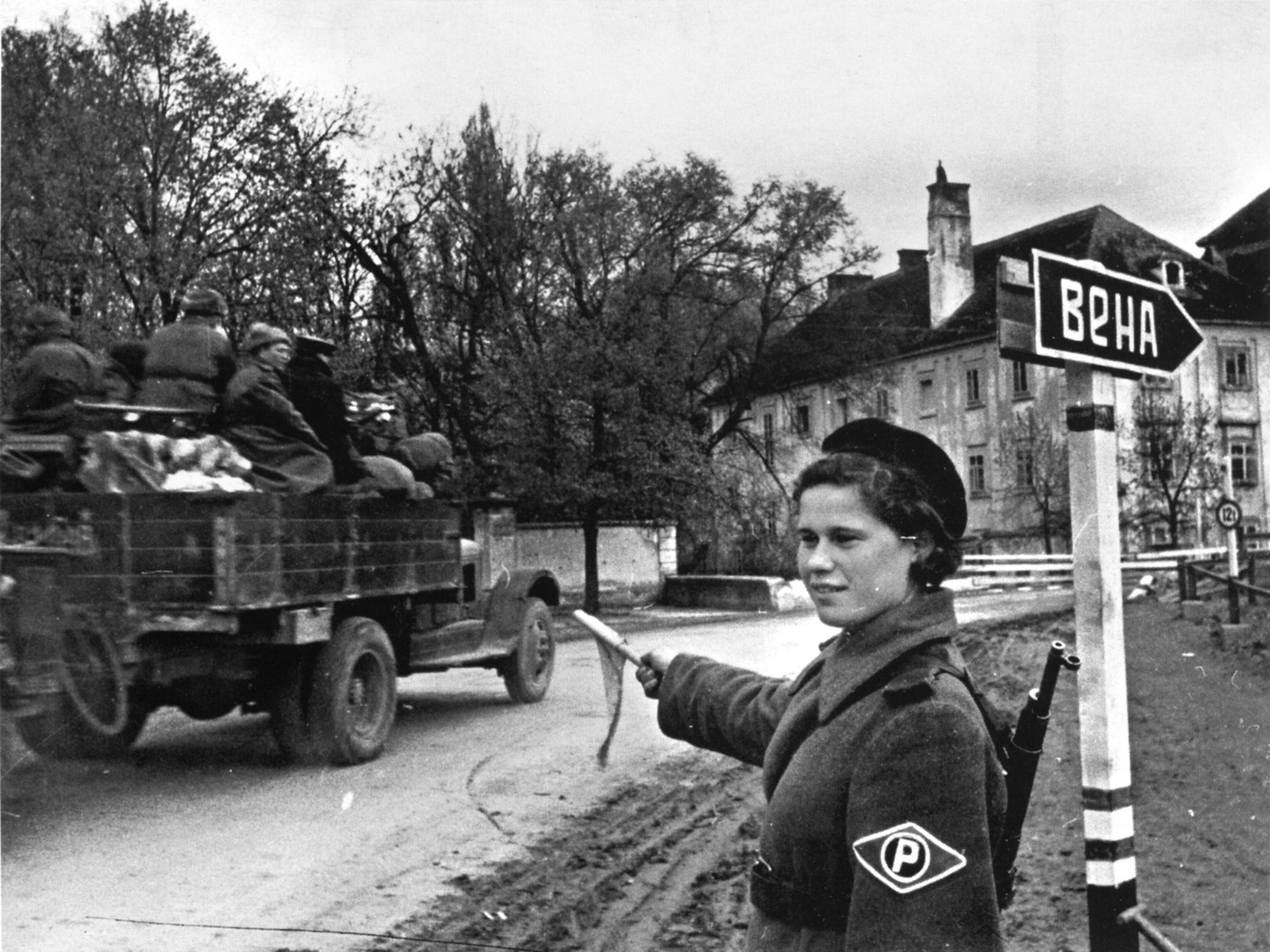
Soviet traffic guard N. Klimenko in the suburbs of Vienna

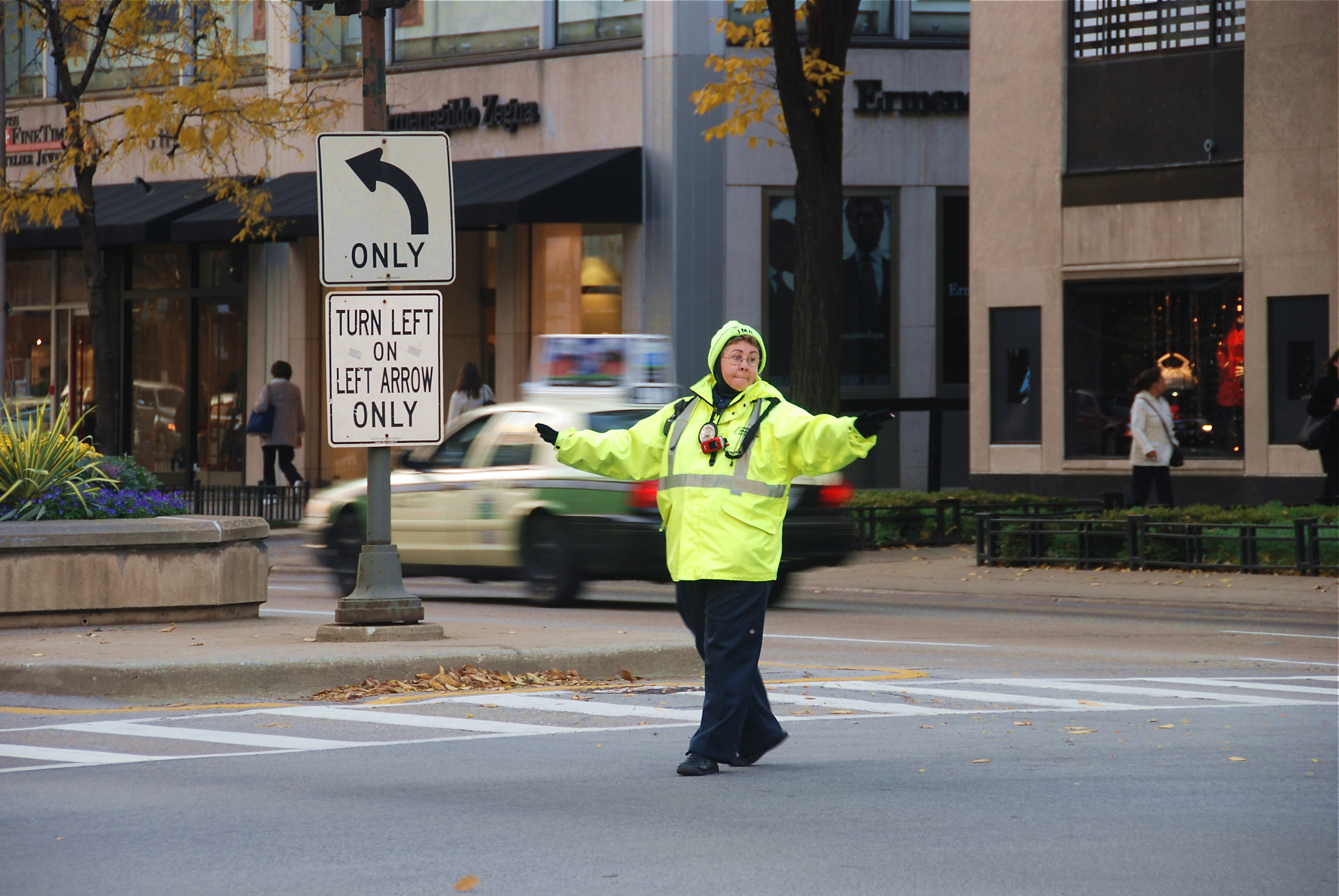
Traffic guard on Michigan Avenue in Chicago

Traffic guards, also known as traffic controllers, traffic marshalls/traffic marshals or flaggers, are trained to set up warning signs and barricades to slow down the speed of traffic in a temporary traffic control zone. When they are on scene they will set up equipment to warn approaching traffic about the incident.

== Equipment ==
Traffic guards use a variety of equipment:

- Signal flags.
- Signal hand sign; called stop/slow paddles in the United States, these are a sign that has 'stop' on one side and 'slow' or 'go' on the other side.
- Traffic vest.
- Helmet (or a hard hat); protecting the head from hazards.

== Automated traffic controls ==
In some cases, alternatives to human traffic guards are used for traffic control. Traffic guards may be assisted by Automated flagger assistance devices (AFADs) so that they can stay out of the roadway when directing traffic. Temporary traffic lights or yield signs may also be used as an alternative to human traffic guards.

== See also ==
- Traffic police
- State police
- Security police
- Security guard
- Parking enforcement officer
- Highway patrol
- Crossing guard
- Level crossing
- Road traffic control
- Road traffic safety
- Roadworks
- Traffic barrier
- Traffic cadet
