= Irene Reid (lollipop lady) =

British lollipop lady

Irene Reid MBE
- Born: 1940 or 1941
- Occupation: Lollipop lady
- Years active: 1968–2025
- Title: Member of the Most Excellent Order of the British Empire

Irene Reid, MBE (born 1940 or 1941) is a British lollipop lady who, in 2017, was declared the UK's longest-serving lollipop lady.

Reid works as a lollipop lady in Longridge, Ribble Valley, covering the Longridge Church of England Primary School crossing on Berry Lane. In 2003, she was awarded the Golden Jubilee Lollipop Person of the year. In 2012, she was declared the longest-serving lollipop lady in Lancashire and was appointed an MBE by Elizabeth II for her services to road safety. In 2017, it was estimated Reid had ferried pupils across the road 1.3 million times.

In June 2024, Reid received a special award from Lancashire County Council for her 55 years of service. She told the BBC: "I've done this job for so long really because of the people in Longridge. They are so nice; they're all behind me."

Reid has been outspoken about crossing safety for children, openly criticising plans by Lancashire County Council in 2014 to reduce funding for crossing patrols. Reid also worked with the Longridge Youth and Community Centre for a decade. In mid 2024, she was aged 84 and a great-grandmother of 10. Reid is in a relationship with Hawklords musician Harvey Bainbridge. She appeared on the British television game show Blankety Blank in 2021.
