= School bus traffic stop laws =

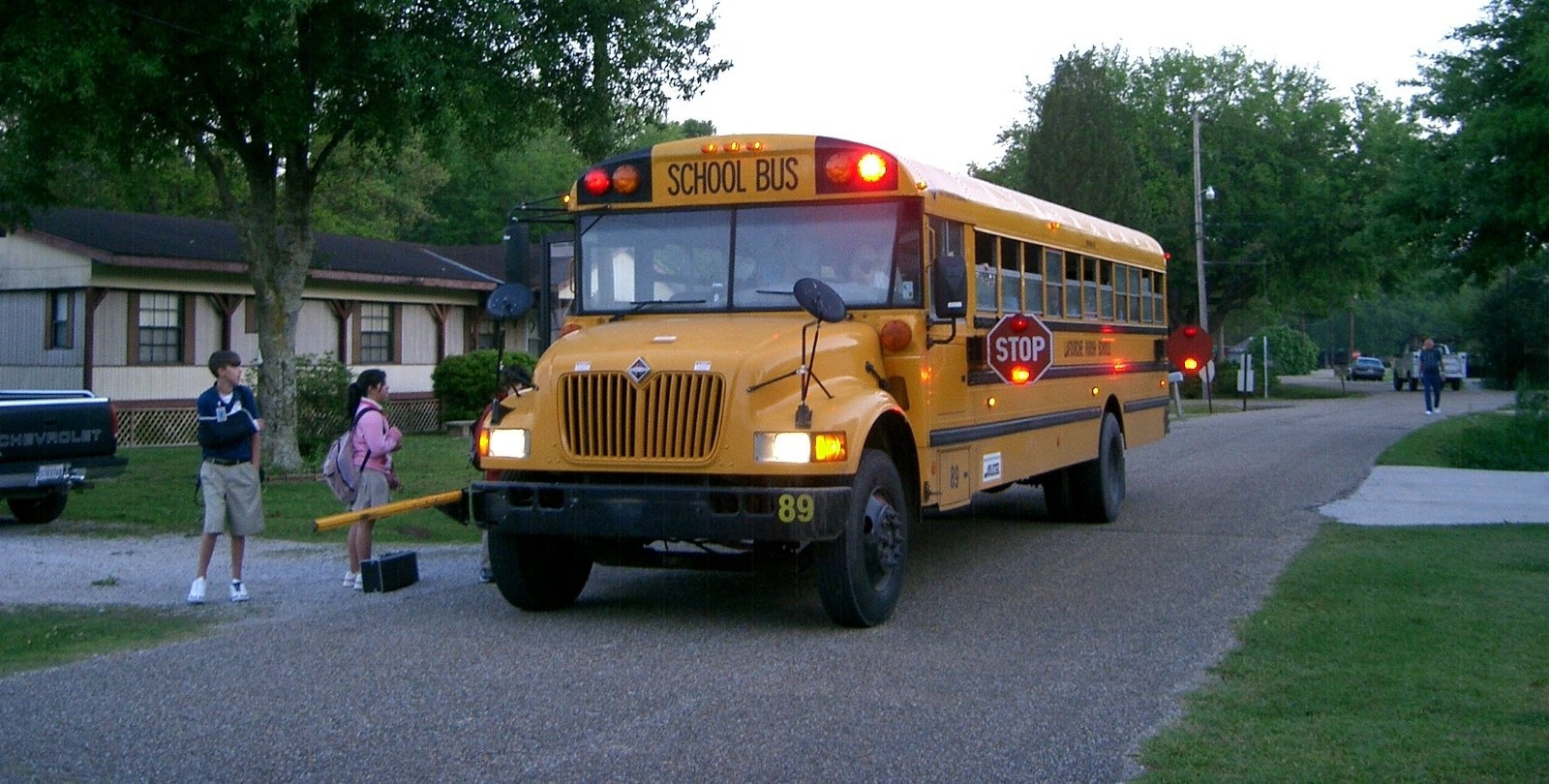
A school bus at a stop, with its crossing arm, stop signs and red lights activated. Some jurisdictions, mostly all in North America, require all surrounding vehicles to stop when a school bus is stopped with its red lights flashing.

School bus stop laws are laws dictating what a motorist must do in the vicinity of a bus stop being used by a school bus or other bus, coach or minibus providing school transport.

== United States and Canada ==
Jurisdictions in the United States (including overseas territories) and Canada have adopted various school bus stop laws that require drivers to stop and wait for a stopped school bus loading or unloading, so as to protect school children boarding or alighting.

Generally, if a stopped school bus is displaying a flashing, alternating red lamp, a driver of a vehicle meeting or overtaking the stopped bus from either direction (front or back) must stop and wait until the bus moves again or the red light is off. Police officers, school crossing guards, and even school bus drivers themselves may have the power to wave traffic on, even when a red light is flashing.

On divided highways, most American and Canadian jurisdictions do not require vehicular drivers to stop when on the opposite side of the road from a stopped school bus. Those that do require vehicles to stop are:

- West Virginia upon a non-controlled-access highway{§17C-12-7}
- Arkansas in case a divider has less than 20 feet (6 m) in width (narrow divider).
- American Samoa
- Guam
- British Columbia
- Nova Scotia
- Prince Edward Island
- Northwest Territories
- Nunavut

American and Canadian jurisdictions have sought to deter illegal passing stopped school buses by increased enforcement and heavy penalties, including fines, application of demerit points against a driver's license or even license suspension. Nevertheless, violations are common. An officer must witness the violation, and even when citations issued, getting convictions is often difficult; sometimes traffic courts consider the evidence insufficient, or reduce the charge because the penalty for a first offense seems excessive. There are, however, exceptions. Missouri has Jessica's Law, which grants the right of a school bus driver to report the offense, in which case the driver is automatically cited. Some jurisdictions, like Cobb County, an urban county in Metro Atlanta, have added bus cameras as a deterrent, which can detect and automatically report vehicles passing a bus.

=== Exceptions ===
Drivers in Washington state are not required to stop for a school bus on any highway (Under Washington law, any public road is defined as a highway) with three or more lanes when traveling in the opposite direction. This has been interpreted to mean that when approaching a bus from the opposite direction on a normal road with a turn lane, or a road with two lanes in each direction, etc., a driver is not required to stop their vehicle. This is an unusual law, but arguably leads to a higher safety level for children, as they are then required to be picked up or dropped on the same side of the road as the bus exit on anything greater than a two-lane road as provided by RCW 46.61.370. Ohio has a similar exception for roads with four or more lanes.

Drivers in Idaho and Kentucky are not required to stop for a school bus on any highway with four or more lanes when traveling in the opposite direction, even if the only divider is a double yellow line.

Drivers in California do not have to stop on any highway that is divided or is multi-lane (2 or more lanes of travel in each direction) when traveling in the opposite direction.

In Pennsylvania, the only vehicle that may pass a stopped school bus with the red lights flashing is an emergency vehicle with its flashing lights and siren activated, but only after the emergency vehicle has come to a complete stop and proceeds with due caution for any students embarking or disembarking.

=== Enforcement ===
In New York State, an official estimate is that 50,000 vehicles pass stopped school buses illegally every day. However, as New York State requires traffic to stop for a school bus stopped on the opposing roadway of a divided highway, the estimate may include "New York violations" that would be legal in other states. The New York State Department of Transportation once recommended that the State Legislature exempt traffic from stopping for a school bus stopped on the opposing roadway of a divided highway, but this has not been done.

On a national basis, school bus drivers in the United States have reported a decrease in passing violators in recent years with improved warning devices. Despite an increase in traffic and school bus ridership, annual fatalities and injuries to children struck by other vehicles has decreased as well. However, it is unclear whether having reported a decrease in passing violators is due to difficulty to report or better compliance by motorists.

When and where enforcement against violators becomes too hard, some residential streets may prohibit entry of vehicles other than school buses at certain times to effectively eliminate passing stopped school buses illegally.

The National Conference of State Legislators has reported an increase in the number of states using school bus stop-arm cameras to record motorists who violate school bus traffic laws. With this innovative technology they can identify and punish violators.

== Other countries outside North America ==
Traffic laws in other countries do not require vehicles to stop.

The speed limit is 40 km/h (24.9 mph) in Australia and 20 km/h (12.4 mph) in New Zealand when passing a stopped school bus. In New Zealand, the New Zealand Transport Agency decided that the speed limit passing a stopped school bus should not be raised based on probabilities of pedestrian deaths if hit at different speeds, nor has it supported requiring fully stopping and waiting for school buses loading and unloading children as in the United States and Canada.

In Belgium and Germany, traffic is required to pass stopped school buses at very slow speeds that allow for quick stopping. While in South Korea, Japan, Taiwan, and the United Kingdom, drivers are directed to drive carefully past stopped school buses.
