= Disability Pride Month =

Observance

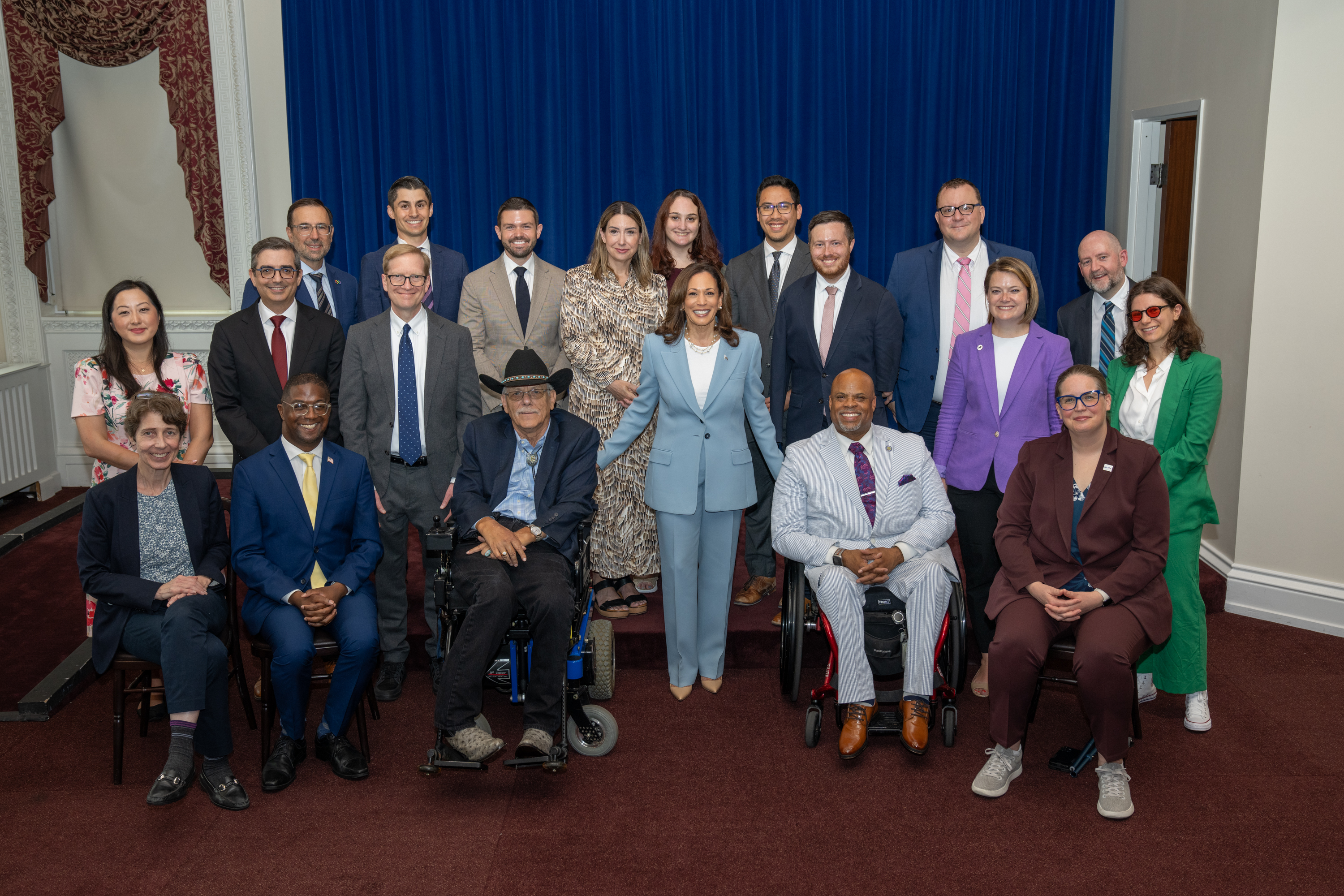
Vice President Kamala Harris with staff in honor of Disability Pride Month, 2024

Disability Pride Month occurs worldwide, usually in July. Disability Pride has evolved from a day of celebration to a month-long event.

It originated in the United States to commemorate the passing of the landmark Americans with Disabilities Act (ADA) in July 1990. Disabled people make up 16% of the world's population representing all ages, races, ethnicities, genders, sexual orientations, religions, and socio-economic backgrounds.

Disability Pride Month celebrates people with disabilities, their identities, their culture, and their contributions to society. It also seeks to change the way people think about and define disability, to end the stigma of disability, and to promote the belief that disability is a natural part of human diversity in which people living with disabilities can celebrate and take pride. It is a chance for people with disabilities to come together and celebrate being themselves, no matter their differences. It is also a chance to raise awareness of the challenges they still face every day to be treated equally.

== History ==
=== United States ===
On March 12, 1990, over 1,000 people marched from the White House to the U.S. Capitol to demand that Congress pass the Americans with Disabilities Act. Upon arrival, about 60 activists, including eight-year-old Jennifer Keelan-Chaffins, physically demonstrated the inaccessibility of public spaces by getting out of their wheelchairs or setting aside their mobility aids and crawling up the Capitol steps in an act of civil disobedience that later became known as the Capitol Crawl. Police then arrested 104 activists for unlawful demonstration, many of whom were in their wheelchairs.

On July 26, 1990, President George H. W. Bush signed the Americans with Disabilities Act into law. Disability Pride Month was first celebrated in July 2015, commemorating the ADA's 25th anniversary.

=== United Kingdom ===
England, Scotland and Wales have a similar law that was passed in 1995 called the Disability Discrimination Act, that was itself replaced by the Equality Act in 2010. People in Northern Ireland are protected by the Disability Discrimination Act 1995.

== Disability Pride ==
The concept of Disability Pride was born out of the Disability Rights movement and based on intersectional identity politics and social justice. The core concept of Disability Pride is based on a tenet of reworking the negative narratives and biases that frequently surround the concept of disability. Disability Pride is a response and counteraction against ableism and social stigma. The concept has roots in the same social theory that backs LGBT Pride and Black Pride. Disability Pride is a movement intended to celebrate the history of the Disability Rights movement and disabled people as positive contributors to society. It marks a break from traditional concepts of disabilities as shameful conditions, which were often hidden from public spaces and mainstream awareness. Disability Pride is built upon the social model of disability and is described as moving away from the medical model of disability.

== Locations ==
Disability Pride is celebrated worldwide, including in the United Kingdom, South Africa, and other countries during various times of the year. Other Disability Pride Celebrations have occurred in England, Germany, New Zealand, Norway, Switzerland, and South Korea.

Country	City	# of Parades	First Parade	Last Parade
Finland	Helsinki	1	2026	
Finland	Oulu	1	2026	
Finland	Tampere	3	2024	
New Zealand	Wellington	1	2021	-
Poland	Warsaw	1	2026	-
Switzerland	Zürich	5	2016	-
United Kingdom	Brighton, England	3	2017	-
United Kingdom	Mansfield, England	1	2023	
United Kingdom	Chester, England	1	2023	-
United Kingdom	Leeds, England	1	2023	
United Kingdom	Reading, England	1	2023	-
United Kingdom	Belfast, Northern Ireland	1	2014	-
United States	Boston, MA	2	1990	2014
United States	Chicago, IL	22	2004	-
United States	Mountain View, CA	5	2010	2014
United States	Columbia, MO	1	2010	-
United States	Logan, UT	1	2010	-
United States	Davis, CA	1	2010	-
United States	Trenton, NJ	5	2011	2015
United States	Philadelphia, PA	11	2012	-
United States	Colorado Springs, CO	1	2012	-
United States	Nacogdoches, TX	4	2014	2017
United States	Columbus, OH	1	2014	-
United States	New York, NY	5	2015	-
United States	Atlanta, GA	1	2015	-
United States	Buffalo, NY	2	2016	2017
United States	Los Angeles, CA	2	2016	-
United States	Pittsburgh, PA	1	2022	-
United States	Bloomington, Illinois	2	2021	2022
United States	Lehigh Valley, Pennsylvania	1	2023	-
United States	Harrisburg, Pennsylvania	1	2022	-

== Celebration and Recognition ==
=== US ===
People with disabilities make the largest and most diverse minority in the United States making up approximately 26% of the population. As of 2022, Disability Pride Month is not yet nationally recognized in the United States.

The celebration has been officially recognized by New York City mayor Bill de Blasio and San Francisco mayor London Breed.

A Disability Pride Parade is held annually to celebrate Disability Pride Month in Chicago, Los Angeles, New York, San Francisco, San Antonio, Philadelphia, and Pittsburgh, among other places. Disability Pride Parades often hold traditions unique to the location, like a disability justice flag raise at city hall and a full week of free events in Philadelphia.

==== Boston, Massachusetts ====
The first Disability Pride Day was held October 6, 1990 in Boston, Massachusetts. According to a newspaper clipping from the day, "more than 400 people marched, drove, wheeled and moved from City Hall to Boston Common in a demonstration to affirm that 'far from tragic, disability is a natural part of the human experience.'" The featured speaker was Karen Thompson, author of Why Can't Sharon Kowalski Come Home? Robert Gaspari was one of the four MCs for the program introducing guests to the venue. It was held again in 1991 but ended after that due to the death of lead organizer, Diana Viets, and with the move of co-organizer Catherine Odette to Madison, Wisconsin.

==== Chicago, Illinois ====
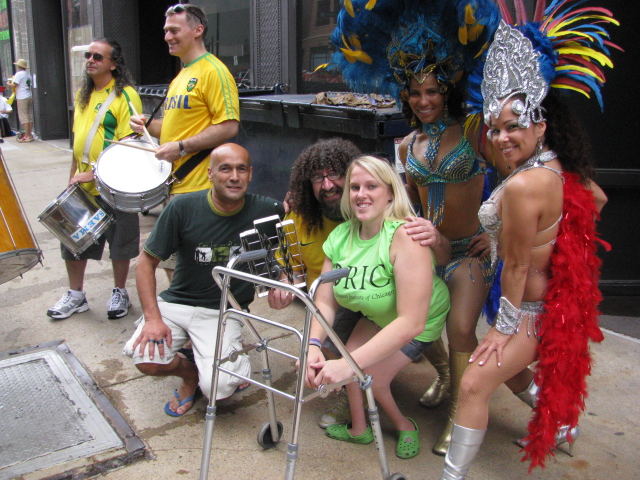
Disability Pride Parade 2011 participants

The first Chicago Disability Pride Parade was the first such parade in the United States after the Boston-based parades of the 1990s. It was held July 18, 2004 in Chicago with Yoshiko Dart as the Parade Grand Marshal. The first Chicago parade was funded with $10,000 in seed money that Sarah Triano received in 2003 as part of the Paul G. Hearne Leadership award from the American Association of People with Disabilities. According to Triano, fifteen hundred people attended the parade. Disability Pride Parades have been held in Chicago each subsequent July with a theme and a grand marshal each year with the exception of 2020 and 2021 due to the COVID-19 pandemic.

Chicago Disability Pride Parade Date	Theme	Grand Marshal
July 18, 2004	Unified in Pride	Yoshiko Dart
July 23, 2005	Unity Builds Community	Steven Brown
July 22, 2006	Celebrating Disability Arts and Culture	Robert David Hall
July 21, 2007	Celebrating Worldwide: Disabled, Proud, Present, Diverse	Kathy Martinez
July 26, 2008	Pride Realized Is Destiny Empowered	Tony Coelho
July 25, 2009	Changing to Pride	Amber Smock
July 24, 2010	Pride Revolution	Eli Clare
July 23, 2011	Disability Pride is Contagious	Catherine Odette
July 21, 2012	Disability Pride: Today, Tomorrow, and Forever	Linda Miller
July 20, 2013	10th Year of Chicago Disability Pride Parade	Karen Meyer
July 19, 2014	Love Life and Live Green	Gary Arnold
July 18, 2015	On the Road to Freedom	Tom Harkin
July 23, 2016	Inclusion Matters	Kris Lenzo
July 22, 2017	Love is Disability Pride	Karen Tamley, Kevin Irvine, and their daughter Domenika
July 21, 2018	Disability Equality is Long Overdue	Brittany King
July 20, 2019	Disability Pride is Social Justice	Ginger Lane
July 23, 2022	Disability Pride is Back and Stronger than Ever	Alec Cabacungan
July 22, 2023	Disability Pride Will Not Be Denied	Constantine "Gus" Zografopoulos
July 20, 2024	Chicago Disability Pride Parade 20th Anniversary	Genevieve Ramos
July 26, 2025	35 Years of the ADA: Still Rising, Still Thriving!	Rachel Arfa

The Chicago Disability Pride Parade describes the goals of its celebration in its mission statement:

- To change the way people think about and define "disability",
- To break down and end the internalized shame among people with Disabilities; and
- To promote the belief in society that Disability is a natural and beautiful part of human diversity in which people living with Disabilities can take pride.

==== Los Angeles, California ====
A Disability Pride Parade is held annually to celebrate Disability Pride Month in Los Angeles, among other places.

==== New York City, New York ====
On July 26, 1992, New York City held its first Disability Independence Day March. Congress Member Major Owens was a keynote speaker. The last Disability Independence Day March was held on July 28, 1996. New York City began holding Disability Pride Parades annually in 2015 when mayor Bill de Blasio declared July Disability Pride Month. Jazz musician Mike LeDonne's daughter Mary Patterson LeDonne was born in 2004 with multiple disabilities and that was his inspiration for the Annual Disability Pride NYC Parade. He first started putting together ideas for a Disability Pride Parade in New York City in 2011. He formed a nonprofit called Disability Pride NYC, Inc. (DPNYC) in 2014. That same year, the Mayor's Office for People With Disabilities (MOPD) was planning a 25th anniversary of the signing of the Americans with Disabilities Act celebration and decided to join forces with DPNYC to realize the first annual Disability Pride Parade on July 12, 2015. Some seed money for the parade was raised from a Jazz concert called Jazz Legends Play For Disability Pride put on by LeDonne in which many Jazz musicians donated their talent for the night. Almost 4,000 people showed up for the first parade, which culminated with a celebration featuring the talents of the disability community. Tom Harkin and Mary LeDonne (daughter of Mike LeDonne, Founder/President of Disability Pride NYC ) were its grand marshals.

=== Pennsylvania ===
Pennsylvania Governor Josh Shapiro issued a proclamation recognizing Disability Pride Month for July 2025.

==== Philadelphia ====
A Disability Pride Parade is held annually to celebrate Disability Pride Month in Philadelphia, among other places.

==== Pittsburgh ====
A Disability Pride Parade is held annually to celebrate Disability Pride Month in Pittsburgh, among other places.

=== San Antonio, Texas ===
A Disability Pride Parade is held annually to celebrate Disability Pride Month in San Antonio, among other places.

=== San Francisco, California ===
San Francisco mayor London Breed issued a proclamation recognizing Disability Pride Month for July 2020.

A Disability Pride Parade is held annually to celebrate Disability Pride Month in San Francisco, among other places.

=== United Kingdom ===
==== Brighton, England ====
Disability Pride Brighton is an annual event used to promote visibility and mainstream awareness of the positive pride felt by people with disabilities within their community in Brighton, England. Disability Pride Brighton was started in 2016 by Jenny Skelton after her daughter, Charlie, suffered an incident of disability discrimination in Brighton. Jenny posted on Facebook about the incident along with the final line of text "Disability Pride anyone?" The Facebook post went viral and was then picked up by the media. After receiving hundreds of messages from other disabled people who had experienced similar incidents, she decided to proceed with the idea. A year later in 2017 the first Disability Pride Brighton festival was held on New Road in Brighton with an attendance of approximately 2000 people. Held every year since 2017, Disability Pride Brighton is a free event. There are stalls from various charities and disability groups, as well as live performances and art by disabled artists. Due to the limitations of COVID-19 lockdowns, the event moved online in 2020 with a two and a half hour show hosted by Latest TV which also aired on Freeview on July 12, 2020.

== Disability Pride Week ==
Disability Pride Parades also usually coincide with Disability Pride Week in the communities where they are held. Disability Pride Week is an annual event used to promote visibility and mainstream awareness of the positive pride felt by people with disabilities within their community. The ensuing events combine the celebration of disability culture with educational events, such as seminars on legal rights for disabled people, accessibility awareness, and similar topics.

=== New Zealand ===
==== Wellington, New Zealand ====
The first disability pride week in Wellington, New Zealand was held in 2016, and founded by Nick Ruane and Rachel Noble.

The event included art, storytelling, and a defined kaupapa, or set of values. It eventually spread nationwide and is intentionally inclusive of the indigenous Māori people and their culture. The event has been held in September, November, and December.

The New Zealand Disability Pride Week statement says events should explore or demonstrate Disability Pride, have disabled people leading the planning and implementation of the event, acknowledge members of the disability community who have gone, and be fun and inclusive.

== Disability Pride flag ==
A Disability Pride flag redesigned in 2021 by Ann Magill to be visually safe and inclusive.

Disability Pride has a flag created in 2016 by Ann Magill, an American woman with cerebral palsy, and entered into the public domain in 2019. Magill's original flag featured a lightning bolt design and bright colors on a black background. The flag was redesigned in 2021 with muted colors and straight stripes in response to feedback from those with visually triggered disabilities. The new design limits the strobe effect created by the lightning bolt to be more visually safe for those with migraines and visually triggered seizures. The new flag comprises a number of different elements, each symbolising different aspects of the disability experience. The colored stripes are placed diagonally across the flag to show how disabled people have to cut across barriers in society.

- All six "standard" flag colors: disability spans borders between states and nations
- Black field: mourning and rage for victims of ableist violence and abuse
- Diagonal band: "cutting across" the walls and barriers that separate disabled people from society
- Red stripe: physical disabilities
- Gold stripe: cognitive and intellectual disabilities and neurodiversity
- White stripe: invisible and undiagnosed disabilities
- Blue stripe: psychiatric disabilities
- Green stripe: sensory disabilities and sensory processing disabilities, including Deaf, blind, and Deafblind communities

== See also ==
- Disability rights movement
- Disability History Month
- Disability justice
- Disability studies
- Disability flag
- Ableism
- National Disability Employment Awareness Month
- Autistic Pride Day
- Mad Pride
- Neurodiversity Celebration Week
- Neurodiversity
