= Artevalencia =

Artist organization based in Valencia

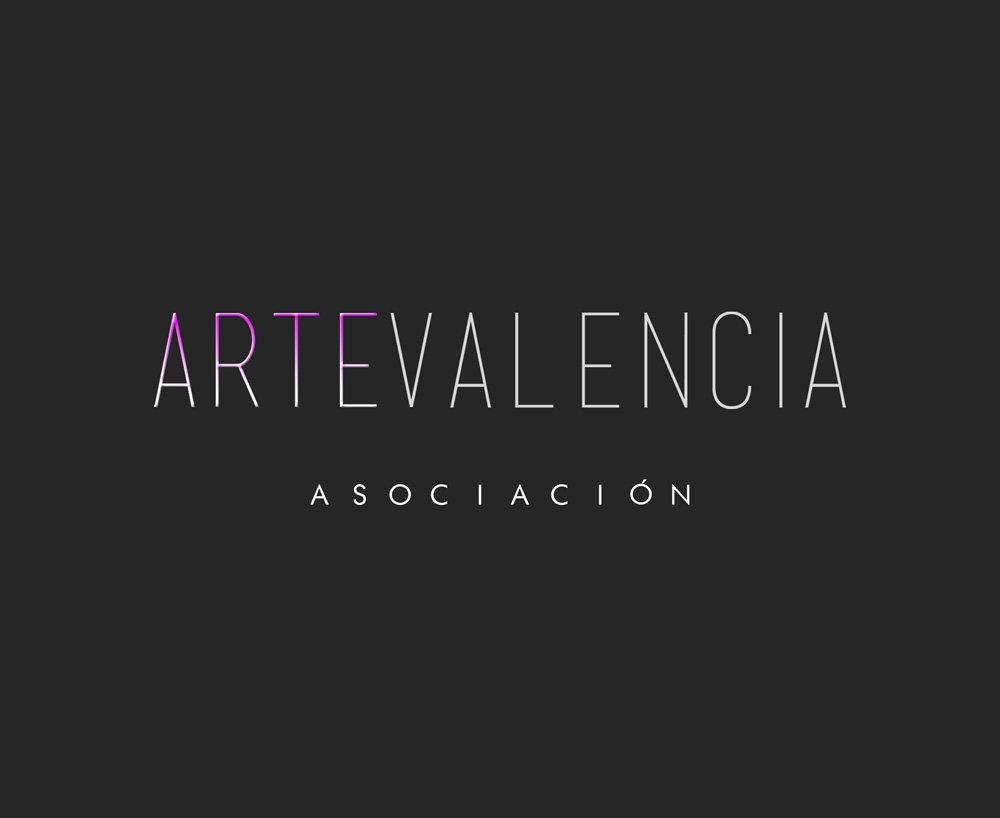
- Founded: 2011
- Type: Association
- Tax ID no.: ESG12904777
- Registration no.: CV-01-050778-CS
- Location: Benicàssim
- Region served: Culture
- Key people: Ismael El Jardinero
- Website: Artevalencia Association

Artevalencia is a non-profit association based in Benicàssim, where different artists, but with the same objective, get together. Searching new means of expression is a constant feature of artists. The association is born with the objective of getting current artists together with new artistic impressions, and support the promotion of their work. In 2013 the association is registered as a volunteering entity, which allows to develop a Cultural Volunteer Program that provides an opportunity to those people with cultural curiosity so that they can join and take part in Artevalencia.

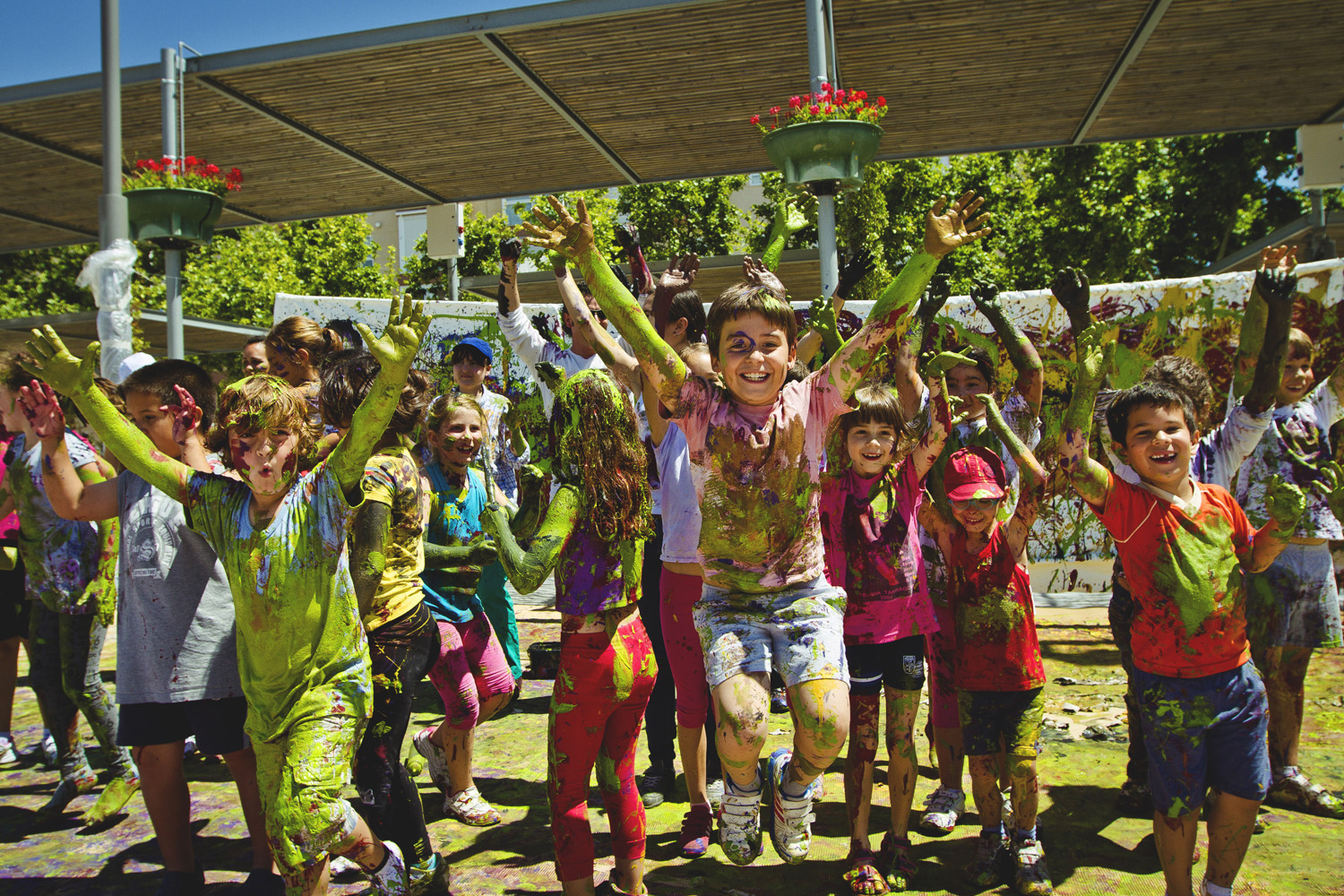
100 Diversidad Artevalencia Benicassim

== Objectives ==
- Organise and perform cultural activities for a higher development and a wider cultural diffusion of the Valencian Community, Spain
- Training through courses and conferences
- Promotion of artists from the Valencian Community
- Integration of people with functional diversity in art
- Promotion of volunteering

== Projects ==
- Exhibition of Contemporary Art - Artevalencia
- 100% Diversity, Art without Barriers

== Links ==
- Artevalencia Association
- Artevalencia Art Show - Benicàssim
