= Disability flag =

Flag representing people with disabilities

Disability pride flag
- Disability flag
- Use: Symbol of the disability community and the disability pride movement
- Adopted: 2021
- Design: A charcoal gray flag bisected diagonally from the top left corner to the lower right corner by five parallel stripes in red, pale gold, pale grey, light blue, and green. Designed to be visually safe and inclusive.
- Designed by: Ann Magill

A disability flag, disability pride flag, or flag of the rights of people with disabilities is a flag that represents people with any disability. The most widely used is the disability pride flag created by American disabled activist Ann Magill. After creating a rainbow lightning bolt design in 2016, Magill received input from people with visually triggering disabilities and changed the design in 2021 to have muted colors and straight diagonal stripes. Another is the gold-silver-bronze disability flag created by Eros Recio from Valencia in 2017, which was aimed mainly to highlight the achievements and value of disabled individuals in society.

== Disability pride flag ==
The disability pride flag represents the Disability Pride Movement. The original disability pride flag was created in 2016 by Ann Magill, an American woman with cerebral palsy, and featured a zig-zag or lightning bolt design. After receiving input from people with visually triggering disabilities, the flag was changed in 2021 to have muted colors and straight diagonal stripes. The concept and design of the Disability Pride Flag were inspired and influenced by social movements such as LGBTQ pride and Black pride.

The flag has been used at various events in the United States, Canada, and Australia. In 2024, a crosswalk in Alberta, Canada was painted with the colors of the flag.

The Disability Pride Flag is a charcoal grey flag bisected diagonally from the top left corner to the lower right corner by five parallel stripes in red, pale gold, pale grey, light blue, and green. The diagonal bands are intended to signify "cutting across barriers that disabled people face." Magill originally assigned each diagonal an individual meaning, before redefining the bands in July 2026 to collectively represent the diversity within the disabled community.

== Gold-silver-bronze disability flag ==
The gold-silver-bronze disability flag was one of the first attempts to unify the community

In addition to the more popular disability flag called the disability pride flag there is the gold-silver-bronze disability flag, designed by Eros Recio from Valencia, which was aimed mainly to highlight the achievements and value of disabled individuals in society. The flag was designed with a metallic color scheme inspired by the medals awarded in sports and competitions, especially the paralympics. The idea behind this design was to emphasize the worthiness, accomplishments, and contributions of disabled people, countering societal narratives that often focused on limitations rather than strengths. On December 3, 2017, during the United Nations' International Day of Persons with Disabilities, parliamentarians from Latin American countries gathered in a plenary assembly in Peru. By acclamation, they declared the flag to be the symbol of all people with disabilities. On the same day, the flag was handed over to the European headquarters of the United Nations. Many Spanish cities and municipalities display the flag on the International Day of People with Disabilities. In 2018, the flag was shown in the city of Santa Cruz de La Palma on the Canary Island of La Palma. On December 3, 2018, the flag was adopted by the "Foment d'Esportistes amb Reptes" (FER), an Olympic and Paralympic sports organization in Spain.

== See also ==
- Disability – Impairments, activity limitations, and participation restrictions
- Disability Pride Month – Observance
- Disability rights movement – Social movement seeking equal rights for disabled people
- Disability Studies – Academic discipline examining the meaning, nature, and consequences of disability
- Disability in the arts
- Functional diversity – Term for handicapped people
- Mad pride – Movement encouraging pride in people with mental illnesses
- People-first language – Putting the person before the diagnosis
