= Disability History Month =

Disability History Month is an annual, month-long observance of the history of the disability rights movement, and commemoration of the achievements of disabled people, that occurs in some places.

== United Kingdom ==
In the United Kingdom, an unofficial Disability History Month is observed by participating individuals and organizations. It was first marked in 2010 and annually scheduled to run from November 22 to December 22.

== United States ==
=== Idaho ===
In 2007, legislation enacted in Idaho designated every October as Disability History Month.

=== Massachusetts ===
Chapter 6 of the Massachusetts General Laws directs that the Governor of Massachusetts "shall annually issue a proclamation setting apart the month of October as Disability History Month to increase awareness and understanding of the contributions made by persons with disabilities".

=== Missouri ===
In May 2011, the Missouri legislature passed House Bill 555, which authorizes school boards to require the provision of disability history and awareness instruction in public schools during the month of October of each year. House Bill 555 further designated the month of October to be "Disability History and Awareness Month".

=== Washington ===
In the state of Washington, October is a statutorily designated civic holiday called Disability History Month. The bill establishing the holiday passed the state legislature in 2008 and is codified in Title 28A of the Revised Code of Washington in 2008. In addition to the ceremonial designation, the law also requires that "each public school shall conduct or promote educational activities that provide instruction, awareness, and understanding of disability history and people with disabilities".

=== Similar observances ===
The U.S. Congress has statutorily designated the month of October as a recurring, civic holiday called "National Disability Employment Awareness Month".

The 82nd Texas Legislature statutorily designated October as a recurring, month-long civic holiday called "Persons with Disabilities History and Awareness Month" to "encourage public schools and state agencies to celebrate the accomplishments of people with disabilities, highlighting the achievements of Texans with disabilities who made significant contributions to the state and the extraordinary Americans who led the way in the disability rights movement".

Meanwhile Delaware, in 2011, designated October as "Disability History and Awareness Month".

== See also ==
- Disability Pride Week
- Disability Pride Month
