= United Nations' International Day of Persons with Disabilities =

Internationally recognized day on 3 December

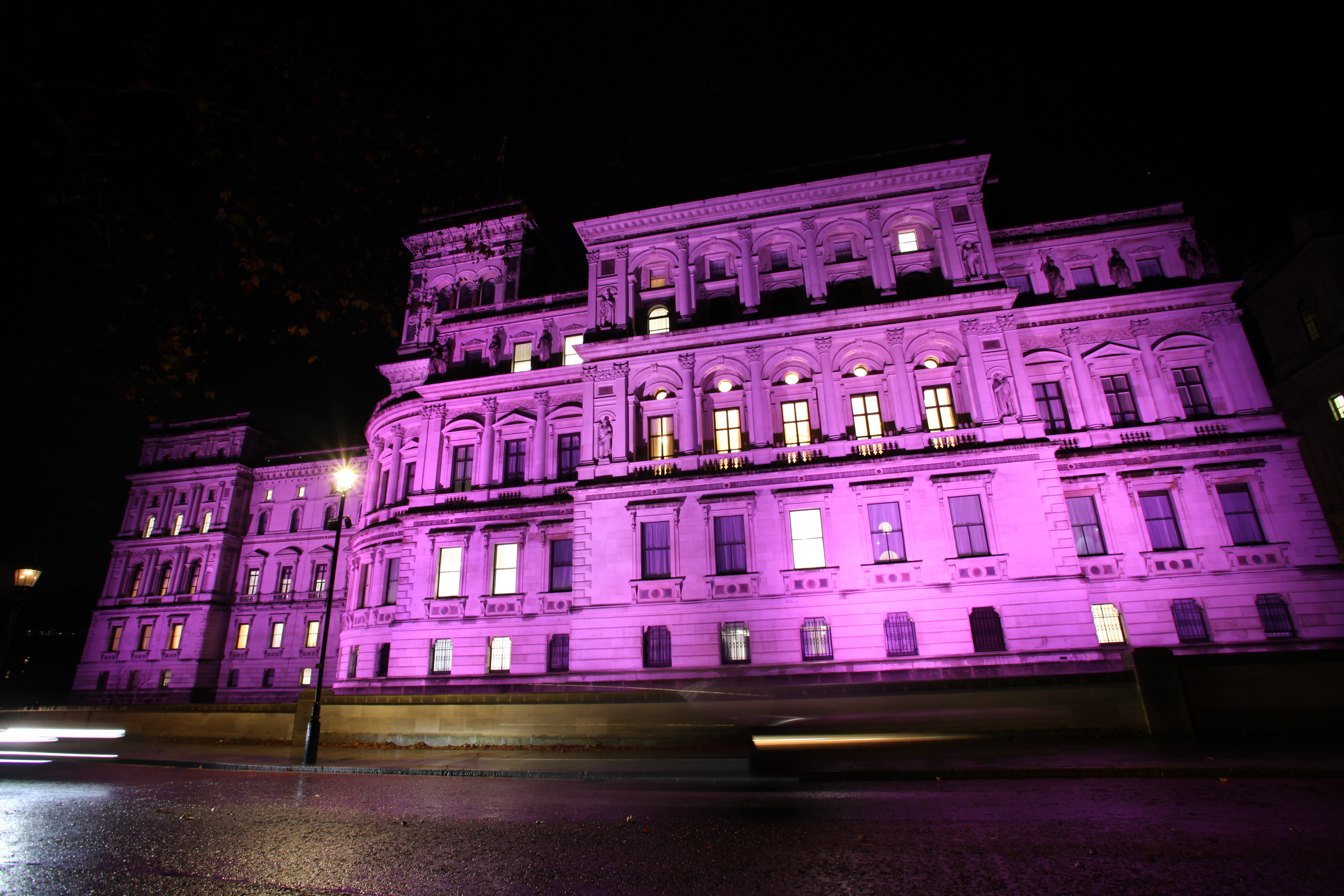
The Foreign, Commonwealth and Development Office in London lit up in purple to mark 2020 International Day of Persons with Disabilities

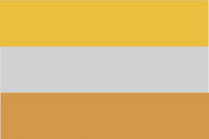
The Gold-Silver-Bronze flag declared on this day in 2017 as a symbol of all people with disabilities.

International Day of Persons with Disabilities (3 December) is an international observance promoted by the United Nations since 1992. It has been observed with varying degrees of success around the planet. The observance of the Day aims to promote an understanding of disability issues and mobilize support for the dignity, rights and well-being of persons with disabilities. It also seeks to increase awareness of gains to be derived from the integration of persons with disabilities in every aspect of political, social, economic and cultural life. It was originally called "International Day of Disabled Persons" until 2007. Each year the day focuses on a different issue.

== History ==
=== International Year of Disabled Persons 1981 ===
In 1976, the United Nations General Assembly proclaimed 1981 as the International Year of Disabled Persons. It called for a plan of action at the National, regional and International levels, with an emphasis on equalization of opportunities, rehabilitation and prevention of disabilities.

The theme of the International Year of Disabled Persons was "Full Participation and Equality", defined as the right of persons with disabilities to take part fully in the life and development of their societies, enjoy living conditions equal to those of other citizens, and have an equal share in improved conditions resulting from socio-economic development.

=== United Nations Decade of Disabled Persons 1983–1992 ===
To provide a time frame during which Governments and Organizations could implement the activities recommended in the World Programme of Action, the General Assembly proclaimed 1983–1992 the United Nations Decade of Disabled Persons.

=== Flag ===
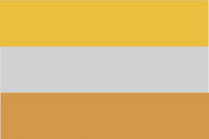
The Gold-Silver-Bronze flag declared on this day in 2017 as a symbol of all people with disabilities.

On December 3, 2017, during the International Day of Persons with Disabilities, parliamentarians from Latin American countries gathered in a plenary assembly in Peru. By acclamation, they declared the Gold-Silver-Bronze flag to be the symbol of all people with disabilities. On the same day, the flag was handed over to the European headquarters of the United Nations. Many Spanish cities and municipalities display the flag on the International Day of People with Disabilities. In 2018, the flag was shown in the city of Santa Cruz de La Palma on the Canary Island of La Palma. On December 3, 2018, the flag was adopted by the "Foment d'Esportistes amb Reptes" (FER), an Olympic and Paralympic sports organization in Spain.

=== Themes from previous years ===
- 1998: "Arts, Culture and Independent Living"
- 1999: "Accessibility for all for the new Millennium"
- 2000: "Making information technologies work for all"
- 2001: "Full participation and equality: The call for new approaches to assess progress and evaluate outcome"
- 2002: "Independent Living and Sustainable Livelihoods"
- 2003: "A Voice of our Own"
- 2004: "Nothing About Us Without Us"
- 2005: "Rights of Persons with Disabilities: Action in Development"
- 2006: "E-Accessibility"
- 2007: "Decent Work for Persons with Disabilities"
- 2008: "Convention on the Rights of Persons with Disabilities: Dignity and justice for all of us"
- 2009: "Making the MDGs Inclusive: Empowerment of persons with disabilities and their communities around the world"
- 2010: "Keeping the promise: Mainstreaming disability in the Millennium Development Goals towards 2015 and beyond"
- 2011: "Together for a better world for all: Including persons with disabilities in development"
- 2012: "Removing barriers to create an inclusive and accessible society for all"
- 2013: "Break Barriers, Open Doors: for an inclusive society and development for all"
- 2014: "Sustainable development: The promise of technology"
- 2015: "Inclusion matters: access and empowerment for people of all abilities"
- 2016: "Achieving 17 Goals for the future we want"
- 2017: "Transformation toward sustainable and resilient society for all"
- 2018: "Empowering persons with disabilities and ensuring inclusiveness and equality"
- 2019: "Promoting the participation of persons with disabilities and their leadership: taking action on the 2030 Development Agenda"
- 2020: "Building Back Better: toward a disability-inclusive, accessible and sustainable post COVID-19 world"
- 2021: "Leadership and participation of persons with disabilities toward an inclusive, accessible and sustainable post-COVID-19 world"
- 2022: "Transformative solutions for inclusive development: the role of innovation in fuelling an accessible and equitable world"
- 2023: "United in action to rescue and archive the SDGs for, with and by person with disabilities"
- 2024: "Amplifying the leadership of persons with disabilities for an inclusive and sustainable future"
- 2025: "Health financing matters"

On the 2012 International Day of People with Disability, the United Kingdom government introduced mandatory work for disabled people who received welfare benefits in order to "Improve disabled peoples chances of getting work by mandatory employment". The founder of the Susan Archibald Centre stated that the mandatory employment of people with disabilities is a breach of article 27/2 of the UN Convention of the Rights of Persons with Disabilities. The Guardian noted that from this United Nations appointed day onwards people with disabilities and illnesses ranging from cancer to paralysis to mental health may be forced by the UK government to work for free or else they risk being stripped of up to 70% of their welfare benefits. A program was also launched on 3 December in India to serve the "differently-able" community of the country as an initiative called Accessible India Campaign under Article 9 of the UN Convention on the Rights of Persons with Disabilities (UNCRPD).

== See also ==
- Convention on the Rights of Persons with Disabilities
- Disability flag
- Disability rights movement
- Infinite Ability
- International Year of Disabled Persons 1981
- World Autism Awareness Day
