= Accessible India Campaign =

2015 accessibility initiative in India

- Sugamya Bharat Abhiyan
- Motto: Accessible India – Empowered India
- Country: India
- Prime Minister(s): Narendra Modi
- Launched: 3 December 2015; 10 years ago
- Status: Active
- Website: accessibleindia.gov.in

Accessible India Campaign or Sugamya Bharat Abhiyan is a program which is set to be launched to serve the disabled community of the country. The program comes with an index to measure the design of disabled-friendly buildings and human resource policies. The flagship program has been launched by the Prime Minister on 3 December 2015, the International Day of people with Disabilities. The initiative also in line with the Article 9 of the (UN Convention on the Rights of Persons with Disabilities) to which India is a signatory since 2007. The scheme also comes under Persons with Disabilities Act, 1995 under section 44, 45, 46 for equal Opportunities and protection of rights which provides non-discrimination in Transport to Persons with Disabilities.

== Targets ==
According to the 2011 Census of India, 2.21 per cent of the population or approximately 26.8 million Indians have a disability. The target is to make at least fifty percent government buildings accessible to disabled people under the campaign in each of the state capital and central capital till end of May 2018 and make 25 per cent of the public transport vehicles under government as disabled friendly until mid-2017. It also envisages further development with bigger targets in the following years. In this way, the overall environment becomes more inclusive and provides equal opportunities to the Pwd. A website will also be made where the people can put their views on the accessibility of any building. By July 2016, the international airports in the country and railway stations which come under A1, A and B categories will be made fully disabled-friendly.

Special set-top boxes will be made available to make watching TV more convenient for the visually impaired. In the next 5 years, almost 200 people will be trained to speak in sign languages on government TV channels. Government websites will also be made more friendly by using text to speech option. The initiative involves retrofitting buildings, framing such standards for new buildings and transport that they are friendly to disabled people, auditing private companies on 'accessibility index' standard and making all government websites friendly to disabled people.

A Sugamya Bharat mobile app which can provide information on disabled-friendly public facilities in a city, will be launched under the scheme. On 9 November 2017, RBI asked the banks to provide doorstep banking facilities to senior citizens of more than 70 years of age and disabled people including the visually-impaired.

After it was found that targets under the Accessible India Campaign had been missed by 1–3 years, the government had set March 2020 as the new deadline for completing all the work under this initiative.

== Rating ==
There will a collection of 10 private companies from different sectors including textiles and manufacturing which will be included in the ratings. The parameters will include investment in the training of the differently able employees and their career growth and the quality of facilities provided to them. The range of rating is 1 to 10. The structure of the points allotment and data management has been estimated by the department of disability affairs which comes under the ministry of social justice and empowerment. The government sees this campaign as an ethical push with the help of the index for the corporate sector under the Corporate social responsibility (CSR) and incentives will be given according to their performance.

== Other features ==
The ministry of social justice and empowerment will give free motorized tricycles to people with 70-90% disability. Each state has to choose at least 50-100 public buildings which are friendly to people with disabilities. Till 2016, the program aims to make public buildings in 50 cities of the country under the prescribed guidelines. However, due to slow progress, revised deadlines had been extended to March 2020.

For awareness, a team of experts will conduct workshops for sensitizing the main parties including builders and activists.

The government will establish a special university for disabled people with a corpus of ₹1,700 crore (US$180 million) which will start functioning from the next academic year with special courses.

== Works done ==
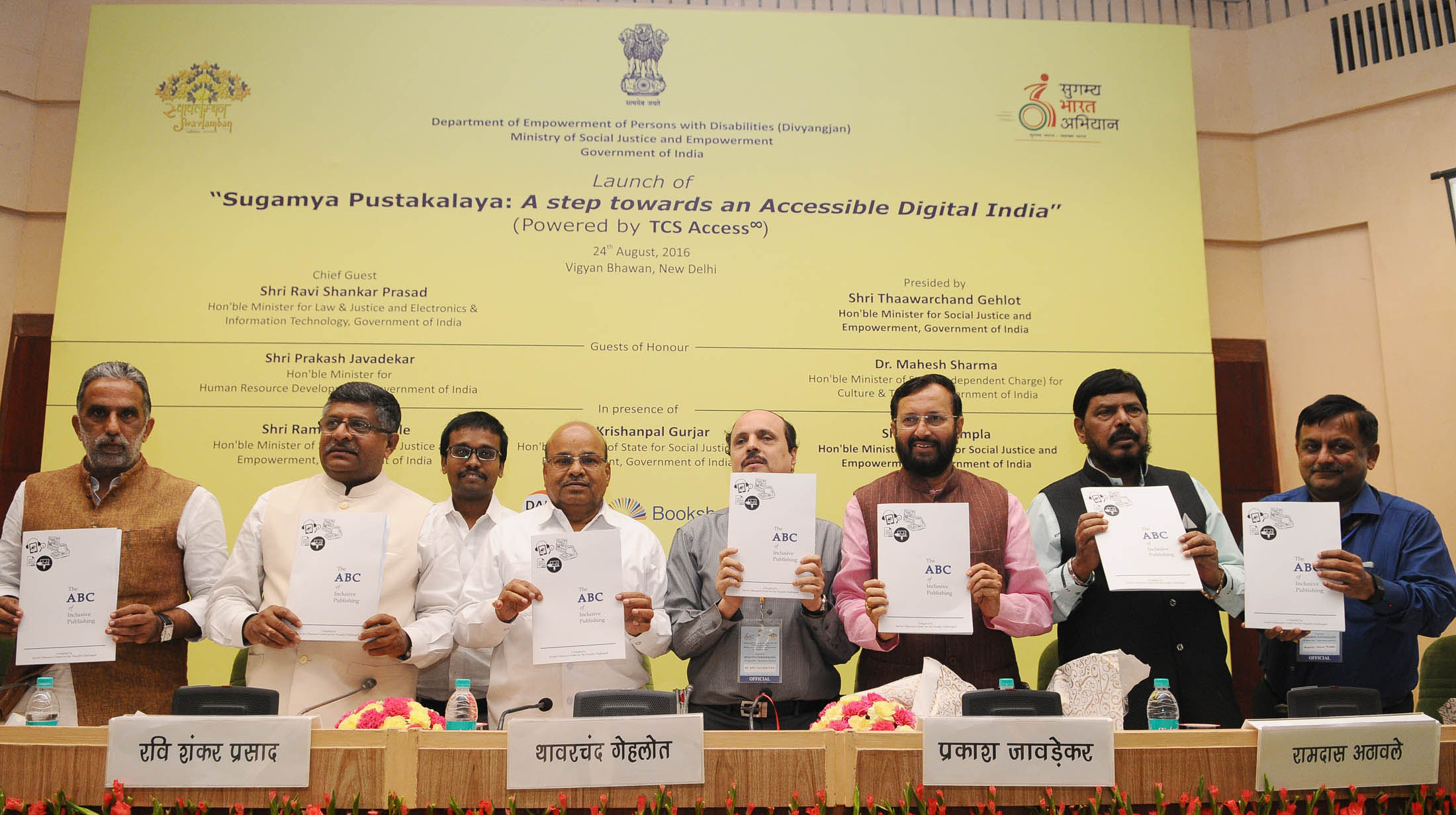
Dignitaries at the launch of the Sugamya Pustakalaya (Accessible Library) in 2016

In August 2016, an online library Sugamya Pustakalaya (Accessible Library) was launched under the scheme by the Department of Empowerment of Persons with Disabilities (DEPwD) in collaboration with National Institute of Visually Handicapped, member organizations of Daisy Forum of India, Bookshare and TCS Access. The library would be a collection of all accessible materials from all over the country and the organizations who would become members of it would provide accessible material to its members.

As of August 2016, 400 out of nearly 1800 websites of the Government of India were made accessible.
