= Neurodiversity Celebration Week =

Global awareness initiative

- Founded: 2018
- Founder: Siena Castellon
- Purpose: Education & Workplace
- Location: United Kingdom
- Website: neurodiversityweek.com

Neurodiversity Celebration Week is a worldwide initiative that challenges stereotypes and misconceptions about neurodevelopmental disorders and learning disabilities. The week has historically been observed in mid-to-late March and spanned between 5 and 7 days.

The initiative began with two aims. The first, to encourage schools to recognise the strengths and talents of neurodivergent students who think and learn differently, including students who are autistic, dyslexic, dyspraxic, or who have ADHD. The second aim, to address the lack of training classroom teachers have in identifying and supporting their students with special educational needs by providing them with free resources.

Since partnering with psychological consultancy Lexxic, the campaign now sees over 3,100 schools, 1,200 6th forms and colleges, 4,300 organisations, and 7,000 others from over 139 countries participating in Neurodiversity Celebration Week through themed events, guest speakers and raising awareness. Organisations in support include The London Stock Exchange Group, The U.K. Ministry of Defence, Deloitte, Savills, and AstraZeneca. The U.K. Royal Navy created a video in which Second Sea Lord Vice Admiral Nick Hine discussed how being autistic has benefitted him in his naval career.

== History ==
Neurodiversity Celebration Week was started in 2018 by Siena Castellon when she was 16 years old. As an autistic student, who also has dyslexia, dyspraxia and ADHD, she experienced significant challenges, prejudice and bullying throughout her education. Her negative educational experiences motivated her to launch Neurodiversity Celebration Week in 2018 to challenge the misconceptions and stereotypes that still prevent autistic people and people with learning disabilities from reaching their potential.

Neurodiversity Celebration Week has been mentioned by ITV News, a Carmen Sandiego series 'Fearless Kids Around the World', the BBC, The New Scientist, The Guardian, and Forbes. In 2020, Siena Castellon was selected out of over 7,000 global applicants by the United Nations to be a Young Leader for the Sustainable Development Goals (SDGs), a two-year role that allowed her to promote her neurodiversity advocacy work and Neurodiversity Celebration Week.

=== Past and scheduled observances ===
- March 15-19, 2027
- March 16-20, 2026
- March 17-23, 2025
- March 18-24, 2024
- March 13-19, 2023
- March 21-27, 2022
