= National Disability Employment Awareness Month =

US awareness month

National Disability Employment Awareness Month was declared in 1988 by the United States Congress for the month of October to raise awareness of the employment needs and contributions of individuals with all types of disabilities. The month is an extension of "National Employ the Physically Handicapped Week" originally observed during the first week of October beginning in 1945. In 1962 the word "physically" was removed from that week to acknowledge the employment needs and contributions of individuals with all types of disabilities. Americans observe National Disability Employment Awareness Month by paying tribute to the accomplishments of the people with disabilities whose work helps keep the nation's economy strong and by reaffirming their commitment to ensure equal opportunity for all citizens.

== Origin ==
In 1945, the US government pushed to educate the public about issues relating to disabilities and employment. That year Congress enacted Public Law 176, which declared the first week of October, every year, as National Employ the Physically Handicapped Week. In 1962, the word "physically" was removed to acknowledge the employment needs and contributions of individuals with all types of disabilities. Congress later expanded the first week of October to the entire month of October and changed the name to National Disability Employment Awareness Month in 1988.

== History ==
The Rehabilitation Act of 1973 prohibits any public institutions that receive federal funds from discriminating on the premise of disability. Only two years later in 1975, the Education for All Handicapped Children Act was passed requiring public schools that accept federal funding to provide equal education and access to education for disabled children. Years later in 1990, President Bush signed the Americans with Disabilities Act (ADA) guaranteeing access to and prohibits discrimination against individuals with physical or mental disabilities. In 2000, President Clinton signed an Executive Order, requesting for the federal government to hire 100,000 people with disabilities over the next five years. The final major event that happened is when Congress created the Office of Disability Employment Policy within the Department of Labor.

== Initiatives ==
Under the United States Department of Labor is an Office of Disability Employment Policy. This office has created the Disability Employment Initiative (DEI) which aims to improve education, training and employment opportunities and outcomes for youth and adults with disabilities who are unemployed, underemployed and/or receiving Social Security disability benefits. Through the DEI, there are 70 Disability Resource Coordinators. Along with State Project Leads, they serve to strengthen the capacity of American Job Centers in hopes of increasing employment opportunities for people with disabilities.

=== Georgia ===
- Funding a full-time counselor dedicated to maximizing positive outcomes for disabled job seekers and in the workforce.

=== California ===
- Partnering with local trainers for trucking driving to assist people with disabilities and employers within an internship.

=== Massachusetts ===
- Partnering with some local healthcare facility along with some community colleges to help with people with disabilities acquire skills with hopes of eventually helping them with job employment.

=== Connecticut ===
- Creating job fairs in order to create connections between businesses and people with disabilities hoping to result in job seekers with disabilities gaining a job.

=== Iowa ===
- Career fairs in which the job seeker is behind the table promoting their own employment ambition showcasing their skills to potential employers.

=== California ===
- Partnership Plus agreement ensure that various American Job Centers are able to provide full services for Vocational Rehabilitation clients.

=== New York ===
- "Ticket Holders," which are people who "provide employment support services to beneficiaries," are taught to acknowledge their fears and loss of benefits.

== Figures ==
With 62.7% of non-institutionalized persons 16 and older in the workforce, only 19.5% of which have disabilities.

== See also ==
- Disability History Month
- Disability
