= Functional diversity (disability) =

Term for handicapped people

Functional diversity is a politically and socially correct term for special needs, disability, impairment and handicap, which began to be used in Spain in scientific writing, at the initiative of those directly affected, in 2005.

== Usage ==
This term is intended to replace other ones with pejorative semantics. It proposes a shift towards non-negative, non-disparaging and non-patronizing terms. The formal justification of the term can be found in the book El Modelo de la Diversidad by Agustina Palacios and Javier Romañach, 2007, ISBN 978-84-96474-40-6. Examples of usage:

- "people with functional diversity" instead of "people with special needs"
- "physical functional diversity"
- "mobility functional diversity", "person who uses a wheelchair", "wheelchair user"
- "motor functional diversity"
- "dexterity functional diversity"
- "visual functional diversity", "people who use screen readers as their primary means of accessing a computer"
- "people with a visual processing functional diversity"
- "auditory functional diversity"
- "mental functional diversity"
- "intellectual functional diversity"
- "cognitive functional diversity"
- "organic functional diversity"
- "circumstantial and/or temporary functional diversity"
- "person with a functional diversity"
- "persons without functional diversity" rather than "normal" or "healthy"
- "people without functional diversity", "typically developing children"

== See also ==
- Disability flag
- Diversity (politics)
- Neurodiversity
