= Pedestrian crossings in the United Kingdom =

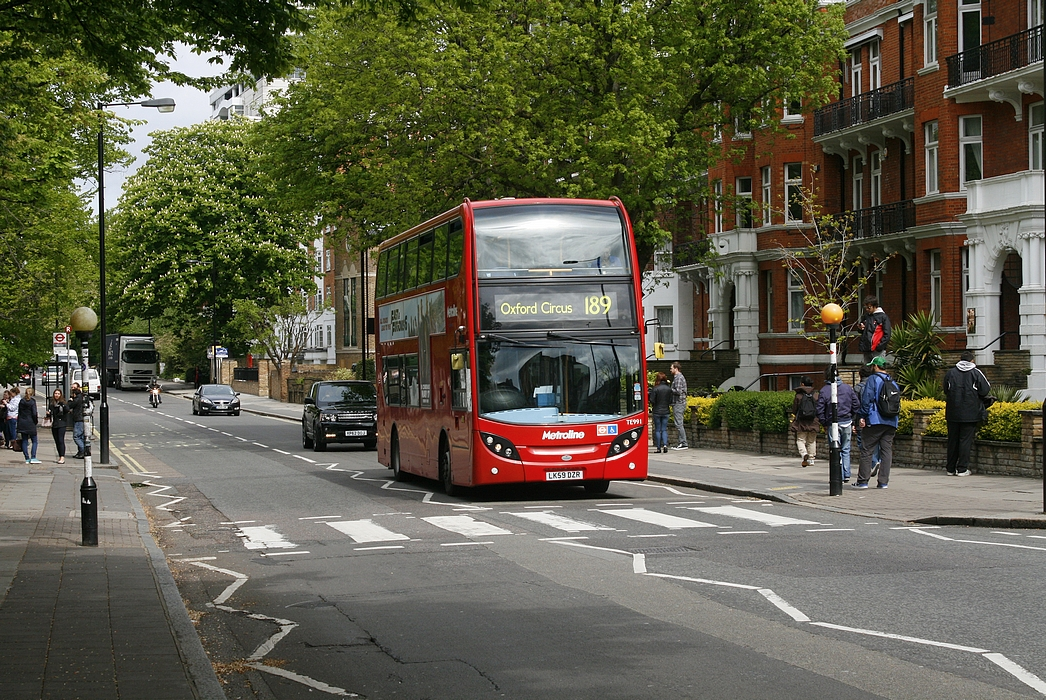
Zebra crossing on Abbey Road, London, which features on the cover of the Beatles album Abbey Road

The United Kingdom has specific types of pedestrian crossing.

== History ==
The first pedestrian crossing signal was erected in Bridge Street, Westminster, London, in December 1868. It was the idea of John Peake Knight, a railway engineer, who thought that it would provide a means to safely allow pedestrians to cross this busy thoroughfare. The signal consisted of a semaphore arm (manufactured by Saxby and Farmer, who were railway signaling makers), which was raised and lowered manually by a police constable who would rotate a handle on the side of the pole. The semaphore arms were augmented by gas illuminated lights at the top (green and red) to increase visibility of the signal at night. However, in January 1869, the gas used to illuminate the lights at the top leaked and caused an explosion, injuring the police operator. No further work was done on signalled pedestrian crossings until fifty years later.

In the early 20th century, car traffic increased dramatically. A reader of The Times wrote to the editor in 1911:

"Could you do something to help the pedestrian to recover the old margin of safety on our common streets and roads? It is heartrending to read of the fearful deaths taking place. If a pedestrian now has even one hesitation or failure the chance of escape from a dreadful death is now much less than when all vehicles were much slower. There is, too, in the motor traffic an evident desire not to slow down before the last moment. It is surely a scandal that on the common ways there should be undue apprehension in the minds of the weakest users of them. While the streets and roads are for all, of necessity the pedestrians, and the feeblest of these, should receive the supreme consideration."

== Types ==
=== Informal crossings ===
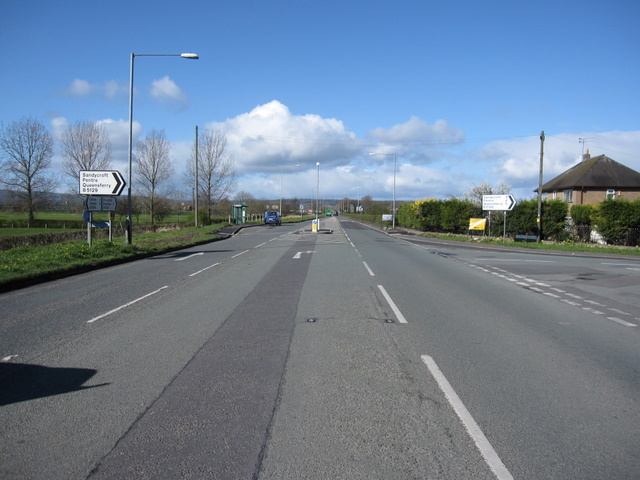
Pedestrian refuges can be incorporated into priority junctions, like this one in Saltney

Pedestrian refuges are uncontrolled crossings with two dropped kerbs and a central traffic island, protected by kerbs. The island allows pedestrians to cross the road one direction of traffic at a time, which can be quicker and safer (they decrease pedestrian accidents by around 40%) than a lack of crossing. Additionally, they can narrow the road (refuges slow vehicle speeds by 6%) and prevent vehicles overtaking (as vehicles must normally pass the island on the left on a two-way road). However, they do not afford pedestrians priority unless they are located at a junction, meaning pedestrians may have a longer wait than a controlled crossing. They can also create pinch points, which can be dangerous for cyclists.

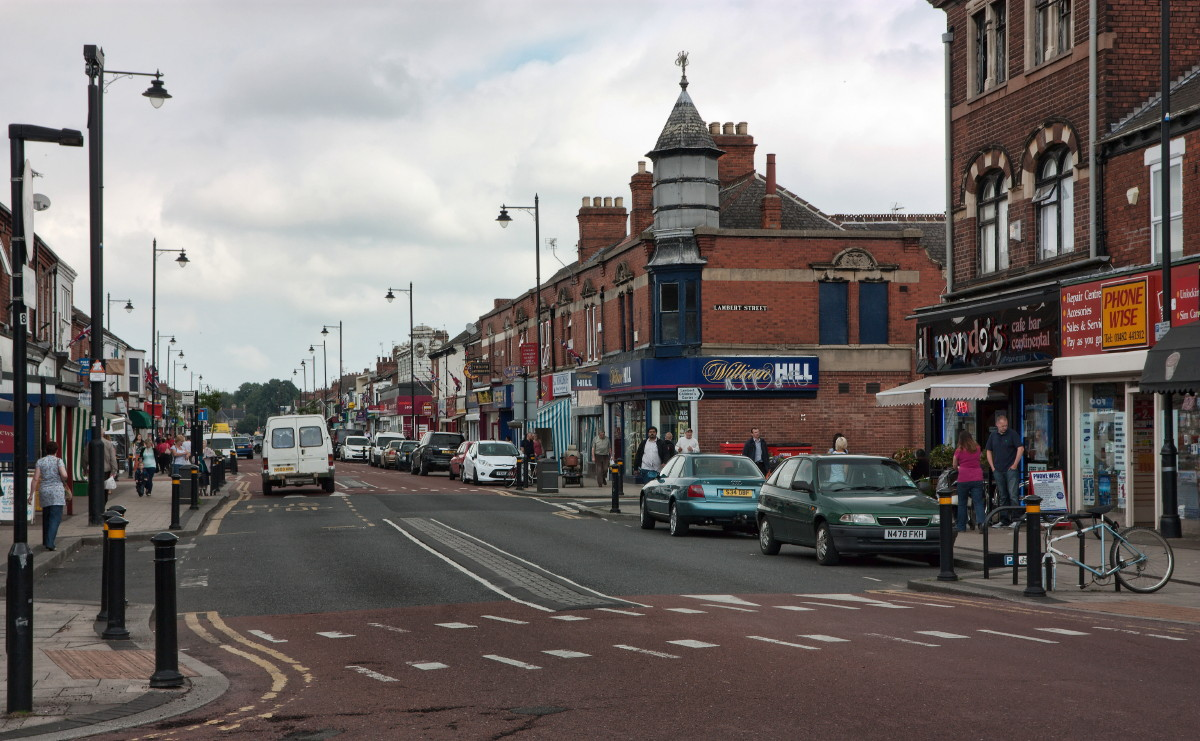
Courtesy crossings on Newland Avenue, Hull

Courtesy crossings are uncontrolled crossings with coloured surfacing or some other non-formal suggestion that pedestrians may cross. They aim to encourage concentrated pedestrian crossings and to encourage drivers to let pedestrians cross the roads out of courtesy, rather than obligation (unless at a junction). The inclusion of stripes (e.g. in paving), the presence of narrowing and visual narrowings of the road positively affect courtesy.

Since 29 January 2022 pedestrians crossing the mouth of a side road have priority over vehicles turning in from the main road.

=== Zebra crossings ===
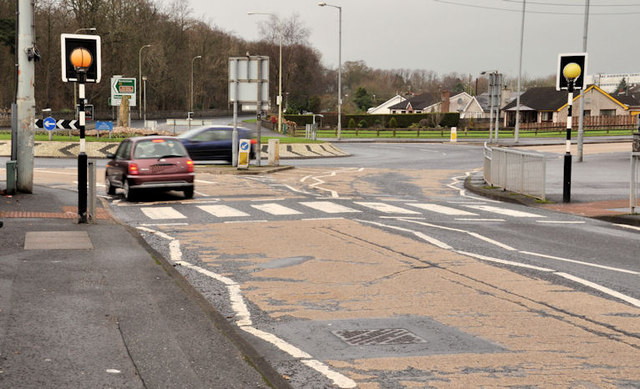
A zebra crossing in Antrim

Zebra crossings are a type of controlled crossing indicated by white longitudinal bars across the carriageway and upright flashing globes, known as Belisha beacons. Zebra crossings can be used on roads where the 85th percentile speed is not above 35mph. The minimum width for a crossing is 2.4 m.

At a zebra crossing, pedestrians should wait for traffic from both directions to stop before moving onto the crossing. Drivers are legally required to give way when someone is crossing the road at a zebra crossing, and are expected to give way to someone waiting to cross at a zebra crossing.

=== Signal-controlled crossings ===
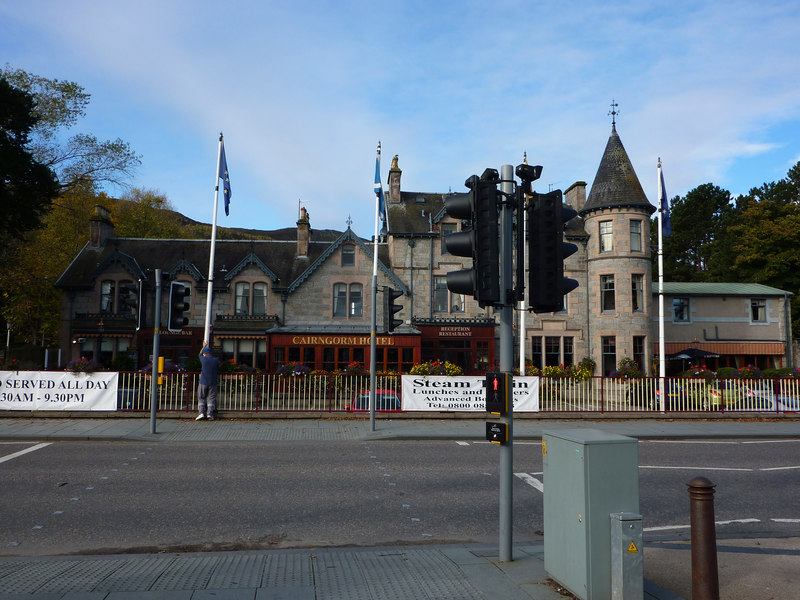
A puffin crossing with nearside signals in Aviemore

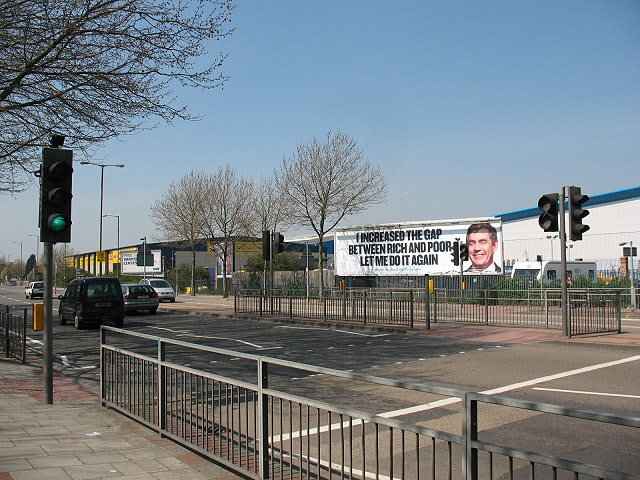
A staggered set of pelican crossings with farside signals in Greenwich

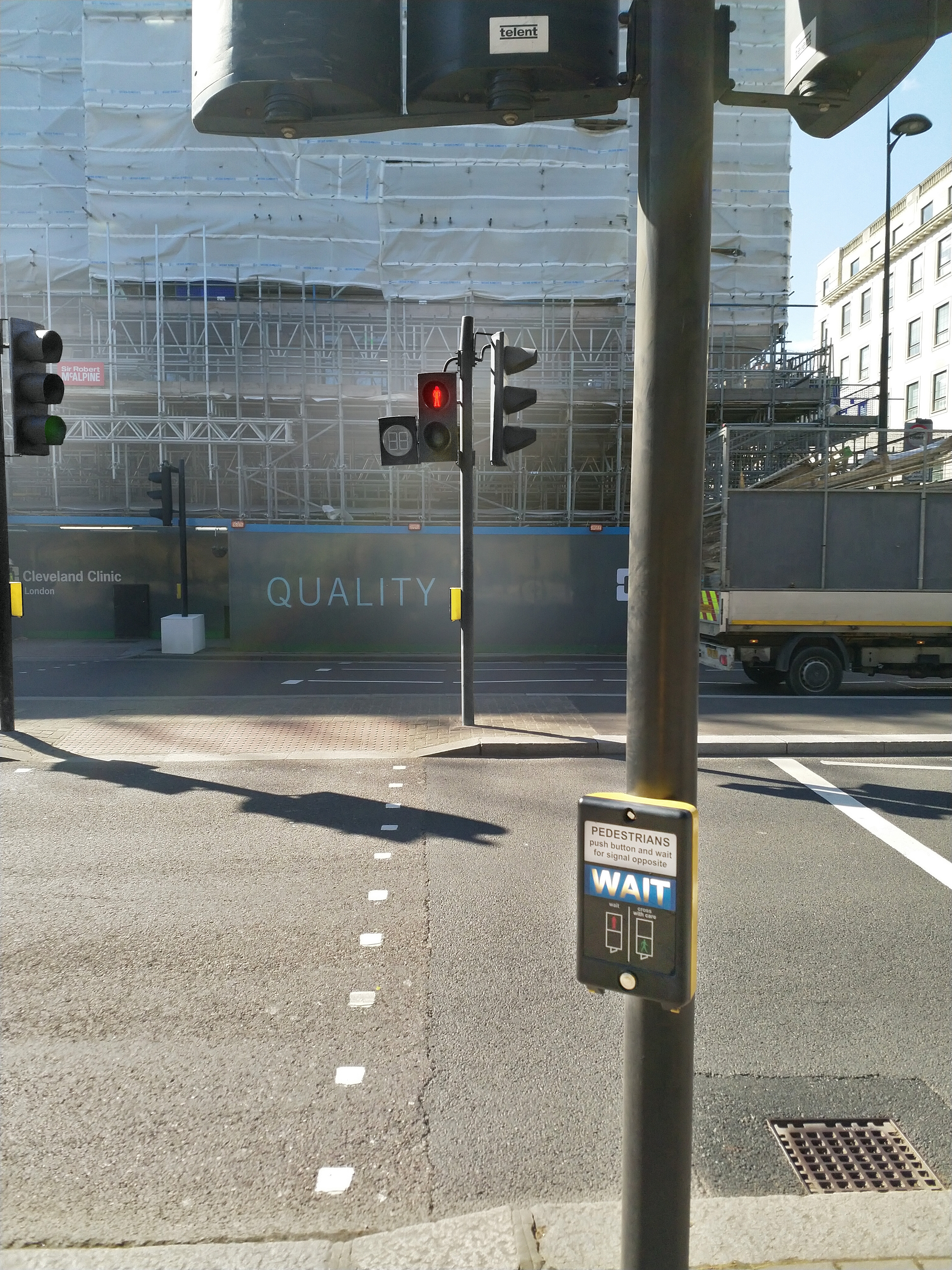
Pedex crossing in London. A countdown timer is used in place of the flashing green man on a pelican crossing.

Pelican crossings, puffin crossings and pedex crossings are all types of controlled crossing controlled by traffic signals for pedestrians and drivers. These types of crossings can be used where vehicle speeds are high, where there are a lot of vulnerable pedestrians, where vehicle flows or pedestrian flows are high or where the road layout could cause uncertainty.

At these crossings, there will be at least two signal heads facing each direction of vehicular traffic, as well as signal heads and call buttons for pedestrians. The crossings can be staggered to shorten crossing times, mainly for the benefit of vehicular traffic flow.

While pelican crossings are no longer permitted to be installed in Great Britain (they are in Northern Ireland), pedex crossings allow the continued use of farside pedestrian signals.

=== Defunct crossing types ===
Defunct crossings include:

- panda crossings

== Pedestrian signals ==
There are two common types of pedestrian signal in the UK: nearside and farside. Nearside signals are incorporated into the push button, while farside signals are located at the other end of the crossing, facing the pedestrian across the road. Both types are permitted, and highway authorities can install either as they wish, though not both at the same installation.

Nearside signal units will normally be one unit, however a repeater unit may be provided higher up where there are lots of pedestrians, as nearside signals can be more easily blocked.

Farside signal heads will normally contain two signals: a red man and a green man signal. Furthermore, on the nearside there will be a push button unit, which normally contains the text "PEDESTRIANS push button and wait for signal opposite" as well as a pictorial guide to the crossing symbols.

== Markings ==
=== Look right, look left ===
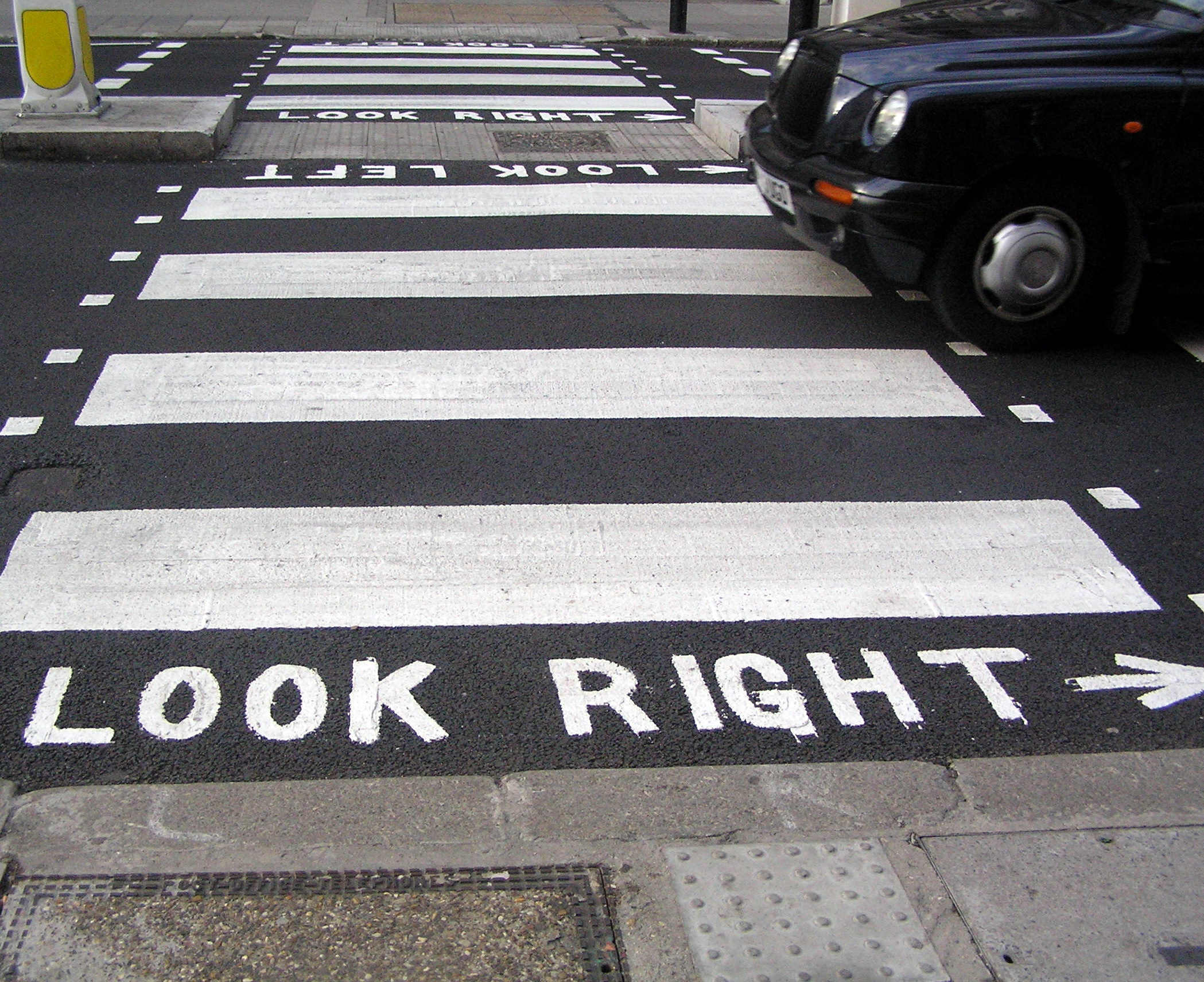
Look right / Look left markings at a zebra crossing

Road markings with the text "Look right" and "Look left" are sometimes used at pedestrian crossings to indicate to pedestrians the direction from which traffic will approach. Common uses may be a pedestrian island on a one way street or where a contraflow bus lane is in use. At times these markings have been painted incorrectly, which can create confusing situations for pedestrians. For example, on a street in Islington, the words "look right" were painted, although the accompanying arrow pointed left and traffic approached from the left.

== Installation cost ==
Average installation costs are as follows. Note that the costs are based on no existing crossing, it will cost less in other cases (e.g. upgrading a puffin to a toucan).

Type	Average cost range	Notes
Informal crossing (pedestrian refuge)	£5,000-£10,000	
Zebra/parallel crossing	£15,000-£27,000	Requires a Traffic Regulation Order.
Puffin/toucan crossing	£30,000-£50,000	Requires a Traffic Regulation Order.

== The use of crossings by non-pedestrians ==
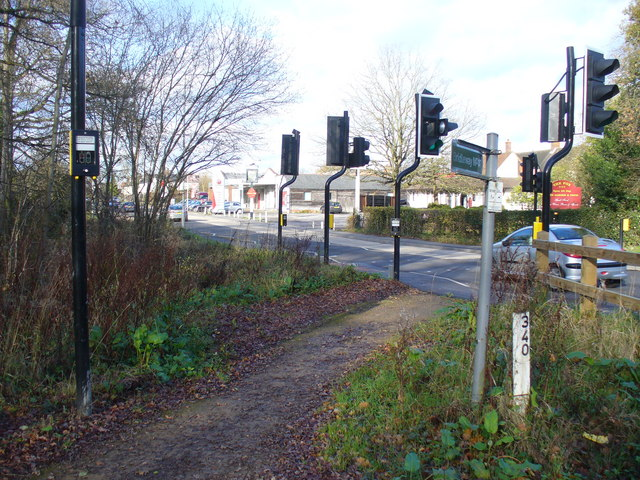
An equestrian crossing in Bisley

There are situations where other users may need to cross the road alongside pedestrians, in which case it may be practicable to use a multi-user crossing.

Parallel crossings are formed by placing a cycle track next to the bars in the zebra crossing, and allow cyclists to ride across the crossing, which they are not normally permitted to do. Toucan crossings are a type of controlled, signalised crossing which can be used simultaneously by pedestrians and cyclists, as cyclists cannot use the signal-controlled pedestrian crossings. Toucan crossings generally should not be staggered. Finally, a parallel crossing can be signalised by placing cycle track(s) in parallel to a puffin or pedex crossing. This is known as a sparrow crossing.

Equestrian crossings can be used by horse riders. They can be sited in parallel to toucan and pedestrian facilities.

== For disabled pedestrians ==
All new and updated crossings in the UK, including informal crossings must not disable people. They do this is a number of different ways.

Dropped kerb: A ramp should be provided to assist pedestrians to cross the road, as some people, especially wheelchair users, find it difficult to negotiate kerbs. Therefore, a 'dropped kerb', where the kerb is flush with the carriageway, or a raised crossing is normally provided.

Tactile blister paving: Blister paving is always used at controlled and uncontrolled crossings. This is coloured red at controlled crossings (zebras, puffins, signalised junctions) and any other colour which contrasts from the footway surface at uncontrolled crossings.

The guidance recommends that pedestrian push buttons be located on the right side of the crossing waiting area. This is because visually impaired people are taught to look for a push button to their right.
