= X-way crossing =

X-way crossing may refer to one of two types of pedestrian crossing:

- Pedestrian scramble, a crossing which allows pedestrians to cross an intersection in every direction
- X-way crossing (1960s), an early and short-lived predecessor of the Pelican crossing
