= Toucan crossing =

Combined pedestrian and bicycle crossing

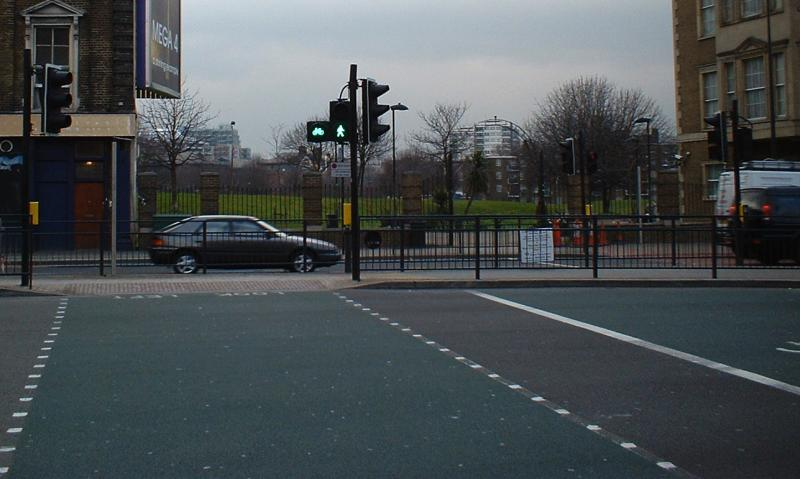
Older-style toucan crossing (seen in Vauxhall, London, in 2004) with signal lights on the opposite side, like those of a pelican crossing.

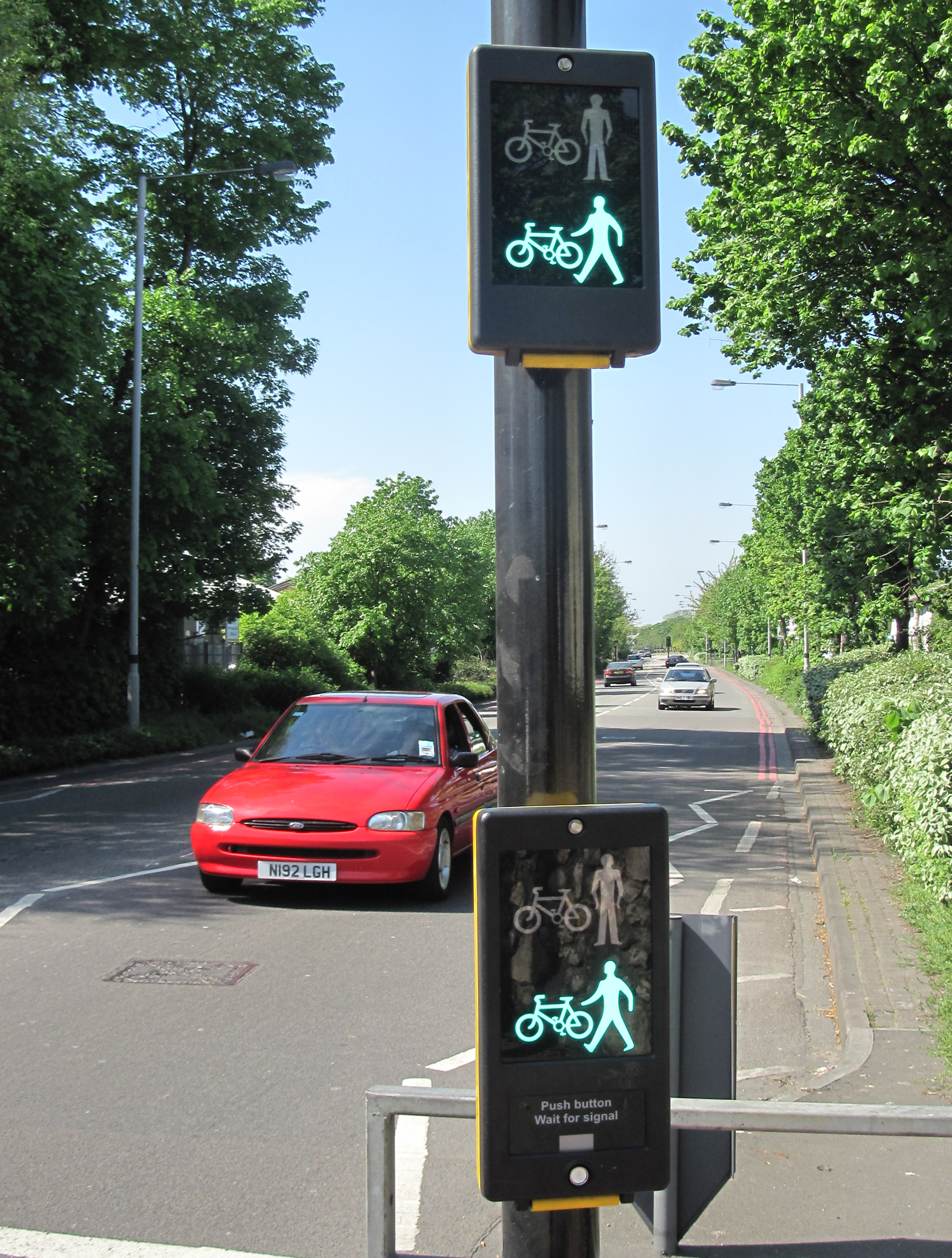
Control panel, London (2011). The signal lights in this example are on the near side, similar to the newer-style puffin crossings.

A toucan crossing is the British term for a type of pedestrian crossing that also allows bicycles to be ridden across. Since "two can" cross together (both pedestrians and cyclists) the name “toucan” was chosen. In the United Kingdom toucan crossings are normally four metres (13 feet) wide, instead of the 2.8 metre (9 feet) width of any pelican crossing or puffin crossing.

There are two types of toucan crossing: on more recently installed ones, a "green bicycle" is displayed next to the "green man" when cyclists and pedestrians are permitted to cross. A red bicycle and red man are shown at other times; older crossings do not have a red bicycle – bicycles are permitted to cross at any time (if it is safe to do so).

Unlike the pelican crossing, before the lights for vehicles go back to green, a steady red and amber are displayed instead of the flashing amber. The pedestrian/cyclist signal lights may be on the near side of the crossing (like a puffin crossing), or on the opposite side of the road (like a pelican crossing). A related crossing type is the pegasus crossing for horse riders.

== See also ==
- Cyclist crossing, part of a road intended to be used by cyclists to cross a carriageway or a bicycle lane
