= Panda crossing =

Type of pedestrian crossing

The panda crossing was a type of signal-controlled pedestrian crossing used in the United Kingdom from 1962 to 1967.

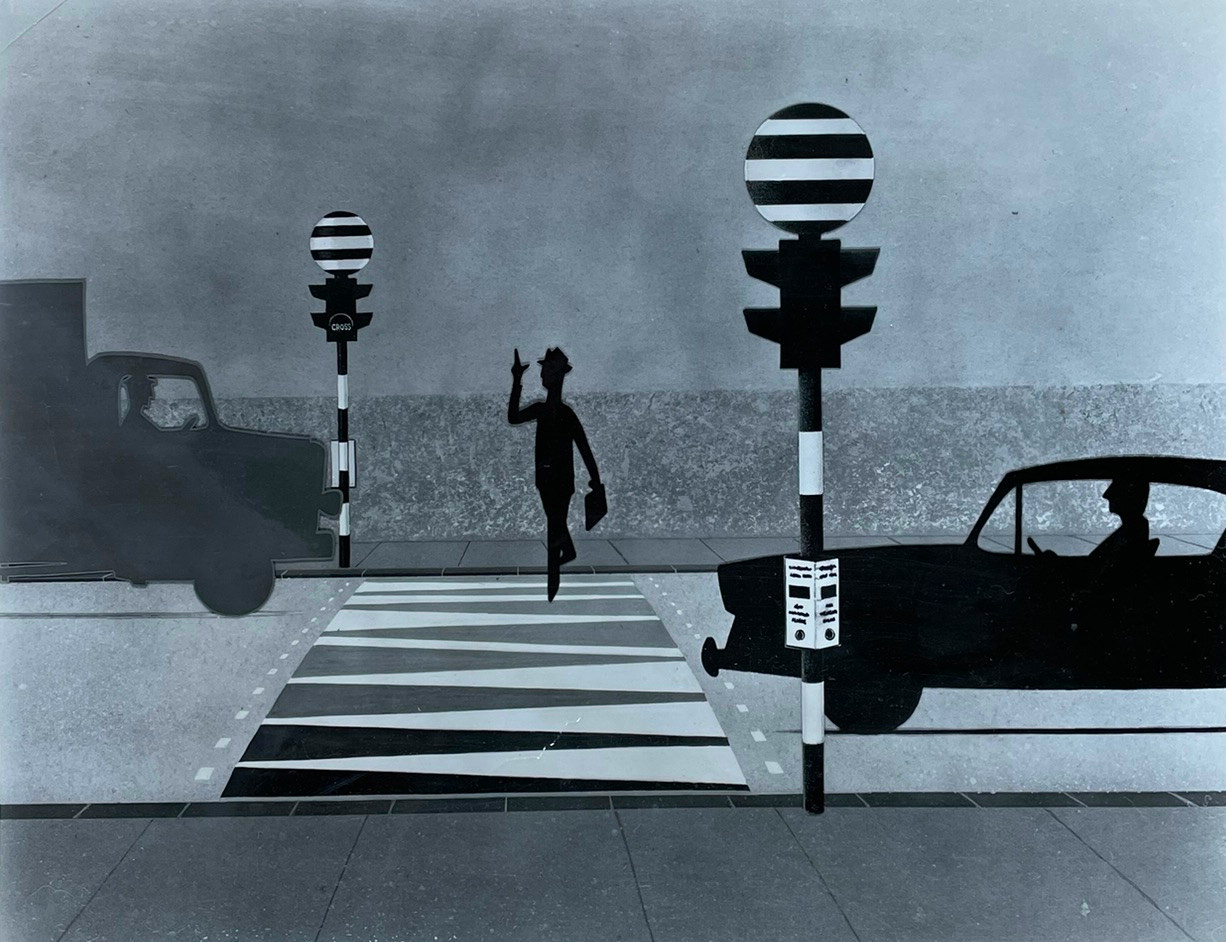
An illustration of a man crossing the road at a Panda crossing

== Background ==
In the early-1960s, the British Ministry of Transport, headed by Ernest Marples, was looking for a way to make pedestrian crossings safer under increasingly heavy traffic conditions. The successful zebra crossing design was not considered safe enough for busy roads and could create traffic delays as pedestrians crossed whenever they wanted. Off-the-shelf light-controlled systems were available but were too expensive for widespread use. Some cities had innovated with their own one-off crossings but the lack of standardisation was considered a safety issue. Furthermore, all existing signalled crossings tended to have two major drawbacks: stopping traffic for long periods of time and appearing to violate contemporary right-of-way law by signalling "Don't cross" to pedestrians (in reality: the 'Don't Cross' indication was not a legally enforceable instruction).

The panda crossing was introduced in 1962 as an attempt to combine the best features of available and experimental crossing systems. The first public example was opened on 2 April of that year outside London Waterloo railway station. The majority of the initial sites used for this experiment were in Guildford where all thirteen existing crossings were converted, and in Lincoln where ten crossings were converted. Further sites across England and Wales increased the size of the experiment to more than forty sites in all.

== Design and operation ==
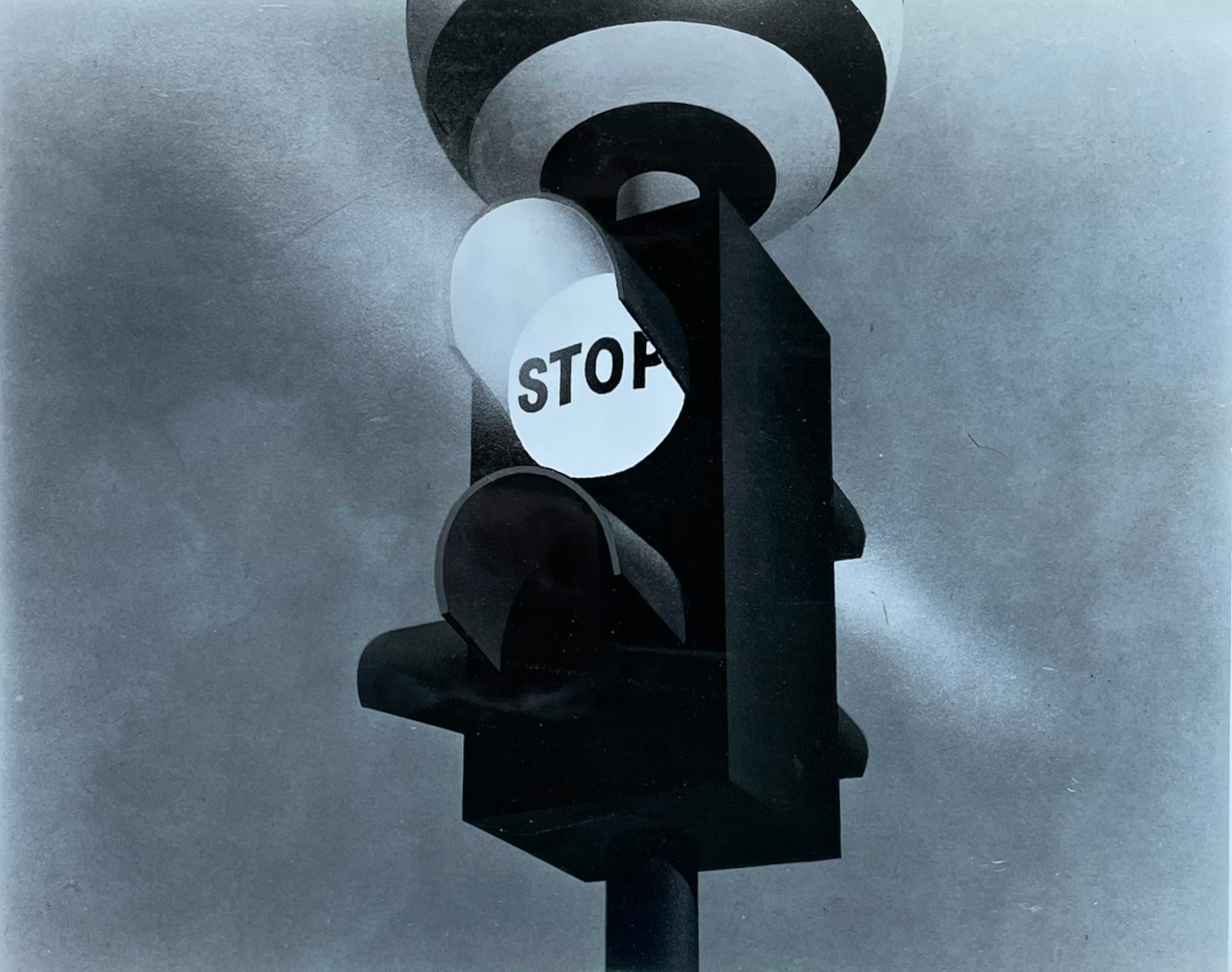
The driver's view of a Panda crossing beacon in the "stop" phase

The layout was superficially similar to a traditional zebra crossing, with a painted area on the road announced by Belisha beacons. For distinction, the panda road pattern was different (triangles rather than stripes) and the beacons were striped, not plain. The main additions were the light signals on the beacon poles. The traffic signals consisted of two lamps, red and amber, while the pedestrians had a single signal displaying the word "Cross" when appropriate.

In the idle state, no lights were lit. A pedestrian wanting to cross would press a button on the beacon pole and be instructed to wait by an illuminated sign near the button.

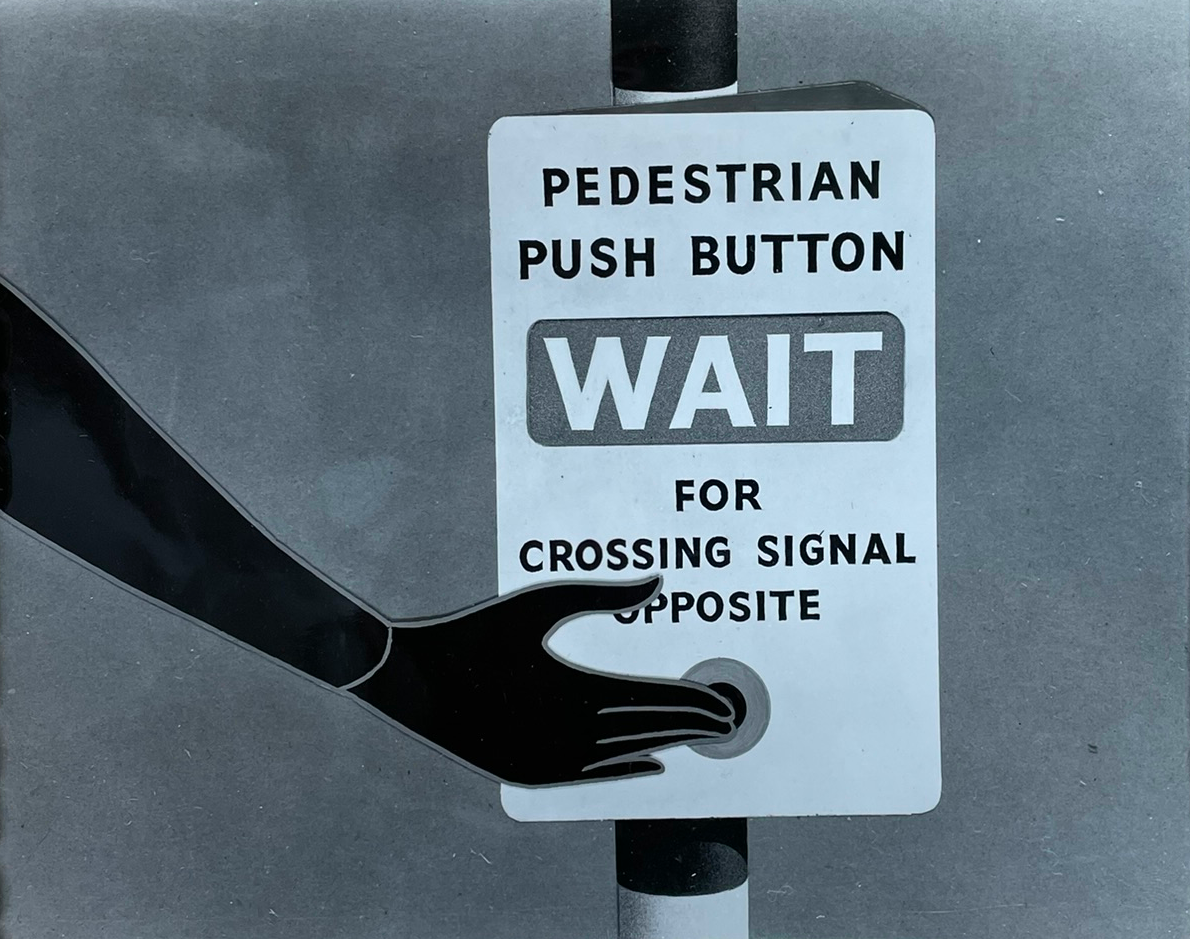
A pedestrian pressing the call button for a Panda crossing

The system allowed for a pause between crossings in order to avoid traffic delays, and so the pedestrian might wait a while before anything happened. The amber traffic light would pulsate for a few seconds to inform motorists that someone was about to cross; a pulsating red light was then the signal to stop. At this point, the pedestrians' "Cross" signal was illuminated. After a few seconds, the "Cross" light started to flash and the red traffic light was changed to a flashing amber (this "flashing" phase was considered distinct from the initial "pulsating" amber light). The "Cross" light, as well as the flashing amber light, flashed increasingly fast as crossing time ran out, and the traffic was allowed to proceed during the flashing amber phase if the crossing was clear. Eventually, all lights were extinguished as the crossing reset.

The panda crossing deliberately omitted any sort of "Don't cross" message for pedestrians in order to avoid breaching the aforementioned right-of-way laws. The measured pause between crossings helped to keep traffic flowing. The light sequence also prevented long delays by allowing traffic to move after a few seconds if nobody was crossing.

Despite its apparent rationality, the panda crossing design was not a success. In particular, the distinction between the flashing and pulsating amber phases was subtle yet highly significant.

== Alternative systems and successors ==
While the panda crossing was still being rolled out, the Ministry of Transport also trialled a "Controlled Traffic Area" which legally restricted when and where pedestrians could cross. This met a widely negative response from the press and the trial abandoned after a year.

By 1967, the panda crossing was a matter of concern for the Ministry of Transport, and so a new type of crossing, the X-way, was introduced. The new system was not phased in gradually by replacement, rather the pandas were removed seemingly as a matter of urgency. The replacement was so urgent that although the X-way lights replaced the panda crossing lights, the road initially retained the black-and-white triangular markings until they could be removed at a later date.

Although the original version of the X-way was also short-lived, it survived with minor modifications to become the more successful pelican crossing, which was introduced in 1969 and remains in widespread use today.
