= Pegasus crossing =

Road crossing for pedestrians and horse riders

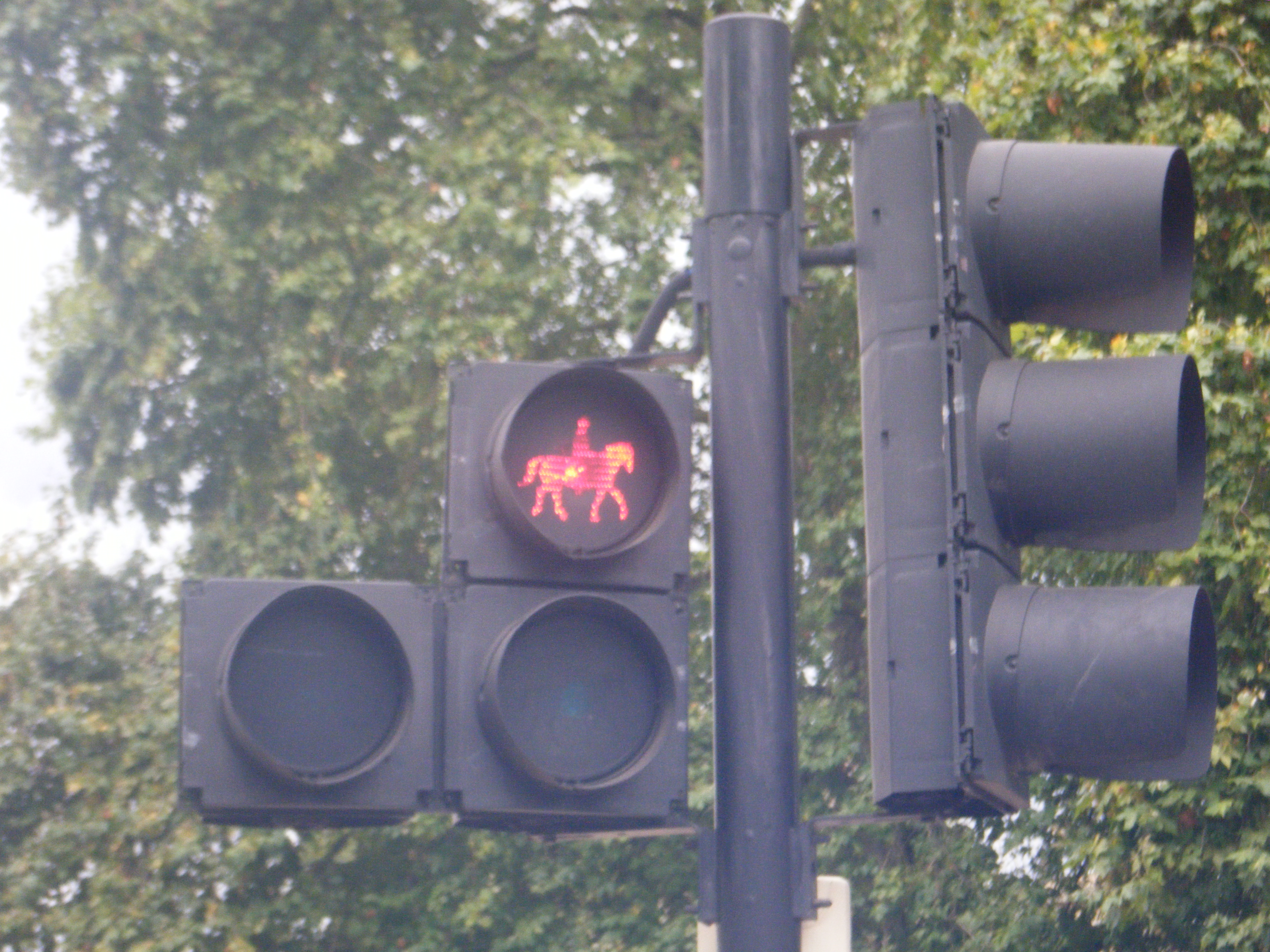
Equestrian crossing, London

A pegasus crossing (United Kingdom; also equestrian crossing) is a type of signalised pedestrian crossing, with special consideration for horse riders. This type of crossing is named after the mythical winged horse, Pegasus. They are primarily used in the United Kingdom and Peru.

At a minimum, these crossings are in the form of a pelican crossing or puffin crossing but simply have two control panels, one at the normal height for pedestrians or dismounted riders, and one two metres above the ground for the use of mounted riders, and the "green man" (walk) and "red man" (stop) pictograms are replaced with horses. Additional features, to improve safety, include a wooden fence or other barrier and a wider crossing so that the horses are further away from vehicles than normal.

If the crossing is to be used by pedestrians and cyclists too, then a parallel, separate toucan crossing may be placed next to the pegasus crossing.

== Installation Locations ==
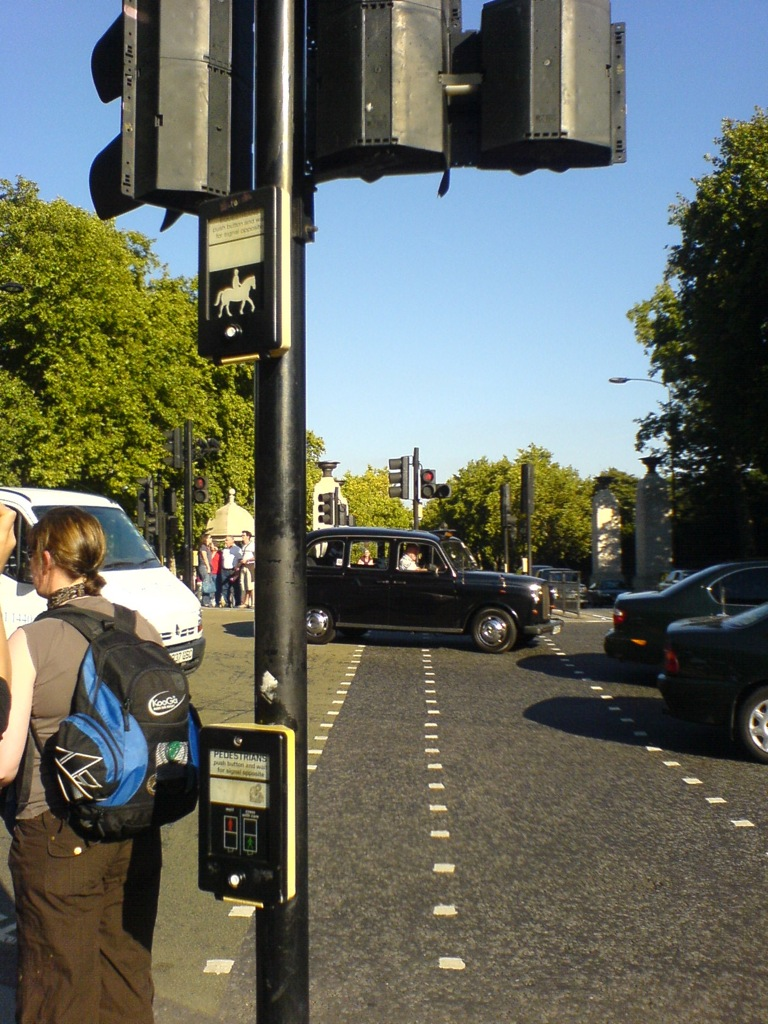
A pegasus crossing in Hyde Park Corner, London. It includes two demand buttons, one raised for equestrians.

There are examples in Hyde Park, Richmond Park and village area of Wimbledon in London; Rayleigh, Colchester and Great Notley in Essex and Worsley, Salford as well as near Epsom Downs Racecourse, Surrey and in Colton on the former A6120 (now B6902) in Leeds. The crossing in Colton has a separate gravel covered section, signposted for use by horses only, located at 53.795888,-1.436130. Another example is situated between Whitby and Robin Hood's Bay, North Yorkshire on Stainsacre Lane.

After completion of upgrading the A66 between Greta Bridge–Scotch Corner in 2007, two pegasus crossings were installed on the section of the dual carriageway in 2009, immediately to the west of Scotch Corner. These crossings included raised buttons for horse riders, safety fences and lights to control the traffic which consisted of only two orange lights. These crossings never became operational and with the exception of the safety fences were later removed.

There are also examples in use in Lima, Peru.

== Gallery ==
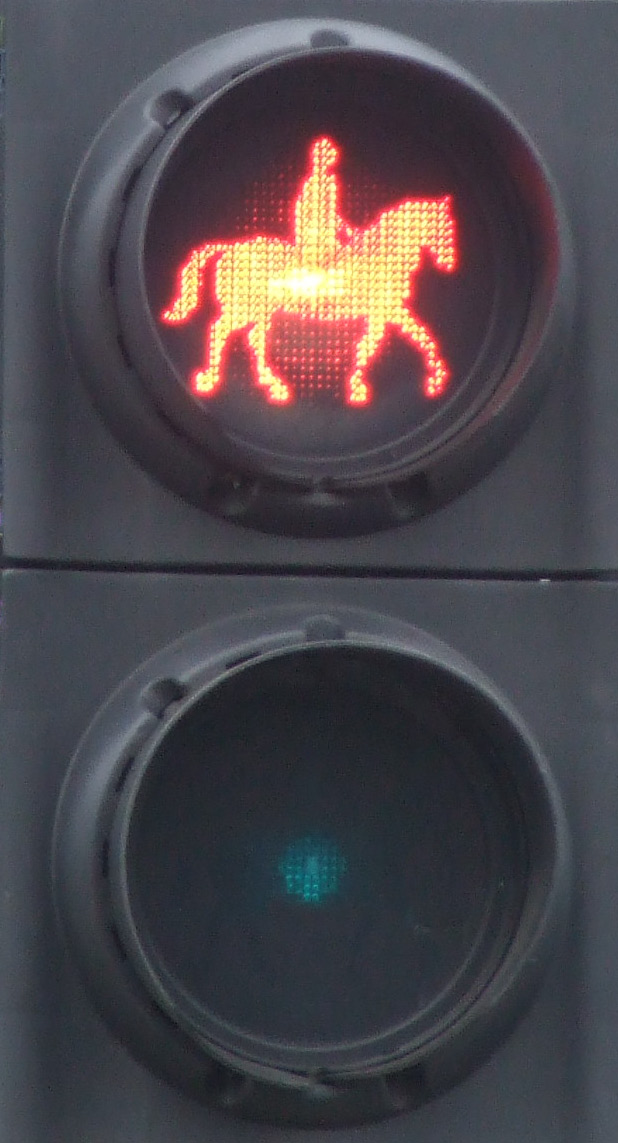
"Pegasus" lights

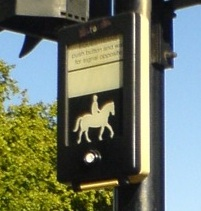
Control panel for equestrians, London

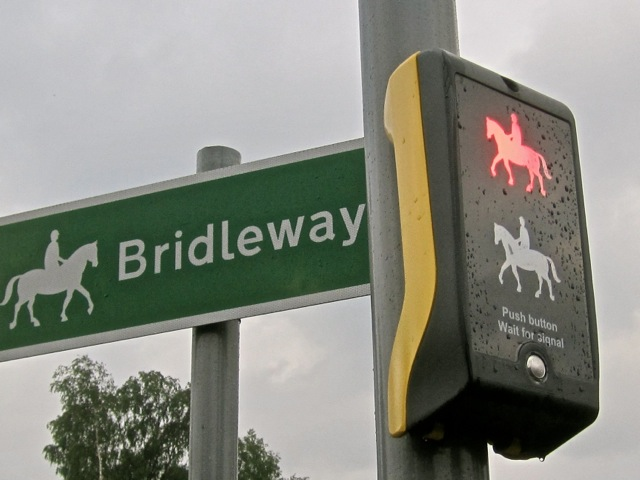
Worsley, Salford

== See also ==
- Traffic light control and coordination
- Pelican crossing
- Puffin crossing
- Toucan crossing
- Zebra crossing
