= Rotating cone tactile device =

Haptic assistive device at pedestrian crossings

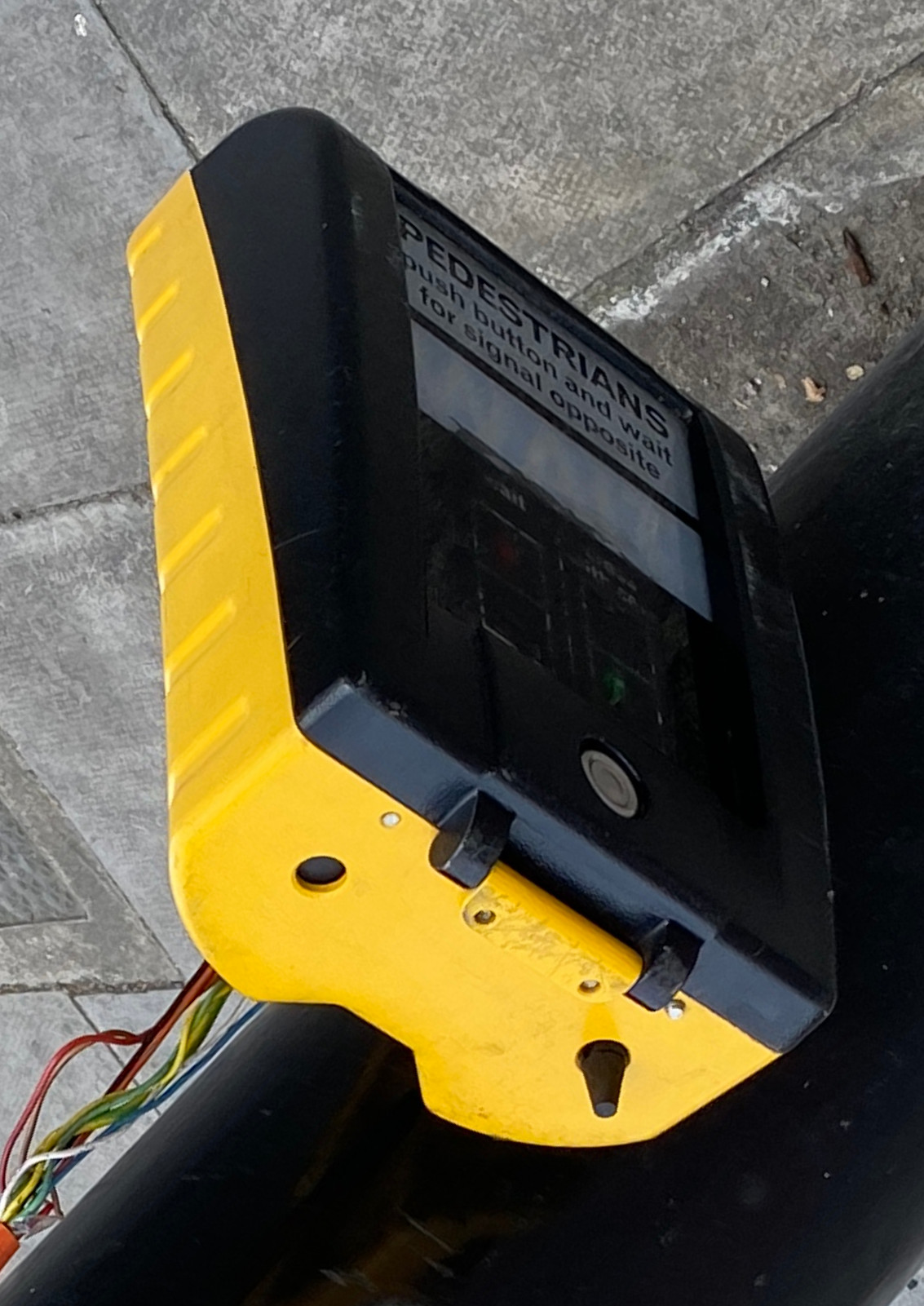
Cone on the right hand side of the underside of a pelican crossing control box

A rotating cone tactile device is a haptic device used at traffic light controlled pedestrian crossings in the United Kingdom. It is used as a tactile signal for blind pedestrians to indicate that it is safe to cross the road.

The idea for the devices originated at the University of Nottingham in the 1980s.

== See also ==
- Tactile paving
