= Belisha beacon =

Design of lamp

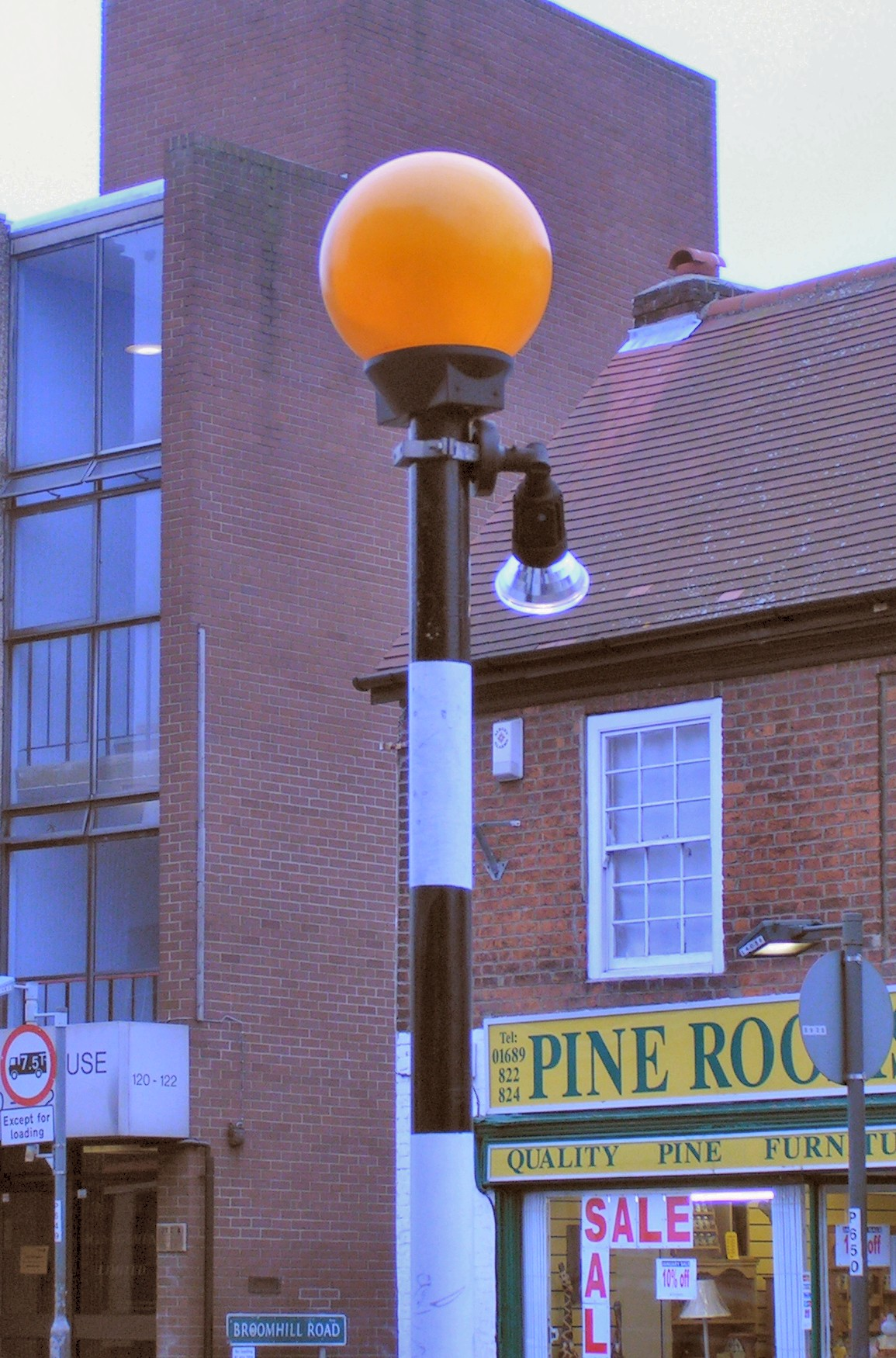
A Belisha beacon atop its striped pole. This example also features a spot lamp to illuminate the crossing at night.

A Belisha beacon (/bəˈliːʃə/) is a yellow-coloured globe lamp atop a tall black and white striped pole, marking pedestrian crossings of roads in the United Kingdom, Ireland, and other places that were historically influenced by Britain, such as Hong Kong, Cyprus, Malta, New Zealand and Singapore. The beacons were named after Leslie Hore-Belisha (1893–1957), the Minister of Transport who, in 1934, added beacons to pedestrian crossings, marked by large metal studs in the road surface. These crossings were later painted in black and white stripes, and thus are known as zebra crossings. Legally, pedestrians have priority (over vehicles in the carriageway) on such crossings. (Note: In Great Britain, Highway Code rule 195 states that "you should give way to pedestrians waiting to cross" and "you MUST give way when a pedestrian has moved onto a crossing". The word "MUST" reflects a legal requirement, the relevant legislation being cited as "ZPPPCRGD reg 25". The other statement is not a legal requirement, but the advice in the Highway Code is admissible as evidence of what constitutes an acceptable standard of driving, for example for the offence of driving without due care and attention.)

== History ==
The UK Ministry of Transport decided to erect ‘Belisha beacons’ at kerbside, alongside pedestrian crossings. The first Belisha beacons were erected in the London authorities areas and, following the Road Traffic Act 1934, were rolled out nationally in 1935. In December 1941, a study was made into the cost effectiveness of melting down the 64,000 Belisha beacon posts to make munitions, a plan which threatened to "deprive the right hon. Member for Devonport (Mr. Hore-Belisha) of his last hope of immortality."

In 1948, the Central Office of Information produced a short film which showed the correct way to use a pedestrian crossing (without the stripes at this time).

Pedestrian Crossing, a public information film from 1948

Belisha beacons provide additional visibility to zebra crossings for motorists, primarily at night. The UK flash rate is 750 ms on, 750 ms off. Some crossings are set so that each beacon flashes alternately to the other side, but they often fall out of synchronisation over time. Beacons with an outer ring of flashing yellow LED lights, preferred for their brightness and low electricity consumption, are replacing traditional incandescent bulbs in many areas.

Some of the crossings have plastic poles that are translucent, and lit internally. This is immediately apparent in dull weather and at night. The clearly illuminated white sections announce the presence of the poles carrying the yellow globes, increasing the visibility of the crossings to all road users. These illuminated white sections can, however, obscure the presence of a pedestrian waiting to cross, as a driver cannot see the dark shape behind the brighter light coming from the pole.

To be legally compliant in the UK, every zebra crossing must be equipped with two Belisha beacons. In cases where there is a traffic island or central reservation in the road, the traffic authority can opt whether to place one or more beacons centrally. An exception is crossings over cycle paths, which do not need beacons.

Since the introduction of new regulations in 1997, the number of zebra crossings and Belisha beacons has fallen in the northern counties of England, being replaced by pelican crossings or puffin crossings, with pedestrian-controlled traffic signals; a waiting pedestrian can stop vehicular traffic by pressing a button, and waiting for the pedestrian signal of a red and green man to change to green.

== Outside the United Kingdom ==
=== Australia ===
In Australia, there has been a proliferation of various kinds of beacons and bollards, illuminated, reflective, or otherwise designed for high visibility at pedestrian crossings, to which the name Belisha is occasionally erroneously applied. These high-visibility crossing markers are often placed on refuge islands in the middle of the road, in addition to or instead of at the roadside. Many of these new crossings are signposted that pedestrians must give way to traffic.

Brisbane briefly had a small number of Belisha beacon marked crossings in the late 1960s and early 1970s, but the majority of Australian crossings are zebra crossings marked by large yellow circular signs bearing a walking legs symbol.

=== Germany ===
==== East Germany ====
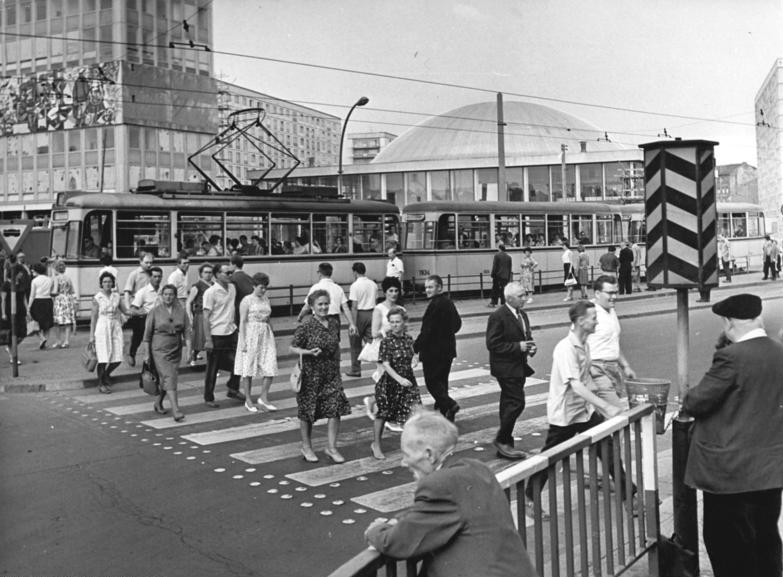
A belisha beacon in East Germany

East Germany used a unique design of Belisha beacon during the 1960s. Instead of a globe, the lamp sat in a black and yellow striped box which in turn sat on top of a yellow post. These were abolished in 1977, although use was continued on major roads until the fall of the Berlin Wall

==== West Germany ====
A diagram for Belisha beacons in the 1956 West German regulations

In 1956 regulations allowed for Belisha beacons to be placed at zebra crossings. Unlike Belisha beacons elsewhere, these Belisha beacons had red and white striped posts with a white globe. These were abolished in 1964.

=== Hong Kong ===
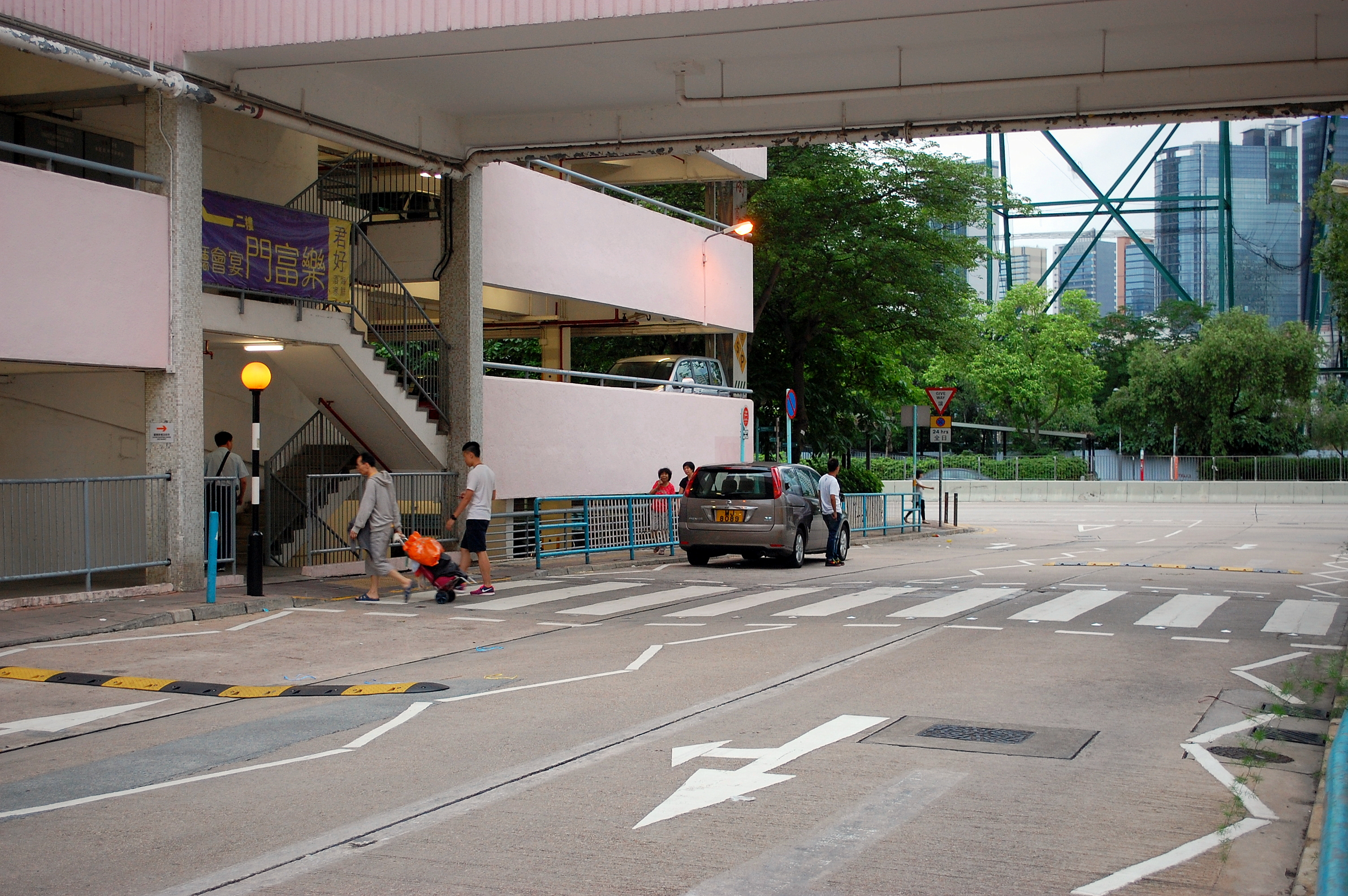
A zebra crossing outfitted with Belisha beacons in Hong Kong

In Hong Kong, Belisha beacons are required by the Transport Department of Hong Kong for pedestrian crossings to be considered a "zebra crossing" where pedestrians have priority. The yellow globe on the beacon may be illuminated by a flashing light or by a constant light.

Similar to the United Kingdom, two Belisha beacons are required, each to be put at each end of the zebra crossing. When there is a pedestrian refuge of central reservation, additional Belisha beacons may be added.

=== Ireland ===
The new pedestrian crossing sign in Ireland, featuring a fluorescent yellow background

In Ireland, Belisha beacons are usually accompanied by much higher visibility dual flashing amber traffic lights on either side. Some zebra crossings have only these rather than Belisha beacons.

In October 2022, the National Transport Authority began a pilot scheme with Limerick City and County Council and Dún Laoghaire-Rathdown County Council to trial the implementation of zebra crossings without Belisha beacons, instead using fixed blue mandatory signs, such as are used in Continental Europe. These crossings will be cheaper and quicker to implement, as they do not require an electrical connection. The signs were adopted in March 2024, though beacons are still permitted to be used.

=== New Zealand ===
Outside of the UK, Belisha beacons are perhaps most prominent in New Zealand, where they are required at all marked pedestrian crossings. Traffic regulations require a controlling authority to erect on each pole, indicating the presence and position of a pedestrian crossing, either an internally illuminated amber globe not less than 300 mm (12 in) in diameter, which has a lamp that provides 40 to 60 flashes per minute, or a 400 mm (16 in) diameter fluorescent orange disc. The pole must be erected within 2 metres (6.6 ft) of each end of a crossing. The poles must be not less than 75 mm (3.0 in) in diameter, and not less than 2 metres (6.6 ft) in height, and must be clearly painted with alternate parallel bands of black and white, each having a width of approximately 300 mm (12 in). Discs are a relatively new addition as a replacement for illuminated globes, having only become prominent since the 1990s.

=== Poland ===
Belisha beacons were uncommon, but the Highway Code allowed for using them up until the early 1960s.

=== Netherlands ===
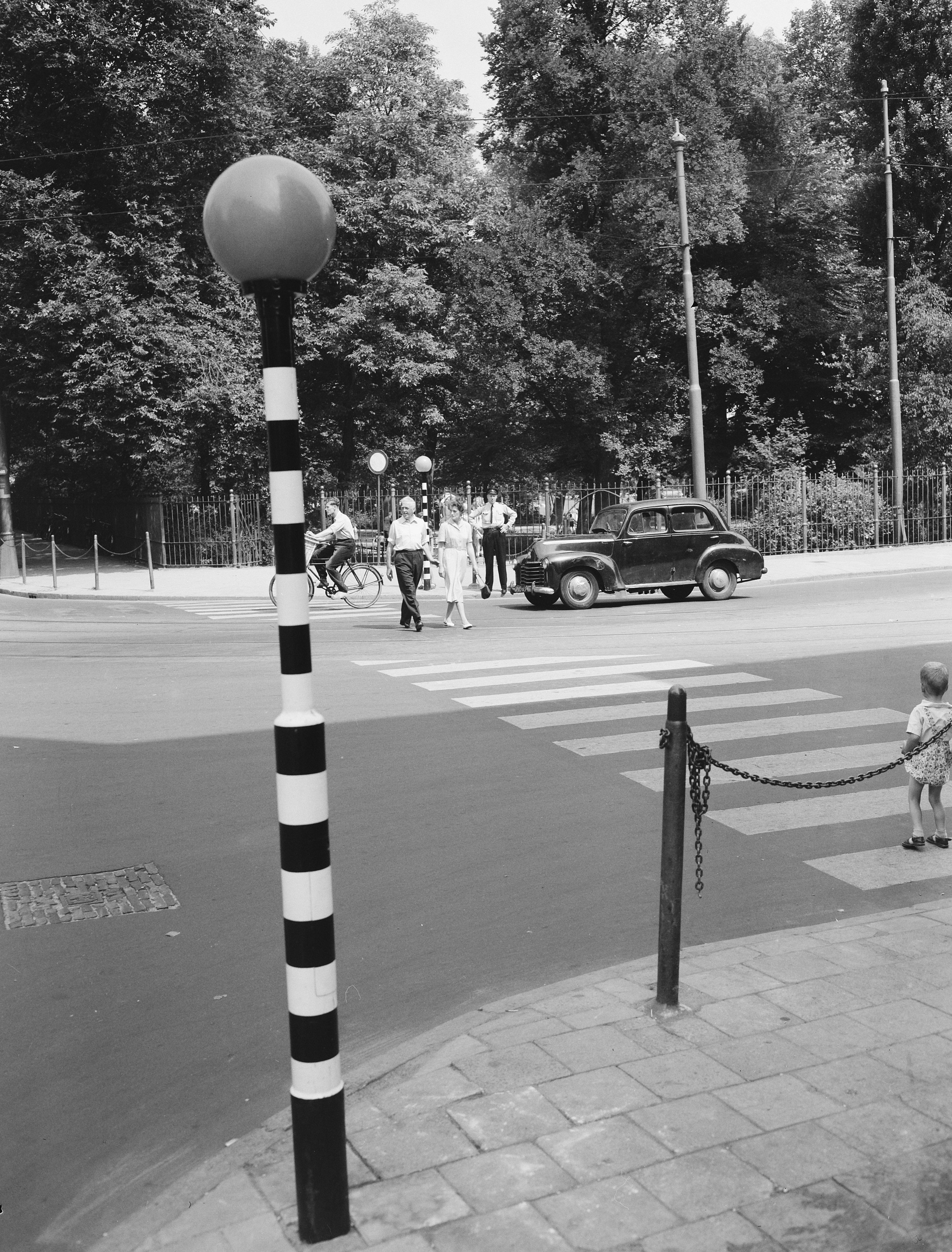
A belisha beacon in the Netherlands

In the Netherlands, Belisha beacons were used from 1957 to 1962 to indicate that pedestrians had the right of way on a particular crossing. In 1962, a law was passed that extended this to all zebra crossings, and the beacons were removed. However, some still exist in Vlaardingen, in addition to the media area in Hilversum.

=== Singapore ===
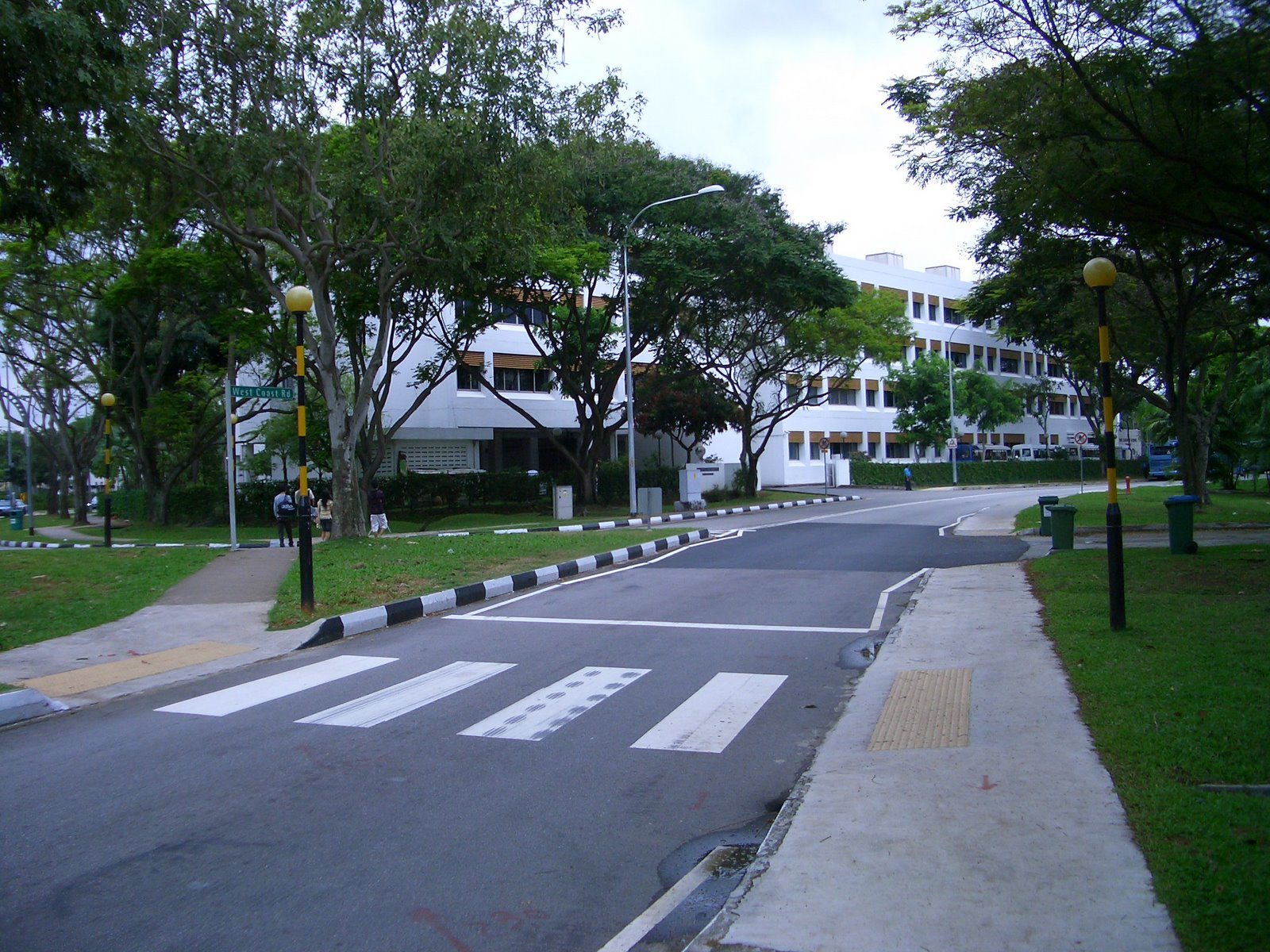
Example of Belisha beacons at a zebra crossing in Singapore

In Singapore, all zebra crossings are marked by Belisha beacons.

=== France and Spain ===
In France and Spain, a small number of pedestrian crossings are illuminated by special lamp posts that have flashing amber lights on their sides that play the same role as Belisha beacons.

=== Liberia ===
Belisha beacons ranged all over Liberian zebra crossings from 1960 to 2010, and some were still in use from 2010 to 2013.

== Games ==
Belisha beacons inspired a popular card game called 'Belisha'. It was aimed to teach road safety to children. It featured pictures of road scenes and a few notable places, like Gretna Green and Robin Hood's Well. The gameplay was based on the game Rummy.

It also inspired an anarchic Blackpool arcade game called ‘Belisha Beacons’ in which contestants would throw balls at traffic signs.

== Images ==
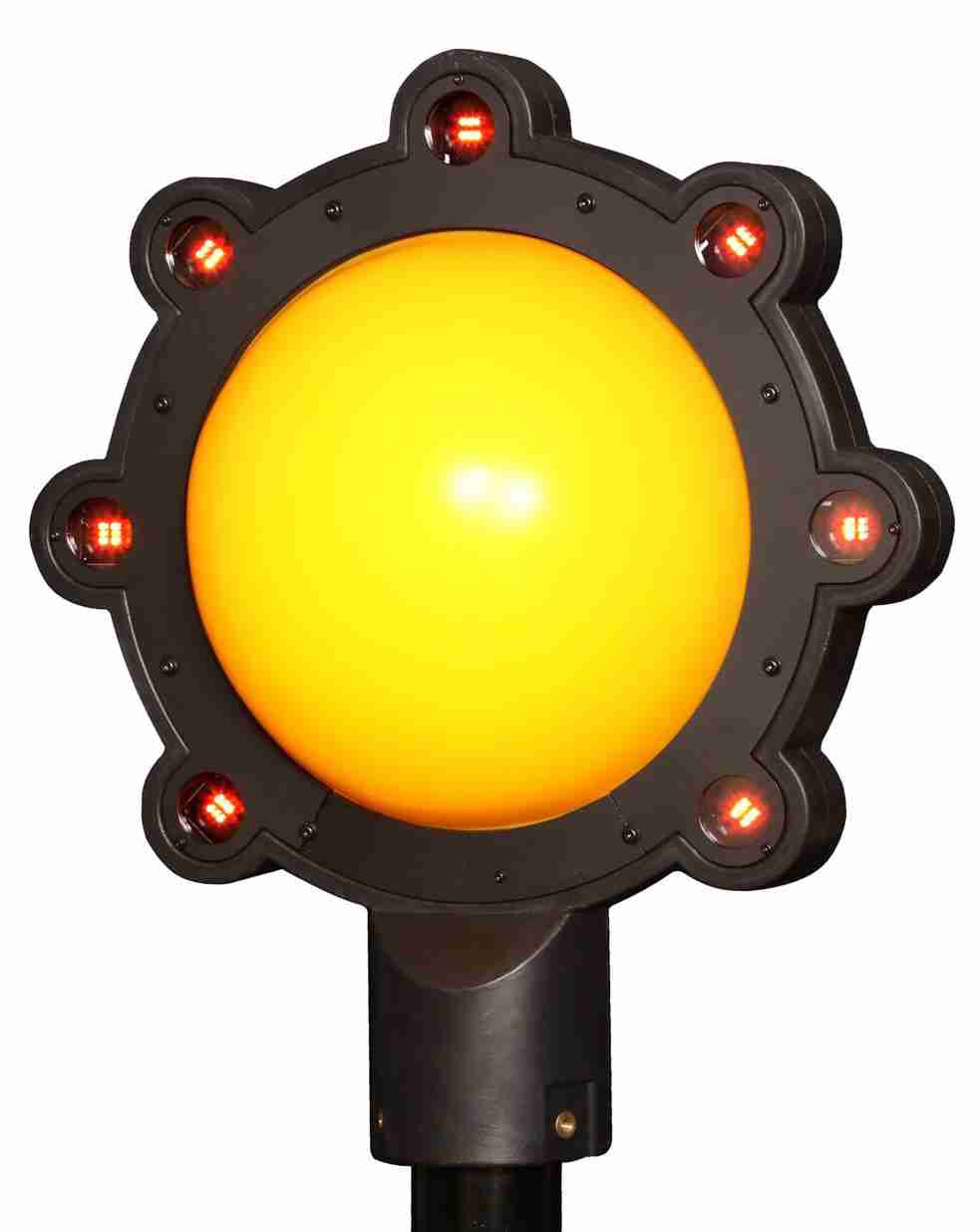
High Visibility Belisha Beacon

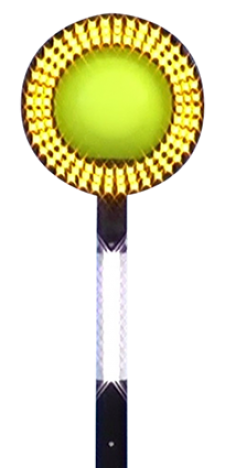
LED halo zebra crossing beacon

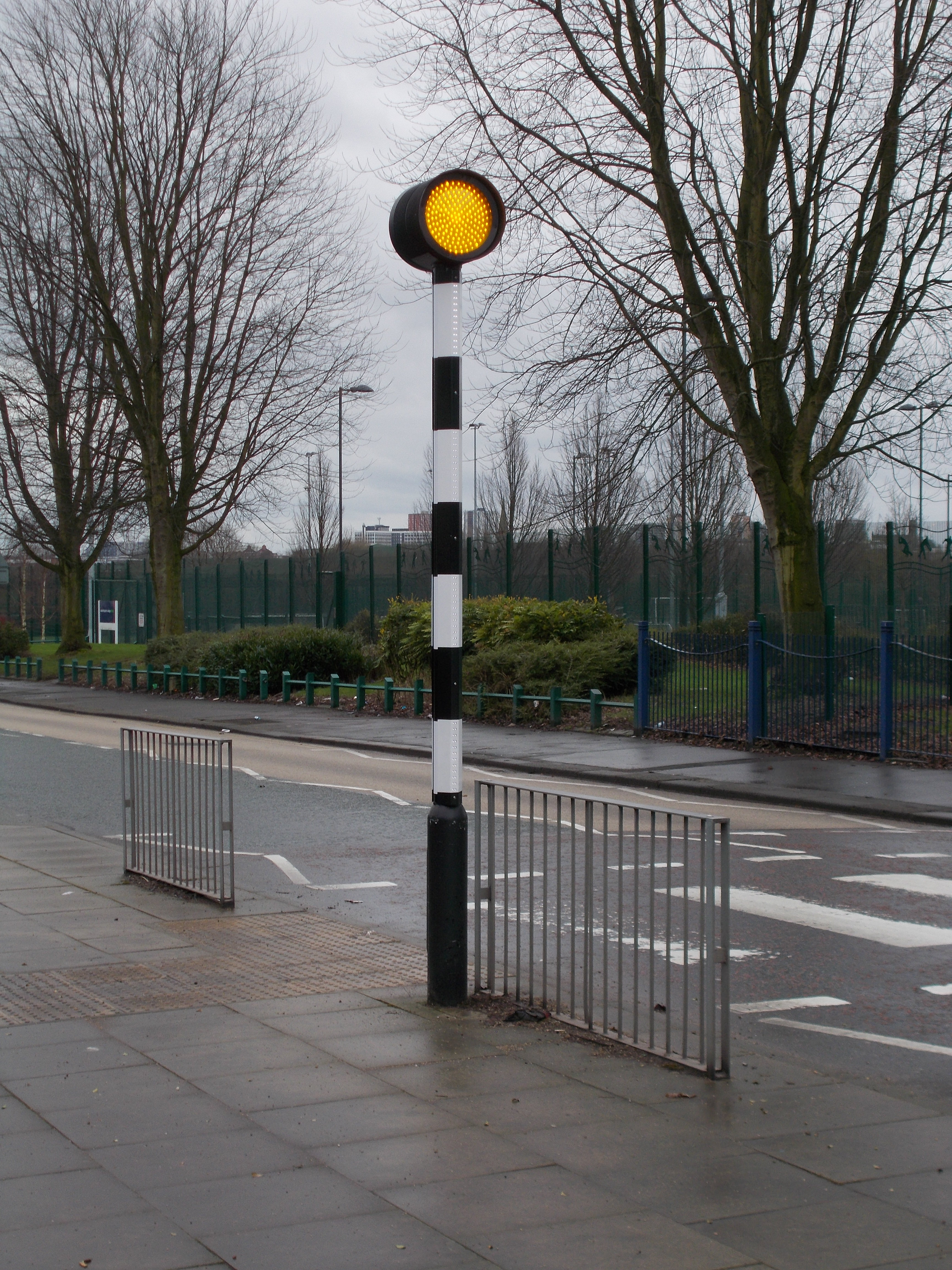
LED Belisha beacon and illuminated post

NZ Transport Agency diagram for a Belisha beacon device in New Zealand

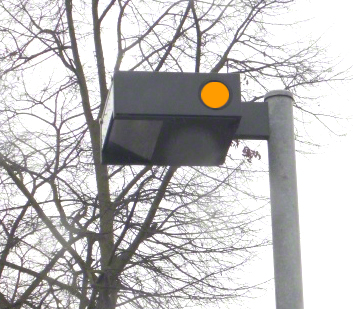
French street light with two amber flashing lights on its sides
