= Pelican crossing =

Type of pedestrian crossing

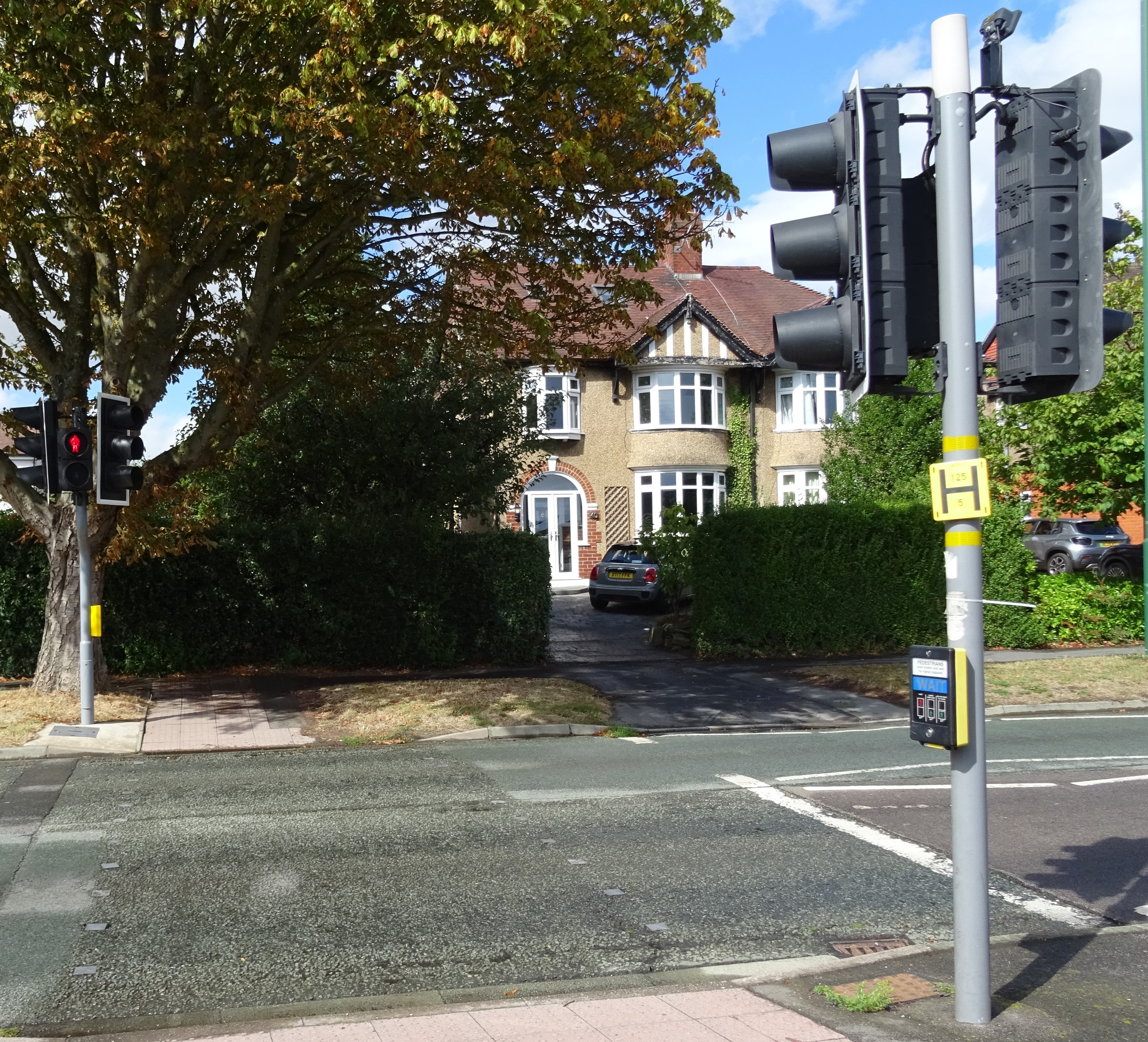
A pelican crossing in England in 2025.

A pelican crossing is a type of pedestrian crossing with traffic signals for both pedestrians and vehicular traffic, activated by call buttons for pedestrians, with the walk signal being directly across the road from the pedestrian. Pelican crossings are ubiquitous in many countries, but usage of the phrase "pelican crossing" is confined mainly to the UK and Ireland. The design was originally introduced in the United Kingdom; they are also found in the Isle of Man, the Channel Islands, Ireland, Indonesia and Australia. The crossings began to be phased out in Great Britain in 2016, being replaced with puffin crossings which have pedestrian signals above the call button rather than across the road.

The pelican crossing is usually formed of two poles on either side of the road, each containing three signal heads (one in each direction for drivers and one facing pedestrians) and a call button unit for pedestrians to operate the crossing. The crossing type is distinctive for fixed signal timings (as opposed to the variable timings of puffin crossings and the flashing amber/green man phase, which allows the crossing to clear and drivers to continue when it is). An audible bleep and tactile rotating cone are normally present to aid visually impaired pedestrians.

A comparable system called the HAWK beacon is used in the United States.

== Etymology ==
The name is derived from PELICON, a portmanteau of pedestrian light controlled. The term pelican crossing originated in the United Kingdom, Crown Dependencies and British Overseas Territories, but similar traffic control devices are in use throughout the world. The term is also used occasionally in the Republic of Ireland.

== History ==
=== Development ===
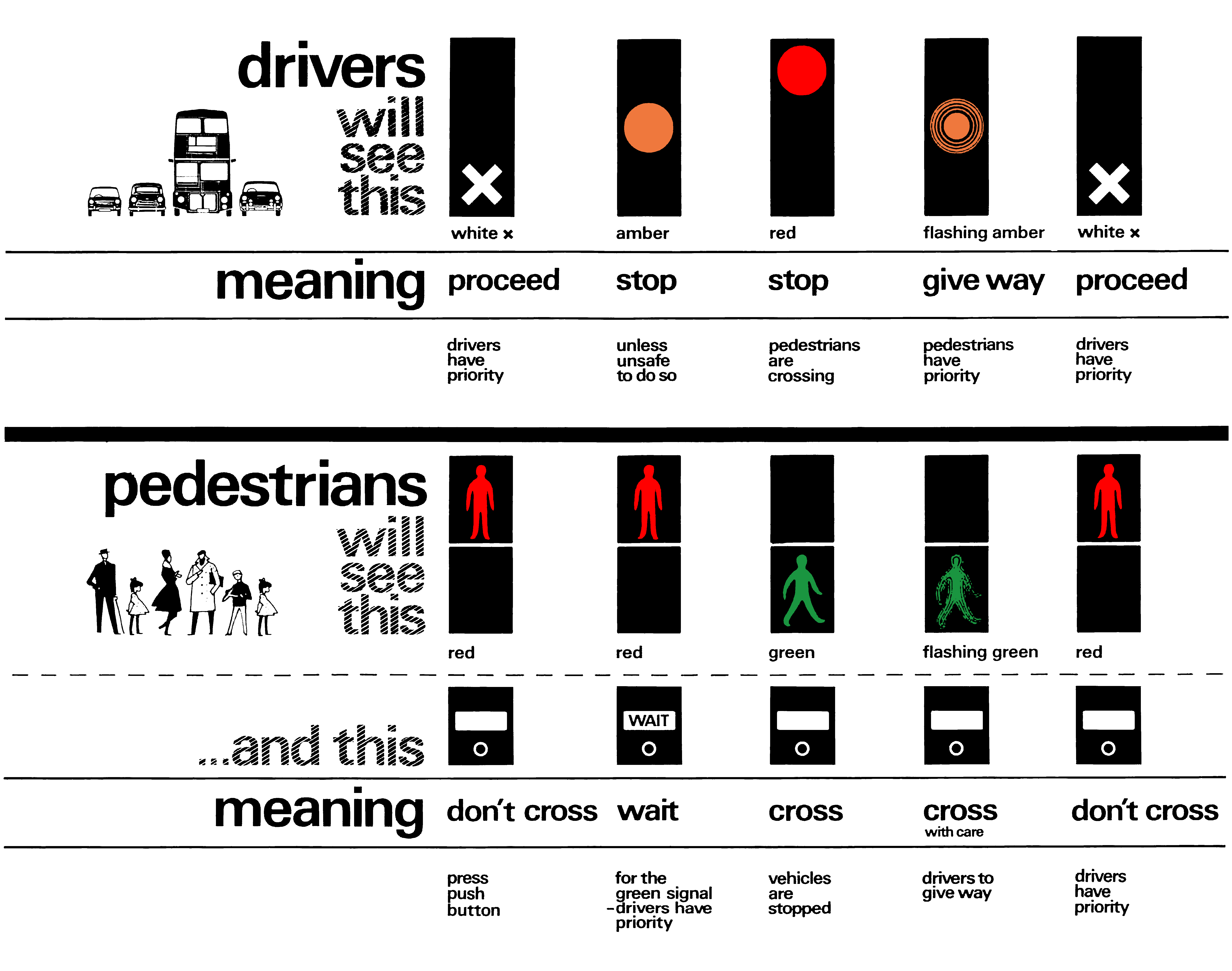
Signals used on the older "X-way" crossing design. (Extract from 1960s UK government leaflet).

The pelican crossing was a relatively minor development of the previously trialled "X-way" crossing. This was largely identical to the pelican crossing, but instead of a green light for motorists, featured a white diagonal cross. The intention of this was to distinguish the crossing lights from any nearby junction (standard) traffic lights. The white cross was widely criticised and users and motoring organisations alike called for the white cross to be replaced by a green light.

With this change in place, along with some alterations to the light timings and road markings, the "X-way" crossing became the pelican crossing.

=== Introduction ===
"Pelican" Pedestrian Crossings Regulations and General Directions 1969
- Statutory Instrument
- Parliament of the United Kingdom
- Citation: SI 1969/888

Dates
- Made: 30 June 1969
- Laid before Parliament: 8 July 1969
- Commencement: 11 July 1969
Other legislation
Made under	Road Traffic Regulation Act 1967

Text of statute as originally enacted

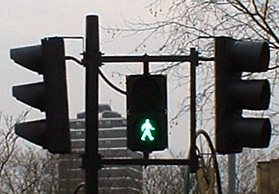
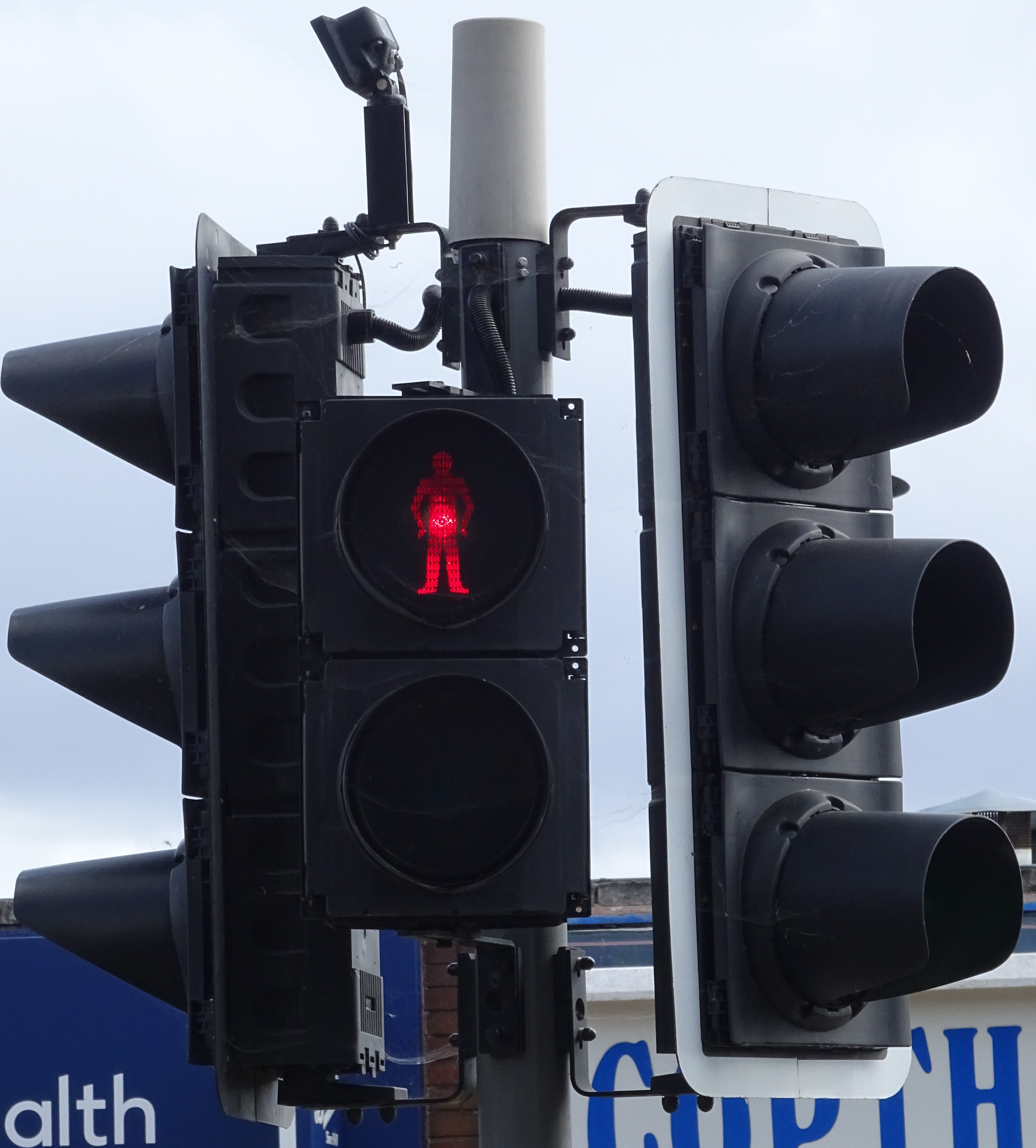
The green man (left) and red man signals (right).
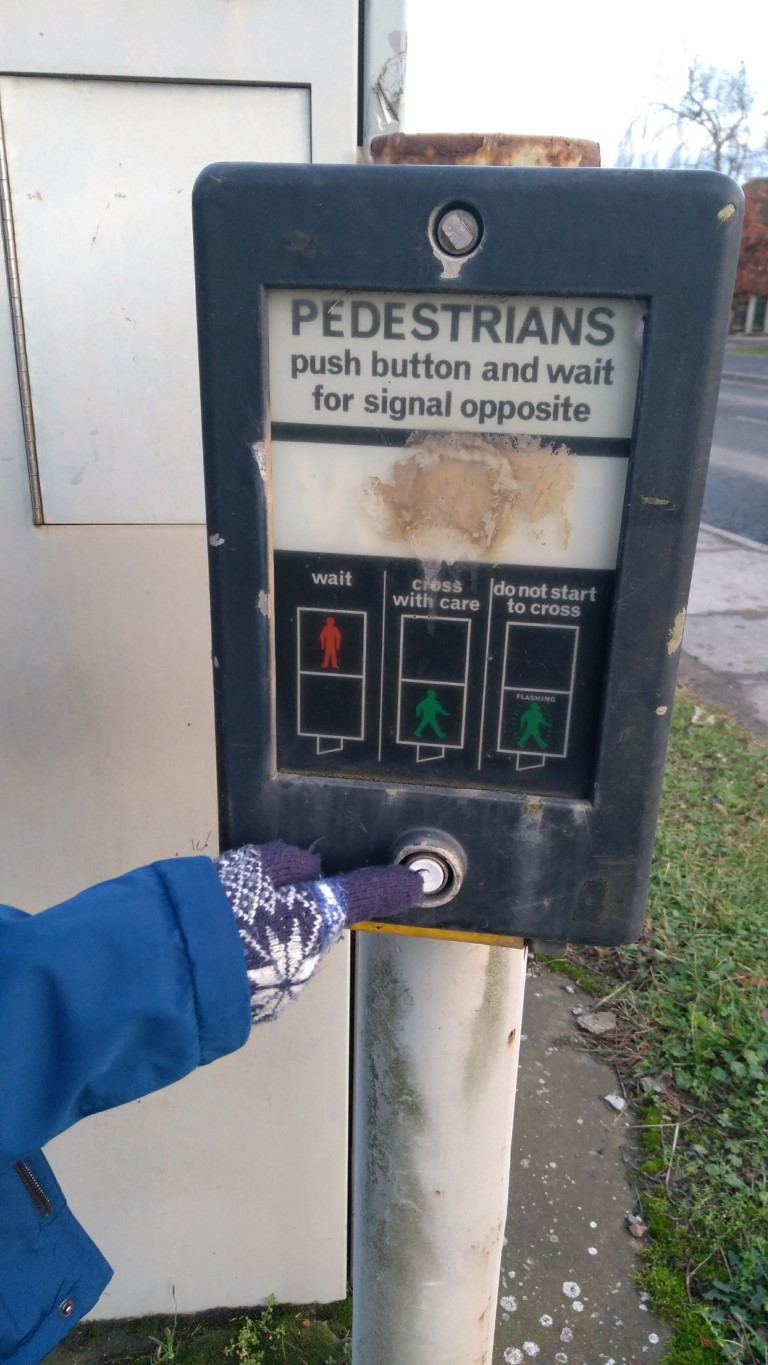
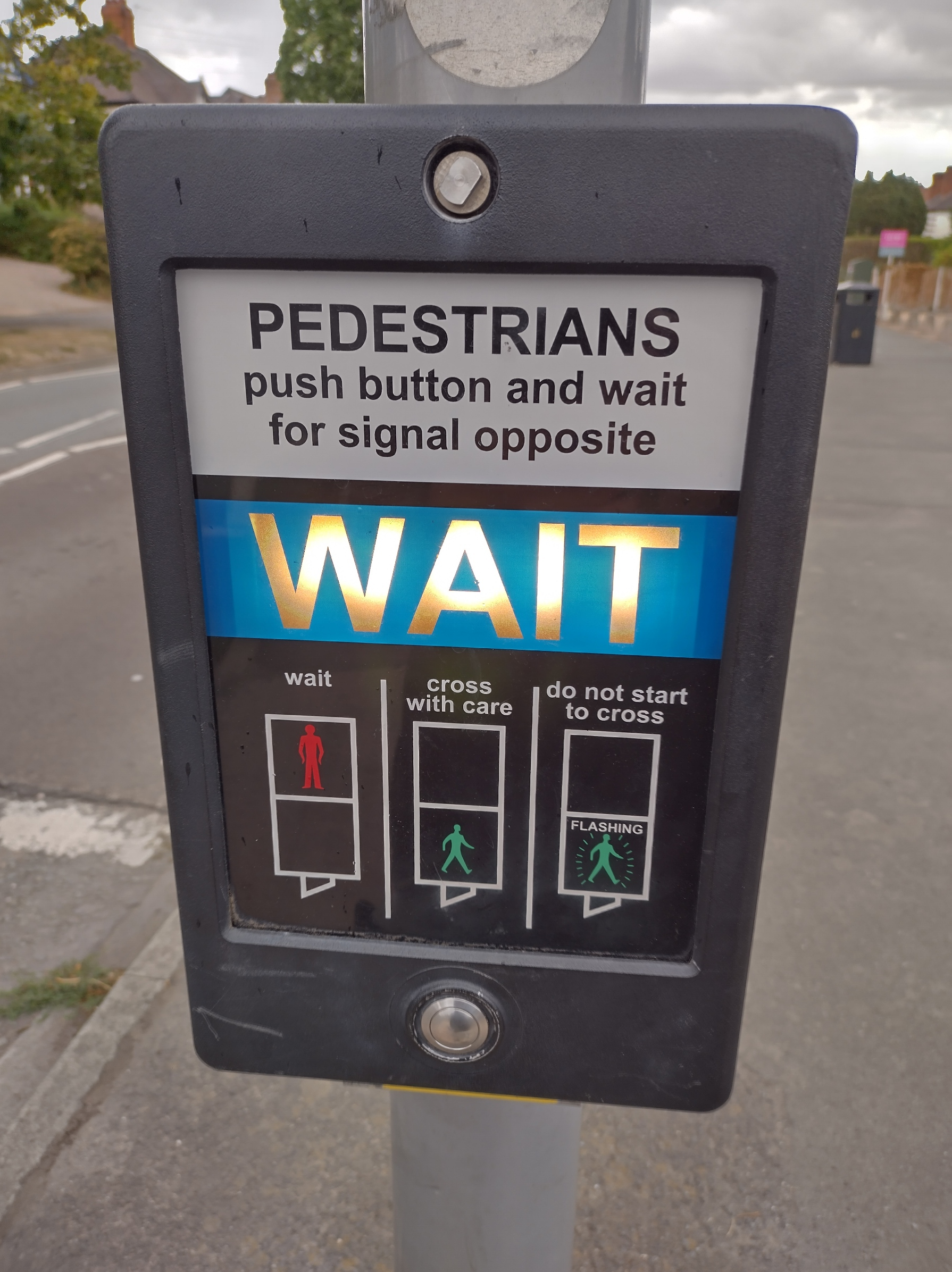
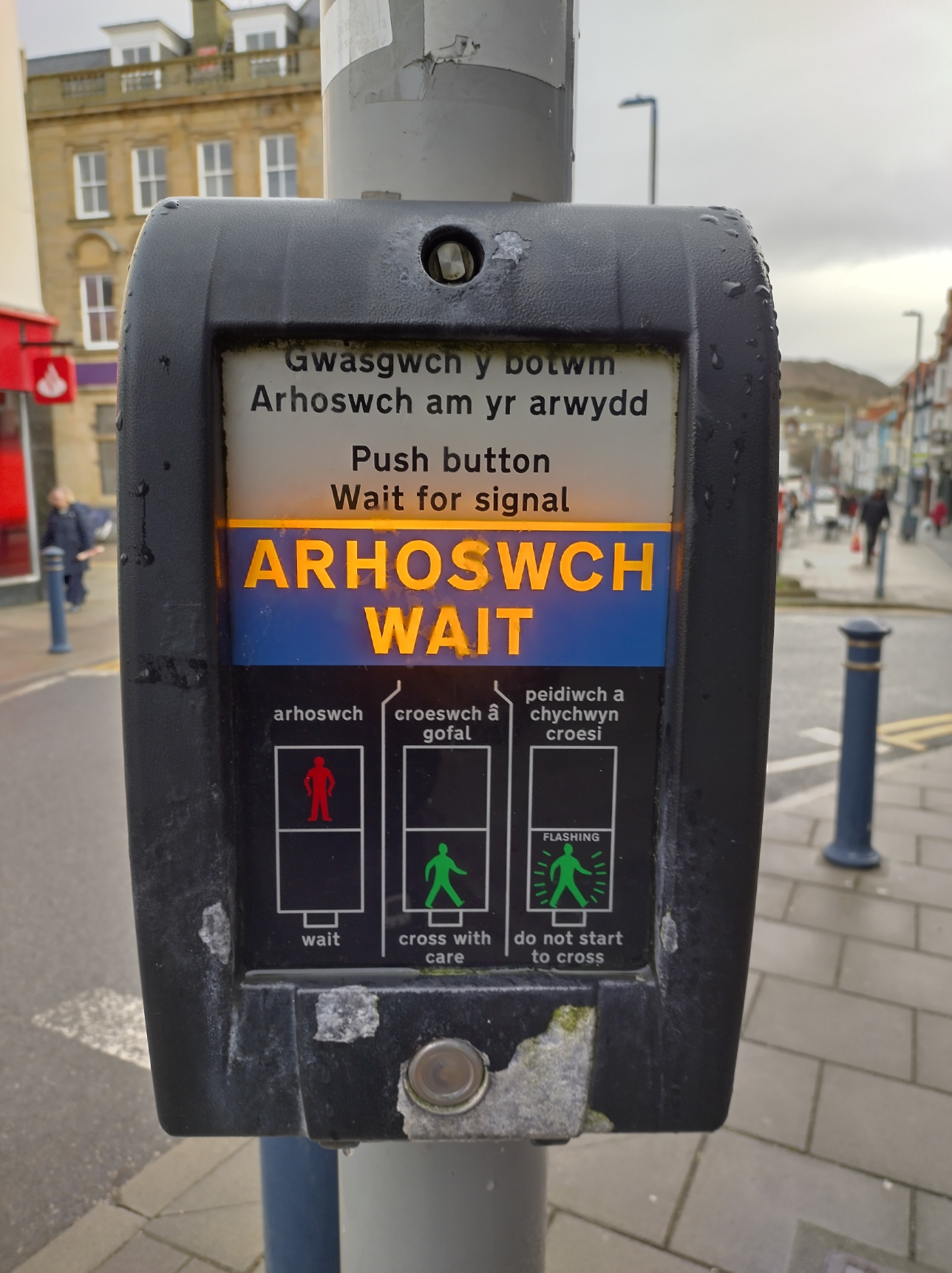
Old (left) and newer style (centre) control buttons with instructions. The "Wait" lights are amber and white respectively. A bilingual button (in Welsh and English) in Wales is seen illuminated in amber (right).

In the United Kingdom, the pelican crossing was the first definitive light-controlled crossing for pedestrians, introduced in 1969 by the "Pelican" Pedestrian Crossings Regulations and General Directions 1969 (SI 1969/888). This was after the earlier failed experiment of the panda crossing. Previously only zebra crossings had been used, which have warning signals (Belisha beacons), but no control signals.

In 1974, cast from Dad's Army performed a public information film to explain the pelican crossing, and how it works. In 1976, Paul Greenwood sang "The Pelican Crossing Song", again explaining how a pelican crossing works.

Changes to the regulations surrounding pelican crossings published in the Pelican Pedestrian Crossings Regulations and General Directions 1987 (SI 1987/16) included the introduction of zig-zag markings, matching those used on the Zebra crossing, from 1989.

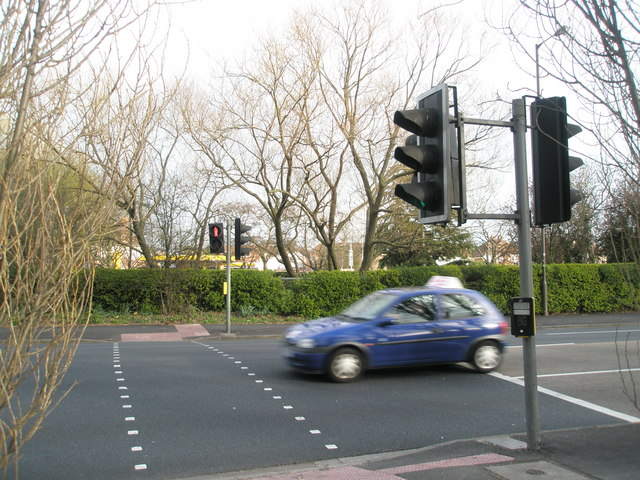
An older pelican crossing in England seen in 2008.

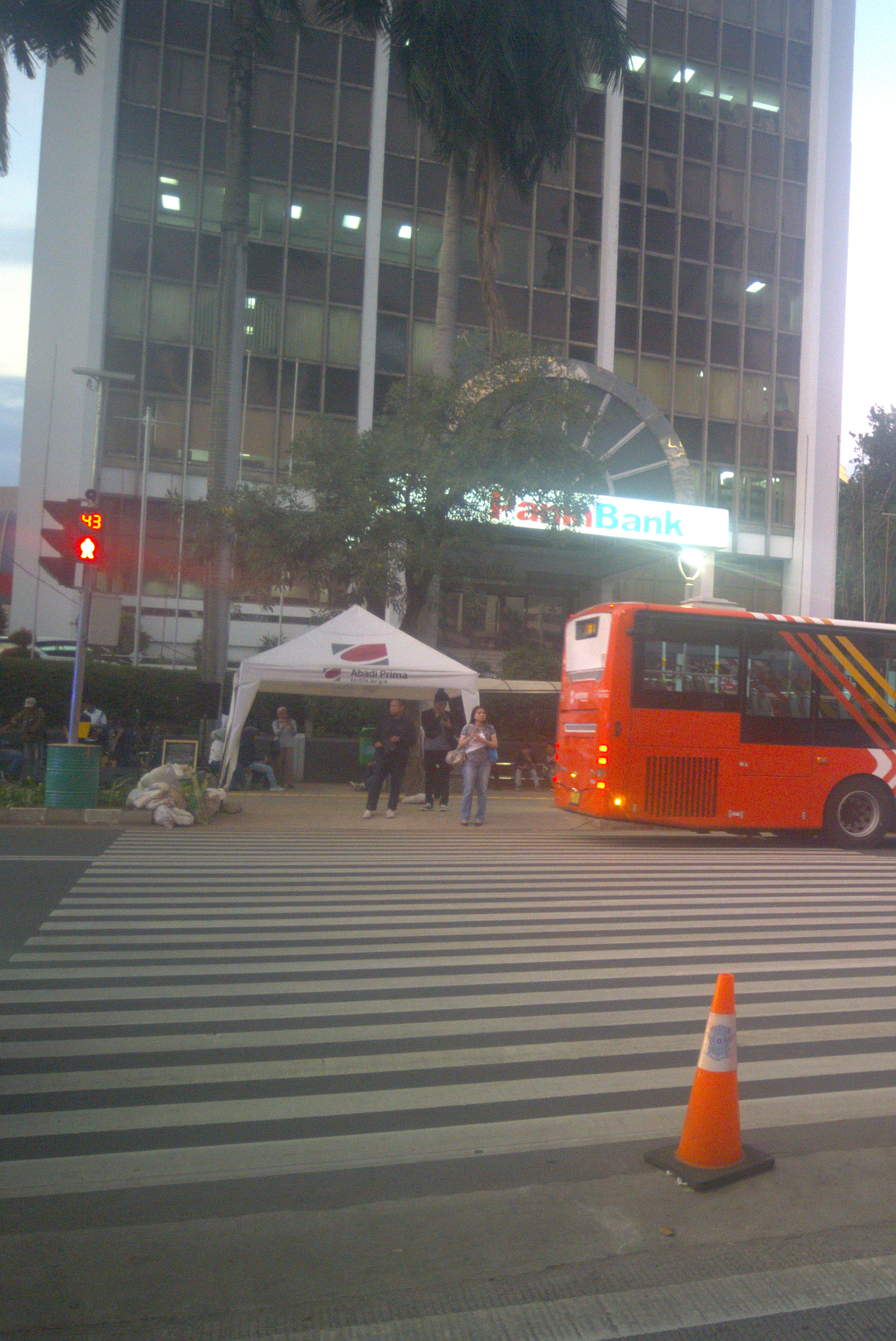
Pelican crossing in Senayan, Jakarta, Indonesia.

=== Decommissioning ===
Statutory authority for pelican crossings was removed in the 2016 update of the Traffic Signs Regulations and General Directions. After 22 October 2016, no new pelican crossings can be installed on public highways in the UK, except work in progress where there was a six-month saving. Puffin crossings are to be installed instead.

== Characteristics ==
Additionally, a pelican crossing, as distinct from a puffin crossing, has the special feature that while the green man flashes to indicate that pedestrians may continue crossing but may not start to cross, the red light changes to an amber flashing light permitting cars to pass if there are no further pedestrians. This reduces the delay to traffic.

Under UK law, pelican crossings that go straight across the road are defined as a single crossing, even when there is a central island. Therefore, traffic in both directions must wait until pedestrians have finished crossing and the signal is green or flashing amber. This rule is different from similar standard pedestrian crossings where each portion of the crossing is treated as a separate crossing. However, at installations where the crossings that cross each carriageway are separate crossings, the crossing is staggered.

=== Pedex crossing ===
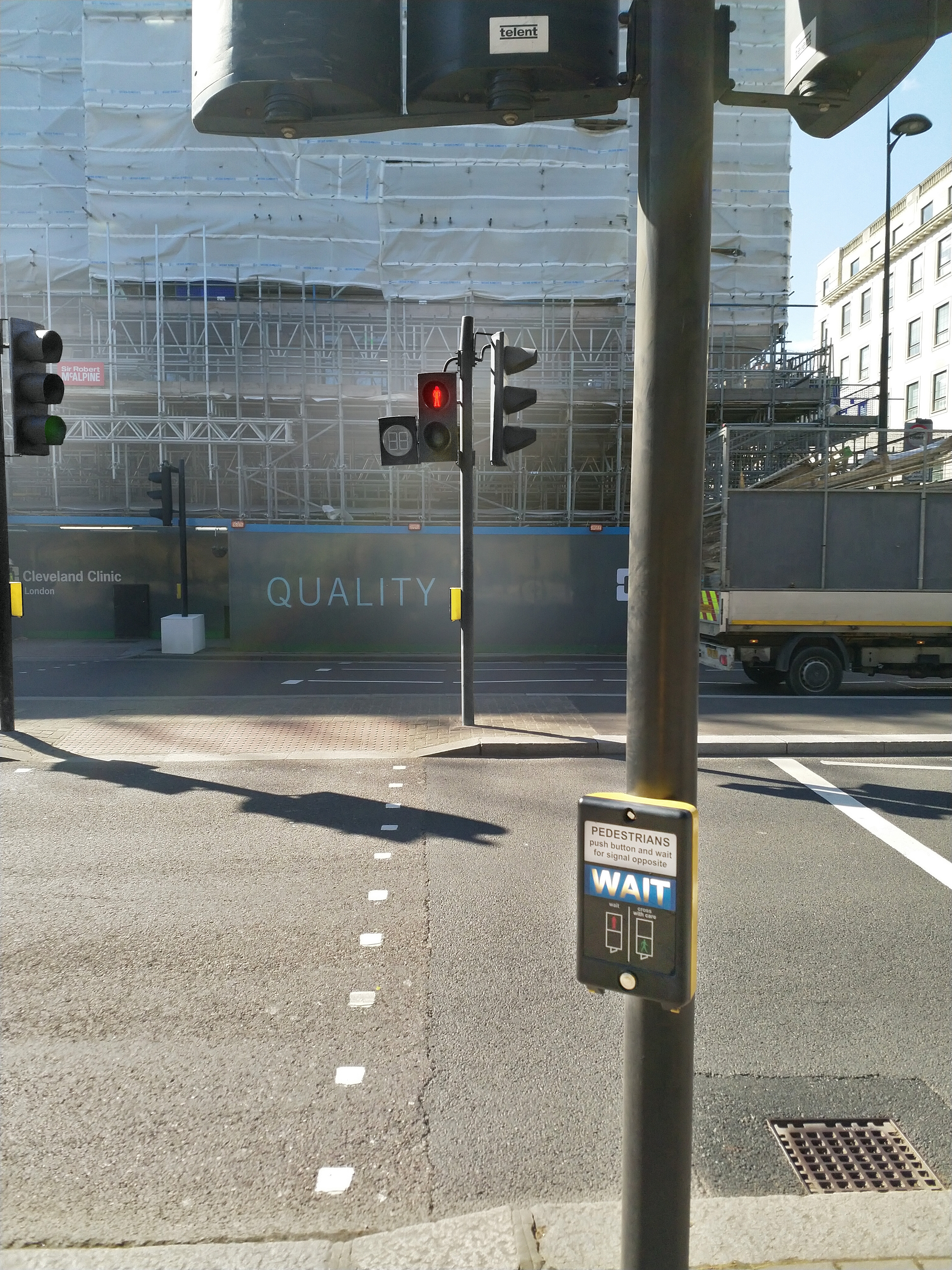
A pedex crossing in London in 2021.

A pedex crossing could be considered a variant of the pelican crossing and is Transport for London's preferred option for new crossings. The main distinguishing feature is an amber countdown timer and no flashing green man/flashing amber phase, indicating the number of seconds to the next red man in place, to the left or the right of the green man signal. Additionally, the pedex crossing has sensors like a puffin crossing, to hold the traffic until the crossing is clear, that are sometimes used instead of the countdown timer.

== See also ==
- Pedestrian crossings in the United Kingdom
- Pedestrian scramble
- Pegasus crossing
- Toucan crossing
