= Puffin crossing =

Type of pedestrian crossing in the United Kingdom

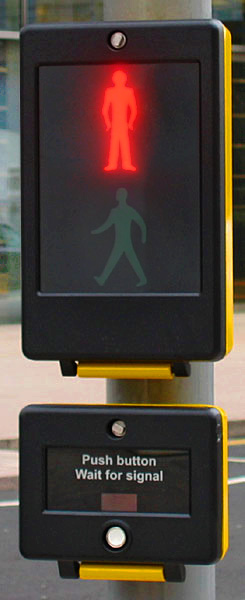
A puffin crossing control panel

A puffin crossing (its name derived from the phrase "pedestrian user-friendly intelligent") is a type of pedestrian crossing in use in the United Kingdom.

The design is distinct from the older pelican crossing in that the lights signalling to the pedestrians are on the same side of the road as the pedestrian, rather than across the road. From 2016, pelican crossings began to be phased out in the United Kingdom, to be replaced with puffin crossings.

They have two sensors on top of the traffic lights (pedestrian crossing detector; PCD, and pedestrian kerb detector; PKD). These sensors detect if pedestrians are crossing slowly and can hold the red traffic light longer if needed. Should a pedestrian walk off after pressing the button, the PKD will cancel the request, making the lights more efficient.

== Function ==
Unlike the older pelican crossing designs, where the pedestrian signal lights are mounted on the opposite side of the road, the puffin crossing mounts them at the near road side, set diagonally to the road edge. This allows the pedestrian to monitor passing traffic while waiting for the signal to cross. A second reason for the design is that having the lights closer to the user assists visually impaired people who could have difficulty viewing the signal from across the carriageway.

Some push-button units (the lower box in the image) are also fitted with a tactile knob under the unit which rotates when the user may cross. This feature is to assist visually impaired people who struggle to see the light change.

After a request to cross (by button press), a kerb-side detector monitors the pedestrian's presence at the crossing. Should the pedestrian cross prematurely, walk away from the crossing, or wait outside the detection area, their request to cross could be automatically cancelled, lest traffic be halted unnecessarily. An on-crossing detector ensures that the signal for vehicles remains red until pedestrians have finished crossing (within practical limits). Unlike the pelican crossing, there is no transitional "flashing" phase.

The pedestrian phase will start at the moment all three of these conditions are fulfilled:

- the pedestrian push button has been pressed since the end of the last pedestrian phase
- the "Maximum Traffic Green Timer" has expired
- the detectors indicate that a pedestrian is still waiting to cross

The "Maximum Traffic Green Timer" is started either when the pedestrian push button is pressed or when the traffic signals first turn green after the previous pedestrian phase. The latter arrangement is termed the "pre-timed Maximum Facility".

=== Concerns ===
Concerns have been expressed that puffin crossings may be less safe than pelican crossings due to the nearside indicator not being visible while crossing, and being at a different focal length, reducing traffic awareness. The indicator box itself also blocks the view of the road completely for shorter pedestrians due to being installed at head height. However, a 2005 study commissioned by the DfT found that Puffins were safer than Pelican crossings with fewer pedestrian accidents and fewer involving cars. The executive director for the Parliamentary Advisory Council for Transport Safety said that using too many different kinds of crossings in a particular area can lead to confusion among pedestrians.

In 2014, Transport for London announced that they would stop installing puffins, saying that "Pedestrians have previously indicated to us that they dislike the uncertainty of not knowing whether the 'green man' is still lit once they have started crossing, which happens with nearside signals." Birmingham City Council also said that year that they would not be installing low level indicators at busy city centre crossings, expressing concern that the pedestrian indicator could be obscured by crowds.
