= 2023 in the Caribbean =

The following lists events that happened during 2023 in the Caribbean.

== Sovereign states ==
=== Cuba ===
(Cuba)

- First Secretary of the Central Committee of the Communist Party of Cuba: Miguel Díaz-Canel (since 19 April 2021)
- President of Cuba: Miguel Díaz-Canel (since 2019)
  - Vice-president: Salvador Valdés Mesa (since 2019)
- Prime Minister: Manuel Marrero Cruz (since 2019)

=== Dominica ===
(Dominica)

- President: Charles Savarin (2013-2023); Sylvanie Burton (2 October onwards)
- Prime Minister: Roosevelt Skerrit (since August 8, 2004)

=== Dominican Republic ===
(Dominican Republic)

- President of the Dominican Republic: Luis Abinader (starting 2020)
- Vice-president Raquel Peña de Antuña (starting 2020)

=== Haiti ===
(Haiti)

- President of Haiti: Ariel Henry (since 2021)
- Acting Prime Minister: Ariel Henry (since 2021)

=== Trinidad and Tobago ===
(Trinidad and Tobago)

- President of Trinidad and Tobago: Paula-Mae Weekes (until 20 March); Christine Kangaloo onwards
- Prime minister of Trinidad and Tobago: Keith Rowley (since 2015)

== Commonwealth Realms ==
(United Kingdom) Monarch: Charles III

=== Antigua and Barbuda ===
(Antigua and Barbuda)

- Governor-General of Antigua and Barbuda: Rodney Williams (since 2014)
- Prime Minister: Gaston Browne (since 2014)

=== The Bahamas ===
The Bahamas are in the Atlantic Ocean and are part of the West Indies, not part of the Caribbean, although the United Nations groups them with the Caribbean

=== Barbados ===
Barbados became independent from the United Kingdom in 1966

- President of Barbados: Sandra Mason (from November 30, 2021)
- Prime minister of Barbados: Mia Mottley (since 2018)

=== Grenada ===
(Grenada)

- Governor-General of Grenada: Cécile La Grenade (since 2013)
- Prime Minister: Dickon Mitchell

=== Jamaica ===
Jamaica became independent in 1962

- Governor-General of Jamaica: Patrick Allen (since 2009)
- Prime Minister of Jamaica: Andrew Holness (since 2016)

=== Saint Kitts and Nevis ===
(Saint Kitts and Nevis)

- Governor-General of Saint Kitts and Nevis: Tapley Seaton (2015–2023); Marcella Liburd (2023–present)
- Prime Minister: Terrance Drew (2022–present)

=== Saint Lucia ===
(Saint Lucia)

- Governor-General of Saint Lucia: Errol Charles (acting since 2021)
- Prime Minister: Philip J. Pierre (since 2021)

=== Saint Vincent and the Grenadines ===
(Saint Vincent and the Grenadines)

- Governor-General of Saint Vincent and the Grenadines: Susan Dougan (since 2019)
- Prime Minister: Ralph Gonsalves (since March 28, 2001)

== Dependencies ==
=== British overseas territories ===
(United Kingdom) Head of the Commonwealth: Charles III (2022–present)

==== Anguilla ====
(Anguilla)

- Governor of Anguilla: Dileeni Daniel-Selvaratnam (until 10 September); Julia Crouch onwards
- Premier of Anguilla: Ellis Webster (since 2020)

==== Bermuda ====
Bermuda is located in the Atlantic Ocean and is included in the UN geoscheme for North America.

- Governor of Bermuda: Rena Lalgie (2020–2025)
- Premier: Edward David Burt (since 2017)

==== British Virgin Islands ====
(British Virgin Islands)

- Governor of the Virgin Islands: John Rankin (2021–2024)
  - Deputy Governor of the British Virgin Islands: David Archer
- Premier: Natalio Wheatley (2022–present)

==== Cayman Islands ====
(Cayman Islands)

- Governor of the Cayman Islands: Martyn Roper (until 21 April 2023); Jane Owen onwards
- Premier: Wayne Panton (until 15 November); Julianna O'Connor-Connolly

==== Montserrat ====
(Montserrat)

- Governor of Montserrat:
  - Sarah Tucker (since 2022)
- Premier: Easton Taylor-Farrell (since 2019)

==== Turks and Caicos Islands ====
Turks and Caicos Islands are located in the Atlantic Ocean, although the United Nations groups them with the Caribbean

- Governor Nigel Dakin (since 2019)
- Premier:
  - Sharlene Cartwright-Robinson (until February 20)
  - Washington Misick (starting February 20)

=== France ===
(France)

- President: Emmanuel Macron (since 2017)
- Prime Minister:
  - Jean Castex (since 2020)
  - Elisabeth Borne (since 2022)

==== Guadeloupe ====
- Governor: Philippe Gustin (since 2018)

==== Martinique ====
- President of the Assembly of Martinique:Claude Lise (since 2015)

==== Saint Barthélemy ====
- President of Territorial Council: Xavier Lédée (since April 3, 2022)

==== Saint Martin ====
- Prefect Anne Laubies (since 2015)
- President of Territorial Council Louis Mussington (since 2022)
  - First Vice President Alain Richardson (since 2022)

=== Kingdom of the Netherlands ===
(Netherlands) Monarch: King Willem-Alexander (since April 30, 2013)

==== Aruba ====
(Aruba)

- Governor of Aruba: Alfonso Boekhoudt (since 2017)
- Prime Minister: Evelyn Wever-Croes (since 2018)

==== Curaçao ====
(Curaçao)

- Governor of Curaçao: Lucille George-Wout (since 2013)
- Prime Minister: Gilmar Pisas (since 2021)

==== Sint Maarten ====
Sint Maarten became a self-governing constituent Kingdom of the Netherlands in October 2010.

- Governor of Sint Maarten:
  - Eugene Holiday (since 2010)
  - Ajamu Baly (since 2022)
- Interim Prime Minister of Sint Maarten: Silveria Jacobs (since 2020)

==== Caribbean Netherlands ====
Bonaire, Sint Eustatius, and (Saba (island)) Saba

=== United States ===
The (United States)

- President
  - Joe Biden
- Vice-president
  - Kamala Harris (starting January 20)

==== Puerto Rico ====
(Puerto Rico)

- Governor of Puerto Rico
  - Pedro Pierluisi (starting January 2)
- Resident Commissioner of Puerto Rico: Jenniffer González (since 2017)

==== United States Virgin Islands ====
(United States Virgin Islands)

- Governor: Albert Bryan (since 2019)
  - Lt. Governor: Tregenza Roach (since 2019)

== Scheduled and programmed events ==
=== Elections ===
- 18 January: 2023 Antiguan and Barbudan general election
- 26 March: 2023 Cuban parliamentary election
- 14 August: 2023 Trinidadian local elections

=== Holidays ===
==== January and February ====
- January 1 –New Year's Day
  - Triumph of the Revolution, Cuba
  - Independence Day, Haiti (from France, 1804)
- January 2
  - Victory Day, Cuba
  - Ancestry Day, Haiti
  - Day after New Year's, Saint Lucia
- January 6 – Epiphany, Christian and children's holiday
- January 11 – Majority Rule Day, the Bahamas
- January 18 – Martin Luther King Jr. Day, official holiday in Puerto Rico and United States Virgin Islands
- January 21
  - Errol Barrow Day, Barbados
  - Our Lady of High Grace, holiday in the Dominican Republic
- January 25 – Juan Pablo Duarte′s Birthday, Dominican Republic
- February 8 – Independence Day (Grenada) (from the UK, 1974)
- February 15 – Heroes′ Day, Puerto Rico; President's Day, Puerto Rico and U.S. Virgin Islands
- February 15–16 — Carnival Monday and Tuesday.
- February 22 – Independence Day, Saint Lucia (from the UK, 1979)
- February 27 – Independence Day, Dominican Republic (from Haiti, 1844)

==== March and April ====
- March 2 – American Citizenship Day, Puerto Rico
- March 15 – Joseph Chatoyer Day, Saint Vincent and the Grenadines
- March 22 – Emancipation Day, Puerto Rico
- March 31 – Transfer Day, U.S. Virgin Islands.
- April 2 – Good Friday, Christian feast celebrated in Cuba, Dominica,
- April 5 – Easter Monday, Christian holiday celebrated in Dominica,
- April 28 – Barbadian National Heroes Day, Barbados

==== May and June ====
- May 1/3 – Labour Day and International Workers' Day
  - Labour and Agriculture Day, Haiti
- May 18 – Flag and Universities Day, Haiti
- May 20 – Independence Day (from the United States, 1902), celebrated by Cuban exiles.
- May 24
  - Whit Monday, Christian holiday celebrated in Dominica,
  - Labour Day (Jamaica)
- May 31 – Memorial Day, Puerto Rico and U.S. Virgin Islands
- June 3 – Feast of Corpus Christi, celebrated in Dominican Republic, public holiday in Grenada, Haiti Saint Lucia,
- June 4 – Randol Fawkes-Labour Day, the Bahamas

==== July and August ====
- July 3 – Emancipation Day, U.S. Virgin Islands
- July 4 – Independence of the United States, celebrated in Puerto Rico and U.S. Virgin Islands
- July 5–6 – Vincy Mas (Carnival), Saint Vincent and the Grenadines
- July 10 – Independence Day, the Bahamas (from the UK, 1973)
- July 14 – Bastille Day, celebrated in French territories.
- July 25–27 – Commemoration of the Assault on the Moncada Barracks, Cuba
- August 2
  - Emancipation Day, Dominica, the Bahamas, Grenada, Jamaica, Saint Vincent and the Grenadines
  - Kadooment Day, Barbados
- August 3
  - Emancipation Day, Barbados
  - Culturama Day, Saint Kitts and Nevis
- August 6 – Independence Day (Jamaica) (from the UK, 1962)
- August 15 – Assumption of Mary, Roman Catholic feast celebrated in Haiti
- August 16 – Restoration Day, Dominican Republic

==== September and October ====
- September 6 – Labor Day, Puerto Rico and U.S. Virgin Islands
- September 16 – Heroes' Day, Saint Kitts and Nevis
- September 20 – Independence Day, Saint Kitts and Nevis (from the UK, 1973)
- September 24 – Feast of María de las Mercedes (English: Our Lady of Mercy), celebrated in Dominican Republic
- October 4 – Thanksgiving Day, Saint Lucia
- October 10 – Independence Day (from Spain, 1868), Cuba
- October 11
  - National Heroes' Day, the Bahamas,
  - Columbus Day, Puerto Rico and U.S. Virgin Islands
- October 17 – Jean-Jacques Dessalines Day, Haiti
- October 18 – Heroes' Day, Jamaica
- October 25 – Thanksgiving Day, Grenada
- October 27 – Independence Day, Saint Vincent and the Grenadines (from the UK, 1979)

==== November and December ====
- November 1
  - Independence Day, Antigua and Barbuda (from the UK, 1981)
  - D. Hamilton Jackson Day, U.S. Virgin Islands
- All Saints' Day, Roman Catholic and Vodou holiday in Haiti
- All Souls' Day, Roman Catholic and Vodou holiday in Haiti
- November 3 – Independence Day, Dominica (from the UK, 1978)
- November 4 – National Day of Community Service, Dominica
- November 5 – Constitution Day, Dominican Republic
- November 11 – Veterans Day, Puerto Rico and U.S. Virgin Islands
- November 18 – Battle of Vertières Day, Haiti
- November 19 – Discovery Day, Puerto Rico
- November 25 – Thanksgiving (United States), celebrated in Puerto Rico and U.S. Virgin Islands
- November 30 – Republic Day, Barbados
- December 9 – V.C. Bird Day, Antigua and Barbuda
- December 13 – National Day, Saint Lucia (feast of Saint Lucy)
- December 25/26/27 – Christmas Day
- December 26/27/28 – Boxing Day, celebrated in the Commonwealth and British Dependencies.

== Sports ==
- 2023 Caribbean Premier League

== See also ==
- 2020s
- 2023 in politics and government
- 2020s in political history
- 2023 Atlantic hurricane season
- Caribbean Community
- List of state leaders in the Caribbean in 2023
- Organization of American States
