= List of countries by number of public holidays =

The following table is a list of countries by number of public holidays excluding non-regular special holidays. Nepal has the highest number of public holidays in the world with 35 annually. Also, Nepal has a 5 day working schedule, with weekend holidays on Saturdays and Sundays.

Country/Region	Minimum number of public holidays	Maximum number of public holidays	Notes
Albania	13	14	
Argentina	16	19	Depending on state and workplace.
Australia	9	13	Depending on state.
Austria	13	18	Depending on state and workplace.
Bangladesh	22	22	
Belgium	10	10	
Barbados	11	12	
Bhutan	19	23	
Brazil	9	12	Including bank holidays.
Bulgaria	12	12	
Cambodia	21	21	
Canada	10	11	Depending on jurisdiction.
Cayman Islands	12	12	
Chile	16	17	Depending on state and workplace.
China	13	13	
Colombia	19	19	
Croatia	14	14	
Cyprus	14	14	
Czechia	13	13	
Denmark	10	10	
Dominican Republic	12	12	
Ecuador	11	11	Depending on city.
Egypt	12	12	
Estonia	12	12	
Fiji	11	23	
Finland	13	13	
France	11	13	13 only in Alsace and Moselle
Germany	10	13	Depending on state.
Ghana	13	13	
Greece	12	12	
Hong Kong	17	17	
Hungary	11	13	
Iceland	16	16	
India	17	21	Depending on state.
Indonesia	17	19	Polling day is declared as a public holiday during years with General Elections or Local Elections
Iran	26	26	
Ireland	10	10	
Israel	11	11	
Italy	12	12	
Japan	16	16	
Kazakhstan	16	16	
Kenya	13	13	
Kosovo	11	11	
Latvia	13	13	
Lebanon	19	19	
Liechtenstein	20	22	
Lithuania	15	15	
Luxembourg	11	11	
Macau	20	20	
Malaysia	11	67	Depending on the state. Some holidays take place for two days.
Mexico	7	8	Swearing in of new president every 6 years
Mongolia	16	16	
Morocco	16	16	
Myanmar	25	26	
Nepal	35	43+	
Netherlands	7	9	
New Zealand	12	12	
Nigeria	12	12	
Norway	12	12	
Malta	14	14	
Pakistan	15	16	
Peru	14	14	
Philippines	18	18	
Poland	14	14	
Portugal	13	15	depending on the region
Romania	15	15	
Russia	14	14	
Rwanda	14	14	
Saint Lucia	12	12	
Serbia	9	9	
Singapore	11	13	Polling day is declared as a public holiday during years with General Elections or Presidential Elections
Slovakia	14	15	
Slovenia	14	14	
South Africa	12	12	
South Korea	17	17	
Spain	12	13	depending on autonomous community
Sri Lanka	25	25	
Sweden	12	12	
Switzerland	9	15	depending on the canton, including holidays falling on a weekend
Taiwan	16	16	
Thailand	16	16	
Tanzania	16	16	
Timor-Leste	18	18	
Trinidad and Tobago	14	14	
Tunisia	12	12	
Turkey	14	14	
Ukraine	11	11	
United Kingdom	8	10	depending on nation, but 8 for England and Wales
United States	6	11	
Uruguay	12	12	
Venezuela	14	14	
Vietnam	6	6	Note: Tet goes for 7 days but is only listed as one holiday
Maldives	19	22	

== See also ==
- List of holidays by country - A list of holidays sorted by country
- List of minimum annual leave by country
