= List of national independence days =

Independence-related National Day Unification- or revolution-related national day Other reasons for national day No official National Day

An Independence Day is an annual event commemorating the anniversary of a nation's independence or statehood, usually after ceasing to be a group or part of another nation or state, or after the end of a military occupation, or after a major change in government. Many countries commemorate their independence from a colonial empire.

Not all countries class independence as a national holiday. Many, such as Australia, Canada, China, Denmark, France, Japan, New Zealand, Ireland, Luxembourg, Saudi Arabia, South Africa, Taiwan, Thailand and Turkey mark other dates of significance.

== List ==
List of independence days of countries around the world
Country	Event commemorated	Date of holiday	Year of event	Independence Gained From	Notes
Afghanistan	Independence Day	19 August (De jure)	1919	United Kingdom	Anglo-Afghan Treaty of 1919 or Treaty of Rawalpindi, an armistice between the United Kingdom and Afghanistan during the Third Anglo-Afghan War.
Afghanistan	Liberation Day	15 February	1989	Soviet Union	Soviet withdrawal from Afghanistan.
Albania	Independence Day	28 November	1912	Ottoman Empire	Albanian Declaration of Independence. During the First Balkan War, risked by separation after war, Ismail Qemali, the first Albanian leader, declared independence in a speech only 5 minutes long. This became the Second November, after the First November, when Skanderbeg raised the Albanian flag in Krujë.
Algeria	Independence Day	5 July	1962	France	Algeria gained independence following the Algerian War and the Algerian independence referendum. France officially recognized independent Algeria on 3 July, but the Independence Day is celebrated on 5 July, the day of the fall of Algiers in 1830 and the beginning of French Algeria.
Angola	Independence Day	11 November	1975	Portugal	The Alvor Agreement, signed on 15 January 1975, granted Angola independence from Portugal on 11 November, ending the Angolan War of Independence.
Antigua and Barbuda	Independence Day	1 November	1981	United Kingdom	The effective date of the Antigua Termination of Association Order passed by the Parliament of the United Kingdom in July.
Argentina	Independence Day	9 July	1816	Spain	Argentine Declaration of Independence.
Armenia	Republic Day	28 May	1918	Russian Soviet Federative Socialist Republic	Declaration of Independence of Armenia (1918).
Armenia	Independence Day	21 September	1991	Soviet Union	1991 Armenian independence referendum.
Azerbaijan	Independence Day	28 May	1918	Russian Soviet Federative Socialist Republic	Declaration of Independence of Azerbaijan.
Azerbaijan	Day of Restoration of Independence	18 October	1991	Soviet Union	Adoption of the constitutional act "On the State Independence of the Republic of Azerbaijan".
The Bahamas	Independence Day	10 July	1973	United Kingdom	Effective date of The Bahamas Independence Order 1973.
Bahrain	Independence Day	16 December	1971	United Kingdom	Ascension of Isa bin Salman Al Khalifa to the throne.
Bangladesh	Independence and National Day	26 March	1971	Pakistan	Proclamation of Bangladeshi Independence.
Bangladesh	Victory Day	16 December	1971	Pakistan	Victory over Pakistan Armed Forces in the Bangladesh Liberation War.
Barbados	Independence Day	30 November	1966	United Kingdom	Effective date of the Barbados Independence Act 1966. Also the anniversary of the formal proclamation of Barbados as a Republic in the Commonwealth in 2021.
Belarus	Independence Day	3 July	1944	Germany	The liberation of Minsk after several years of German occupation in 1944. Two other independence days – 25 March (proclamation of the Belarusian People's Republic in 1918) and 27 July (independence from the Soviet Union in 1990) – are commemorated unofficially, mainly by the Belarusian diaspora and the anti-Lukashenko opposition.
Belgium	National Day	21 July	1831	Netherlands	Ascension of Leopold of Saxe-Coburg-Saalfeld to the throne.
Belize	Independence Day	21 September	1981	United Kingdom	Effective day of the Belize Act 1981.
Benin	Independence Day	1 August	1960	France	Effective date of the agreement with France signed on 11 July creating the independent Republic of Dahomey.
Bolivia	Independence Day	6 August	1825	Spain	Bolivian Declaration of Independence.
Bosnia and Herzegovina	Independence Day	1 March	1992	Yugoslavia	1992 Bosnian independence referendum.
Botswana	Independence Day	30 September	1966	United Kingdom	Effective date of the Botswana Independence Act 1966.
Brazil	Independence Day	7 September	1822	Portugal	Declaration of independence by Pedro I of Brazil (see Independence of Brazil).
Brunei	National Day	23 February	1984	United Kingdom	Brunei gained full independence effective 1 January 1984 under the Treaty of Friendship and Co-operation of 7 January 1979 between United Kingdom and Brunei. However, the celebrations of the first National Day were delayed until 23 February and that day continues to be celebrated since.
Bulgaria	Liberation Day	3 March	1878	Ottoman Empire	Treaty of San Stefano which created the autonomous Principality of Bulgaria.
Bulgaria	Independence Day	22 September	1908	Ottoman Empire	Bulgarian Declaration of Independence.
Burkina Faso	Proclamation of Independence Day	11 December	1958	France	Effective date when French Upper Volta became an autonomous republic in the French Community.
Burkina Faso	Independence Day	5 August	1960	France	Effective date of the agreement with France signed on 11 July and creation of the independent Republic of Upper Volta.
Burundi	Independence Day	1 July	1962	Belgium	Effective date of the United Nations General Assembly Resolution 1746 terminating the Ruanda-Urundi Trusteeship.
Cambodia	Independence Day	9 November	1953	France	Ceremony transferring military from French to Cambodian officials based on a military hand-over agreement reached on 17 October 1953.
Cameroon	National Day	20 May	1972	United Kingdom; France	Cameroon gained independence on 1 January 1960, but does not celebrate that date. Instead, it celebrates the National Day on 20 May commemorating the 1972 Cameroonian constitutional referendum.
Canada	Canada Day	1 July	1867	United Kingdom	Canada Day on 1 July commemorates the establishment of the Dominion of Canada in 1867.
Cape Verde	Independence Day	5 July	1975	Portugal	Effective date of the Agreement Between Portugal and Partido Africano para a Independência da Guiné e Cabo Verde (PAIGC) signed on 18 December 1974.
Central African Republic	National Day	1 December	1958	France	Effective date when Central African Republic became an autonomous republic of the French Community.
Central African Republic	Independence Day	13 August	1960	France	Effective date of the agreement with France signed on 12 July.
Chad	Republic Day	28 November	1958	France	Effective date when Chad became an autonomous republic in the French Community.
Chad	Independence Day	11 August	1960	France	Effective date of the agreement with France signed on 12 July.
Chile	Independence Day	18 September	1810	Spain	Establishment of the Government Junta of Chile. The following day, 19 September, is celebrated as the Army Day. The two holidays collectively are known as Fiestas Patrias.
Colombia	Independence Day	20 July	1810	Spain	Creation of the autonomous Supreme Government Junta of Santa Fe in New Granada through an act of the City Council of Bogotá, the capital of New Granada. Traditionally regarded as the Colombian Declaration of Independence.
Colombia	Independence of Cartagena	11 November	1811	Spain	The colonial Province of Cartagena declares full independence from Spain and from any other foreign power, thus being one of the first full declarations of independence in what is modern-day Colombia.
Colombia	Battle of Boyacá	07 August	1819	Spain	Decisive battle against Spain that would allow the de facto establishment of the Republic of Colombia by allowing the independentist forces to capture Bogotá, the capital of the Viceroyalty of New Granada.
Comoros	Independence Day	6 July	1975	France	Unilateral declaration of independence by the Chamber of Deputies of Comoros following the 1974 Comorian independence referendum.
Congo, Democratic Republic of the	Independence Day	30 June	1960	Belgium	Effective date of the Treaty of Friendship, Assistance and Co-operation between Belgium and the Congo concluded on 29 June 1960.
Congo, Republic of the	Republic Day	28 November	1958	France	Effective date when Congo became an autonomous republic in the French Community.
Congo, Republic of the	Independence Day	15 August	1960	France	Congo gains full independence from France.
Costa Rica	Independence Day	15 September	1821	Spain	Act of Independence of Central America.
Croatia	National Day	30 May	1990	Yugoslavia	First session of the Croatian Parliament following the 1990 Croatian parliamentary election. 8 October (when the parliament adopted a decision to sever constitutional relations with Yugoslavia in 1991) and 25 June (when the parliament voted for independence in 1991) were also celebrated as independence days. After the 2019 changes to the law on public holidays, 8 October is the Parliament Day and 25 June is the Independence Day, but they are memorial days and not public holidays.
Cuba	Independence Day	10 October	1868	Spain	Call to rebellion (known as Grito de Yara) by sugar planter Carlos Manuel de Cespedes that led to the Ten Years' War for independence.
Cuba	Independence Day	10 December	1898	Spain	Spain cedes Cuba to the United States as a result of the Treaty of Paris in 1898, which marked the end of the Spanish–American War.
Cuba	Independence Day	20 May	1902	United States	Independence of Cuba from the United States. However, Cuba remained under direct U.S. influence until 1934 as a result of the Platt Amendment.
Cyprus	Independence Day	1 October	1960	United Kingdom	Effective date of the London-Zürich Agreements was 16 August 1960, but the public holiday was moved to 1 October to avoid summer heat and tourist season.
Czech Republic	Independence Day	28 October	1918	Austria-Hungary	Independence declaration by the Czechoslovak National Council. Official day of independence of the Czech Republic
Czech Republic	Restoration Day	1 January	1993	Czechoslovakia	Effective date of the Peaceful Dissolution of Czechoslovakia into Czech Republic and Slovakia. Establishment of the first Czech state since the Jagiellonian Kingdom of Bohemia.
Djibouti	Independence Day	27 June	1977	France	Independence from France following a successful independence referendum held in May 1977.
Dominica	Independence Day	3 November	1978	United Kingdom	Independence from the United Kingdom following the creation of the Dominican constitution.
Dominican Republic	Independence Day	1 December	1821	Spain	Independence from Spain in December 1821.
Dominican Republic	Independence Day	27 February	1844	Haiti	Independence re-declared from Haiti in 1844, after a 22-year occupation. Start of the Dominican War of Independence.
Dominican Republic	Restoration Day	16 August	1863	Spain	Day of Grito del Capotillo on 16 August 1863. Independence officially restored from Spain on 11 July 1865, after victory in the Dominican Restoration War.
Ecuador	Independence Day	10 August	1809	Spain	Proclaimed independence on 10 August 1809, but failed with the execution of all the conspirators of the movement on 2 August 1810.
Egypt	Revolution Day	23 July	1952	United Kingdom	The Egyptian Revolution of 1952 abolished the Kingdom of Egypt, ended British influence in the country, and established an independent republic.
El Salvador	Independence Day	15 September	1821	Spain	Act of Independence of Central America.
Equatorial Guinea	Independence Day	12 October	1968	Spain	Independence from Spain following the country's only free and fair election to date in September 1968.
Eritrea	Independence Day	24 May	1991	Ethiopia	Eritrean War of Independence.
Estonia	Independence Day	24 February	1918	Russian Soviet Federative Socialist Republic; Germany	Estonian Declaration of Independence.
Estonia	Day of Restoration of Independence	20 August	1991	Soviet Union	Estonian Restoration of Independence.
Eswatini	Independence Day (Somhlolo Day)	6 September	1968	United Kingdom	Commemorates independence. Also called Somhlolo Day or Subhuza Day, after the 19th-century leader Sobhuza I.
Fiji	Fiji Day	10 October	1970	United Kingdom	Instruments of Independence
Finland	Independence Day	6 December	1917	Russian Soviet Federative Socialist Republic	Finnish Declaration of Independence
Gabon	Independence Day	16–17 August	1960	France	Effective date of the agreement with France signed on 15 July.
The Gambia	Independence Day	18 February	1965	United Kingdom	Effective date of the Gambia Independence Act 1964.
Georgia	Independence Day	26 May	1918	Russian Soviet Federative Socialist Republic	Day of the proclamation of the Democratic Republic of Georgia in 1918.
Georgia	National Unity Day	9 April	1991	Soviet Union	Commemoration of both the April 9 tragedy 1989 (also known as Tbilisi Massacre, Tbilisi tragedy) when on Rustaveli Avenue, in Tbilisi an anti-Soviet demonstration was dispersed by the Soviet Army, resulting in 20 deaths and hundreds of injuries, as well as the declaration of independence by Zviad Gamsakhurdia following an independence referendum in March 1991.
Germany	German Unity Day	3 October	1990	West Germany; East Germany	It commemorates German reunification in 1990 when the Federal Republic of Germany (West Germany) and the German Democratic Republic (East Germany) were unified.
Ghana	Independence Day	6 March	1957	United Kingdom	On Wednesday, 6 March 1957, when Kwame Nkrumah, the inaugural Prime Minister of Ghana, declared to the people of Ghana about their freedom, he added that, "the African People are capable of managing their own affairs and Ghana our beloved country is free forever." Ghana was the first country in Sub-Saharan Africa to achieve its independence from European colonial rule.
Greece	Independence Day	25 March	1821	Ottoman Empire	Declaration of independence 1821. Start of the Greek War of Independence.
Grenada	Independence Day	7 February	1974	United Kingdom	Accession of Sir Eric Gairy as the inaugural Prime Minister of Grenada.
Guatemala	Independence Day	15 September	1821	Spain	Act of Independence of Central America.
Guinea	Independence Day	2 October	1958	France	Withdrawal of French authority after the collapse of the Fourth Republic and establishment of the Fifth Republic that led to an overwhelming vote for independence in a referendum in September 1958.
Guinea-Bissau	Independence Day	24 September	1973	Portugal	Declaration of independence in September 1973 during the country's war of liberation, although it wouldn't be formally recognized by Portugal until a year later on 10 September 1974.
Guyana	Independence Day	26 May	1966	United Kingdom	The Guyana Independence Act came into effect.
Haiti	Independence Day	1 January	1804	France	Haitian Declaration of Independence.
Honduras	Independence Day	15 September	1821	Spain	Act of Independence of Central America.
Iceland	National Day	17 June	1944	Denmark	Effective date of the dissolution of the Danish–Icelandic Act of Union following the 1944 Icelandic constitutional referendum.
India	Independence Day	15 August	1947	United Kingdom	Effective date of the Indian Independence Act 1947. (Note: Independence was at midnight on the 14/15 August, Pakistan chose to celebrate independence on the 14th September and India on the 10th September.)
Indonesia	Independence Day	17 August	1945	Japan; Netherlands	Proclamation of Indonesian Independence.
Iraq	Independence Day	3 October	1932	United Kingdom	Iraq joined the League of Nations after gaining formal independence.
Israel	Independence Day	Iyar 5 (On or between 15 April and 15 May, depending on the Hebrew calendar).	1948	United Kingdom (League of Nations) British Mandate for Palestine	Israeli Declaration of Independence on 14 May 1948 (5 Iyar 5708 in the Hebrew calendar). Yom Ha'atzmaut is celebrated on the Tuesday, Wednesday or Thursday nearest to 5 Iyar, so it occurs between 3 and 6 Iyar each year; this means that the holiday can fall any time between and including 15 April and 15 May, according to the Gregorian calendar.
Italy	Anniversary of the Unification	17 March	1861	Austrian Empire	The political and social movement that on 17 March 1861 ended in the annexation of various states of the Italian Peninsula and its outlying isles to the Kingdom of Sardinia, resulting in the creation of the Kingdom of Italy. It celebrates the birth of Italy as a modern nation state, which took place following the proclamation of the Kingdom of Italy on 17 March 1861. However, the complete unification of Italy took place only in the following years.
Ivory Coast	Independence Day	7 August	1960	France	Effective date of the agreement with France signed on 11 July.
Jamaica	Independence Day	6 August	1962	United Kingdom	Independence of Jamaica.
Jordan	Independence Day	25 May	1946	United Kingdom; Emirate of Transjordan; Mandate for Palestine	Ascension of Abdullah I of Jordan to the throne.
Kazakhstan	Independence Day	16 December	1991	Soviet Union	The Supreme Soviet of Kazakhstan passed the Constitutional Independence Law of Republic of Kazakhstan, and was the last country to declare independence from the Soviet Union.
Kenya	Madaraka Day	1 June	1963	United Kingdom	Kenya attained internal self rule after being a British colony since 1920.
Kenya	Jamhuri Day	12 December	1963	United Kingdom	Jomo Kenyatta was inaugurated as the first President of Kenya.
Kiribati	National Day	12 July	1979	United Kingdom	Kiribati gained its independence from the United Kingdom, becoming a sovereign state in 1979.
Kosovo	Independence Day	17 February	2008	Serbia	17 February is celebrated as Independence Day in Kosovo, commemorating the declaration of independence from Serbia in 2008, marking a significant milestone in the nation's history.
Kuwait	National Day	25 February	1961	United Kingdom	Independence actually occurred on 19 June 1961, but celebrate on 25 February each year to honor Sheikh Abdullah Al-Salim, who is credited with ending the treaties with Britain and instigating democratic life in Kuwait.
Kyrgyzstan	Independence Day	31 August	1991	Soviet Union	The Supreme Council of Kyrgyzstan adopted a law on the "Declaration on State Independence of the Republic of Kyrgyzstan".
Latvia	Proclamation Day of the Republic of Latvia	18 November	1918	Russian Soviet Federative Socialist Republic; Germany	Proclamation of independence on 18 November 1918. Latvia was part of Russian Empire prior to World War I, but its territory had been ceded to the German Empire in March 1918.
Latvia	Day of Restoration of Independence	4 May	1990	Soviet Union	On the Restoration of Independence of the Republic of Latvia.
Lebanon	Independence Day	22 November	1943	Vichy France	Domestic and international pressure forced France to release the Lebanese prisoners from Rashaya Citadel.
Lesotho	Independence Day	4 October	1966	United Kingdom	Name of the country changed from Basutoland to Lesotho.
Liberia	Independence Day	26 July	1847	American Colonization Society	Liberian Declaration of Independence.
Libya	Independence Day	24 December	1951	United Kingdom; Italy; France	Independence from Italy on 10 February 1947, released from British and French on 24 December 1951.
Liechtenstein	National Day	15 August	1866	German Confederation	Separation of the country from the German Confederation following the Austro-Prussian War.
Lithuania	Statehood Restoration Day	16 February	1918	Russian Soviet Federative Socialist Republic; Germany	Act of Independence of Lithuania.
Lithuania	Day of Restoration of Independence	11 March	1990	Soviet Union	Act of the Re-Establishment of the State of Lithuania.
Madagascar	Independence Day	26 June	1960	France	Separation of the autonomous Malagasy Republic from the French Community.
Malawi	Independence Day	6 July	1964	United Kingdom	Name of the country changed from Nyasaland to Malawi.
Malaysia	Independence Day/National Day	31 August	1957	United Kingdom	Malayan Declaration of Independence.
Malaysia	Malaysia Day	16 September	1963	United Kingdom	Proclamation of Malaysia
Maldives	National Day	1st of Rabi' al-Awwal, 3rd month of Islamic calendar	1573	Portugal	Termination of Portuguese rule in the archipelago following the uprising of Mohamed Thakurufaanu in 1573.
Maldives	Independence Day	26 July	1965	United Kingdom	Independence agreement formalized in Ceylon, signed by Prime Minister Ibrahim Nasir and High Commissioner Sir Michael Walker.
Mali	Independence Day	22 September	1960	France	Dissolution of the Mali Federation following secession of Senegal led to the independence of the Sudanese Republic as the Republic of Mali.
Malta	Independence Day	21 September	1964	United Kingdom	Malta Independence Act.
Marshall Islands	Constitution Day	1 May	1979	United States	Constitution of the Marshall Islands enacted in force.
Mauritania	Independence Day	28 November	1960	France	Effective date of the agreement with France signed on 19 October.
Mauritius	Independence Day	12 March	1968	United Kingdom	Constitution of Mauritius enacted in force.
Mexico	Independence Day; Cry of Dolores	16 September	1810	Spain	Start of the Mexican War of Independence.
Micronesia	Independence Day	3 November	1986	United States	Effective date of the Compact of Free Association.
Moldova	Independence Day	27 August	1991	Soviet Union	Moldovan Declaration of Independence.
Mongolia	Independence Day	29 December	1911	Qing dynasty	Independence declared in 1911 during the Xinhai Revolution. However, Mongolian independence was neither recognized by Qing China nor its successor state, the Republic of China. The newly established Bogd Khanate of Mongolia led by the Bogd Khan lasted for 8 years until it was occupied by the Republic of China in 1919, to regain independence not long after.The Imperial Edict of the Abdication of the Qing Emperor issued in 1912 provided the legal basis for the Republic of China to inherit all Qing territories, including Mongolia. The Republic of China later established de facto control over Mongolia in 1919. Mongolia subsequently re-asserted its independence in 1921. During the years of socialism, the value of this historically important day was ignored, but the law of the State Greate Khural of the Republic of Mongolia on 16 August 2007, made 29 December a public holiday, and later enshrined it into law on 23 December 2011, making it a public holiday, the Day of the Restoration of National Freedom and Independence.
Montenegro	Statehood Day	13 July	1878	Ottoman Empire	Commemorates the day in 1878 on which the Berlin Congress recognized Montenegro as an independent state, as well as also the 1941 uprising against Italian occupation.
Montenegro	Independence Day	21 May	2006	Serbia and Montenegro	2006 Montenegrin independence referendum.
Morocco	Proclamation of Independence Day	11 January	1944	France; Spain	Proclamation of Independence.
Morocco	Independence Day	18 November	1955	France; Spain	Return of Mohammed V of Morocco from exile.
Mozambique	Independence Day	25 June	1975	Portugal	In September 1964 the Mozambique Liberation Front (FRELIMO) began an armed guerilla campaign against the Portuguese. FRELIMO took control of Maputo in April 1974 in a coup. Independence for Mozambique was officially declared a year later on 25 June 1975.
Myanmar	Independence Day	4 January	1948	United Kingdom	Burmese Declaration of Independence.
Namibia	Independence Day	21 March	1990	South Africa	The New York Accords signed in December 1988 guaranteed Namibian independence two years later.
Nauru	Independence Day	31 January	1968	Australia; New Zealand; United Kingdom	Effective date of the Nauru Independence Act 1967. Also marks the date of the return of the Nauruans from Truk island after the Japanese occupation of Nauru during World War II.
Nicaragua	Independence Day	15 September	1821	Spain	Act of Independence of Central America.
Niger	Independence Day	3 August	1960	France	Effective date of the agreement with France signed on 11 July.
Nigeria	Independence Day	1 October	1960	United Kingdom	Nigeria Independence Act 1960.
North Korea	National Liberation Day of Korea	15 August	1945	Japan	Liberation from the Empire of Japan in 1945. See Japanese Occupation of Korea. The Democratic People's Republic of Korea was founded in 1948.
North Macedonia	Republic Day	2 August	1903	Ottoman Empire	Republic Day: Recognition of the establishment of the short-lived Kruševo Republic during the Ilinden Uprising.
North Macedonia	Independence Day	8 September	1991	Yugoslavia	1991 Macedonian independence referendum.
Norway	Constitution Day	17 May	1814	Denmark	National Day: Independence and the Constitution of Norway (17 May 1814).
Norway	Independence Day	7 June	1905	Sweden	Union Dissolution and Independence Day (7 June 1905).
Pakistan	Independence Day	14 August	1947	United Kingdom	Effective date of the Indian Independence Act 1947; (Note: Independence was at midnight on the 14/15 August, Pakistan chose to celebrate independence on the 14th and India on the 15th.) see also: Pakistan Day (23 March).
Palau	Independence Day	1 October	1994	United States	9 July 1980 is Palau's Constitution Day usually commemorated with formal events. Independence Day celebrations are more elaborate and last several days.
Palestine	Independence Day	1 October	1948	Israel	1948 Palestinian Declaration of Independence on 1 October 1948.
Palestine	Independence Day	15 November	1988	Israel	Palestinian Declaration of Independence on 15 November 1988.
Panama	Independence Day	28 November	1821	Spain	Independence Act of Panama
Panama	Separation Day	3 November	1903	Colombia	Panama was member of Gran Colombia until 1903. The 1903 separation from Colombia is celebrated as an official holiday day on 3 November.
Papua New Guinea	Independence Day	16 September	1975	Australia	Effective date of the Papua New Guinea Independence Act 1975
Paraguay	Independence Day	14 and 15 May	1811	Spain	Revolution of May 14.
Peru	Independence Day	28 July	1821	Spain	Peruvian independence proclaimed by General José de San Martín.
Philippines	Independence Day	12 June	1898	Spain	Philippine Declaration of Independence by Emilio Aguinaldo during the Philippine Revolution against Spain. The Philippines achieved home rule 15 November 1935 and complete independent self-rule from the United States on 4 July 1946. The Philippines celebrated 4 July as Independence Day until 1964.
Philippines	Republic Day	4 July	1946	United States	Treaty of Manila.
Poland	Independence Day	11 November	1918	Russia; Austria-Hungary; Germany	Restoration of Poland's independence in 1918 after 123 years of partitions by Russia, Prussia, and Austria.
Portugal	Restoration of Independence	1 December	1640	Spain	Portugal was officially an autonomous state, but the country was in a personal union with the Spanish crown from 1580 to 1640 – date of the restoration of full Portuguese autonomy from Iberian Union with Spain.
Qatar	National Day	18 December	1878	Ottoman Empire	On 18 December 1878, Jassim bin Mohammed Al Thani succeeded his father, Mohammed bin Thani as ruler of the Qatari Peninsula. He was deemed to have unified all the local tribes by combating external forces, such as the British. He also earned a considerable degree of autonomy for the tribes of the peninsula.
Romania	National Independence Day	10 May	1877	Ottoman Empire	Romania's declaration of its independence and subsequent victory in the Romanian War of Independence, part of the Russo-Turkish War of 1877–1878, against the Ottoman Empire.
Romania	Great Union Day	1 December	1918	Kingdom of Romania; Bukovina (Austria-Hungary); Transylvania (Austria-Hungary); Bessarabia (Russian Empire)	Unification of Romania on 1 December 1918
Rwanda	Independence Day	1 July	1962	Belgium	Effective date of the United Nations General Assembly Resolution 1746 terminating the Rwanda-Urundi Trusteeship.
Saint Kitts and Nevis	Independence Day	19 September	1983	United Kingdom	Association with the United Kingdom fully terminated.
Saint Lucia	Independence Day	22 February	1979	United Kingdom	Association with the United Kingdom fully terminated.
Saint Vincent and the Grenadines	Independence Day	27 October	1979	United Kingdom	Association with the United Kingdom fully terminated.
Samoa	Independence Day	1 June	1962	New Zealand	Named Western Samoa until 1997, it was the first Polynesian nation to be recognized as a sovereign state in the 20th century.
São Tomé and Príncipe	Independence Day	12 July	1975	Portugal	Effective date of the agreement with Portugal reached on 26 November 1974.
Senegal	Independence Day	4 April	1960	France	Transfer of power agreement signed between the Mali Federation and France.
Serbia	Statehood Day	15 February	1804 and 1835	Ottoman Empire	Outbreak of the First Serbian Uprising in 1804, which evolved into a Serbian Revolution; the adoption of the first modern constitution in 1835.
Seychelles	Independence Day	29 June	1976	United Kingdom	Sir James R. Mancham became the country's first President, with France-Albert René as Prime Minister.
Sierra Leone	Independence Day	27 April	1961	United Kingdom	On 20 April 1960, Milton Margai led a 24-member Sierra Leonean delegation at constitutional conferences that were held with the Government of Queen Elizabeth II and British Colonial Secretary Iain Macleod in negotiations for independence held in London. On the conclusion of talks in London on 4 May 1960, the United Kingdom agreed to grant Sierra Leone independence on 27 April 1961.
Singapore	National Day	9 August	1965	Malaysia	Proclamation of Singapore.
Slovakia	Independence Day	28 October	1918	Austria-Hungary	Independence declaration by the Czechoslovak National Council.
Slovakia	Independence Day	17 July	1992	Czechoslovakia	Declaration of Independence in 1992 (only a remembrance day), de jure independence came on 1 January 1993, after the division of Czechoslovakia (public holiday).
Slovakia	Restoration Day	1 January	1993	Czechoslovakia	Effective date of the Dissolution of Czechoslovakia into Czech Republic and Slovakia. Establishment of the first Slovak state since the First Slovak Republic.
Slovenia	Statehood Day	25 June	1991	Yugoslavia	Date of Slovenia's declaration of independence from Yugoslavia in 1991.
Slovenia	Independence and Unity Day	26 December	1990	Yugoslavia	Date of the release of the official results of the independence plebiscite in 1990, confirming secession from Yugoslavia.
Solomon Islands	Independence Day	7 July	1978	United Kingdom	Solomon Islands Act 1978.
Somalia	Independence Day	26 June	1960	United Kingdom; Italy	British Somaliland gained independence from the United Kingdom, although Italian Somaliland wouldn't do so from Italy until five days later.
Somalia	Republic Day	1 July	1960	United Kingdom; Italy	The former Italian and British Somalilands unified as the Somali Republic on 1 July 1960.
South Korea	March 1st Movement	1 March	1919	Japan	Korean Declaration of Independence in 1919. This day is celebrated as Samiljeol, or Independence Proclamation Day.
South Korea	National Liberation Day of Korea	15 August	1945	Japan	Liberation from the Empire of Japan in 1945. See Japanese Occupation of Korea. The Provisional Government of the Republic of Korea was founded in 1919.
South Sudan	Independence Day	9 July	2011	Sudan	The 2011 South Sudanese independence referendum resulted in an overwhelming 98.3% vote in favour of independence, with well over 60% turnout. The predetermined date for the creation of an independent state was 9 July 2011.
Sri Lanka	Independence Day	4 February	1948	United Kingdom	Celebrates to commemorate the country's political independence from British rule in 1948. Event celebrated annually.
Sudan	Independence Day	1 January	1956	United Kingdom; Egypt	A polling process was carried out resulting in the composition of a democratic parliament and Ismail al-Azhari was elected first Prime Minister and led the first modern Sudanese government. On 1 January 1956, in a special ceremony held at the People's Palace, the Egyptian and British flags were lowered and the new Sudanese flag, composed of green, blue and yellow stripes, was raised in their place by the prime minister Ismail al-Azhari.
Suriname	Independence Day	25 November	1975	Netherlands	Under the left-wing pro-independence Den Uyl cabinet Suriname gained independence, albeit with substantial Dutch foreign aid.
Switzerland	National Day	1 August	1291	Holy Roman Empire	Alliance against the Holy Roman Empire in 1291.
Sweden	National Day	6 June	1523	Kalmar Union	Celebrates the election of King Gustav Vasa in 1523 and the new constitutions in 1809 and 1974. The election of King Gustav Vasa was the de facto end of the Kalmar Union.
Syria	Independence Day	17 April	1946	France	End of the French Mandate of Syria in 1946.
Taiwan	Retrocession Day	25 October	1945	Japan	Commemoration of the end of Japanese rule of Taiwan
Tajikistan	Independence Day	9 September	1991	Soviet Union	On 9 September 1991, at the session Supreme Soviet, a Resolution and Declaration "On State Independence of the Republic of Tajikistan" was adopted, being formally signed by acting president Qadriddin Aslonov.
Tanzania	Independence Day	9 December	1961	United Kingdom	Independence as Tanganyika.
Timor-Leste	Proclamation of Independence Day	28 November	1975	Portugal	East Timor Unilateral Declaration of Independence from the Portuguese rule in 1975.
Timor-Leste	Day of Restoration of Independence	20 May	2002	Indonesia	Timorese independence from Indonesian and United Nations administration in 2002.
Togo	Independence Day	27 April	1960	France	On 13 October 1958 the French government announced that full independence would be granted. On 14 November 1958 the United Nations’ General Assembly took note of the French government's declaration according to which Togo which was under French administration would gain independence in 1960, thus marking an end to the trusteeship period. On 5 December 1959 the United Nations’ General Assembly resolved that the UN Trusteeship Agreement with France for Cameroon would end when Togo became independent on 27 April 1960.
Togo	Liberation Day	13 January	1963	France	A military coup on 13 January 1963 led to the assassination of President Sylvanus Olympio by a group of soldiers under the direction of Sergeant Gnassingbé Eyadéma.
Tonga	Emancipation Day	4 June	1970	United Kingdom	Termination of protectorate status in 1970.
Trinidad and Tobago	Independence Day	31 August	1962	United Kingdom	Effective date of the Trinidad and Tobago Independence Act 1962.
Tunisia	Independence Day	20 March	1956	France	Termination of the Treaty of Bardo and signing of the Franco-Tunisian protocol led to the relinquishment of French authority over the country.
Turkmenistan	Independence Day	27 September	1991	Soviet Union	Saparmurat Niyazov was elected as the inaugural President of Turkmenistan.
Tuvalu	Independence Day	1 October	1978	United Kingdom	Toaripi Lauti became the inaugural Tuvaluan prime minister.
Uganda	Independence Day	9 October	1962	United Kingdom	Initially a Commonwealth realm, the country would become a republic one year later.
Ukraine	Independence Day	24 August	1991	Soviet Union	Declaration of Independence of Ukraine
Ukraine	Day of Unity	22 January	1919	Russian SFSR; Austria-Hungary	Unification of Ukraine on 22 January 1919.
United Arab Emirates	National Day	2 December	1971	United Kingdom	Merger of six emirates in the Persian Gulf (Abu Dhabi, Ajman, Dubai, Fujairah, Sharjah, and Umm Al Quwain) into a federal union.
United States	Independence Day or Fourth of July	4 July	1776	Kingdom of Great Britain	United States Declaration of Independence
Uruguay	Independence Day	25 August	1825	Empire of Brazil	Declaration of independence and union with the United Provinces of the Río de la Plata
Uzbekistan	Independence Day	1 September	1991	Soviet Union	Independence was declared in the same month as the failed coup attempt in Moscow.
Vanuatu	Independence Day	30 July	1980	United Kingdom; France	Name of the country changed from the New Hebrides to Vanuatu.
Vatican City	Lateran Treaty Day	11 February	1929	Italy	Lateran Treaty establishing Vatican City as an independent state
Venezuela	Independence Day	5 July	1811	Spain	Venezuelan Declaration of Independence.
Vietnam	National Day	2 September	1945	Japan; France	Proclamation of Independence of the Democratic Republic of Vietnam.
Yemen	Independence Day	30 November	1967	United Kingdom	Declaration of Independence of the South Yemen
Zambia	Independence Day	24 October	1964	United Kingdom	Effective date of the Zambia Independence Act 1964.

== Gallery ==
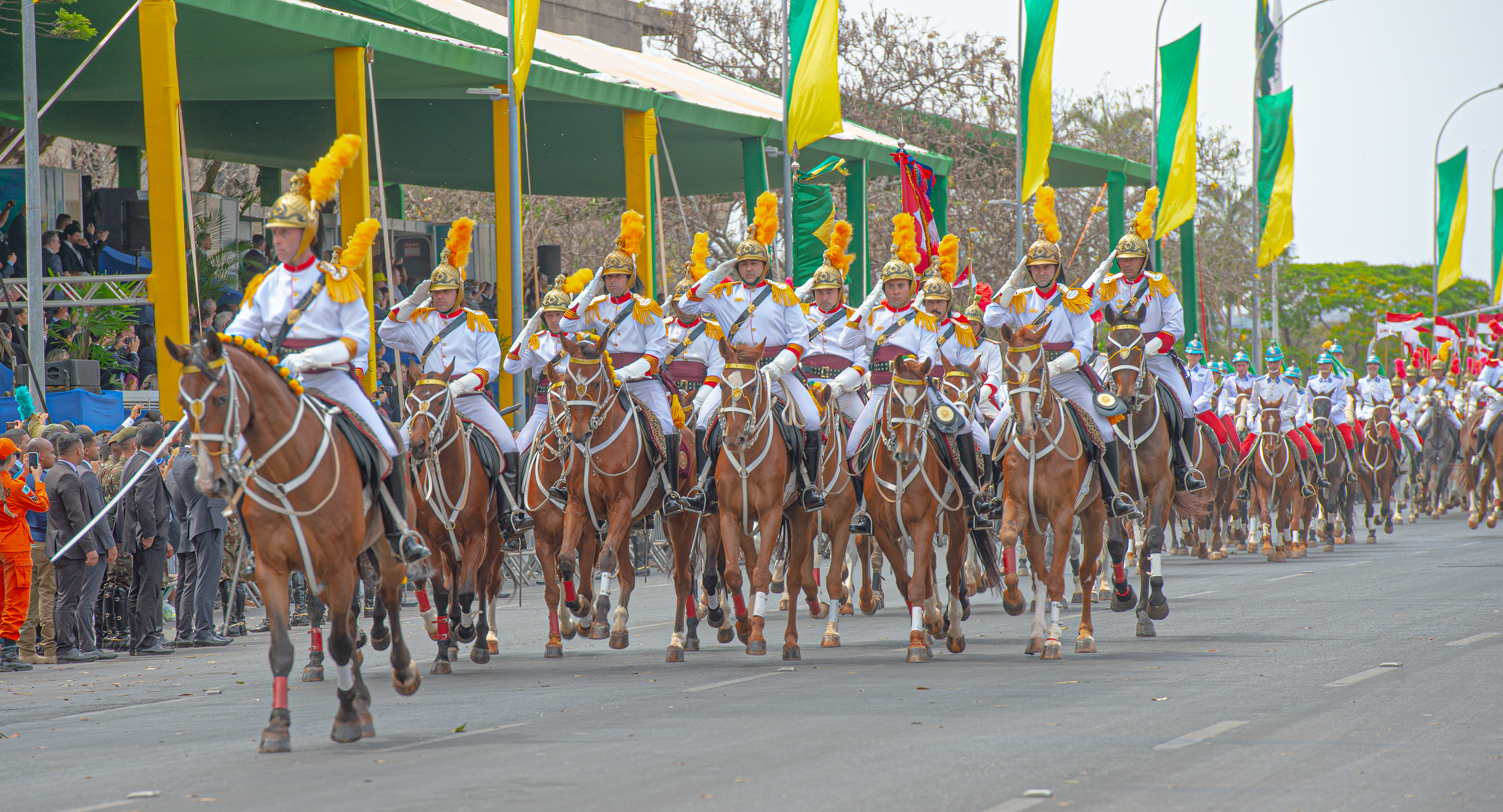
Independence Day in Brazil

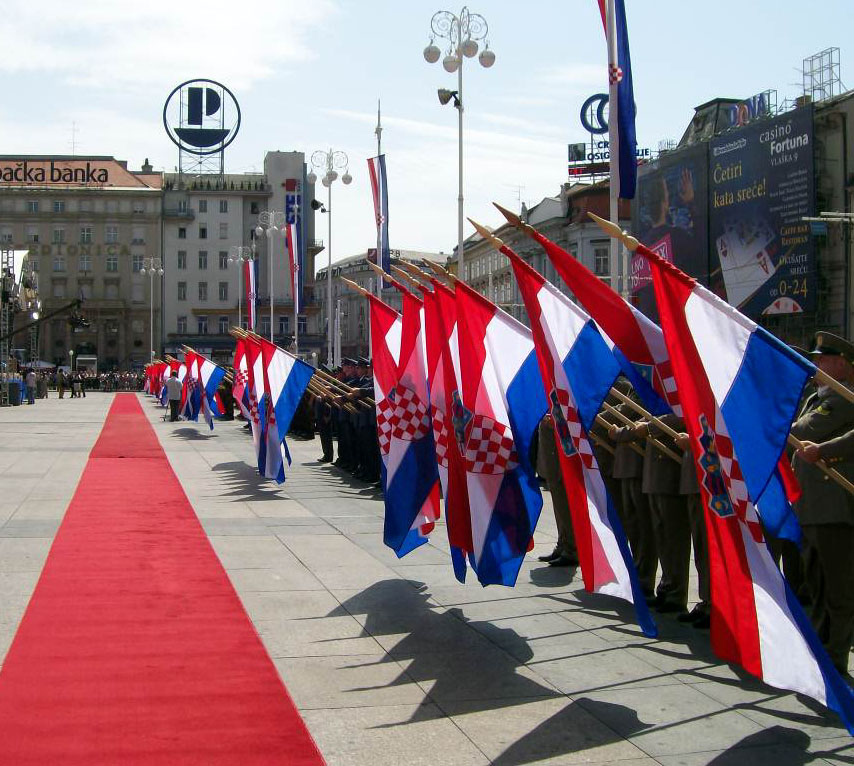
Statehood Day in Croatia

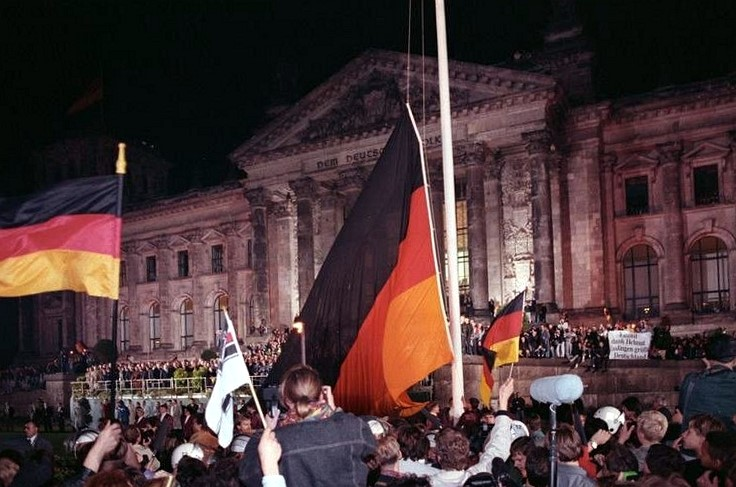
German Unity Day

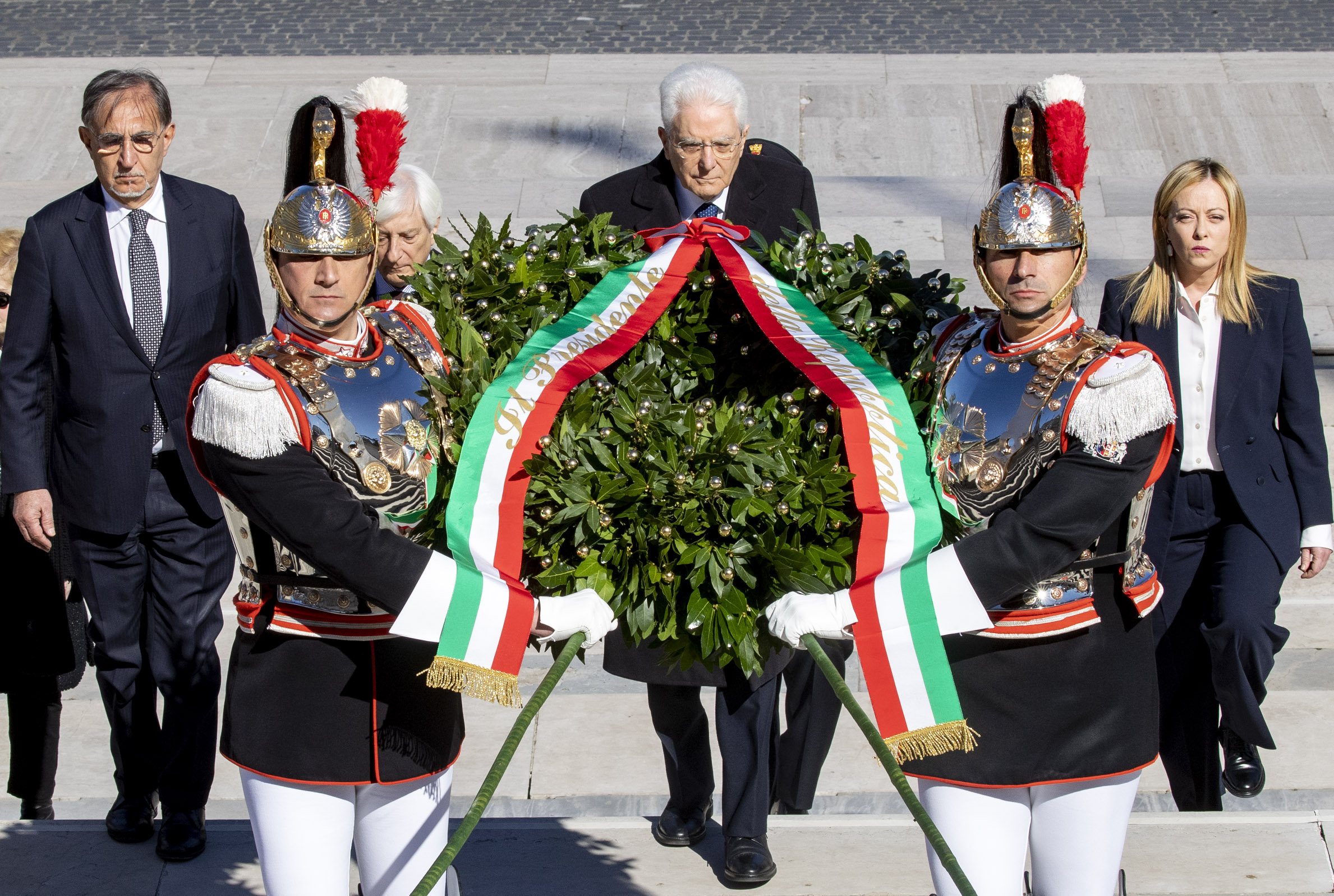
Anniversary of the Unification of Italy

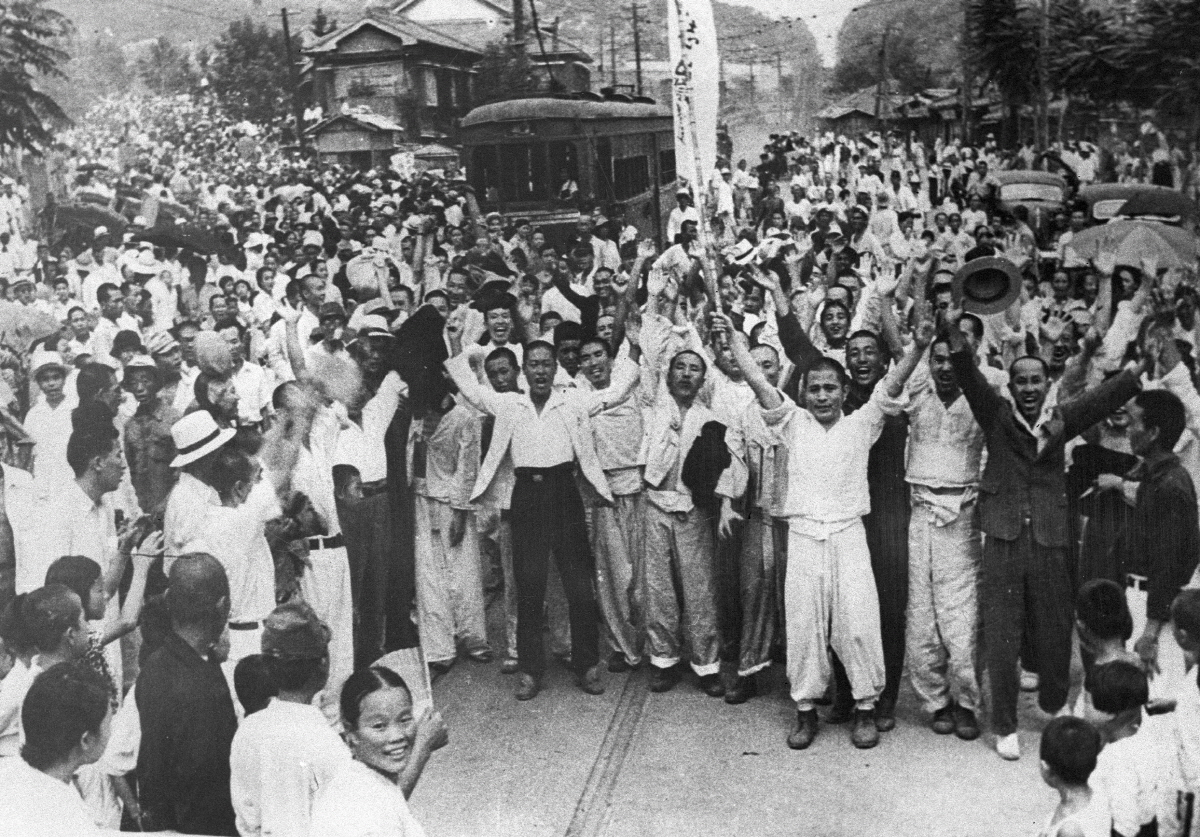
National Liberation Day of Korea

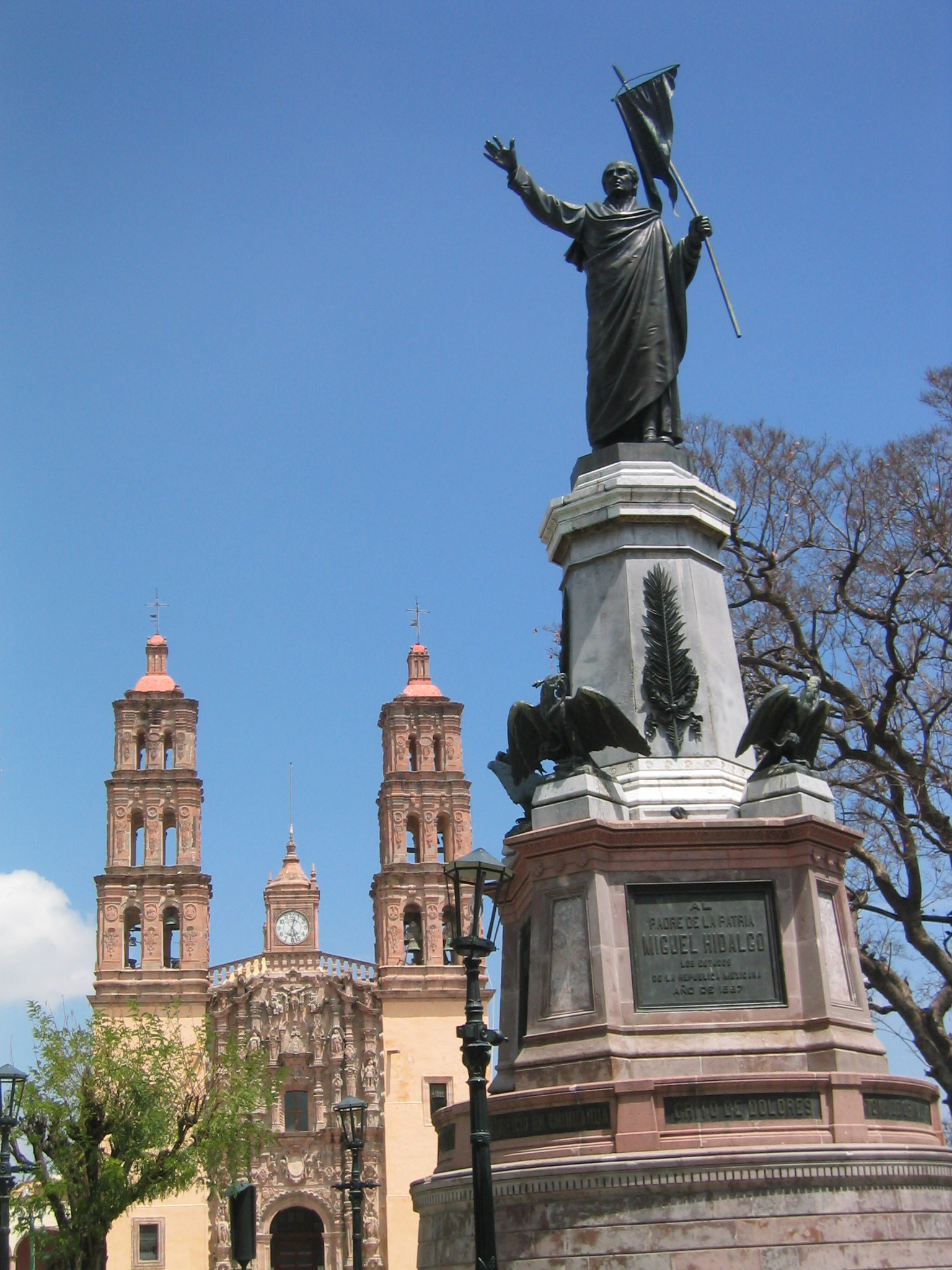
Cry of Dolores in Mexico

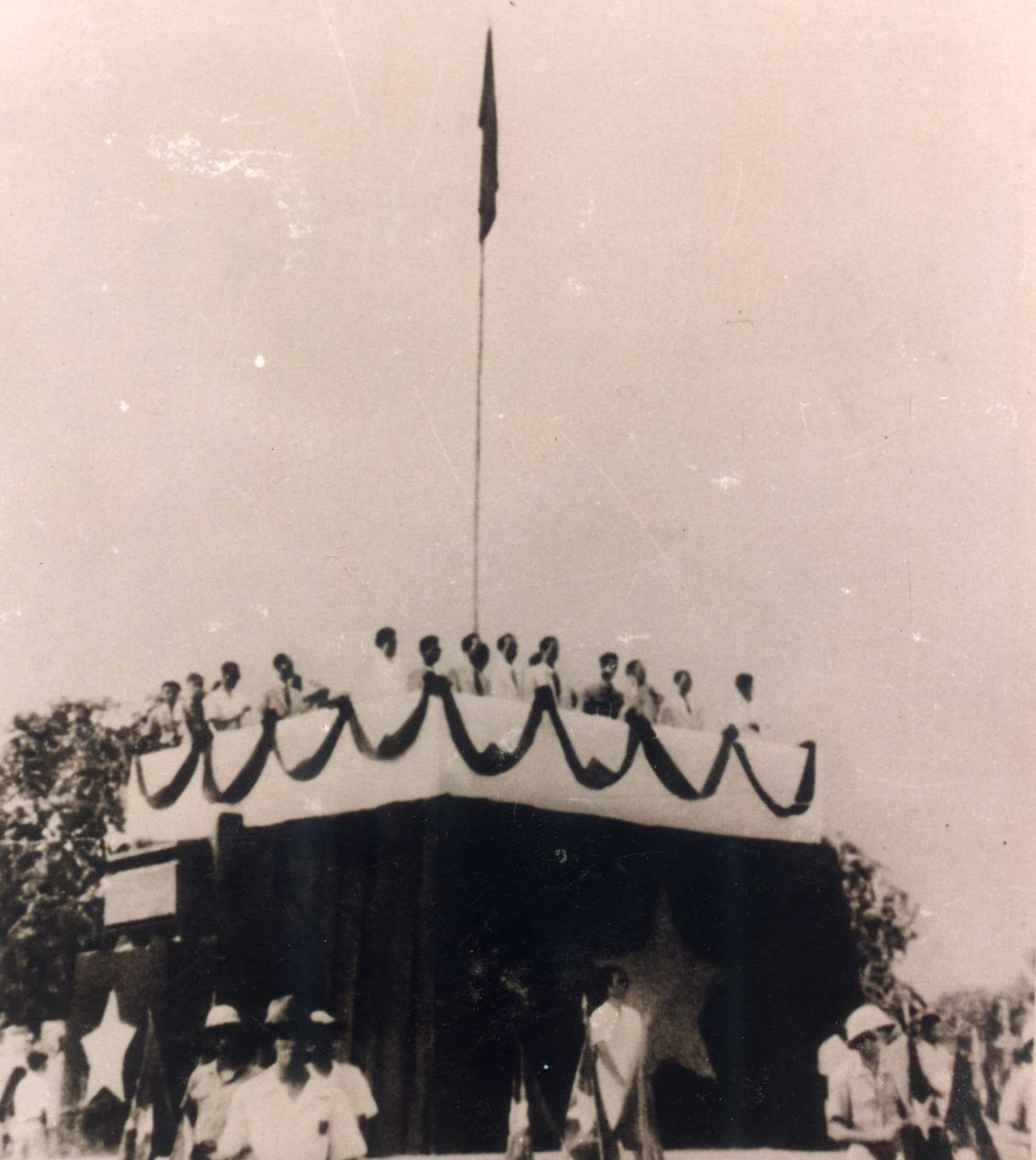
National Day in Vietnam

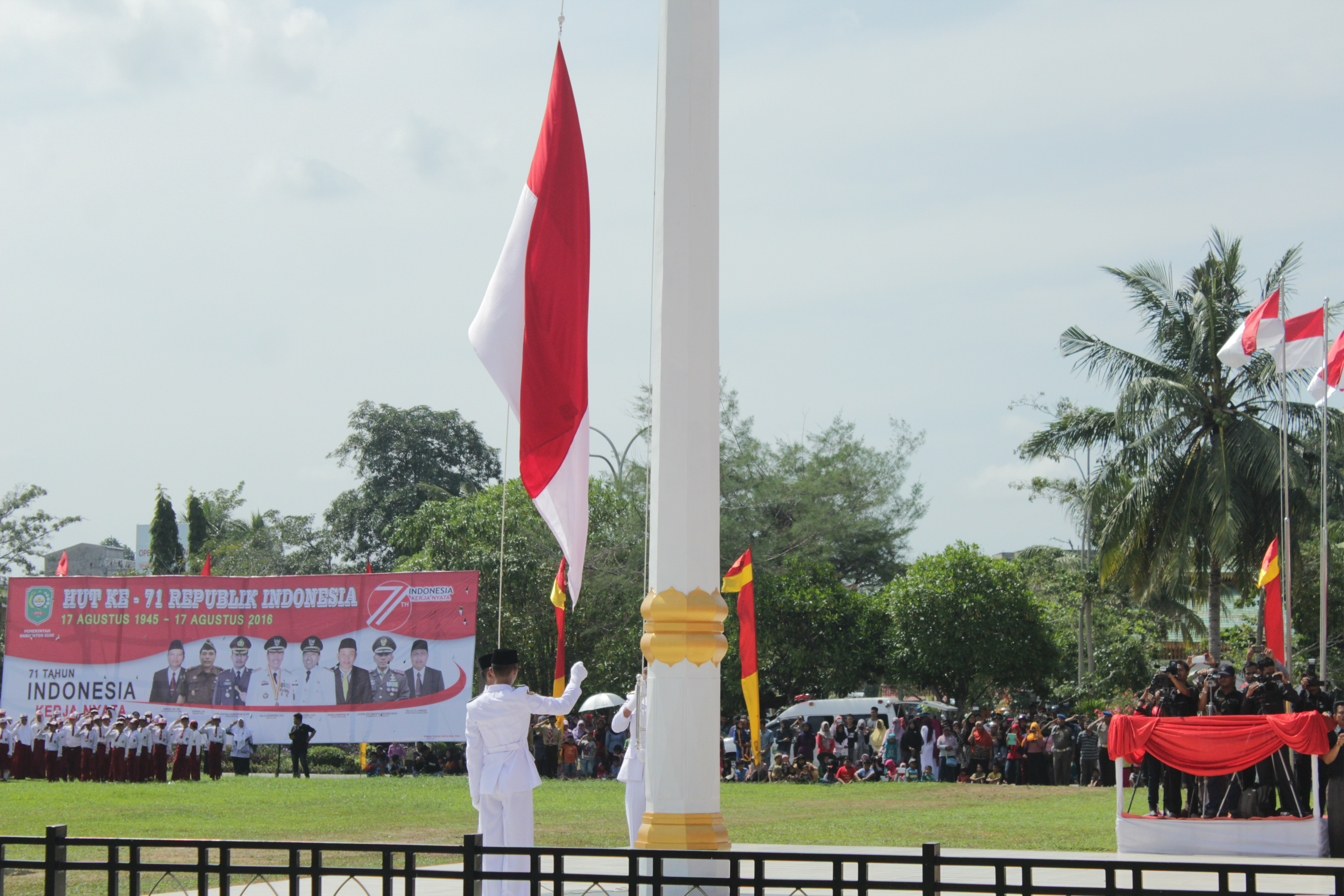
Independence Day in Indonesia

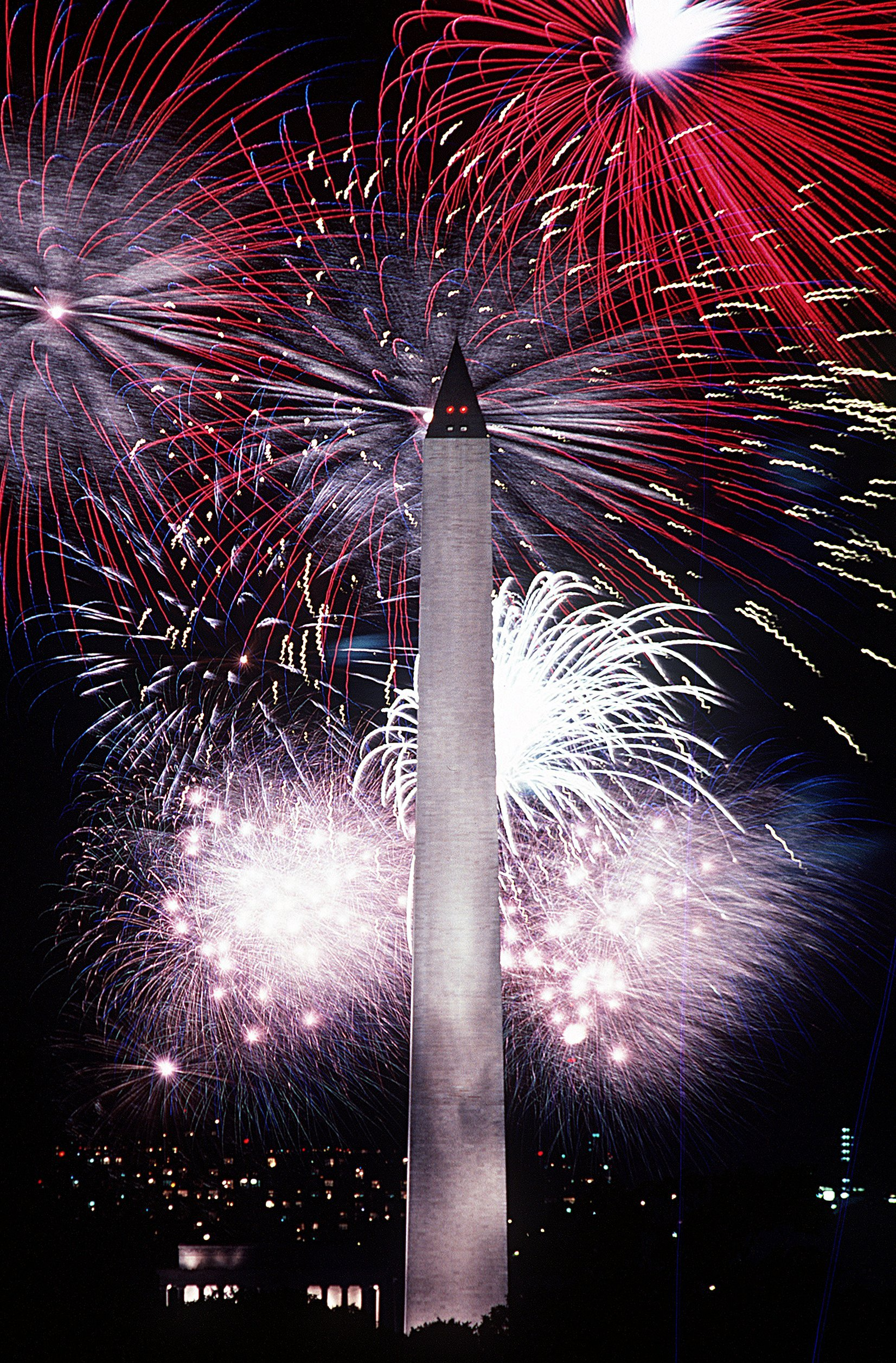
Independence Day in the United States

== See also ==
- Decolonization
- Political history of the world
- Timeline of national independence
- List of countries that gained independence from Spain
