= Dominican holidays =

Dominican holidays may refer to:

- Public holidays in Dominica
- Public holidays in the Dominican Republic
