= Remembrance days in Slovakia =

Remembrance Days in Slovakia are working days.

For Public holidays in Slovakia see National holidays in Slovakia.

| Date | English name | Local name | Remarks |
|---|---|---|---|
| 25 March (1988) | Struggle for Human Rights Day | Deň zápasu za ľudské práva | Commemorates Candle demonstration in Bratislava |
| 13 April (1950) | Unfairly Prosecuted Persons Day | Deň nespravodlivo stíhaných | male monasteries were dissolved and friars were interned in Communist Czechoslovakia |
| 4 May (1919) | Anniversary of the Decease of Milan Rastislav Štefánik | Výročie úmrtia M. R. Štefánika | the Slovak co-founder of Czechoslovakia died in an aeroplane accident under unexplained circumstances |
| 7 June (1861) | Anniversary of the Memorandum of the Slovak Nation | Výročie Memoranda národa slovenského | |
| 5 July (n/a*) | Foreign Slovaks Day | Deň zahraničných Slovákov | at the same time the St. Cyril and Methodius Day; Probably marks the assassination of Matúš Černák, a former minister of the WWII Slovak Republic and then leader of the Slovak exile, in Munich in 1955 |
| 17 July (1992) | Independence Day | Výročie deklarácie o zvrchovanosti SR | Anniversary of the Declaration of Independence of the Slovak Republic |
| 4 August (1863) | Matica Slovenská Day | Deň Matice Slovenskej | Matica Slovenská is a main Slovak cultural institution founded in 1863 |
| 9 September (1941) | Day of the Victims of Holocaust and of racial violence | Deň obetí holokaustu a rasového násilia | the WWII-Slovak Republic issued the Jews Code, see under Jozef Tiso |
| 19 September (1848) | Day of the First Public Appearance of the Slovak National Council | Deň 1. verejného vystúpenia SNR | the Sl. National Council – a kind of predecessor of the present-day Slovak parliament – was created on September 15, 1848, and on 19 September initiated the Slovak Volunteer Campaigns of 1848/1849 (see under Ľudovít Štúr) |
| 6 October (1944) | Dukla Pass Victims Day | Deň obetí Dukly | The passage of this pass at the Battle of the Dukla Pass was an important step in the liberation of Czechoslovakia during WWII |
| 27 October (1907) | Černová Tragedy Day | Deň černovskej tragédie | 15 Slovaks killed and 70 injured in a shooting by policemen when protesting for their priest Andrej Hlinka in the village of Černová; this incident has called the world's attention the attitude to the minorities in the Hungarian part of Austria-Hungary |
| 28 October (1918) | Day of the Establishment of an Independent Czecho-Slovak State | Deň vzniku samostatného česko-slovenského štátu | see under Czechoslovakia |
| 28 October (1815) | Birth of Ľudovít Štúr Day | Deň narodenia Ľ. Štúra | the author of the present-day Slovak language standard |
| 31 October (1517) | Reformation Day | Deň reformácie | Commemorates the day Martin Luther nailed The Ninety-Five Theses on the door of All Saints' Church in Wittenberg, sparking the Protestant Reformation. |
| 30 December (1977) | Day of the Declaration of Slovakia as an Independent Ecclesiastic Province | Deň vyhlásenia Slovenska za samostatnú cirkevnú provinciu | Commemorates the declaration of Slovakia as a separate ecclesiastical province by Pope Paul VI. |
