= Public holidays in Togo =

Public holidays in Togo are days when workers in the Togolese Republic get the day off work.

== Holidays ==
Public Holidays
Date	Name	Remarks
January 1	New Year's Day	
January 13	Liberation Day	From France, 1963
April 27	Independence Day	From France, 1960
First Monday after Easter; Between March 23 and April 26	Easter Monday	Resurrection of Jesus
May 1	Labour Day	
Between April 30 and June 3 Forty days after Easter	Ascension Day	Ascension of Jesus
Between May 11 and June 14; Monday after Pentecost	Whit Monday	Descent of the Holy Spirit
June 21	Martyrs' Day	Honors all the people who fought for Togo throughout history. Celebrated with military parades.
August 15	Assumption Day	Assumption of Mary
November 1	All Saints' Day	
December 25	Christmas Day	Birth of Jesus
Shawwal 1	Korité	End of Ramadan, Breaking of the Fast
Dhu al-Hijjah 10	Tabaski	Feast of the Sacrifice of the prophet Abraham

== Variable dates ==
- 2020
  - Easter Monday – April 13
  - Ascension Day – May 21
  - Korité – May 24
  - Whit Monday – June 1
  - Tabaski – July 31
- 2021
  - Easter Monday – April 5
  - Korité – May 13
  - Ascension Day – May 13
  - Whit Monday – May 24
  - Tabaski – July 20
- 2022
  - Easter Monday – April 18
  - Korité – May 3
  - Tabaski – July 10
  - Ascension Day – May 26
  - Whit Monday – June 6
- 2023
  - Easter Monday – April 10
  - Korité – April 21
  - Tabaski –
  - Ascension Day –
  - Whit Monday – May 29
- 2024
  - Easter Monday – April 1
  - Korité – April 10
  - Tabaski –
  - Ascension Day –
  - Whit Monday – May 20
- 2025
  - Easter Monday – April 21
  - Korité –
  - Tabaski –
  - Ascension Day –
  - Whit Monday –
- 2026
  - Easter Monday – Apr 6
  - Korité –
  - Tabaski –
  - Ascension Day –
  - Whit Monday –
- 2027
  - Easter Monday – March 29
  - Korité –
  - Tabaski –
  - Ascension Day –
  - Whit Monday –
- 2028
  - Easter Monday – Apr 17
  - Korité –
  - Tabaski –
  - Ascension Day –
  - Whit Monday –
- 2029
  - Easter Monday – Apr 2
  - Korité –
  - Tabaski –
  - Ascension Day –
  - Whit Monday –
