= Public holidays in Senegal =

This is a list of public holidays in Senegal.

== Public holidays ==
Date	English name	Description
January 1	New Year's Day	
April 4	Independence Day	From France, 1960
May 1	Labour Day	
August 15	Assumption Day	Christian Feast of the Assumption of the Virgin Mary into heaven
November 1	All Saints' Day	
December 25	Christmas Day	Christian Feast of the Birthday of Jesus
18 Safar	Grand Magal of Touba	The Grand Magal (pilgrimage) is the most important religious festival of the Senegalese Muslim brotherhood, the Mourides.
1 Shawwal	Korité	End of Ramadan, Muslim Breaking of the Fast
10 Dhu al-Hijjah	Tabaski	Muslim Feast of the Sacrifice of the prophet Abraham
12 Rabi' al-awwal	Mawlid	Prophet Mohammed's Birthday
10 Muharram	Tamkharit	Commemorates the victory of Prophet Moses over the pharaohs.
Monday after Easter; March or April	Easter Monday	Christian feast of the Resurrection of Jesus
40 days after Easter; May or June	Ascension Day	Christian feast of Ascension of Jesus into Heaven
Monday after Pentecost; May or June	Whit Monday	Christian feast of the Holy Spirit

== Variable dates ==
- 2020
  - Easter Monday – April 13
  - Korité (Breaking of the Ramadan fast) – May 24
  - Whit Monday – June 1
  - Tabaski (Feast of the Sacrifice) – starts July 31
  - Ashura – starts sundown, August 28
  - Grand Magal of Touba – October 6
  - Mawlid (Prophet's birthday) – starts at sundown, October 28
- 2021
  - Easter Monday – April 5
  - Korité (Breaking of the Ramadan fast) – May 13
  - Whit Monday – May 29
  - Tabaski (Feast of the Sacrifice) – starts July 20
  - Grand Magal of Touba – September 26
  - Mawlid (Prophet's birthday) – starts at sundown, October 18
- 2022
  - Easter Monday – April 18
  - Korité (Breaking of the Ramadan fast)– May 3
  - Whit Monday – June 6
  - Tabaski (Feast of the Sacrifice) – starts July 10
  - Grand Magal of Touba – September 14
  - Mawlid (Prophet's birthday) – starts at sundown, October 7
- 2023
  - Easter Monday – April 10
  - Korité (Breaking of the Ramadan fast)– April 21
  - Whit Monday – May 29
  - Tabaski (Feast of the Sacrifice) – starts June 28
  - Mawlid (Prophet's birthday) – starts at sundown, September 26
- 2024
  - Easter Monday – April 1
  - Korité (Breaking of the Ramadan fast)– April 10
  - Whit Monday – May 20
  - Tabaski (Feast of the Sacrifice) – starts June 17
- 2025
  - Easter Monday – April 21
- 2026
  - Easter Monday – April 6
- 2027
  - Easter Monday – March 29
- 2028
  - Easter Monday – April 17
- 2029
  - Easter Monday – April 2
