= Public holidays in Mali =

This is a list of public holidays in Mali.

== Public holidays ==
Date	Name	Comments
January 1	New Year's Day	
January 20	Armed Forces Day	
March 26	Martyrs' Day	Also called "Democracy Day," this honors those who died for the 1991 Malian coup d'état.
Monday after Easter, March or April	Easter Monday	
May 1	Workers' Day	
May 25	Africa Day	
September 22	Independence Day	From France, 1960
December 25	Christmas Day	
10 Muharram	Ashura	Ashura
12 Rabi' al-awwal	Mawloud	The Prophet's Birthday
19 Rabi' al-awwal	Baptism of the Prophet	Mali is the only country that celebrates this holiday.
27 Ramadan	Leylatoul Qadr	Night of Power
1 Shawwal	Korité	End of Ramadan
10 Dhu al-Hijjah	Tabaski	Feast of Sacrifice
