= List of countries that have gained independence from Spain =

The list of countries obtaining independence from Spain is a list of countries that broke away from Spain for independence, or occasionally incorporation into another country, as depicted in the map below. These processes came about at different periods and world regions starting in the 17th century (Portugal).

== Independence waves ==
Since its beginnings in the 16th century, the Spanish empire conquered new areas starting out from its Castilian core kingdom. In 1597, the Spanish (Castilian) crown lost the Netherlands (Holland). In 1640, Portugal split away after Philip II had incorporated it to its domains in 1581. A second independence tide came about following the Independence of the Thirteen Colonies in North America and the Battle of Trafalgar that heralded the end of the Spanish Atlantic hegemony. Venezuela (1811), under the influence of the Basque Enlightenment, sparked the independence movements of Central and Southern America, spearheaded by Simon Bolivar.

During the Spanish Restoration in the late 19th century, the last major overseas territories Cuba, Puerto Rico, and Philippines detached from the metropolis with the support of the United States during the Spanish–American War in 1898. Since the 1950s, Spain lost the last continental lands in Africa, Spanish protectorate in Morocco, Ifni, Equatorial Guinea and Western Sahara.

== Current countries/territories ==
Modern country	Pre-independence name	Year of Independence	Notes
Malta	Part of the Kingdom of Sicily	1530	Agreement between Charles V and the Order of Malta
Netherlands	Spanish Netherlands	1581	Originally referred to as the Dutch Republic
Portugal	Kingdom of Portugal	1640	Previously in a personal union with Castile
Paraguay	Province of Paraguay	1811	Independence recognized in 1842
Venezuela	Captaincy General of Venezuela	1811	Achieved real independence from Colombia in 1830
Colombia	Viceroyalty of New Granada	1813	Originally referred to as the United Provinces of New Granada
Argentina	Viceroyalty of the Río de la Plata	1816	Originally referred to as the United Provinces of the Río de la Plata
Chile	Captaincy General of Chile	1818	Also previously known as the Kingdom of Chile
Ecuador	Kingdom of Quito	1820	Originally referred to as the Free Province of Guayaquil
Costa Rica	Province of Costa Rica	1821	Initially as part of the Federal Republic of Central America
Dominican Republic	Real Audiencia of Santo Domingo	1821	Achieved real independence from the Spain in 1865
El Salvador	Province of San Salvador	1821	Initially as part of the Federal Republic of Central America
Guatemala	Kingdom of Guatemala	1821	Originally referred to as the Federal Republic of Central America
Honduras	Province of Comayagua	1821	Initially as part of the Federal Republic of Central America
Mexico	Viceroyalty of New Spain	1821	Originally referred to as the Empire of Mexico
Nicaragua	Province of León	1821	Initially as part of the Federal Republic of Central America
Panama	Province of Panama	1821	Initially as part of the Republic of Colombia
Peru	Viceroyalty of Peru	1821	Independence achieved in 1824
Bolivia	Real Audiencia of Charcas	1825	Originally referred to as the State of Upper Peru
Uruguay	Province of Montevideo	1825	Fought against Spain, Brazil and Argentina for independence
Cuba	Captaincy General of Cuba	1898	Detached from Spain by way of the Treaty of Paris in 1898, becoming a protectorate of the United States. Gained independence from the U.S. in 1902, but remained under its direct influence until 1934 through the Platt Amendment.
Philippines	Captaincy General of the Philippines	1898	Detached from Spain by way of the Treaty of Paris in 1898, becoming a territory of the United States. Gained independence from the U.S. in 1946 through the Treaty of Manila.
Puerto Rico (U.S.)	Captaincy General of Puerto Rico	1898	Detached from Spain by way of the Treaty of Paris in 1898, becoming an unincorporated territory of the United States to the present.
Morocco	Protectorate in Morocco	1956	Morocco also achieved independence from France in 1956
Equatorial Guinea	Territories on the Gulf of Guinea	1968	Last Spanish territory to achieve independence

== Historical countries ==
Country	Modern state	Pre-independence name (if different)	Date	Year	Notes
Kingdom of Portugal and the Algarves	Portugal	Kingdom of Portugal under the Iberian Union	1 December	1640	Treaty of Lisbon
Dutch Republic	Netherlands	Spanish Netherlands part of Holy Roman Empire	30 January	1648	Peace of Münster
Austrian Netherlands part of Holy Roman Empire	Luxembourg	Spanish Netherlands part of Holy Roman Empire	7 March	1714	Treaty of Rastatt
Austrian Netherlands part of Holy Roman Empire	Belgium	Spanish Netherlands part of Holy Roman Empire	7 March	1714	Treaty of Rastatt
Kingdom of Naples (Ruled by the Austrian monarchy)	Italy; Campania, Calabria, Apulia, Basilicata, Abruzzo, Molise; Lazio	Kingdom of Naples (Spanish viceroyalty) Spanish Empire	7 March	1714	Treaty of Rastatt
Sardinia	Sardinia part of Italy	Kingdom of Sardinia part of Spanish Empire	8 August	1720	The Peace of Utrecht in 1713 ceded Sardinia to the Habsburg monarchy, who would then exchange it with Victor Amadeus II for Sicily in the Treaty of the Hague.
Saint-Domingue	Haiti	Captaincy General of Santo Domingo	?	1795	Peace of Basel, ceded eastern portion to France
French First Republic; Louisiana	United States; Arkansas; Iowa; Missouri; Kansas; Oklahoma; Nebraska; Minnesota; Louisiana; New Mexico; Texas; North Dakota; South Dakota; Wyoming; Montana; Colorado; Canada; Alberta; Saskatchewan	Spanish Empire; Louisiana	21 March	1801	Treaty of Aranjuez
Republic of West Florida	United States; Louisiana	New Spain; (Spain) Spanish West Florida	26 September	1810	officially the State of Florida, was a short-lived republic in the western region of Spanish West Florida in 1810. It was annexed and occupied by the United States later in 1810
First Republic of Paraguay	Paraguay	(Spain) Viceroyalty of the Río de la Plata	14 May	1811	May Revolution part of Spanish American wars of independence
First Republic of Venezuela	Venezuela	(Spain) Captaincy General of Venezuela	5 July	1811	Venezuelan wars of independence
Uruguay	Uruguay	(Spain) Viceroyalty of the Río de la Plata	?	1811	Uruguay gained independence from Spain, was annexed by the Empire of Brazil, then regained independence in 1825.
United Provinces of the Río de la Plata	Argentina	(Spain) Viceroyalty of the Río de la Plata	9 July	1816	Argentine wars of independence
State of Chile	Chile	(Spain) Captaincy General of Chile	12 February	1818	Chilean wars of independence
Gran Colombia	Colombia	(Spain) Viceroyalty of New Granada	17 December	1819	Bolívar's campaign to liberate New Granada
Protectorate of Peru	Peru	(Spain) Viceroyalty of Peru	28 July	1821	Peruvian War of Independence
First Mexican Empire	Mexico	New Spain	15 September	1821	Mexican War of Independence
First Mexican Empire; Costa Rica	Costa Rica	New Spain; (Spain) Captaincy General of Guatemala	15 September	1821	Costa Rica, El Salvador, Guatemala, Honduras, and Nicaragua were part of the First Mexican Empire. They later got independence and formed the Federal Republic of Central America in 1823. The Federal Republic of Central America dissolved in 1841, leading to the creation of Costa Rica, El Salvador, Guatemala, Honduras, and Nicaragua. The British had annexed northeastern Guatemala, which became the colony of British Honduras.
First Mexican Empire; El Salvador	El Salvador	New Spain; (Spain) Captaincy General of Guatemala	15 September	1821	Costa Rica, El Salvador, Guatemala, Honduras, and Nicaragua were part of the First Mexican Empire. They later got independence and formed the Federal Republic of Central America in 1823. The Federal Republic of Central America dissolved in 1841, leading to the creation of Costa Rica, El Salvador, Guatemala, Honduras, and Nicaragua. The British had annexed northeastern Guatemala, which became the colony of British Honduras.
First Mexican Empire; Guatemala	Guatemala Belize	New Spain; (Spain) Captaincy General of Guatemala	15 September	1821	Costa Rica, El Salvador, Guatemala, Honduras, and Nicaragua were part of the First Mexican Empire. They later got independence and formed the Federal Republic of Central America in 1823. The Federal Republic of Central America dissolved in 1841, leading to the creation of Costa Rica, El Salvador, Guatemala, Honduras, and Nicaragua. The British had annexed northeastern Guatemala, which became the colony of British Honduras.
First Mexican Empire; Honduras	Honduras	New Spain; (Spain) Captaincy General of Guatemala	15 September	1821	Costa Rica, El Salvador, Guatemala, Honduras, and Nicaragua were part of the First Mexican Empire. They later got independence and formed the Federal Republic of Central America in 1823. The Federal Republic of Central America dissolved in 1841, leading to the creation of Costa Rica, El Salvador, Guatemala, Honduras, and Nicaragua. The British had annexed northeastern Guatemala, which became the colony of British Honduras.
First Mexican Empire; Nicaragua	Nicaragua	New Spain; (Spain) Captaincy General of Guatemala	15 September	1821	Costa Rica, El Salvador, Guatemala, Honduras, and Nicaragua were part of the First Mexican Empire. They later got independence and formed the Federal Republic of Central America in 1823. The Federal Republic of Central America dissolved in 1841, leading to the creation of Costa Rica, El Salvador, Guatemala, Honduras, and Nicaragua. The British had annexed northeastern Guatemala, which became the colony of British Honduras.
Panama	Panama	(Spain) Viceroyalty of New Granada	28 November	1821	Independence of Panama (Bloodless revolution)
Ecuador	Ecuador	(Spain) Viceroyalty of New Granada	24 May	1822	Ecuadorian War of Independence
(Bolivia) Bolivian Republic	Bolivia	(Spain) Viceroyalty of the Río de la Plata	6 August	1825	Bolivia war of independence
Second Dominican Republic	Dominican Republic	(Spain) Captaincy General of Santo Domingo (Spanish occupation of the Dominican Republic)	15 July	1865	Spain ceded the island to France in the Peace of Basel. Spain recaptured the eastern portion of Santo Domingo 1809–1821 (the España Boba period). The Republic of Spanish Haiti gained independence from Spain in 1821, was occupied by Haiti, then gained independence as the First Dominican Republic; reoccupied by Spain 1861–1865, the Second Dominican Republic gained independence but was occupied by the United States 1916–1924. The Third Dominican Republic followed the U.S. occupation.
Cuba	Cuba	(Spain) Captaincy General of Cuba	10 October	1898	Prior to its independence from Spain, the United States occupied the island until the signing of the Treaty of Paris (1898), which ended the Spanish–American War). The U.S. Armed Forces left the island in 1902.
First Philippine Republic	Philippines	(Spain) Captaincy General of Philippines	12 June	1898	The Philippines gained its independence from Spain. But United States occupied Philippines (USA and Spain had signed the Treaty of Paris in 1898. Spain give the Philippines to USA to end the Spanish-American war). The Empire of Japan then occupied Philippines during the Second World War before surrendering, after which point the US took control of the Philippines. The Philippines gained independence from the US in 1946 and established the Third Republic of the Philippines
German New Guinea	Marshall Islands; Federated States of Micronesia; United States; Northern Mariana Islands; Palau	(Spain) Spanish East Indies	11 February	1899	Spain sold other smaller islands to Germany in the German–Spanish Treaty
United States; Puerto Rico (Unincorporated); Guam (Unincorporated)		(Spain) Spanish Empire; (Spain) Captaincy General of Puerto Rico; (Spain) Spanish East Indies	11 April	1899	Treaty of Paris (1898)
Morocco		Spanish protectorate in Morocco	7 April	1956	Decolonisation of Africa
Equatorial Guinea		(Francoist Spain) Spanish Guinea	12 October	1968	Decolonisation of Africa
Morocco; (Morocco) Sidi Ifni Province		Ifni	30 June	1969	Decolonisation of Africa
Sahrawi Arab Democratic Republic		Spanish Sahara	26 February	1976	Decolonisation of Africa

== See also ==
- Mexican War of Independence
- Spanish American wars of independence
- Philippines revolution
- Spanish–American War
- Eighty Years' War
- War of the Spanish Succession
- List of national independence days
- Spanish-American war
