= Public holidays in Slovakia =

This is a list of national holidays in Slovakia.

== Table ==
Legend
The date is acknowledged as a national holiday and also a public holiday (non-working day)
The date is acknowledged as a national holiday but is not a public holiday (working day)

| Date | English translation | Local name | Remarks |
|---|---|---|---|
| 1 January (1993) | Day of the Establishment of the Slovak Republic | Deň vzniku Slovenskej republiky | Czechoslovakia split into the Czech Republic and Slovakia; Slovak Independence Day |
| 6 January | Epiphany | Zjavenie Pána | |
| March, April | Good Friday | Veľkonočný piatok | |
| March, April | Easter Monday | Veľkonočný pondelok | See also Dyngus Day |
| 1 May (1886) | Labour Day | Sviatok práce | Also marks the Slovakia’s accession to the European Union on May 1, 2004 |
| 8 May (1945) | Day of Victory over Fascism | Deň víťazstva nad fašizmom | The end of World War II in Europe; Working day since 2026 |
| 5 July (863) | Saints Cyril and Methodius Day | Sviatok svätého Cyrila a Metoda | Slavic missionaries Cyril (Constantine) and Metod (Methodius) came to Great Moravia; Saints Cyril and Methodius Day celebrates the genesis of Slavic literacy, the deep roots of Christianity in the region, and the formation of the distinct cultural and national identity of the Slovak people |
| 29 August (1944) | Slovak National Uprising Anniversary | Výročie Slovenského národného povstania | The Slovaks rose up against Nazi Germany |
| 1 September (1992) | Constitution Day of the Slovak Republic | Deň Ústavy Slovenskej republiky | The constitution of independent Slovakia was adopted in Bratislava; Working day since 2024 |
| 15 September | Day of Our Lady of the Seven Sorrows, patron saint of Slovakia | Sviatok Panny Márie Sedembolestnej, patrónky Slovenska | The Patron saint of Slovakia is Our Lady of the Seven Sorrows; Working day since 2026 |
| 28 October (1918) | Day of the Establishment of an Independent Czecho-Slovak State | Deň vzniku samostatného česko-slovenského štátu | Czechoslovak Independence Day; National holiday since 2021 |
| 1 November | All Saints’ Day | Sviatok všetkých svätých | Cemeteries are visited on or around this day; Traditional and deeply spiritual version of American Halloween |
| 17 November (1939/1989) | Struggle for Freedom and Democracy Day | Deň boja za slobodu a demokraciu | The day serves as a reminder of the bravery and resilience of those who fought against oppressive regimes, first against Nazi regime (1939) and then against communist rule (beginning of Velvet Revolution, 1989); Working day since 2025 |
| 24 December | Christmas Eve | Štedrý deň | Christmas presents are opened in the evening on Christmas Eve |
| 25 December | Christmas Day | Prvý sviatok vianočný | Literally "First Christmas Holiday" |
| 26 December | Second Day of Christmas | Druhý sviatok vianočný | Literally "Second Christmas Holiday" |

== See also ==
- Remembrance days in Slovakia

== Sources ==
- Zákon č. 241/1993 Z. z. o štátnych sviatkoch, dňoch pracovného pokoja a pamätných dňoch
- National and Bank Holidays in Slovakia
