= Public holidays in Jamaica =

The following is a list of Public holidays in Jamaica, which includes Christian holidays and secular holidays.

== Public holidays ==
- New Year's Day, 1 January (public holiday)
- Ash Wednesday, Between 4 February and 10 March (public holiday)
- Good Friday, Friday of Holy Week, late March or early April(public holiday)
- Easter Monday, Monday after Easter(public holiday)
- Labour Day, 23 May (public holiday) People participate in community improvement projects.
- Emancipation Day, 1 August (public holiday). Honors the 311,000 enslaved freed in 1840.
- Independence Day, 6 August (public holiday). Independence from the British Empire in 1962.
- National Heroes' Day, Third Monday in October (public holiday). Honors Alexander Bustamante, Nanny of the Maroons, and five other heroes.
- Christmas Day, 25 December (religious and public holiday)
- Boxing Day, 26 December (public holiday)
