= Public holidays in Saint Kitts and Nevis =

This is a list of holidays in Saint Kitts and Nevis.

- 1 January: New Year's Day
- 2 January: Carnival Day
- 28 January: Buckley's Uprising Day, commemorates Buckley’s Uprising in 1935.
- Good Friday
- Easter Monday
- First Monday in May: Labour Day
- Whit Monday
- First Monday in August: Emancipation Day, commemorates liberation of slaves in 1834.
- First Tuesday in August: Culturama Day
- 16 September: National Heroes' Day, There are currently five national heroes: Robert Llewellyn Bradshaw, Paul Southwell, Joseph Nathaniel France, Simeon Daniel, and Kennedy Simmonds.
- 19 September: Independence Day, from the U.K. in 1983.
- 25 December: Christmas Day
- 26 December: Boxing Day
