= Public holidays in Grenada =

This is a list of holidays in Grenada.

- January 1: New Year's Day
- February 7: Independence Day, from the United Kingdom in 1974.
- (variable): Good Friday
- (variable) Easter Monday
- May 1: Labour Day
- (variable): Whit Monday
- (variable): Feast of Corpus Christi
- August 1: Emancipation Day
- August 11: Carnival
- October 19: National Heroes Day, commemorating the 1983 killing of former Prime Minister Maurice Bishop, several of his cabinet colleagues and civilians at Fort Rupert, also called Fort George.
- October 25: Thanksgiving Day, celebrates the United States invasion of Grenada in 1983.
- December 25: Christmas Day
- December 26: Boxing Day
