= Public holidays in Saint Vincent and the Grenadines =

This is a list of holidays in Saint Vincent and the Grenadines.

(2016 dates)

- January 1: New Year's Day
- March 14: National Heroes Day, honors Chief Joseph Chatoyer on the anniversary of his death in 1795.
- Good Friday (varies each year)
- Easter Monday (varies each year)
- May 1: Labour Day
- Whit Monday (varies each year)
- First Monday in July: Carnival Monday
- First Tuesday in July: Carnival Tuesday
- August 1: Emancipation Day, commemorates the liberation of slaves, 1834.
- October 27: Independence Day, from the UK in 1979.
- December 25: Christmas Day
- December 26: Boxing Day
