= Public holidays in the Bahamas =

The holidays in The Bahamas include the following:

In the Bahamas, holidays that fall on a Saturday or Sunday are typically celebrated on the following Monday. Events that fall on a Tuesday typically are celebrated on the previous Monday. Holidays that fall on Wednesdays or Thursdays (with the exception of Independence Day, Christmas Day, and Boxing Day) are celebrated the following Friday.

== Public holidays ==
Date	English name	Remarks
January 1	New Year's Day	First day of the Gregorian calendar, celebrated with Junkanoo parades in most islands. New Year's Eve sees many beach parties throughout the Bahamas.
January 10	Majority Rule Day	Commemorates the day the Bahamian government gained majority rule for the first time, on this day in 1967. It is usually listed with the emancipation of slavery in 1836 and independence from the United Kingdom in 1973 as the most important events in the history of the Bahamas. Became an official public holiday in 2014. Celebrated with dancing in streets and feasts of traditional Bahamian cuisine.
Friday before Easter Sunday	Good Friday	Marks the end of the Lenten season and the beginning of a 4-day holiday weekend. Most Bahamians attend church services and serve fish as the main meal for the day.
Monday after Easter Sunday	Easter Monday	The last day of the long Easter holiday weekend. Marks the beginning of the beach picnicking season. Cookouts and regattas are also common.
Seventh Monday after Easter	Whit Monday	Marks the end of the Easter cycle, 50 days after Easter Sunday. It is the day after the Feast of Pentecost.
First Friday in June	Labour Day	Established by Fawkes in 1961. The day's festivities start with a large parade in downtown Nassau, commencing around 10:00 a.m. The parade is led by bands and Junkanooers, who provide music for the spectators and marchers. The majority of marchers come from labour unions and political parties. The parade ends at the Southern Recreation Grounds, where leaders of the unions and political parties give speeches.
July 10	Independence Day	Marks the day Bahamas became a fully independent nation, officially splitting from the United Kingdom in 1973. A week-long celebration is held leading up to the day of, when a mix of carnival and Junkanoo parades, fireworks, and speeches of freedom and independence are commonplace throughout the islands.
First Monday in August	Emancipation Day	Celebrates the emancipation of slaves in 1834. Junkanoo, beaching, sailing, and regattas take place throughout the country. Old slave villages such as Gambier and Fox Hill hold their own celebrations.
Second Monday in October	National Heroes' Day	Became National Heroes' Day in 2013 and is dedicated to honouring national heroes of the Bahamas. A ceremony is held with a speech from the Prime Minister, and national heroes are celebrated with a week full of activities. Many people take this day to have family gatherings and picnics.
December 25	Christmas Day	Christmas season in the Bahamas sees many carnivals and festivals throughout the country. Customs have been adopted from other countries, as well, such as gift-giving, feasting, and sending Christmas cards. The holiday season starts with a Christmas tree lighting ceremony in Nassau's Pompey Square.
December 26	Boxing Day	The name comes from the pre-emancipation practice of plantation owners sending boxes to slaves. Usually the wooden boxes were high-quality shipped from England. The day is marked with Junkanoo festivals throughout the nation, including the Christmas Junkanoo Festival in Nassau.

== Variable dates ==
- 2021
  - Easter – April 4
  - Whit Monday – May 24
  - Labour Day – June 4
  - August Monday – August 2
  - National Heroes' Day – October 11
- 2022
  - Easter – April 17
  - Labour Day – June 3
  - Whit Monday – June 6
  - August Monday – August 1
  - National Heroes' Day – October 10
- 2023
  - Easter – April 9
  - Whit Monday – May 29
  - Labour Day – June 2
  - August Monday – August 7
  - National Heroes' Day – October 9
- 2024
  - Easter – March 31
  - Whit Monday – May 20
  - Labour Day – June 7
  - August Monday – August 5
  - National Heroes' Day – October 14
- 2025
  - Easter – April 20
  - Labour Day – June 6
  - Whit Monday – June 9
  - August Monday – August 4
  - National Heroes' Day – October 13
- 2026
  - Easter – April 5
  - Whit Monday – May 25
  - Labour Day – June 5
  - August Monday – August 3
  - National Heroes' Day – October 12
- 2027
  - Easter – March 28
  - Labour Day – June 4
  - Whit Monday –
  - August Monday – August 2
  - National Heroes' Day – October 11
- 2028
  - Easter – April 16
  - Labour Day – June 2
  - Whit Monday –
  - August Monday – August 7
  - National Heroes' Day – October 9
- 2029
  - Easter – April 1
  - Labour Day – June 1
  - Whit Monday –
  - August Monday – August 6
  - National Heroes' Day – October 8
