= List of dates for Easter =

Table of (Gregorian) dates of Easter 2016–2036
Year	Full Moon	Jewish Passover (Note: Jewish Passover is on Nisan 15 of its calendar. It commences at sunset preceding the date indicated (as does Easter by some traditions).)	Astronomical Easter (Note: Astronomical Easter is the first Sunday after the astronomical full moon after the astronomical March equinox as measured at the meridian of Jerusalem according to the WCC proposal.)	Gregorian Easter	Julian Easter
2016	March 23	April 23	March 27		May 1
2017	April 11		April 16		
2018	March 31		April 1		April 8
2019	March 20	April 20	March 24	April 21	April 28
2020	April 8	April 9	April 12		April 19
2021	March 28		April 4		May 2
2022	April 16		April 17		April 24
2023	April 6		April 9		April 16
2024	March 25	April 23	March 31		May 5
2025	April 13		April 20		
2026	April 3	April 2	April 5		April 12
2027	March 22	April 22	March 28		May 2
2028	April 9	April 11	April 16		
2029	March 29	March 31	April 1		April 8
2030	April 17	April 18	April 21		April 28
2031	April 7	April 8	April 13		
2032	March 27		March 28		May 2
2033	April 14		April 17		April 24
2034	April 3	April 4	April 9		
2035	March 24	April 24	March 25		April 29
2036	April 10	April 12	April 13		April 20

This is a list of dates for Easter. The Easter dates also affect when Ash Wednesday, Holy Thursday, Good Friday, Holy Saturday, the Feast of the Ascension and Pentecost occur in a given year. Easter may occur on different dates in the Gregorian Calendar (Western) and the Julian Calendar (Orthodox or Eastern). The accompanying table provides both sets of dates, for recent and forthcoming years—see the computus article for more details on the calculation.

== Earliest Easter ==
=== Western (Gregorian) ===
In 1818 the Paschal Full Moon fell on Saturday, March 21 (the equinox). Therefore, the following day, March 22 and the 81st day of the year, was Easter. The next Easter that early will be 2285. The second earliest Easter, March 23, in that timespan occurred in 1845, 1856, 1913, and 2008. Easter will next occur on March 23 in 2160. These are gaps of 11, 57, 95 and 152 years.

The earliest week by international standard reckoning is W12, and the 12th Sunday of the year is also the earliest possible Easter Sunday.

=== Orthodox (Julian) ===
The earliest dates for Easter in the Eastern Orthodox Church between 1875 and 2099 are April 4, 1915 and April 4, 2010 (Gregorian). Both dates are equivalent to 22 March in the Julian Calendar. The second earliest date for Orthodox Easter, March 23 in the Julian Calendar, last occurred in 1953, and will next occur in 2037. Both of these dates are equivalent to April 5 in the Gregorian Calendar.

== Latest Easter ==
=== Western (Gregorian) ===
In 1943, Easter fell on Sunday, April 25, the 115th day of the year. The last ecclesiastical full moon preceding the Paschal did not occur until March 20; prior to March 21, the fixed date to which the vernal equinox is assigned for the purposes of the computus, meaning the Paschal full moon did not happen until Sunday, April 18. Consequently, Easter was the following Sunday, April 25. Easter will next occur as late again in 2038—a span of 95 years. Easter may also occur on April 25 of a leap year, i.e. the 116th day of the year, but this has never occurred since the Gregorian reforms were implemented. The first time Easter will occur on April 25 in a leap year will be in 3784. This is also the only case where Easter is in ISO week W17, otherwise all occurrences after April 18 and on this day in leap years are in W16. In several cases, Easter falls onto the latest possible, 17th Sunday of the year. The first time that Easter will fall on April 24 in a leap year will be in 4292 which is also the 115th day of the year.

The second latest date for Easter, April 24 or day 114, occurred in 2011. The last time this occurred before was in 1859 and it will not happen again until 2095—spans of 152 and 84 years. Easter also occurred on the 114th day of the year on April 23 in 2000, a leap year.

=== Orthodox (Julian) ===
The latest dates for Orthodox Easter between 1875 and 2099 are May 8, 1983, and May 8, 2078 (Gregorian). Both dates are equivalent to April 25 in the Julian Calendar. The last time Orthodox Easter has fallen on Julian April 24, the second latest date, was in 1888 which is equivalent to May 6, 1888 in the Gregorian Calendar. The next time Orthodox Easter will fall on April 24 in the Julian Calendar is 2051, which is equivalent to May 7, 2051 in the Gregorian Calendar. Until this date, Orthodox Easter has never fallen on Gregorian May 7.

== Western and Orthodox Easter on the same date ==
Despite using calendars that are apart by 13 days, Western Easter and Orthodox Easter occasionally fall on the same date, as happened in 2001, 2004, 2007, 2010, 2011, 2014, 2017, 2025 and will next occur in 2028. For the 20th and 21st centuries, this can happen between Gregorian dates April 4th to April 25th, as this is where the Western and Orthodox date ranges overlap.

In 2028, according to the Western (Gregorian) calendar, the first Paschal Full Moon on or after the Ecclesiastical Spring Equinox (March 21, Gregorian) will fall on Monday, April 10, 2028. The next Sunday, Easter Sunday, will be April 16.

In 2028, according to the Julian calendar (which is currently 13 days behind the Gregorian calendar), the first Paschal Full Moon on or after the Ecclesiastical Spring Equinox (March 21, Julian [= April 3, Gregorian]) will fall on Friday, April 1, 2028 (April 14, Gregorian). The next Sunday, Easter Sunday, will be April 3 (April 16, Gregorian).

== Range of dates for Western and Orthodox Easter ==
Both calendars (Gregorian and Julian) calculate Easter as falling on dates between March 22 and April 25 on their calendars. However, because of the current 13-day difference, Western Easter falls between March 9 and April 12 on the Julian calendar. Conversely, Orthodox Easter falls between April 4 and May 8 on the Gregorian calendar.

The possible dates of Easter depend on the first day of the year and hence its dominical letter. Each type has five possible dates of Easter. Note that some feasts that depend on the date of Easter (may) occur before the leap day, e.g. Shrove Monday.

Possible dates of Easter by type of year
DL	1 January	1 March	Earliest	Early	Median	Late	Latest
D	Thursday	Sunday	22 March	29 March	5 April	12 April	19 April
ED	Wednesday	Sunday	22 March	29 March	5 April	12 April	19 April
E	Wednesday	Saturday	23 March	30 March	6 April	13 April	20 April
FE	Tuesday	Saturday	23 March	30 March	6 April	13 April	20 April
F	Tuesday	Friday	24 March	31 March	7 April	14 April	21 April
GF	Monday	Friday	24 March	31 March	7 April	14 April	21 April
G	Monday	Thursday	25 March	1 April	8 April	15 April	22 April
AG	Sunday	Thursday	25 March	1 April	8 April	15 April	22 April
A	Sunday	Wednesday	26 March	2 April	9 April	16 April	23 April
BA	Saturday	Wednesday	26 March	2 April	9 April	16 April	23 April
B	Saturday	Tuesday	27 March	3 April	10 April	17 April	24 April
CB	Friday	Tuesday	27 March	3 April	10 April	17 April	24 April
C	Friday	Monday	28 March	4 April	11 April	18 April	25 April
DC	Thursday	Monday	28 March	4 April	11 April	18 April	25 April

Sundays on the dates March 22 through April 25 in the Gregorian calendar may be the 81st through 115th day of common years or 82nd through 116th day of leap years. They occur as the last day of ISO week number W12 through W17 and are also the 12th through 17th Sunday of the year, but these numbers mismatch in some years.

Occurrences, weeks and ordinal Sundays of the 35 Gregorian Easter dates
Variant	Easter Sunday	Count	Latest	Next	DoY	Week	Sunday
1	March 22	4	1818	2285	081	W12	12th
1*	March 22	0	—	2972	082	W12	12th
2	March 23	2	1913	2600	082	W12	12th
2*	March 23	5	2008	2160	083	W12	12th
3	March 24	1	1799	2391	083	W12	12th
3*	March 24	1	1940	5280	084	W12	12th
4	March 25	7	1951	2035	084	W12	12th
4*	March 25	0	—	3792	085	W12	13th
5	March 26	12	1989	2062	085	W12	13th
5*	March 26	1	1780	2084	086	W12	13th
6	March 27	9	2005	2157	086	W12	13th
6*	March 27	6	2016	2168	087	W12	13th
7	March 28	6	1937	2027	087	W12	13th
7*	March 28	4	1948	2032	088	W13	13th
8	March 29	9	1970	2043	088	W13	13th
8*	March 29	3	1964	2116	089	W13	13th
9	March 30	14	1997	2059	089	W13	13th
9*	March 30	0	—	2092	090	W13	13th
10	March 31	16	2013	2086	090	W13	13th
10*	March 31	4	2024	2176	091	W13	13th
11	April 1	10	2018	2029	091	W13	13th
11*	April 1	6	1956	2040	092	W13	14th
12	April 2	9	1961	2051	092	W13	14th
12*	April 2	5	1972	2056	093	W13	14th
13	April 3	8	1994	2067	093	W13	14th
13*	April 3	5	1988	2140	094	W13	14th
14	April 4	13	2021	2083	094	W13	14th
14*	April 4	1	1920	2488	095	W14	14th
15	April 5	16	2026	2037	095	W14	14th
15*	April 5	3	1896	2048	096	W14	14th
16	April 6	12	1969	2042	096	W14	14th
16*	April 6	5	1980	2064	097	W14	14th
17	April 7	8	1985	2075	097	W14	14th
17*	April 7	5	1996	2080	098	W14	14th
18	April 8	8	2007	2091	098	W14	14th
18*	April 8	6	2012	2164	099	W14	15th
19	April 9	9	2023	2034	099	W14	15th
19*	April 9	1	1944	2884	100	W14	15th
20	April 10	16	1977	2039	100	W14	15th
20*	April 10	0	—	2072	101	W14	15th
21	April 11	15	1993	2066	101	W14	15th
21*	April 11	4	2004	2088	102	W15	15th
22	April 12	11	2009	2093	102	W15	15th
22*	April 12	5	2020	2172	103	W15	15th
23	April 13	8	1941	2031	103	W15	15th
23*	April 13	4	1952	2036	104	W15	15th
24	April 14	10	1974	2047	104	W15	15th
24*	April 14	4	1968	2120	105	W15	15th
25	April 15	14	2001	2063	105	W15	15th
25*	April 15	0	—	2096	106	W15	16th
26	April 16	17	2017	2090	106	W15	16th
26*	April 16	3	1876	2028	107	W15	16th
27	April 17	10	2022	2033	107	W15	16th
27*	April 17	6	1960	2044	108	W15	16th
28	April 18	9	1965	2049	108	W15	16th
28*	April 18	5	1976	2060	109	W16	16th
29	April 19	9	1987	2071	109	W16	16th
29*	April 19	5	1992	2076	110	W16	16th
30	April 20	12	2025	2087	110	W16	16th
30*	April 20	1	1924	2864	111	W16	16th
31	April 21	14	2019	2030	111	W16	16th
31*	April 21	1	1680	2052	112	W16	16th
32	April 22	8	1973	2057	112	W16	16th
32*	April 22	5	1984	2068	113	W16	17th
33	April 23	1	1905	2079	113	W16	17th
33*	April 23	4	2000	2152	114	W16	17th
34	April 24	5	2011	2095	114	W16	17th
34*	April 24	0	—	4292	115	W16	17th
35	April 25	4	1943	2038	115	W16	17th
35*	April 25	0	—	3784	116	W17	17th

(Variants with an asterisk * are in leap years.)

While the Gregorian computus yields a cycle of 5.7 million years, a complete Dionysian paschal cycle lasts just 532 years, so more than three repetitions have already passed since the First Council of Nicaea.

Occurrences of the 35 Julian Easter dates
Variant	Easter Sunday		Frequency	Count		Gregorian count								Latest	Next
Variant	Julian	Coptic, Ethiopian	Frequency	since 0325	until 1582	16th+17th		18th		19th		20th+21st		Latest	Next
1	22 March	07/26	0.564%	10	8	1 April	0	2 April	0	3 April	0	4 April	2	2010	2105
1*	22 March	07/26	0.188%	3	2	1 April	1	2 April	0	3 April	0	4 April	0	1668	2200
2	23 March	07/27	1.128%	20	15	2 April	0	3 April	1	4 April	2	5 April	2	1953	2037
2*	23 March	07/27	0.376%	6	5	2 April	1	3 April	0	4 April	0	5 April	0	1600	2048
3	24 March	07/28	1.128%	18	12	3 April	2	4 April	2	5 April	2	6 April	0	1885	2143
3*	24 March	07/28	0.376%	7	5	3 April	0	4 April	0	5 April	1	6 April	1	1980	2428
4	25 March	07/29	1.692%	28	21	4 April	3	5 April	2	6 April	1	7 April	1	1991	2075
4*	25 March	07/29	0.564%	9	6	4 April	0	5 April	1	6 April	1	7 April	1	1912	2276
5	26 March	07/30	2.256%	40	32	5 April	2	6 April	1	7 April	1	8 April	4	2018	2029
5*	26 March	07/30	0.752%	12	8	5 April	2	6 April	1	7 April	1	8 April	0	1844	2124
6	27 March	08/01	2.256%	39	29	6 April	2	7 April	2	8 April	3	9 April	3	1961	2034
6*	27 March	08/01	0.752%	13	10	6 April	2	7 April	0	8 April	0	9 April	1	1972	2056
7	28 March	08/02	2.820%	47	34	7 April	2	8 April	5	9 April	4	10 April	2	1977	2061
7*	28 March	08/02	0.940%	16	12	7 April	1	8 April	0	9 April	1	10 April	2	1988	2072
8	29 March	08/03	2.256%	37	27	8 April	3	9 April	3	10 April	2	11 April	2	1999	2083
8*	29 March	08/03	0.752%	13	9	8 April	0	9 April	1	10 April	1	11 April	2	2004	2284
9	30 March	08/04	2.256%	38	29	9 April	4	10 April	2	11 April	1	12 April	2	2015	2026
9*	30 March	08/04	0.752%	13	9	9 April	1	10 April	1	11 April	1	12 April	1	1936	2216
10	31 March	08/05	2.820%	48	36	10 April	5	11 April	2	12 April	2	13 April	3	1969	2031
10*	31 March	08/05	0.940%	15	11	10 April	1	11 April	2	12 April	1	13 April	0	1868	2064
11	1 April	08/06	2.256%	39	29	11 April	1	12 April	2	13 April	3	14 April	4	1985	2058
11*	1 April	08/06	0.752%	13	10	11 April	1	12 April	1	13 April	0	14 April	1	1996	2080
12	2 April	08/07	2.256%	38	27	12 April	1	13 April	2	14 April	4	15 April	4	2001	2085
12*	2 April	08/07	0.752%	14	11	12 April	1	13 April	0	14 April	0	15 April	2	2012	2096
13	3 April	08/08	2.820%	49	35	13 April	4	14 April	3	15 April	3	16 April	4	2023	2107
13*	3 April	08/08	0.940%	16	13	13 April	0	14 April	1	15 April	1	16 April	1	1944	2028
14	4 April	08/09	2.256%	37	27	14 April	6	15 April	2	16 April	1	17 April	1	1955	2039
14*	4 April	08/09	0.752%	13	9	14 April	0	15 April	2	16 April	1	17 April	1	1960	2240
15	5 April	08/10	2.820%	48	36	15 April	3	16 April	3	17 April	3	18 April	3	1993	2055
15*	5 April	08/10	0.940%	15	11	15 April	1	16 April	1	17 April	2	18 April	0	1892	2088
16	6 April	08/11	2.820%	49	37	16 April	2	17 April	2	18 April	2	19 April	6	2009	2071
16*	6 April	08/11	0.940%	16	12	16 April	1	17 April	1	18 April	1	19 April	1	2020	2104
17	7 April	08/12	2.256%	41	29	17 April	1	18 April	2	19 April	3	20 April	5	2025	2109
17*	7 April	08/12	0.752%	13	10	17 April	2	18 April	0	19 April	0	20 April	1	1952	2036
18	8 April	08/13	2.820%	47	34	18 April	4	19 April	4	20 April	3	21 April	2	1957	2041
18*	8 April	08/13	0.940%	16	12	18 April	1	19 April	0	20 April	2	21 April	1	1968	2052
19	9 April	08/14	2.256%	37	27	19 April	4	20 April	3	21 April	2	22 April	1	1979	2063
19*	9 April	08/14	0.752%	13	9	19 April	0	20 April	1	21 April	1	22 April	2	1984	2264
20	10 April	08/15	2.256%	38	29	20 April	3	21 April	2	22 April	1	23 April	3	2006	2079
20*	10 April	08/15	0.752%	12	8	20 April	1	21 April	1	22 April	1	23 April	1	1916	2196
21	11 April	08/16	2.820%	50	38	21 April	3	22 April	2	23 April	2	24 April	5	2022	2033
21*	11 April	08/16	0.940%	15	11	21 April	2	22 April	1	23 April	1	24 April	0	1848	2128
22	12 April	08/17	2.256%	39	29	22 April	2	23 April	2	24 April	3	25 April	3	1965	2038
22*	12 April	08/17	0.752%	13	10	22 April	2	23 April	0	24 April	0	25 April	1	1976	2060
23	13 April	08/18	2.256%	38	27	23 April	1	24 April	3	25 April	5	26 April	2	1981	2065
23*	13 April	08/18	0.752%	13	10	23 April	1	24 April	0	25 April	0	26 April	2	1992	2076
24	14 April	08/19	2.820%	47	34	24 April	3	25 April	3	26 April	3	27 April	4	2003	2087
24*	14 April	08/19	0.940%	17	13	24 April	0	25 April	1	26 April	1	27 April	2	2008	2092
25	15 April	08/20	2.256%	38	29	25 April	4	26 April	2	27 April	1	28 April	2	2019	2030
25*	15 April	08/20	0.752%	13	9	25 April	1	26 April	1	27 April	1	28 April	1	1940	2220
26	16 April	08/21	2.820%	48	36	26 April	5	27 April	2	28 April	2	29 April	3	1973	2035
26*	16 April	08/21	0.940%	15	11	26 April	1	27 April	2	28 April	1	29 April	0	1872	2068
27	17 April	08/22	2.256%	39	29	27 April	1	28 April	2	29 April	3	30 April	4	1989	2062
27*	17 April	08/22	0.752%	13	10	27 April	1	28 April	1	29 April	0	30 April	1	2000	2084
28	18 April	08/23	2.256%	39	28	28 April	1	29 April	2	30 April	4	1 May	4	2005	2089
28*	18 April	08/23	0.752%	14	11	28 April	1	29 April	0	30 April	0	1 May	2	2016	2100
29	19 April	08/24	2.820%	48	35	29 April	4	30 April	3	1 May	3	2 May	3	2021	2027
29*	19 April	08/24	0.940%	16	12	29 April	1	30 April	1	1 May	1	2 May	1	1948	2032
30	20 April	08/25	2.256%	37	27	30 April	5	1 May	3	2 May	1	3 May	1	1959	2043
30*	20 April	08/25	0.752%	13	9	30 April	0	1 May	2	2 May	1	3 May	1	1964	2138
31	21 April	08/26	1.692%	29	23	1 May	2	2 May	1	3 May	1	4 May	2	1986	2059
31*	21 April	08/26	0.564%	9	6	1 May	1	2 May	1	3 May	1	4 May	0	1812	2176
32	22 April	08/27	1.692%	30	22	2 May	0	3 May	1	4 May	2	5 May	5	2013	2097
32*	22 April	08/27	0.564%	10	8	2 May	1	3 May	0	4 May	0	5 May	1	2024	2108
33	23 April	08/28	1.128%	19	13	3 May	1	4 May	2	5 May	2	6 May	1	1945	2203
33*	23 April	08/28	0.376%	7	6	3 May	0	4 May	0	5 May	0	6 May	1	1956	2040
34	24 April	08/29	1.128%	18	13	4 May	3	5 May	2	6 May	0	7 May	0	1793	2051
34*	24 April	08/29	0.376%	6	4	4 May	0	5 May	0	6 May	2	7 May	0	1888	2336
35	25 April	08/30	0.564%	10	8	5 May	1	6 May	0	7 May	0	8 May	1	1983	2078
35*	25 April	08/30	0.188%	3	2	5 May	0	6 May	1	7 May	0	8 May	0	1736	2268

== Public holidays ==
In Hungary, Kenya, the United Kingdom (except Scotland), Hong Kong, Australia, New Zealand, South Africa, the Czech Republic, Slovakia, Germany, Serbia, Sweden, Switzerland, Namibia, Malawi, Botswana, Zambia and Zimbabwe, Easter has two public holidays, Good Friday and Easter Monday, making a four-day weekend. The movable date of Easter sometimes brings it into conflict with other, fixed or moveable, public holidays.

- In the United Kingdom in 2000 and 2011, the May Day bank holiday was one week after Easter Monday, causing there to be three consecutive weeks with a bank holiday. (In Scotland, this did not occur as Easter Monday is not a bank holiday.) In 2011, a bank holiday was declared on Friday 29 April for the wedding of Prince William and Catherine Middleton; consequently there were four bank holidays within three consecutive calendar weeks (including two in one week), creating two consecutive four-day weekends, with a three-day working week in between.
- In Northern Ireland and the Republic of Ireland in 2008, Saint Patrick's Day (Monday 17 March) fell six days before Easter (Sunday 23 March), creating a three-day week (Tuesday 18 – Thursday 20 March). This will next happen in 2035, when Saint Patrick's Day falls on Saturday, so the public holiday is moved forward to the following Monday 19 March, again six days before Easter.
  - In the Catholic liturgical calendar, saints' feasts are not observed when they fall during Holy Week; this caused Saint Patrick not to appear in the liturgical calendar for 2008; 17 March was simply celebrated as Holy Monday. In Ireland, the Church chose to celebrate Saint Patrick on Saturday 15 March instead.
- In Australia and New Zealand, ANZAC Day is a public holiday on 25 April. In 2000 and 2011, this created a five-day weekend over Easter; in 2000, Easter Monday fell on 24 April, with the following Tuesday, 25 April, then being ANZAC Day; in 2011, ANZAC Day and Easter Monday coincided on Monday 25 April, which led to a substitute public holiday being declared in Australia for Tuesday 26 April, and likely contributed to New Zealand's introduction of Mondayising legislation in 2013.
- In Hong Kong in 2021, Easter Sunday (4 April) coincided with the Ching Ming (Qingming) Festival, leading to public holidays on Monday 5 April (the day after Ching Ming) and Tuesday 6 April (the day after Easter Monday), and a five-day weekend (Friday 2 – Tuesday 6 April).
- In Serbia in 2024, Easter holidays will be immediately preceded by Labour Day which is observed on 1 May and 2 May, creating a six-day weekend (Wednesday 1 May - Monday 6 May).
- In South Africa in 2008, Good Friday on 21 March coincided with the Human Rights Day public holiday. To compensate for this an additional public holiday was declared on Friday 2 May, the day following Workers' Day.
- Easter is not a federal holiday in the United States. In North Carolina, however, it was a public holiday from 1935 to 1987.
- In Denmark and Norway, Easter is celebrated with public holidays on the Maundy Thursday and Good Friday before, and Easter Monday. In Norway, schools and businesses traditionally have a half-day on the Wednesday as well. In Denmark schools have a week-and-a-day Easter Holiday, being closed on Monday-Wednesday before Easter, as well as for the public holidays.

Good Friday is a statutory holiday in all of Canada except for Quebec, where Easter Monday is a statutory holiday instead. There are no other statutory holidays in Canada in March or April, except in Newfoundland and Labrador which observes St. Patrick's Day on March 17 and St. George's Day on April 23.
