= Errol Barrow Day =

Barbadian public holiday

- Observed by: Barbados
- Observances: Community, historical celebrations; Parliamentary recognition.
- Date: 21 January
- Next time: 21 January 2026
- Frequency: annual
- Related to: Errol Barrow's Birthday

Errol Barrow Day is a Barbadian public holiday celebrated on 21 January, to commemorate Errol Barrow, the former Prime Minister of Barbados, who helped lead his country to independence from the United Kingdom. The date is the second public holiday of the calendar year and is the date of birth for the former leader.

Errol Barrow died suddenly in 1987, and in 1989 his birthday was declared as the first public holiday to honor him. On that date, his portrait was placed on the new Barbadian dollar note and the middle section of the Airport-West Coast Highway was officially named after him. Subsequently, he was further declared as one of Barbados' original National Heroes in 1998.

== Tradition ==
As a public holiday, much of the businesses in the country are closed on this day.

== Notes ==
- Errol Barrow Park
