= Slovak National Council's Declaration of Independence of the Slovak Nation =

The Slovak National Council's Declaration of Independence of the Slovak Nation (Slovak: Deklarácia Slovenskej národnej rady o zvrchovanosti Slovenskej republiky) was a resolution of the Slovak National Council on 17 July 1992, by which members of the Council demanded Slovakia's independence although it was not a Unilateral Declaration of Independence. This event was part of a process, which finished with the dissolution of Czechoslovakia and creation of an independent Slovakia on 1 January 1993.

The text of the declaration in Slovak:

My, demokraticky zvolená Slovenská národná rada,

slávnostne vyhlasujeme,

že tisícročné úsilie slovenského národa o svojbytnosť

sa naplnilo.

V tejto historickej chvíli deklarujeme prirodzené právo slovenského národa na sebaurčenie tak, ako to zakotvujú aj všetky medzinárodné dohody a zmluvy o práve národov na sebaurčenie.

Uznávajúc právo národov na sebaurčenie, vyhlasujeme, že aj my si chceme slobodne utvárať spôsob a formu národného a štátneho života, pričom budeme rešpektovať práva všetkých, každého občana, národov, národnostných menšín a etnických skupín, demokratické a humanistické odkazy Európy a sveta.

Touto deklaráciou Slovenská národná rada vyhlasuje zvrchovanosť Slovenskej republiky ako základ suverénneho štátu slovenského národa.

Bratislava 17. júl 1992

English translation:

We, the democratically elected Slovak National Council,

solemnly declare

that the thousand years' struggle of Slovak nation for independence ("self-standing") has been fulfilled.

In this historical moment, we declare the natural right of the Slovak nation for self-determination, as embodied by all international agreements and treaties about the right of nations for self-determination.

Recognizing the right of nations for self-determination, we declare, that we also want to freely create the way and form of national and state life, while respecting the rights of everybody, all citizens, nations, national minorities, ethnic groups, the democratic and humanist legacy of Europe and of the world.

By this declaration, the Slovak National Council declares sovereignty of the Slovak Republic as a basis for a sovereign state of the Slovak nation.

Bratislava, 17 July 1992
