= Public holidays in Saint Lucia =

This is a list of holidays in Saint Lucia.

- 1-2 January New Year's Day
- 22 February Independence Day, from the UK, 1979
- Variable Good Friday
- Variable Easter Monday
- 1 May Labour Day
- Variable Whit Monday
- Variable Corpus Christi
- 1 August Emancipation Day, commemorates the liberation of slaves in 1834.
- First Monday in October: Thanksgiving Day
- 13 December National Day, patron saint of the island.
- 25 December Christmas Day
- 26 December Boxing Day
