= Public holidays in Dominica =

This is a list of public holidays in Dominica.

Date	Name	Comments
January 1	New Year's Day	
February or March	Carnival Monday	
February or March	Carnival Tuesday	
March or April	Good Friday	
March or April	Easter Monday	
First Monday in May	Labour Day	
May or June	Whit Monday	
First Monday in August	Emancipation Day	Marks the end of slavery in 1834.
November 3	Independence Day	From the UK in 1978.
November 4	Community Service Day	Public service holiday.
December 25	Christmas Day	
December 26	Boxing Day	
