= Independence Day (Grenada) =

Public holiday in Grenada

Independence Dey
- Observed by: Grenada
- Significance: Commemorate Independence from the United Kingdom (1974)
- Celebrations: Ceremonies, parades
- Date: February 7th
- Next time: 7 February 2027
- Frequency: Annual

Independence Day of Grenada is a public holiday on 7 February. It is celebrated with parades and ceremonies to commemorate Grenada's independence from the United Kingdom in 1974. The 50th anniversary was in 2024.

== Background ==
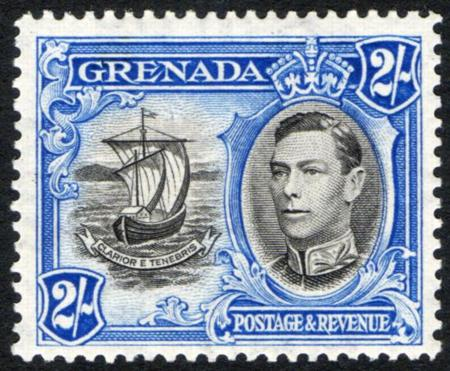
1943 two shilling stamp depicting then-ruler, King George VI.

Grenada was first colonized in the 1600s by the French, who established sugar plantations and brought slaves from Africa. In 1762, Britain took control of the island. This control lasted until Grenada achieved full independence from the UK in 1974.

== Celebrations ==
On 7 February 2024, Grenada celebrated its 50th year of independence. Prime Minister Dickon Mitchell announced the 50th anniversary celebrations at St George's on 31 October 2023. The celebrations took place throughout 2024 and included calypso and gospel concerts, relay races, triathlon, arts exhibitions, and galas. The celebrations culminated in a military parade on 7 February at the National Stadium.
