= Public holidays in Barbados =

There are 12 public holidays in Barbados, which includes Christian holidays and secular holidays. Holidays in Barbados are also referred to as bank holidays locally:

Holiday	Date	Date in 2026	Remarks
New Year's Day	1 January	1 January 2026	Celebrates the first day of every year in the Gregorian calendar.
Errol Barrow Day	21 January	21 January 2026	A day of recognition for Errol Barrow, the Father of the Nation.
Good Friday	Date varies	3 April 2026	Commemorates the crucifixion and death of Jesus.
Easter Monday	Date varies	6 April 2026	Day after Easter Sunday.
National Heroes' Day	28 April	28 April 2026	Celebrated in honour of the eleven Barbadian National Heroes.
Labour Day	1 May	1 May 2026	Celebrated in recognition of International Workers' Day.
Whit Monday	Date varies	25 May 2026	Day after Pentecost.
Emancipation Day	1 August	1 August 2026	The date on which Trans-Atlantic African slavery was abolished throughout the British Empire.
Kadooment Day	First Monday in August	03 August 2026	Climax of Crop Over celebrations.
Independence Day	30 November	30 November 2026	The anniversary of Barbadian National Independence, from the United Kingdom in 1966 and Saint Andrew's Day. It is also the anniversary of the proclamation of Barbados as a Republic within the Commonwealth on 30 November 2021.
Christmas Day	25 December	25 December 2026	Celebrates the birth of Jesus.
Boxing Day	26 December	26 December 2026	Day after Christmas.

== See also ==
- List of holidays by country
- List of countries by number of public holidays
