= Public holidays in the Dominican Republic =

This is a list of holidays in Dominican Republic.

== Public holidays ==
- January 1: New Year's Day, national holiday
- January 6: Epiphany (Dia de Los Reyes), national holiday
- January 21: Our Lady of High Grace, national holiday
- January 26: Duarte's Birthday, national holiday
- February 27: Independence Day, national holiday
- Friday of Holy Week, March or April: Good Friday, national holiday
- May 1: Labour Day, national holiday
- Second Thursday after Pentecost, May or June: Corpus Christi, national holiday
- August 16: Restoration Day, national holiday
- September 24: Our Lady of Mercy (Nuestra Senora de las Mercedes), national holiday
- November 6: Constitution Day, national holiday
- December 25: Christmas Day, national holiday
