= Lists of holidays by country =

Below are lists of public holidays by country.

== Current countries ==
- Public holidays in Afghanistan
- Public holidays in Albania
- Public holidays in Algeria
- Public holidays in Andorra
- Public holidays in Angola
- Public holidays in Antigua and Barbuda
- Public holidays in Argentina
- Public holidays in Armenia
- Public holidays in Australia
  - Public holidays in Christmas Island
  - Public holidays in the Cocos (Keeling) Islands
  - Public holidays in Norfolk Island
- Public holidays in Austria
- Public holidays in Azerbaijan
- Public holidays in the Bahamas
- Public holidays in Bahrain
- Public holidays in Bangladesh
- Public holidays in Barbados
- Public holidays in Belarus
- Public holidays in Belgium
- Public holidays in Belize
- Public holidays in Benin
- Public holidays in Bhutan
- Public holidays in Bolivia
- Public holidays in Bosnia and Herzegovina
- Public holidays in Botswana
- Public holidays in Brazil
- Public holidays in Brunei
- Public holidays in Bulgaria
- Public holidays in Burkina Faso
- Public holidays in Burundi
- Public holidays in Cambodia
- Public holidays in Cameroon
- Public holidays in Canada
- Public holidays in Cape Verde
- Public holidays in the Central African Republic
- Public holidays in Chad
- Public holidays in Chile
- Public holidays in China
  - Public holidays in Hong Kong
  - Public holidays in Macau
- Public holidays in Colombia
- Public holidays in the Comoros
- Public holidays in the Democratic Republic of the Congo
- Public holidays in the Republic of the Congo
- Public holidays in Costa Rica
- Public holidays in Ivory Coast
- Public holidays in Croatia
- Public holidays in Cuba
- Public holidays in Cyprus
- Public holidays in the Czech Republic
- Public holidays in Denmark
  - Public holidays in the Faroe Islands
  - Public holidays in Greenland
- Public holidays in Djibouti
- Public holidays in Dominica
- Public holidays in the Dominican Republic
- Public holidays in East Timor
- Public holidays in Ecuador
- Public holidays in Egypt
- Public holidays in El Salvador
- Public holidays in Equatorial Guinea
- Public holidays in Eritrea
- Public holidays in Estonia
- Public holidays in Eswatini
- Public holidays in Ethiopia
- Public holidays in Fiji
- Public holidays in Finland
  - Public holidays in the Åland Islands
- Public holidays in France
  - Public holidays in Guadeloupe
  - Public holidays in French Guiana
  - Public holidays in Martinique
  - Public holidays in New Caledonia
  - Public holidays in French Polynesia
  - Public holidays in Réunion
  - Public holidays in Saint Barthélemy
  - Public holidays in Saint Martin
  - Public holidays in Wallis and Futuna
- Public holidays in Gabon
- Public holidays in the Gambia
- Public holidays in Georgia
  - Public holidays in Abkhazia
  - Public holidays in South Ossetia
- Public holidays in Germany
- Public holidays in Ghana
- Public holidays in Greece
- Public holidays in Grenada
- Public holidays in Guatemala
- Public holidays in Guernsey
- Public holidays in Guinea
- Public holidays in Guinea-Bissau
- Public holidays in Guyana
- Public holidays in Haiti
- Public holidays in Honduras
- Public holidays in Hungary
- Public holidays in Iceland
- Public holidays in India
- Public holidays in Indonesia
- Public holidays in Iran
- Public holidays in Iraq
- Public holidays in the Republic of Ireland
- Public holidays in the Isle of Man
- Public holidays in Israel
- Public holidays in Italy
- Public holidays in Jamaica
- Public holidays in Japan
- Public holidays in Jersey
- Public holidays in Jordan
- Public holidays in Kazakhstan
- Public holidays in Kenya
- Public holidays in Kiribati
- Public holidays in North Korea
- Public holidays in South Korea
- Public holidays in Kosovo
- Public holidays in Kuwait
- Public holidays in Kyrgyzstan
- Public holidays in Laos
- Public holidays in Latvia
- Public holidays in Lebanon
- Public holidays in Lesotho
- Public holidays in Liberia
- Public holidays in Libya
- Public holidays in Liechtenstein
- Public holidays in Lithuania
- Public holidays in Luxembourg
- Public holidays in Madagascar
- Public holidays in Malawi
- Public holidays in Malaysia
  - Public holidays in Sabah
- Public holidays in the Maldives
- Public holidays in Mali
- Public holidays in Malta
- Public holidays in the Marshall Islands
- Public holidays in Mauritania
- Public holidays in Mauritius
- Public holidays in Mexico
- Public holidays in the Federated States of Micronesia
- Public holidays in Moldova
  - Public holidays in Transnistria
- Public holidays in Monaco
- Public holidays in Mongolia
- Public holidays in Montenegro
- Public holidays in Morocco
- Public holidays in Mozambique
- Public holidays in Myanmar
- Public holidays in Namibia
- Public holidays in Nauru
- Public holidays in Nepal
- Public holidays in the Netherlands
  - Public holidays in Aruba
  - Public holidays in Bonaire
  - Public holidays in Curaçao
  - Public holidays in Saba
  - Public holidays in Sint Eustatius
  - Public holidays in Sint Maarten
- Public holidays in New Zealand
  - Public holidays in the Cook Islands
  - Public holidays in Niue
  - Public holidays in Tokelau
- Public holidays in Nicaragua
- Public holidays in Niger
- Public holidays in Nigeria
- Public holidays in North Macedonia
- Public holidays in Norway
- Public holidays in Oman
- Public holidays in Pakistan
- Public holidays in Palau
- Public holidays in Palestine
- Public holidays in Panama
- Public holidays in Papua New Guinea
- Public holidays in Paraguay
- Public holidays in Peru
- Public holidays in the Philippines
- Public holidays in Poland
- Public holidays in Portugal
- Public holidays in Qatar
- Public holidays in Romania
- Public holidays in Russia
- Public holidays in Rwanda
- Public holidays in Saint Kitts and Nevis
- Public holidays in Saint Lucia
- Public holidays in Saint Vincent and the Grenadines
- Public holidays in Samoa
- Public holidays in San Marino
- Public holidays in São Tomé and Príncipe
- Public holidays in Saudi Arabia
- Public holidays in Senegal
- Public holidays in Serbia
- Public holidays in Seychelles
- Public holidays in Sierra Leone
- Public holidays in Singapore
- Public holidays in Slovakia
- Public holidays in Slovenia
- Public holidays in Solomon Islands
- Public holidays in Somalia
- Public holidays in Somaliland
- Public holidays in South Africa
- Public holidays in South Sudan
- Public holidays in Spain
- Public holidays in Sri Lanka
- Public holidays in Sudan
- Public holidays in Suriname
- Public holidays in Sweden
- Public holidays in Switzerland
- Public holidays in Syria
- Public holidays in Taiwan
- Public holidays in Tajikistan
- Public holidays in Tanzania
- Public holidays in Thailand
- Public holidays in Togo
- Public holidays in Tonga
- Public holidays in Trinidad and Tobago
- Public holidays in Tunisia
- Public holidays in Turkey
  - Public holidays in Northern Cyprus
- Public holidays in Turkmenistan
- Public holidays in Tuvalu
- Public holidays in Uganda
- Public holidays in Ukraine
- Public holidays in the United Arab Emirates
- Public holidays in the United Kingdom
  - Public holidays in Anguilla
  - Public holidays in Bermuda
  - Public holidays in the British Virgin Islands
  - Public holidays in the Cayman Islands
  - Public holidays in Gibraltar
  - Public holidays in the Falkland Islands
  - Public holidays in Montserrat
  - Public holidays in Saint Helena, Ascension and Tristan da Cunha
  - Public holidays in the Turks and Caicos Islands
- Public holidays in the United States
  - Public holidays in Guam
  - Public holidays in Puerto Rico
  - Public holidays in the United States Virgin Islands
- Public holidays in Uruguay
- Public holidays in Uzbekistan
- Public holidays in Vanuatu
- Public holidays in Vatican City
- Public holidays in Venezuela
- Public holidays in Vietnam
- Public holidays in Yemen
- Public holidays in Zambia
- Public holidays in Zimbabwe

== Former countries ==
- Public holidays in Rhodesia
- Public holidays in the Soviet Union
- Public holidays in Yugoslavia

== See also ==
- Public holidays in the European Union
- List of multinational festivals and holidays
- Lists of festivals
- List of countries by number of public holidays
- List of minimum annual leave by country
