= List of minimum annual leave by country =

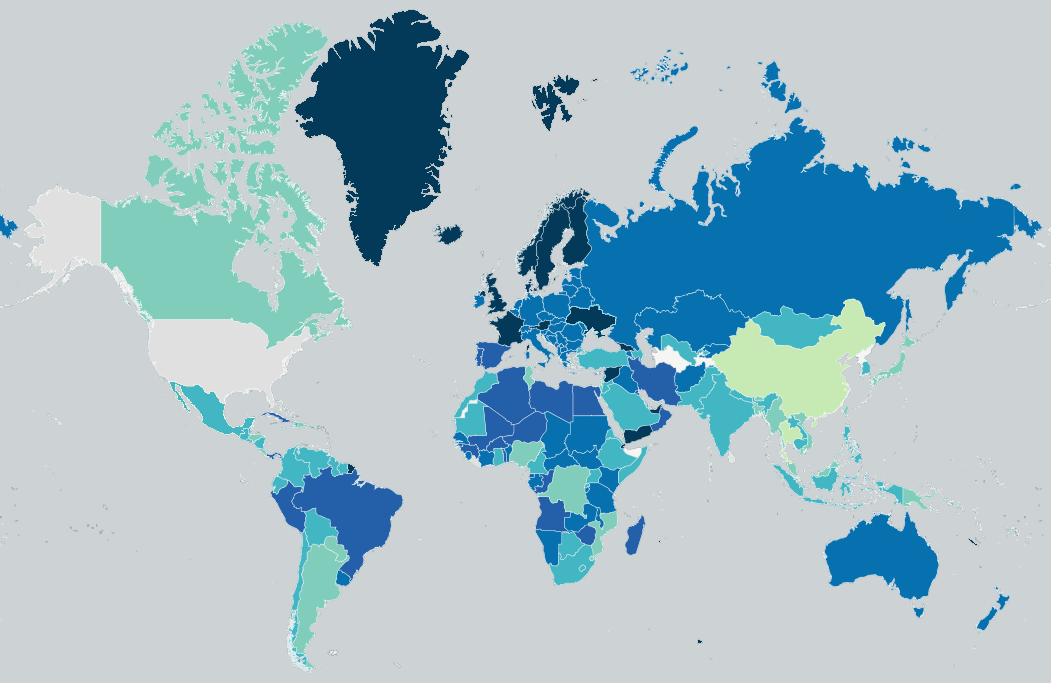
Minimum mandatory paid vacation days, normalized for a five-day workweek: No data; No mandatory vacation; 1–5 days; 6–10 days; 11–15 days; 16–20 days; 21–22 days; 23–28 days

In the majority of nations, including all industrialised nations except the United States, advances in employee relations have seen the introduction of statutory agreements for minimum employee leave from work—that is the amount of entitlement to paid vacation and public holidays. Companies may offer contractually more time. Companies and the law may also differ as to whether public holidays are counted as part of the minimum leave.

Disparities in national minimums are still subject of debate regarding work-life balance and perceived differences between nations. These numbers usually refer to full-time employment – part-time workers may get a reduced number of days. In most countries, public holidays are paid and usually not considered part of the annual leave. Also, in most countries there are additional paid leave benefits such as parental leave and sick leave that are not listed here.

== Methodology ==
For the purpose of comparison, the paid vacation column has been normalised to a five-day workweek. For instance, a calendar month is divided by seven and multiplied by five, while a six-day workweek day is divided by six and multiplied by five. The paid vacation column gives the minimum mandatory vacation days for an employee who has one year of service with the same employer.

In some countries, the public holidays are strictly bound to the calendar dates, so if they happen on Saturday or Sunday, they are "lost" for that year. As a result, the average number of paid extra free days can be lower than the table shows. For example, in the Czech Republic, where the official number of paid public holidays is 13, the average number of public holidays during working days in the years 2000–2016 was only 8.9 days. In other countries, such as the United Kingdom and the United States, the public holidays which would fall on Saturday or Sunday are moved to the nearest Monday or Friday.

== Countries ==
Country	Paid vacation days by year (five-day workweek)	Paid public holidays (bank holidays)	Total paid leave (five-day workweek)	Notes
Afghanistan	20	15	35	Employees are entitled to 20 days recreational leave and 15 paid public holidays.
Albania	28	12	40	Employees are entitled to 28 days of annual leave and 12 paid public holidays.
Algeria	30	11	41	The paid annual leave is calculated on the basis of 2.5 days per month of work. The total duration of the leave cannot, however, exceed 30 calendar days per year. Every employee is also entitled to 11 paid public holidays.
Andorra	31	14	45	Workers are entitled to 31 calendar days of paid leave after one year of employment. Before that, entitlement to leave is 2.5 days for every month worked. One period of leave must last two weeks or more, to allow an uninterrupted rest period. Every employee is also entitled to 14 paid public holidays.
Angola	22	11	33	The annual leave for workers is 22 days, not including weekends, complementary weekly rest days and holidays in this calculation. Every employee is also entitled to 11 paid public holidays.
Antigua and Barbuda	12	11	23	The annual leave for an employee who has successfully passed his probationary period is at least one day per month of employment; 12 days per year of work performed. Every employee is also entitled to 11 paid public holidays.
Argentina	10	19	29	14 calendar days (10 working days, from 6 months to 5 years seniority), 21 calendar days (15 working days, from 5 to 10 years), 28 calendar days (20 working days, from 10 to 20 years) and 35 calendar days (25 working days, from 20 years). Employers can decide unilaterally when the leave days are taken. Every employee is also entitled to 15 paid public holidays and every year the government adds a few more holidays known as "bridge holidays" which means that a holiday last two days.
Armenia	20	12	36	Generally, the duration of annual leave is 20 working days. Extended annual leave up to 25 working days is granted to certain categories of employees whose work involves great nervous, emotional and intellectual strain and professional risk. Every employee is also entitled to 12 paid public holidays.
Australia	20	10	30	An employee is entitled to a minimum of 4 weeks of paid annual leave, unless the employee is a shift-worker, in which case they are entitled to a minimum of 5 weeks of paid annual leave. Every employee is also entitled to 10 to 13 paid public holidays depending on the state and territory. Long service leave, which varies by jurisdiction, is also available to long-standing employees.
Austria	25	13	38	Employees with fewer than 25 years of service are entitled to 25 days of annual leave. Employees who have been with the same firm for 25 years or more are entitled to 30 days of annual leave. Every employee is also entitled to 13 paid public holidays.
Azerbaijan	21	19	40	Employees are entitled to a minimum of 21 basic calendar days of annual leave. Skilled employees, experts and senior employees are entitled to 30 basic calendar days of annual leave. Additional 2 days accrue on top of basic vacation every 5 years. Every employee is also entitled to 19 paid public holidays.
Bahamas	10	10	20	14 days after 1 year employment, 21 days after 7 years of employment. Every employee is also entitled to 10 paid public holidays.
Bahrain	30	14	44	An employee who has been in the service of an employer for at least one year is entitled to a paid annual leave not less than thirty days, with an average of 2.5 days for each month. Every employee is also entitled to 14 paid public holidays.
Bangladesh	10	11	21	All workers except tea plantation workers are entitled to 10 days of paid casual leave in each calendar year. An adult worker is entitled to: (a) for shop, commercial or industrial establishment, factory, or road transport service industry workers – one day's paid annual leave per 18 days of work; (b) for tea plantation workers – one day's paid annual leave per 22 days of work; and (c) for newspaper workers – one day's paid annual leave per 11 days of work. Every worker is also entitled to 11 paid public holidays.
Barbados	15	–	15	An employee who completes a year of employment with an employer is entitled to – (a) an annual holiday of not less than 3 weeks where he has been in the employment of that employer for less than 5 years; and (b) an annual holiday of not less than 4 weeks where he has been in the service of that employer for 5 years or more.
Belarus	24	9	33	The length of basic annual leave is 24 calendar days. Plus 3 calendar days might be granted in addition for long time employment. Every employee is also entitled to 9 paid public holidays.
Belgium	20	10	30	Before 2012, a worker after one year of full employment is entitled to: 24 working days if they work 6 days per week; and 20 working days if they work 5 days per week. This was challenged by the EU. From June 2012, workers are allowed to take holidays in their first year of employment. Workers are also entitled to 10 paid public holidays.
Belize	14	13	27	Every employee is entitled to two weeks paid leave after a year of employment. If employment is terminated after three months but before a year, the employee must be paid average vacation pay. Every employee is also entitled to 13 paid public holidays.
Benin	24	13	37	Unless there are more favorable provisions in collective agreements or employment contracts, the worker acquires the right to leave, to be paid by the employer, at the rate of 2 working days per month of effective service. A working days is every day other than the day of weekly rest period and holidays. Every worker is also entitled to 13 paid public holidays.
Bhutan	9	–	9	
Bolivia	15/20/30	11	26/31/41	There are different scales of annual leave depending on the seniority of the worker: workers with from 1 to 5 years of service are entitled to 15 working days; from 5 to 10 years: 20 working days; and from 10 years onwards: 30 working days. Every worker is also entitled to 11 paid public holidays.
Bosnia and Herzegovina	20–30	9–11	29–41	Bosnia and Herzegovina's entities, Republika Srpska and the Federation of Bosnia and Herzegovina, as well as Brčko District, have different work laws. Both entities have a minimum of 20 working days off, while the number of additional days varies. In Brčko District, workers have 18 days off. In Republika Srpska workers have additional 1 day for every 5 years of work with the same employer and an additional 2 days for religious holidays. In the Federation of Bosnia and Herzegovina workers have 2 paid days for religious holidays and, optionally, 2 unpaid days for religious holidays. The number of public holidays also varies: in Republika Srpska around 11, in the Federation of Bosnia and Herzegovina around 10 and in Brčko District around 9. The number of public holidays varies based on the predominant religious group in the entity. The Federation of Bosnia and Herzegovina consists of 10 cantons, any of which can have their own laws that can affect the number of public holidays.
Botswana	15	14	29	Every employer is required to grant to all employees leave with basic pay at the rate of not less than 1.25 days per month. Every employee is also entitled to 14 paid public holidays.
Brazil	10/14/18/22	13	23/27/31/35	The length of annual leave depends on the number of days of absence from work: 30 calendar days (22 working days, based on a 5-day workweek) if the worker was absent no more than 5 days; 24 calendar days (18 working days) if the worker was absent between 6 and 14 days; 18 calendar days (14 working days) if the worker was absent between 15 and 23 days; 12 calendar days (10 working days) if the worker was absent between 24 and 32 days. Every employee is also entitled to 8 national paid public holidays, 1 state paid holiday, and up to 4 religious municipal paid holidays.
Brunei	7	11	18	[11]
Bulgaria	20	12	32	An employee has the right to paid annual leave of at least four weeks for each calendar year. If a public holiday falls on Saturday or Sunday, the following Monday is a holiday.
Burkina Faso	30	15	45	The employee has a right to a paid leave chargeable to the employer, at 2.5 calendar days per month of effective service. Every employee is also entitled to 15 paid public holidays.
Burundi	17	13	30	Workers are entitled to 1 and 2/3 working days per month of completed of service. Every employee is also entitled to 13 paid public holidays.
Cape Verde	22	0	22	Every worker in an employment contract for an indeterminate period is entitled to twenty-two days of annual leave. There are no legal provisions for pay on public holidays.
Cambodia	18	27	45	All workers are entitled to paid annual leave at the rate of 1.5 work days per month of continuous service. However, the length of paid leave entitlement shall be increased according to seniority, at the rate of one day per 3 years of service. Every employee is also entitled to 27 paid public holidays.
Cameroon	18	–	18	Workers acquire the right to annual leave at the rate of one and a half days per month of effective service, paid by the employer.
Canada	10–20	7–13	17–33	In Canada, vacation time is set by the provinces and territories for all employees except federal employees and employees of federally-regulated industries such as telecommunications. Employees are entitled to start out with two weeks of paid vacation in all provinces except Saskatchewan where employees are entitled to three weeks of paid annual leave. Ten provinces and territories grant a third week of vacation after working for a set period of time, one grants a fourth week, and two grant no additional extension. Federal employees are entitled initially to three weeks vacation, increasing to four weeks after eight years of service. In addition, employees are entitled to 7–13 paid public holidays depending on the province.
Central African Republic	24	–	24	Workers are entitled to leave at the rate of 2 working days per month worked.
Chad	24	3	27	Workers are entitled to two days per month of paid leave - to be paid by the employer. One month of effective work is the period equivalent to 4 weeks or 24 days of work. Every worker is also entitled to 3 paid public holidays.
Chile	15	15	30	The duration of the annual leave is 15 working days. Every worker is also entitled to 15 paid public holidays.
China	5/10/15	13	18/23/28	The duration of the annual leave entitlement is: (a) 5 days for employees who have accumulatively worked for 1 to 10 years; (b) 10 days for employees who have accumulatively worked for 10 to 20 years; and (c) 15 days for employees who have accumulatively worked for more than 20 years. Employers who offer more vacation time are legally obligated to grant it. Every worker is also entitled to 13 paid public holidays, which includes two semi-annual one-week holidays known as the Golden Weeks.
Colombia	15	18	33	Employees are entitled to 15 consecutive working days of paid annual leave. Every employee is also entitled to 18 paid public holidays.
Comoros	25	–	25	Workers are entitled to annual leave at the rate of at least 2 and half days per month of work. In order to determine the duration of the leave, it shall be considered as a month of work, the period equivalent to 4 weeks or 24 days of work.
DR Congo	12	–	12	The duration of annual leave has to be at least one day for every month of effective service, for worker over the age of 18. It shall be of at least one and a half day for workers under the age of 18. It shall be increased of one day per month every 5 years of seniority in the same employer or replaced employer.
Congo	26	–	26	Workers are entitled, after one year of service, to 26 working days of annual leave paid by the employer.
Costa Rica	10	9	19	Employees are entitled to 2 weeks minimum of annual leave after 50 weeks of work performed with the same employer. Every employee is also entitled to 9 paid public holidays.
Croatia	20	13	33	An employee has the right to paid annual leave in the duration of at least four weeks for each calendar year and 13 paid public holidays.
Cuba	22	9	33	Every worker is entitled to enjoy one month of paid annual leave after 11 months of effective work. Workers are also entitled to 9 paid public holidays.
Cyprus	20	14	34	20 working days of leave for workers on a five-day week and 24 working days of leave for workers on a six-day week over a period of one year's employment. Every employee is also entitled to 14 paid public holidays.
Czech Republic	20	13	33	The basic vacation allowance is a minimum of four weeks per calendar year and there are 13 paid public holidays. Many employers give one week extra (so the total is five weeks of paid annual leave) as a bonus. Public holidays which happen on Saturday or Sunday are lost for the particular year – thus the average number of public holidays during working days in the years 2000 to 2016 was only 8.9 days. Employees of employers who are not part of the private sector or engaged in non-commercial activities are entitled to a vacation allowance of 5 weeks. Teachers and the academic staff of higher education institutions are entitled to a vacation allowance of 8 weeks per calendar year.
Denmark	25/30	10	35/40	Employees are entitled to 25 days of annual leave per year worked, prorated at 2.08 days per month. In addition many employees have an extra week of holiday through the Additional Sixth Week agreement. Every employee is also entitled to 10 paid public holidays.
Djibouti	25	10	35	Employees are entitled to two and half working days of paid leave per month. Every employee is also entitled to 10 paid public holidays.
Dominica	10	12	22	Employees are entitled under five years of continuously service two weeks paid annual leave, and for five years and over of continuously service three weeks of paid annual leave. Every employee is also entitled to 12 paid public holidays.
Dominican Republic	10	13	23	The employer shall provide every employee a paid vacation period of two weeks, according to the following scale: After a period of at least 1 year and up to 5 years, 14 days with full pay; After a continuous period of work of not less than 5 years, 18 days with full pay. Every employee is also entitled to 13 paid public holidays.
Ecuador	11	12	23	Every worker shall be entitled to enjoy 15 consecutive days of paid annual leave, including the non working days. Every employee is also entitled to 12 paid public holidays.
Egypt	21	17	34	Employees are entitled to 21 days of paid annual leave, though they must wait six months before taking their first day off. After five consecutive years of employment, an employee may take one month of paid leave to make a religious pilgrimage. An employee's paid leave entitlement increases to 30 days of paid annual leave after 10 years of employment or when the employee reaches the age of 50, whichever one comes first. Every employee is also entitled to 17 paid public holidays.
El Salvador	15	11	26	The length of annual leave is 15 days. Every employee is also entitled to 11 paid public holidays.
Equatorial Guinea	30	–	30	Workers are entitled to one month of paid annual leave, for each year of continuous work. After 10 years of service, annual leave shall be increased one day per year worked.
Eritrea	12	–	12	An employee is entitled to annual leave with pay amounting to: fourteen working days for the first year of service; and fourteen working days plus one working each additional year of service. Annual leave may not exceed 35 working days.
Estonia	28	12	40	Minimum annual holiday is 28 calendar days, unless the employee and the employer have agreed on a longer period, or unless otherwise provided by law. Every employee is also entitled to 12 paid public holidays.
Ethiopia	12	13	25	Employees are entitled to no less than 14 working days of annual leave for the first one year of service, and 14 working days plus one working day for every additional year of service. Every employee is also entitled to 13 paid public holidays.
European Union	28	0	28	The European Union is not a country but a supranational body. EU legislation mandates that all 27 member states must by law grant all employees a minimum of "at least four weeks" of paid vacation. A "week" is defined as a "seven-day period". All Member States have at least 28 days or more of paid holiday.
Fiji	10	12	22	Workers are entitled to 10 days paid annual leave for each complete year of service. Every employee is also entitled to 12 paid public holidays.
Finland	25	11	36	5 weeks (30 days with Saturdays sometimes, but not Sundays, counted as holidays) is the minimum mandated annual leave by law. Workers are also entitled to 11 paid public holidays on average. After working for the same company for a long period, many employers raise the 30 to 36 days (so-called long holidays). (Many employers in Finland give a holiday bonus (lomaraha) every year; this holiday bonus can be converted to extra holiday - giving another 13 days of holiday (or 18 days for those on 'long' holidays).
France	25	11	35	5 weeks (30 days with Saturdays, but not Sundays counted as holidays). Some employees may convert extra hours (over standard 35 hours per weeks) into 0 up to 22 RTT days (Réduction du Temps de Travail, English: Reduction of Working Time). Furthermore, there are 11 public holidays but all are not paid as they may fall on unpaid weekends days. You also have to work an extra day for free, which is called the "Solidarity Day" "Journée de solidarité" which come in deduction from the total paid holidays.
Gabon	20	14	34	Workers are entitled to leave, to be paid by the employer, of 2 working days per month of effective service. The workers under the age of 18 are entitled to 2 and a half working days. Every worker is also entitled to 14 paid public holidays.
Gambia	21	–	21	
Georgia	24	15	39	
Germany	20	10	30	24 working days (defined as all calendar days that are not Sundays or public holidays). Therefore, a worker with a 5-day workweek has the right to 20 days off. However, it is quite customary that companies concede other 10 days of paid leave, bringing the average to 30 days off. There is one national public holiday (German Unity Day). States regulate the remaining paid public holidays which vary between 10 and 13 in total, some of them being held nationwide. The Catholic parts of Bavaria (around 1,700 communities in the Land of Bavaria, including the major cities of Munich and Augsburg, but not Nuremberg) provide the most rest days with 13 public holidays. The Bavarian city of Augsburg is a special case as it has 14 public holidays as it celebrates Friedensfest (Peace Festival) in addition to the 13 holidays in Catholic Bavaria. Civil employees receive a minimum of 30 days after a law against age discrimination was passed in 2012. In most states, most employees are additionally entitled to 5 days per year paid education leave (Bildungsurlaub).
Ghana	15	13	28	In any undertaking every worker is entitled to not less than 15 working days leave with full pay in any calendar year of continuous service. Every worker is also entitled to 13 paid public holidays.
Greece	20	9	29	Workers on a five-day week are entitled to a 20 working days or 24 working days for six-day week workers. The leave entitlement is increased by one working day for each year of employment in addition to the first year, up to 26 working days, or up to 22 working days if the undertaking operates a five-day week. There are 9 mandatory paid public holidays plus one town/city specific "patron saint day" which may or may not be a public holiday depending on the decision of the local administration.
Grenada	10	13	23	Workers are entitled to a period of annual leave with pay of not less than two weeks during the first year of employment and thereafter, three weeks. Every worker is also entitled to 13 paid public holidays.
Guatemala	15	10	25	Employees are entitled to have at least 15 working days of vacations. To have the right for vacations the worker must have at least 150 calendar days of continuous work. It is forbidden for a worker to accept extra payment instead of the vacations nor take another job during this time. Vacations must be paid in advance. Every employee is also entitled to 10 paid public holidays.
Guinea	22	11	33	The employee is entitled to leave, paid by the employer, at a rate of 2 and half days per month of effective service. Employees are also entitled to 11 paid public holidays.
Guinea-Bissau	22	–	22	The annual leave shall be of 30 consecutive days, not counting weekly rest periods nor initial or final holidays.
Guyana	12	0	12	Every worker being in employment shall be allowed a period of holidays with pay of not less than one day for each completed month of employment computed from the date of engagement. There are no legal provisions for pay on public holidays
Haiti	11	16	27	Any employee continuously working upon one year of service is entitled to paid leave of at least 15 consecutive days, comprising 13 working days and two Sundays. Public holidays and interruptions of work due to sickness or maternity enjoyed by the worker should not be deducted from the fifteen days off. Employees are also entitled to 16 paid public holidays.
Honduras	8	11	19	The period of annual leave differs in relation to the time of work performed with the same employer: 10 consecutive working days after one year of service; 12 consecutive working days after two years' consecutive service; 15 consecutive working days after three years' consecutive service; 20 consecutive working days after four or more years' consecutive service. Employees are also entitled to 11 paid public holidays.
Hong Kong	7–14	17	24–31	7 days (1 to 2 years), add one day per year until 14 days (3+ years). Employees are also entitled to 17 paid employee holidays.
Hungary	20	13	33	20 working days (increasing up to 30 with age). The employee will get additional days for children. Two days for one child, 4 days for two children and 7 days for more than two children. Employees are also entitled to 13 paid public holidays, however public holidays which happen on Saturday or Sunday are lost for the particular year. Unpaid leave can be requested by the Employee that can be granted upon after Employer deliberation. Employee has a right for Unpaid leave under the following circumstances: Caring for child under 3 years (usually during maternity leave), caring for children under 10 years if it is necessary and the Employee receives child caring aid, long term caring for a relative up to a maximum of 2 years (requires official medical verification), volunteer reservist military service.
Iceland	24	14	38	The legislation provides for a minimum of two working days of holiday for each month in employment during the past holiday allowance year (1 May to 30 April). The minimum holiday for each year is therefore 24 working days. Employees are also entitled to 12 paid public holidays.
India	25	10	35	People working in India are entitled to 18 vacation days a year along with an additional 7 days of casual leaves, totaling to 25 a year. The number of vacation leaves and casual leaves may differ as long as the total number remains at least 25. This does not apply to employees of government-owned companies, who are governed by a separate set of leave entitlements decided by the government. Leave entitlements in India generally vary among states and industries, with local governments setting minimum leave entitlements and individual companies offering their own paid leave benefits. On average, Indians receive 27 days of paid leave a year. Employees are also entitled to 10 - 15 paid public holidays, depending on the region.
Indonesia	12	18	30	Employees are entitled to a minimum of 12 days paid leave. They are also entitled to 18 public holidays. Public workers are entitled to 9 days of joint holiday (cuti bersama), whereas private employers can choose to follow joint holidays. After six years employment, employees are entitled to a month's worth of leave in their seventh and eighth year. There are no legal provisions for pay on public holidays.
Iran	26	27	53	The annual paid leave entitlement is one month, including four Fridays. But the workweek in Iran is six days, and the total number of weekends is half of most other countries.
Iraq	20	–	20	A worker shall have a right to 20 days of leave for each year of work. A worker employed in work which is arduous or harmful to health shall have a right to 30 days of paid leave for each year of work. The length of a worker's annual leave shall be increased by 2 days after every additional 5 years of continuous service with the same employer.
Ireland	20	10	30	Employees are entitled to 4 weeks of paid annual leave and 10 paid public holidays.
Israel	12	9	21	A minimum of 12 days for employees with a five-day workweek and 14 days for employees with a six-day workweek. Following four years of employment, the number of vacation days rises by two per year. An employee can accumulate a maximum of 28 vacation days under the law. There are also 9 paid public holidays, and 4 holidays where, despite not being mandatory, many businesses and government offices offer collective or optional paid leave.
Italy	20	12	32	At least 20 working days (exact number depends on contract details, all national category-specific contracts guarantee 28 days), entirely paid, plus up to 104 hours of ROL, that means the reduction of working time (in Italian Riduzione Orario di Lavoro), that have to be used primarily in blocks of a few hours each time for family/personal needs (for example taking a child to the doctor, going to the bank etc.) but may be utilized as well, just for the unused part of them and just if the company/the collective contract allows that, to get additional vacation hours/days, or to shorten of 1 or 2 hours the working day on Fridays. Employees also receive 12 paid public holidays, plus one town/city specific "patron saint day". Workers also have a right to 15 days of paid leave for their wedding. Employees have the right to paid leave to deal with sick children up to 3 years, or unpaid leave for older ones. A special provision allows people who are in charge of disabled children or relatives to have more days of paid leave.
Ivory Coast	20	14	34	The worker is entitled to annual leave, paid by the employer, at the rate of 2 working days per month of effective service. Young workers under the age of 18 are entitled to two and 2/10 working days per month of effective service. The annual leave is increased at the rate of 2 days after 15 years of seniority in the same company; 4 days after 20 years of seniority in the same company; 6 days after 25 years of seniority in the same company; and 8 days after 30 years of seniority in the same company. Employees also receive 14 paid public holidays.
Jamaica	10	–	10	Workers who have worked up to 220 days enjoy 10 days maximum (if they have worked for a minimum of 110 days) calculated as follows; 1/22 of the number of days of work. Any fraction of a day of holiday shall be reckoned as 1 day. For workers who have worked more than 220 days: 2 working weeks. For workers with 10 years of service or more and who have worked more than 220 days in each qualifying year: 3 working weeks.
Japan	10–20	0	10–20	The initial annual leave entitlement is 10 days of leave. Workers who have been employed continuously for at least one and half years shall be granted one additional day of leave for each year of service, up to a maximum of 20 days of leave. There are no legal provisions for pay on public holidays. However Japan does have 16 national public holidays established by the Public Holiday Law.
Jersey	10	9	19	Employees are entitled to two weeks of paid annual leave. Employees are also entitled to 9 paid public holidays.
Jordan	14	10–14	24–28	Each employee shall be entitled to an annual leave with full pay for fourteen 14 days per each year of service, increased to 21 days after five years of service.
Kazakhstan	24	16	40	Employees are entitled to 24 calendar days of paid annual leave.
Kenya	21	10	31	An employee is entitled to not less than 21 working days after every 12 consecutive months of service with his employer. Where employment is terminated after then completion of two or more consecutive months of service during any 12 months of leave-earning period, to not less than 1.75 days of leave for each completed month of service. Employees are also entitled to 10 paid public holidays.
Kiribati	30	16	46	For each completed year of service, an employee is entitled to 30 days of paid annual leave, 20 days of paid sick leave, and 3 days of paid compassionate leave. An employee is entitled to be absent from their employment (with pay) on a day designated by law to be a public holiday.
Kosovo	20	12	32	Labor Law mandates at least 20 days of paid annual leave during a calendar year. In addition, employees get one additional day of paid annual leave for every 5 years of service, whereas civil servants get one day of annual leave for every 2 years of service. Employees are entitled to 12 paid days of public holidays. If public holidays fall on Saturday or Sunday, the following working day is a non-working day.
Kuwait	30	13	43	Every worker is entitled to enjoy a paid annual leave of 30 days. In addition, the worker who completes 2 continuous years in the service of his employer shall be entitled to a paid leave of 21 days for performing Haj rituals, provided that he should not have previously performed the Haj. Workers are also entitled to 13 paid public holidays.
Kyrgyzstan	20	–	20	
Laos	15	–	15	The general annual leave entitlement is 15 days of leave per year.
Latvia	20	12	32	Employees are entitled to 4 calendar weeks of paid annual leave.
Lebanon	15	22	37	Every wage-earner or salary-earner employed in an establishment for at least one year is entitled to an annual leave of 15 days with full pay. Workers are also entitled to 22 days of public holidays
Lesotho	12	10	22	An employee shall be entitled to one working day of holiday in respect of each month of continuous employment with the same employer, i.e. a minimum of 12 working days of holiday in each year. Employees are also entitled to 10 paid public holidays.
Liberia	10	11	21	Employees are entitled to: (a) For continuous service with the same employer for twenty-four months, the number of working days in two weeks, and thereafter for each additional twelve months, with the same employer, the number of working days in three weeks; and (b) For continuous service with the same employer for sixty months and thereafter, the number of working days in four weeks. Employees are also entitled to 11 paid public holidays.
Libya	22	–	22	Every worker is entitled annually to 30 days leave. Workers who have reached the age of 50 or have completed 20 years of service are entitled 45 days.
Lithuania	20	14	34	Employees are entitled to 20 working days of paid annual leave. Employees are also entitled to 14 paid public holidays.
Luxembourg	26–36 (Private sector: 26; Public sector: 32; Age 50–54: 34; Age 55+: 36)	11	37–47	The legal duration of annual leave is 26 working days per year for private sector employees. Public sector employees are entitled to 32 days per year, increasing to 34 from age 50 and 36 from age 55. Employees (both public and private sector) with specific disabilities are entitled to a further 6 days' annual leave. All workers are also entitled to 11 paid public holidays. Civil servants are also entitled to two additional half-days of public holidays. Extraordinary paid leave – which is not deducted from the annual leave allowance if taken – is granted in certain personal circumstances. In some cases, the number of days granted depends on whether an employee works in the public or private sector. Leave taken in the event of a death also applies if it is a relative of the employee's spouse or civil partner who has died: e.g. the death of an employee's mother-in-law entitles the employee to 3 days' leave.
Madagascar	22	13	35	Workers are entitled to leave paid by the employer at 2.5 days per month and also to 13 paid public holidays.
Malawi	18	–	18	
Malaysia	8	11	19	Starts at 8 days per year for first 2 years employment with an employer. Increases to 12 days per year for between 2 and 5 years employment and 16 days per year for 5 or more years. Employees are also entitled to 11 paid public holidays in Peninsular Malaysia and Labuan, 14 days in Sabah and 16 days in Sarawak. In addition to the federal public holidays, each state and federal territory has designated four to six state public holidays, bringing the total number of (federal and state) public holidays to 19 days in Labuan, Penang, Sabah and Sarawak and 18 days in the rest of the country.
Maldives	22	–	22	
Mali	22	–	22	
Malta	27	14	41	Every worker is entitled to paid annual leave of at least the equivalent in hours of five weeks and one working day calculated on the basis of a 40-hour working week and 8-hour working day. Workers are also entitled to 14 paid public holidays.
Marshall Islands	26	11	37	There are 11 public holidays in the Marshall Islands. Employees are entitled to annual leave based on their length of service. The accrual rates vary depending on workweek hours. For instance, employees working a 40-hour workweek accrue 8 hours of annual leave per pay period, while those working a 60-hour workweek accrue 12 hours of annual leave per pay period. The maximum annual leave employees can accrue is 26 working days.
Mauritania	15	7	22	After the reference period of 12 months, a worker is entitled to 1.5 days of leave per month of effective service. An exception is 3 days per month for employees whose normal residence is not in Mauritania. One additional day annual leave is granted for 10 to 15 years of seniority, two additional days for 15 to 20 years seniority and 3 days for a seniority exceeding 20 years. Employees are also entitled to 7 paid public holidays.
Mauritius	22	16	38	Every worker, other than a part-time worker, who remains in continuous employment with the same employer for a period of 12 consecutive months is entitled, during each subsequent period of 12 months while he remains in continuous employment, to 20 working days of annual leave or such similar leave under any other name. Besides that every worker is entitled to an extra 2 days of leave in every year and 16 paid public holidays.
Mexico	12	7	19	Employers are legally obligated to grant employees 12 working days as minimum, after one year of service with the same employer. This duration shall be increased by two working days (up to a maximum of 20) for each subsequent year of service. After the sixth year, the vacation period shall be increased by two days for every five years of service. Workers who perform discontinuous and seasonal work are entitled to an annual holiday period in proportion to the number of the working days performed in the year. Employees are also entitled to 7 paid public holidays.
Micronesia	0	–	0	
Moldova	28	14*	42	All employees have the right to an annual paid holiday, with duration of not less than 28 calendar days without taking into account the non working holidays. Employees of special sectors (education, health service, public service, etc.) can be granted annual leave of a different duration. There are 14 public (non working) holidays in Moldova. If they don't coincide with a regular time off, the employee is entitled to full pay. Workers almost never get the full 14 holidays off, as they often overlap with rest day, for example, as Easter is always on a Sunday, most workers wouldn't get it as a paid holiday.
Mongolia	15	0	15	15 working days for the 1 year of employment. Increase up to 29 working days after 32 years of employment. 48 working days paid vacation for teachers and professors for all levels of school, kindergarten and university regardless of the number of years of service. There are no identified legal provisions for pay on public holidays.
Montenegro	20	16	36	20 working days is legal vacation minimum. Vacation days are extended by 1 when employees get 5, 15 and 25 years of total working experience, up to total of 23 working days. Employers may offer additional vacation days through Collective agreements or internal acts. There are 10 free days for five bank holidays, 2 days each, and additional 6 days for religious holidays, according to employee's religion.
Morocco	15	13	25	Every employee, having worked at least 6 months continuously in the same company, is entitled to paid annual leave as it follows: 1 and 1/2 day of effective work for every month of service; and 2 days of effective work for every month of service for those aged under 18. The paid annual leave is increased in one and a half day of effective work for an entire period, continue or not, of 5 years of service. However, this increase cannot be accumulated when the total annual leave has reached the limit of 30 working days. An "effective day of work" day is that which is not a weekly rest day, a holiday and general holidays of the company. The working month is defined as: 26 effective working days or 191 working hours in the non agricultural sector or 208 in the agricultural sector. Employees are also entitled to 13 paid public holidays.
Mozambique	10	9	19	Employees are entitled to one day for every month of actual service, during the first year of service; two days for every month of actual service, during the second year of service; and thirty days for every year of actual service, from the third year onward. Employees are also entitled to 9 paid public holidays.
Myanmar	10	14	24	Employees over the age of 15 are entitled to 10 consecutive days of leave per year. Employees under the age of 15 are entitled to 14 consecutive days leave per year. Employees are also entitled to 14 paid public holidays.
Namibia	20	–	20	Every employee is entitled to at least four consecutive weeks annual leave in respect of each annual leave cycle (which means the period of 12 consecutive months employment with the same employer immediately following an employee's commencement of employment or the completion of the last annual leave cycle). If the number of days in an ordinary workweek are 6 the annual leave entitlement in working days is 24.
Nauru	0	–	0	No paid annual leave.
Nepal	15	13	28	Every employee is entitled to paid home leave at the rate of 1 day for every 20 days worked. Employees are also entitled to 13 paid public holidays.
Netherlands	20	11	31	Workers are entitled to four times the number of days they work per week. In this respect, for a five-day working week the worker is entitled to 20 days of annual leave. A 1984 Decree creates 11 public holidays per year.
New Zealand	20	12	32	Employees are entitled to not less than 4 weeks of paid annual holiday. Employees are also entitled to 12 paid public holidays.
Nicaragua	11	9	20	Every worker is entitled to enjoy 15 days of continuous and remunerated annual leave after 6 months of uninterrupted work with the same employer. Workers are also entitled to 9 paid public holidays.
Niger	30	12	42	Workers are entitled to 30 calendar days (two and a half calendar days per month of work). Seniority entitles a worker to additional days of leave: 2 additional days after 20 years with the same enterprise; 4 additional days after 25 years; 6 additional days after 30 years. Workers are also entitled to 12 paid public holidays.
Nigeria	5	–	5	Every worker is entitled after twelve months continuous service to a holiday with full pay of at least six working days. Most employees in both public sector and private firms are entitled to 20 vacation days per year. This is exclusive of the National and Religious holidays which can be as a high as 12 days in a year as both Muslims and Christians get days off for festivities regardless of which religion was celebrating.
North Macedonia	20	12	32	Employees are entitled to 20 to 26 working days, as specified in a collective agreement in accordance with years of service and working conditions; 3 additional days for older workers. There are 12 public holidays for all citizens. More public holidays available based on which religion or ethnic group they are a part of.
Norway	25	10	35	Employers are required that employees have 25 working days of leave in connection with holidays each holiday year. Holiday leave is accrued from previous full year of employment, i.e. in the first year of employment, a worker is entitled to 25 working days of leave, but they will be unpaid. After one year of full employment, the employee shall be entitled to 25 working days of paid holidays. Employees over the age of 60 are entitled to 30 days. All days count as working days except Sundays and statutory church or public holidays.
Oman	22	9	31	Employees are entitled to 30 days of annual leave and are also entitled to 9 paid public holidays.
Pakistan	20	15	35	Factory workers, employees of commercial establishments, and road transportation workers are entitled to 14 days of holidays, inclusive of weekly rest days, provided they complete a full year of continuous employment. Those who spend more than 90 days on sickness, accident, or authorized leave, and one day or more on unauthorized leave or on an illegal strike lose this entitlement. Mine workers are entitled to one day of leave for every 17 days of work below ground and one day for every 20 days worked above ground, generally amounting to more than 14 days. Newspaper employees are not entitled to a fixed set of days by law, but rather to paid leave lasting at least 1/11th as long as they spend on duty. Factory workers are also entitled to 17 paid public holidays. On average, corporations and government offices provide at least 15 paid public holidays per year.
Palau	0	–	0	
Panama	30	10	40	Employees are entitled to enjoy 30 days of annual leave and are also entitled to 10 paid public holidays.
Papua New Guinea	10	9	19	Employees are entitled to 14 consecutive days of annual leave, including non-working days. Employees are also entitled to 9 paid public holidays.
Paraguay	10	12	22	Every worker shall be entitled to a paid annual leave after a year of work within same employer that shall be at least: a) 12 consecutive working days for workers with less than 5 years of continuous service; b) 18 consecutive working days after 5 years and less than 10 years of continuous service; c) 30 consecutive days after 10 years of continuous service. Employees are also entitled to 12 paid public holidays.
Peru	11-22	12	23-34	Employees are entitled between 15 and 30 calendar days of annual leave, depending on the size of the company they work for. They are also entitled to 12 paid public holidays.
Philippines	5	12	17	Employees are entitled to 5 days of paid service incentive leave per year. Employees are also entitled to 12 paid public holidays.
Poland	26/20	14	39/33	26 working days per year for the majority of the country's workforce - i.e. those with 10 years of education (secondary, tertiary) and/or employment experience. A minority of the workforce who has not completed a total of 10 years of secondary/tertiary education and/or employment has 20 working days per year during the first 10 years of employment and 26 working days thereafter. There's a specific method for counting time spent in secondary and tertiary education towards the 10 year thresholds, ranging from 3 years for basic vocational school, up to 8 years for bachelor's degree. Workers are also entitled to 14 paid public holidays.
Portugal	22	9	31	Workers are entitled to paid holidays which are mandatory and have a minimum duration of 22 working days. Workers are also entitled to 13 paid public holidays. During the first year of admission, workers accrue 2 vacation days per completed month of work, to be enjoyed after 6 months employment. On the following years all 22 days are accrued on January 1. However, when a public holiday is during the weekend, the holiday is not recovered, which means that in all years, a number of these holidays are actually not considered as paid days. Thus, on average the effective paid public holidays are 9.
Puerto Rico	15	0	15	Employees are entitled to 15 days of paid annual leave. There are no legal provisions for pay on public holidays.
Qatar	15	10	25	Annual leave shall not be less than three weeks for the worker whose service is less than five years and four weeks for the worker whose service is more than five years. Workers are also entitled to 10 paid public holidays.
Romania	20	17	37	Workers are entitled to a minimum of 20 days of paid leave per year; 23 for the handicapped, underage, or those working in difficult or dangerous conditions. Varying numbers of extra paid days are available for life events such as marriage or death in the family, child birth (for the partner who is not on paternal/maternal leave), donating blood, or workplace relocation. Workers are also entitled to 17 paid public holidays - however public holidays which happen on Saturday or Sunday are lost for the particular year.; as well as up to 90 days of unpaid leave every year for the purpose of preparation for educational degree exams. Unpaid leave can also be requested for any other reason, but the employer is not legally obligated to agree.
Russia	28–37	14	34–51	Workers are entitled to 28 calendar days of annual leave (if taken in parts, one of them should not be less than 14 days), people working in prescribed Far North and Far East zones have additional 5 to 24 calendar days. 14 paid public holidays. This usually translates into 42 calendar days (66 calendar days in prescribed North territories, which appears to be one of the longest in the world) of leave because most holidays coinciding with weekend days are moved to the following working day.
Rwanda	15	11	26	Employees are entitled to a paid leave at the employer's expenses, on the basis of one and a half working days per month of effective continued work. Official holidays are not considered as part of the annual paid leave. The employee benefits from one working day per year of annual paid leave for every three years of experience in the same institution. However, annual paid leave, in any case, can not exceed twenty one (21) working days. Employees are also entitled to 11 paid public holidays.
Samoa	10	11	21	Employees are entitled to at least 10 days’ paid annual leave to be taken on days mutually agreed between the employer and the employee. Employees are also entitled to 11 paid public holidays.
Saint Kitts and Nevis	12	–	12	Every worker shall be entitled to a paid annual leave of not less than 14 days, after one year of employment. Sundays and public holidays shall not be included in the annual leave period and so this period shall be increased by one day for each Sunday or public holiday occurring therein.
Saint Lucia	14	13	27	Employees are entitled to 14 working days of paid annual leave after a minimum employment of twelve months; after five years employees are entitled to 21 working days. Employees are also entitled to 13 paid public holidays.
Saint Vincent and the Grenadines	16	–	16	
San Marino	10	–	10	All workers are entitled to annual leave with pay, varying from 1 to more than 15 years of service from 10 to 20 days a year for wage earners and from 1 to more than 12 years of service from 10 to 12 days a year for salaried employees and intermediary staff.
São Tomé and Príncipe	25	9	34	Workers are entitled to 30 consecutive days of annual leave, not counting weekly rest periods nor initial or final holidays. Employees are also entitled to 9 paid public holidays.
Saudi Arabia	21	9	30	A worker shall be entitled to a prepaid annual leave of not less than twenty one days, to be increased to a period of not less than thirty days if the worker spends five consecutive years in the service of the employer. Workers are also entitled to 10 paid public holidays.
Senegal	20	12	32	Workers are entitled to 2 days of annual leave for each month of work performed over a year. Employees are also entitled to 12 paid public holidays.
Serbia	20	11	31	20 working days minimum (effectively 4 weeks, law defines working week as 5 working days for purpose of paid vacation), plus 9 bank holidays and up to two more days depending on religion of employee.
Seychelles	21	13	34	A worker is entitled to 21 days of paid annual leave or, where the employment is for less than a year, to 1.75 days for each month of employment, the aggregate number of days being rounded up upon addition to the highest integer.
Sierra Leone	18	–	18	
Singapore	7–14	11	18–25	A worker is entitled to minimum 7 days, with 1 additional day per year up to a maximum of 14 days. No statutory minimum leave for seamen, domestic workers, or employees in managerial or executive positions. Employees are also entitled to 11 paid public holidays.
Slovakia	20–25	14	34	The duration of the paid annual leave is at least four weeks, provided that seven consecutive calendar days is understood as one week paid holiday. Employees are also entitled to 14 paid public holidays.
Slovenia	20	13	33	A worker has the right to annual leave in an individual calendar year, which may not be shorter than 4 weeks, regardless of whether that person works full-time or part-time. Older people get five more days, mother with children gets three to five more days. Maximum leave is 35 days per year. Sundays and public holidays are not counted to the leave. They are free for all.
Solomon Islands	15	0	15	Each worker is entitled to be given by his employer a holiday at the rate of not less than 1.25 working days for each complete calendar month of employment in an undertaking.
Somalia	13	9	22	Workers are entitled to 15 days of paid annual leave and are also entitled to 9 paid public holidays.
South Africa	15	12	27	21 consecutive days, or 1 day for every 17 days worked, or 1 hour for every 17 hours worked, Regular workers may take a further 3 days of family responsibility leave. Leave legislation does not apply to members of the National Defence Force, National Intelligence Agency, South African Secret Service or unpaid volunteers working for a charity. Employees are also entitled to 12 paid public holidays.
South Korea	15–25	17	32–42	15 days and for workers who have worked 3 years, one day will be added for every two years continuously worked, up to a maximum of 25 days. Employees are entitled to up to 17 paid public holidays, although this can go down to 15 in a given year if some holidays happen to fall on a weekend in that year.
South Sudan	20	12	32	Employees are entitled to paid annual leave for every year of service: 20 days for one to three years of continuous service; 25 days for eight to (less than) fifteen years of continuous service; and 30 days for 15 or more years of service with the employer. Employees are also entitled to 12 paid public holidays.
Spain	22	14	36	Workers are entitled to 22 working days of annual leave and 14 paid public holidays. Public holidays on weekends are not moved to other days, like in the UK, so the effective number is 11 for a 5-day workweek.
Sri Lanka	20	20	40	In practice, most of the religious and festival holidays are available with most jobs having 20 days paid leave and 20 public holidays. However shop and office employees are entitled to a minimum of 14 days of annual leave and are also entitled to 8 paid public holidays.
Sudan	20	–	20	Workers are entitled to annual leave as follows: 20 days if a worker has been continuously employed by his employer for a period of one to three years; 25 days if a worker has spent eight years or less than 15 years of continuous service with his employer; 30 days if a worker has spent 15 or more years of continuous service with his employer.
Suriname	12	18	30	
Eswatini	10	–	10	An employee is entitled to no less than two weeks of holiday for every 12 months of employment with an employer.
Sweden	25	9	34	Employees are entitled to 25 work days of annual leave. Up to five of those days can be saved for another year, for up to five years, enabling an employee to have a 10-week paid annual leave every five years. Sweden has 11 statutory holidays which are paid for if they fall on Monday-Friday. In addition, there are three "eves" (Midsummer Eve, Christmas Eve and New Year's Eve) that are treated as de facto holidays by most employers and are paid for if they fall on Monday-Friday. State employees are entitled to 28 vacation days a year until the year they turn 29, 31 days from the year they turn 30, and 35 days from the year they turn 40.
Switzerland	20	7	27	Employees over 20 years of age are entitled to 4 weeks, under 20 are entitled to 5 weeks. Employees are also entitled to depending on the canton 7 to 15 paid public holidays.
Syria	24	13	37	Employees are entitled to one annual leave of twenty-four working days, with full pay, after 1 to 5 years of employment; twenty-one working days, after 5 to 10 years of employment; and thirty working days, after 10 or more years of employment or when they are over 50. Employees are also entitled to 13 paid public holidays.
Taiwan	3–30	12	15–42	3 days (half year to 1 year of employment), 7 days (1 year), 10 days (2 years), 14 days (3 to 4 years), 15 days (5 to 9 years), and one additional day per year until 30 days (10+ years).
Tanzania	20	17	37	An employer is required to grant an employee at least 28 consecutive days of leave in respect of each 12-month period of employment, and such leave is inclusive of any public holiday that may fall within the period of leave. Employees are also entitled to 17 paid public holidays.
Thailand	6	13	19	Annual leave shall be for a period of not less than 6 working days following the employee's first year of employment. In subsequent years, the employer may fix the annual vacation at more than 6 working days for an employee. Employees are also entitled to 13 paid public holidays.
East Timor	12	–	12	
Togo	22	0	22	Workers are entitled to two and a half days per month. There are no legal provisions for pay on public holidays.
Tonga	20	–	20	Employees are entitled to a minimum of 20 paid days off per year, with part time employees earning a pro-rated portion.
Trinidad and Tobago	10	14	24	All workers in general are entitled to 14 consecutive days holiday with pay at the expiration of each complete year. Employees are also entitled to 14 paid public holidays.
Tunisia	12–18	7–15	19–33	All workers who perform at least 1 month of work during the reference year are entitled to enjoy 1 day of leave per month with a total duration not exceeding 15 days, of which 12 will be working days. Workers are entitled to additional leave days as follows; 1 day yearly for every 5 years of work with the same employer to a maximum of 18 days. Employees are also entitled to 7 to 15 paid public holidays.
Turkey	12	14.5	26.5	14 work days (Saturdays are counted as workdays) for 1–5 years, 20 work days for 6 to 15 years, and 26 days for over 15 years seniority. There are a total of 14.5 paid public holidays, but if these holidays fall on Sundays or other off-days of a worker, they are not carried over to the next workday.
Uganda	15	13	28	An employee, once in every calendar year, is entitled to a holiday with full pay at the rate of seven days in respect of each period of a continuous four months' service. Employees are also entitled to 13 paid public holidays.
Ukraine	24	13	37	Employees are entitled to 24 calendar days of paid annual leave (31 for persons under 18 years old), 13 days of National Holidays (moved to a next working day if overlap with Saturdays or Sundays).
United Arab Emirates	30	14	44	The worker shall be entitled during every year of service an annual leave of no less than the following periods: Two days for each month should the period of service of the worker be of six months at least and a year at most; Thirty days for each year should the period of service of the worker exceed one year. Employees are also entitled to 14 paid public holidays.
United Kingdom	28	0	28	Employees are entitled to 28 total working days (expressed as 5.6 working weeks) of annual leave. These often include public/bank holidays which otherwise would be unpaid, but there is no right to take annual leave on public holidays as such. Most employers allow leave on recognised bank holidays as a habit. A contract of employment may give a right to more holidays. Part-time workers are entitled to the same amount of leave but this is calculated on a pro-rata basis.
United States	0	0	0	There is no federal or state statutory minimum paid vacation or paid public holidays. Paid leave is at the discretion of the employers to their employees. According to the US Bureau of Labor Statistics, 77% of private employers offer paid vacation to their employees; full-time employees earn on average 10 vacation days after one year of service. Similarly, 77% of private employers give their employees paid time off during public holidays, on average 8 holidays per year. Some employers offer no vacation at all. The average number of paid vacation days offered by private employers is 10 days after 1 year of service, 14 days after 5 years, 17 days after 10 years, and 20 days after 20 years. A number of states and non-states in the United States have instituted some form of paid leave with 11 states (California, Maine, Oregon, Washington, Colorado, New Jersey, New York, Connecticut, Rhode Island and Massachusetts) along with the District of Columbia having mandatory paid family leave while 4 other states have a system but it is not yet active (Delaware, Maryland, Minnesota and Maine). Voluntary leave is in 8 states (Texas, Arkansas, Tennessee, Alabama, Florida, Virginia, New Hampshire and Vermont).
Uruguay	20	5	25	All workers, in the private sector and civil servants, are entitled to at least 20 days of paid annual leave. Workers who have worked in the same company, are entitled to an additional day of leave for every four years of seniority. Employees are also entitled to 5 paid public holidays.
Uzbekistan	15	–	15	
Vanuatu	15	0	15	Every employer shall grant to an employee who has been in continuous employment with the same employer for: (a) a period of 1 to 6 years – annual leave on full pay at the rate of 1.25 working days per month for each year of employment; or (b) a period of 7 to 19 years – annual leave on full pay at the rate of 1.75 working days per month for each year of employment. There are no legal provisions for pay on public holidays.
Venezuela	15	14	29	Workers are entitled to enjoy 15 days of paid annual leave in the first year plus one day for each year of service with the same employer up to a maximum of 15 extra days.
Vietnam	12	11	23	Employees working in normal working conditions are entitled to 12 working days after every 12 months of employment. This entitlement increases by one additional day of leave for every five years of employment in an enterprise or with an employer. Employees are also entitled to 11 paid public holidays.
Yemen	22	15	37	Workers shall be entitled to leave of not less than 30 days with full pay for each year of effective service, to be calculated on the basis of at least two-and-a- half days for each month. Employees are also entitled to 15 paid public holidays.
Zambia	20	11	31	Employees are entitled to two days of paid holidays in respect of each period of one month's service. Employees are also entitled to 11 paid public holidays.
Zimbabwe	22	11	33	An employee is entitled to one twelfth of the employee's qualifying service in each year of employment, subject to a maximum accrual of ninety days of paid vacation leave. Employees are also entitled to 11 paid public holidays.

== By country ==
=== Luxembourg ===
Luxembourg has various types of extraordinary leave:

Type of extraordinary leave	Civil servants	Private-sector employees
Marriage	3 days	3 days
Civil partnership	1 days	1 day
Death of spouse/civil partner/parent/adult child	3 days	3 days
Death of child under 18	5 days	5 days
Death of grandparent or grandchild	1 day	1 day
Death of sibling living in same household	3 days	-
Marriage of child	1 days	1 day
Moving house (once per 3-year period)	2 days	2 days
Adoption of child under 16	10 days	10 days
Birth of child (for father only)	10 days	10 days

== See also ==
- Annual leave
- Long service leave
- Parental leave
- List of holidays by country
