= Public holidays in the European Union =

The European Union does not set public holidays for its member states. However the European Commission does set public holidays for the employees of the institutions of the European Union.

The holidays will typically cover the following dates of significance and movable feasts:

Public holidays for the institutions of the European Union in 2025
Date	Day
1 January 2025	New Year's Day
2 January 2025	Day following New Year's Day
17 April 2025 (Thursday before Easter)	Maundy Thursday
18 April 2025 (Friday before Easter)	Good Friday
21 April 2025 (Monday after Easter)	Easter Monday
1 May 2025	Labour Day
9 May 2025	Europe Day
29 May 2025	Ascension Thursday
30 May 2025	the Friday following Ascension Day
9 June 2025	Whit Monday
21 July 2025	Belgian National Day
15 August 2025	Assumption
1 November 2025	All Saints' Day
2 November 2025	All Souls' Day
24 to 31 December 2025 inclusive	End-of-year days, including Christmas

This list includes all ten public holidays in Belgium, except for Armistice Day (11 November). For Luxembourg, Belgian National Day is replaced by the Luxembourgish National Day.

== See also ==
- Work–life balance in the European Union

For information on public holidays in individual EU member states see below:

- Austria
- Belgium
- Bulgaria
- Croatia
- Cyprus
- Czech Republic
- Denmark
- Estonia
- Finland
- France
- Germany
- Greece
- Hungary
- Ireland
- Italy
- Latvia
- Lithuania
- Luxembourg
- Malta
- Netherlands
- Poland
- Portugal
- Romania
- Slovakia
- Slovenia
- Spain
- Sweden
