= Public holidays in Somaliland =

Public holidays in Somaliland are based on two official calendar systems: the Gregorian calendar primarily, and the Islamic lunar calendar for religious holidays.

Date	English name	Local name
Gregorian calendar
1 January	New Year's Day	
1 May	Labour Day	
18 May	Somaliland Declaration of Independence	Ku dhawaaqida Gooni isu taaga Somaliland
26 June	Independence Day State of Somaliland	
Islamic lunar calendar
12 Rabi' al-Awwal	Birthday of Muhammad	Mawlid Nabi
27 Rajab	Muhammad's Ascension to Heaven	Isra and Mi'raj
1 Shawwal	End of Ramadan	Eid al-Fitr
10 Dhu'l-Hijja	Feast of Sacrifice	Eid al-Adha
1 Muharram	Islamic New Year	Islamic New Year
10 Muharram	Ashura	Ashura

== See also ==
- Public holidays in Djibouti
- Public holidays in Somalia
