= List of celebrations =

For lists of celebrations, please see:

- Lists of festivals
- List of holidays by country
