= Public holidays in the Faroe Islands =

This is a list of public holidays in the Faroe Islands.

Date	Name in English	Name in Faroese	Remarks
1 January	New Year's Day	Nýggjársdagur	
movable holiday	Palm Sunday	Palmasunnudagar	
movable holiday	Maundy Thursday	Skírhósdagur	
movable holiday	Good Friday	Langifríggjadagur	
movable holiday	Easter Sunday	Páskasunnudagur	
movable holiday	Easter Monday	Páskamánadagur	
4th Friday April or May	General Prayer Day	Storur bonardagur	
25 April	National Flag Day	Flaggdagur	After noon
movable holiday	Ascension Day	Kristi himmalsferðardagur	
movable holiday	Whit Sunday	Hvítursunnudagur	
movable holiday	Whit Monday	Hvíturmánadagur	
5 June	Constitution Day	Grundlógardagur Danmarkar	After noon
28 July	Saint Olav's Eve	Ólavsøkuaftan	After noon
29 July	Saint Olav's Day	Ólavsøkudagur	
24 December	Christmas Eve	Jólaaftan	
25 December	Christmas Day	Jól	
26 December	Second Day of Christmas	Annar jóladagur	
31 December	New Year's Eve	Nýggjársaftan	
