= Public holidays in Greenland =

This is a list of public holidays in Greenland.

== Public holidays ==
Date	English name	Danish name	Holiday type	Comments
January 1	New Year's Day	Nytårsdag	National Holiday	
Variable	Maundy Thursday	Skærtorsdag	National Holiday, Christian	The Thursday before Easter Sunday.
Variable	Good Friday	Langfredag	National Holiday, Christian	The Friday before Easter Sunday.
Variable	Easter Sunday	Påskedag	National Holiday, Christian	The Monday after Easter Sunday.
Variable	Easter Monday	Anden påskedag	National Holiday, Christian	The Monday after Easter Sunday.
4th Friday April or May	General Prayer Day	Store Bededag	National Holiday, Christian	4th Friday after Easter.
May 1	International Workers' Day	Arbejdernes internationale kampdag	National Holiday	Anniversary Home Rule
Variable	Ascension Day	Kristi himmelfartsdag	National Holiday, Christian	Forty days after Easter Sunday.
Variable	Whit Sunday	Pinsedag	National Holiday, Christian	The Monday after Whit Sunday
Variable	Whit Monday	Anden pinsedag	National Holiday, Christian	The Monday after Whit Sunday
June 21	National Day	Grønlands nationaldag	National Holiday	
December 24	Christmas Eve	Juleaftensdag	National Holiday	
December 25	Christmas Day	Juledag	National Holiday	
December 26	Second Day of Christmas	Anden juledag	National Holiday	
December 31	New Year's Eve	Nytårsaften	National Holiday	
