= Public holidays in the Solomon Islands =

The people of the Solomon Islands observe these holidays nationally.

== Public holidays ==
- 1 January: New Year's Day
- Variable Friday: Good Friday
- Variable Saturday: Holy Saturday
- Variable Monday: Easter Monday
- Variable Monday: Whit Monday
- Second Friday in June: King's Birthday
- 7 July: Independence Day
- 25 December: Christmas Day
- 26 December: National Day of Thanksgiving

== Province Day ==
In addition to the national holidays each province has its own Province Day. If a Province Day falls on a Sunday, the public holiday is on the following Monday:

- 25 February: Choiseul Province
- 2 June: Isabel Province
- 8 June: Temotu Province
- 29 June: Central Province
- 20 July: Rennell and Bellona Province
- 1 August: Guadalcanal Province
- 3 August: Makira-Ulawa Province
- 15 August: Malaita Province
- 7 December: Western Province

== See also ==
- List of holidays by country
