= Public holidays in Sint Maarten =

This is a list of public holidays in Sint Maarten.

Date	Name in English	Name in Dutch	Remarks
1 January	New Year's Day	Nieuwjaarsdag	
movable holiday	Good Friday	Goede vrijdag	
movable holiday	Easter Sunday	Pasen	
movable holiday	Easter Monday		
27 April	King's Day	Koningsdag	
30 April	Carnival Day	Karnaval	
1 May	Labour Day	Dag van de Arbeid	
movable holiday	Ascension Day	Hemelvaartsdag	
movable holiday	Whit Sunday	Pinksteren	
1 July	Emancipation Day		Day of anniversary of abolishment of slavery, often takes 2 days-off
10 October	Constitution Day		Day of Constitution of Sint Maarten entered into force.
11 November	Sint Maarten Day		The feast day of Saint Martin of Tours.
25 December	Christmas Day	Kerstmis	
26 December	Second day of Christmas	Tweede kerstdag	
