= Public holidays in Sint Eustatius =

This is a list of public holidays in Sint Eustatius.

Date	Name in English	Name in Dutch	Remarks
January 1	New Year's Day	Nieuwjaarsdag	
movable holiday	Good Friday		
movable holiday	Easter	Pasen	
movable holiday	Easter Monday		
April 27	King's Birthday	Koningsdag	
May 1	Labour Day	Dag van de Arbeid	
movable holiday	Ascension Day	Hemelvaartsdag	
movable holiday	Whit Sunday	Pinksteren	
July 1	Emancipation Day		Day of anniversary of abolishment of slavery.
November 16	Sint Eustatius Flag Day		
December 25	Christmas Day	Kerstmis	
December 26	Second day of Christmas		
