= Public holidays in Palestine =

Public holidays in Palestine.

== Holidays ==
Date	English name	Arabic name
1 January	New Year's Day	رأس السنة الميلادية; Ras Assanah al-Miladi
7 January	Christmas Day (Orthodox)	عيد الميلاد; Eid al-Milad
1 May	Labour Day	عيد العمال; Eid al-Ommal
15 November	Independence Day	يوم الاستقلال; Eid al-Istiklaal
25 December	Christmas Day (Catholic)	عيد الميلاد; Eid al-Milad
1 Muharram	Islamic New Year	أس السنة الهجرية; Ras Assanah al-Hijri
12 Rabi' al-Awwal	The Prophet's Birthday	المولد النبوي; Mawlid al-Nabi
27 Rajab	The Prophet's Ascension	الإسراء والمعراج; Isra' and Mi'raj
1 Shawwal	Eid al-Fitr	عيد الفطر; Eid al-Fitr
10 Dhul Hijja	Eid al-Adha	عيد الأضحى; Eid al-Adha

== Ottoman Palestine ==
During the period of Ottoman rule, Palestine was administered as part of the Ottoman Empire from 1517 until the early 20th century. Ottoman authorities governed the region through a system of administrative districts while allowing considerable autonomy to religious communities through the millet system.

Under this system, each recognized non-Muslim religious community formed a millet, which functioned as a self-governing community responsible for many of its internal affairs. These communities maintained their own court systems, languages, and religious practices, particularly in matters such as family law and education.

Ottoman authorities also established agreements with religious institutions to ensure access to places of worship and to maintain order during major religious events. The administration provided security and medical assistance for pilgrims visiting religious sites, and food supplies were often stockpiled ahead of major holidays such as Easter, when large numbers of visitors arrived in cities such as Jerusalem. At the same time, officials sometimes increased surveillance during these gatherings due to concerns that large crowds could lead to political or nationalist unrest.

== Mandatory Palestine ==
In Mandatory Palestine, the weekly holiday was observed on Sunday by the Palestine Government, reflecting the Christian influence of the British administration. However, the diverse religious demographics of the region meant that different communities observed their sabbath on different days. For Muslims, the sabbath was Friday, while Jews observed Saturday as their holy day, and Christians continued to observe Sunday. This arrangement allowed for some flexibility in commercial and social activities, as businesses and individuals could choose their day of rest based on their religious practices.

Several significant Islamic holidays were observed in Mandatory Palestine, reflecting the region's majority Muslim population. The Nabi Musa festival, which commemorates the Prophet Moses, was one of the most prominent and involved large gatherings and processions. Additionally, Muslims celebrated the major Islamic holidays of Eid al-Fitr, marking the end of Ramadan, and Eid al-Adha, commemorating the willingness of Ibrahim (Abraham) to sacrifice his son as an act of obedience to God. The Mawlid, celebrating the birth of the Prophet Muhammad, was another key religious observance.

Other Islamic observances included Islamic New Year's Day (Hijri New Year), marking the beginning of the Islamic lunar calendar, and Isra Wal Miraj, which commemorates the night journey and ascension of the Prophet Muhammad. These events were marked by religious ceremonies, special prayers, and communal gatherings throughout the Muslim communities in Palestine.

These religious observances were integral to the cultural and social life of the Muslim population in Mandatory Palestine and contributed to the diverse and multi-religious environment of the region during the British mandate.

== State of Palestine ==
- Movable – Islamic New Year
- Movable – The Prophet's Birthday
- Movable – The Prophet's Ascension
- Movable – Eid al-Fitr
- Movable – Eid al-Adha

== See also ==
- Islamic holidays
