= Public holidays in Montserrat =

This is a list of public holidays in Montserrat.

Date	Holiday	Remarks
1 January	New Year's Day	
17 March	Saint Patrick's Day	
movable holiday	Good Friday	
movable holiday	Easter Monday	
First Monday in May	Labour Day	
movable holiday	Whit Monday	
Second Monday in June	King's Birthday	
Second Wednesday in July	National Day of Prayer and Thanksgiving	added to the schedule of public holidays in 2023
First Monday in August	Emancipation Day	
25 December	Christmas Day	
26 December	Boxing Day	
31 December	Festival Day	
