= Public holidays in Saba =

This is a list of public holidays in Saba.

Date	Name in English	Name in Dutch	Remarks
January 1	New Year's Day	Nieuwjaarsdag	
movable holiday	Good Friday	Goede Vrijdag	
movable holiday	Easter	Pasen	
movable holiday	Easter Monday		
April 27	King's Birthday	Koningsdag	
May 1	Labor Day	Dag van de Arbeid	
movable holiday	Ascension Day	Hemelvaartsdag	
movable holiday	Whit Sunday	Pinksteren	
Last Monday in July	Carnival Monday	Carnaval	
December 6	Saba Flag Day	Vlagdag saba	
December 25	Christmas Day	Kerstmis	
December 26	Second Day of Christmas	Tweede Kerstdag	
