= Public holidays in New Caledonia =

This is a list of holidays in New Caledonia.

== List ==
Date	English name
1 January	New Year's Day
Monday after Easter Sunday (2020 date: 13 April)	Easter Monday
1 May	Labour Day
8 May	Victory Day
Thirty-nine days after Easter Sunday (2020 date: 21 May)	Ascension Day
Fifty days after Easter Sunday (2020 date: 1 June)	Whit Monday
14 July	French National Day
15 August	Assumption Day
24 September	New Caledonia Day
1 November	All Saints' Day
11 November	Armistice Day
25 December	Christmas Day
31 December	New Year's Eve
