= Public holidays in Guernsey =

Guernsey public holiday list

This is a list of public holidays in Guernsey.

The legislation for holidays in Guernsey can be viewed on guernseylegalresources.gg.

New Year's Day will be moved to the next Monday, if it would fall on a weekend. Liberation Day will not be moved, if on a weekend except in special cases like 2010.

If Christmas Day or Boxing Day fall on a Sunday, they will be moved to the next Monday, if they fall on a Sunday, they will be moved to the next Tuesday.

Date	Holiday
1 January	New Year's Day
movable holiday	Good Friday
movable holiday	Easter Monday
1st Monday in May	May Day bank holiday
9 May	Liberation Day
Last Monday in May	Spring bank holiday
Last Monday in August	Summer bank holiday
25 December	Christmas Day
26 December	Boxing Day

Also, Alderney observes the first Monday of August as Summer Bank Holiday, and 15 December as Homecoming Day, commemorating the day in 1945 when evacuated residents returned to the island after the Second World War. Sark observes 10 May as its Liberation Day.
