= Public holidays in Nigeria =

Nigeria has many public holidays declared by the government, as well as special days observed by the public.

== Public holidays ==
Holiday	Date	Notes	Ref.
New Year's Day	1 January	Commemorates the beginning of the calendar year.	
Workers' Day	1 May	Commemorates Workers' Labour Movement internationally.	
Democracy Day	12 June	Commemorates the return to democracy in Nigeria.	
Independence Day	1 October	Commemorates the Independence of Nigeria from Britain.	
Christmas Day	25 December	Christian holiday commemorating the birth of Jesus.	
Boxing Day	26 December	Christian holiday commemorating the day after Christmas.	

== Movable holidays ==
In addition, Nigeria officially celebrates a few moveable holidays, which occur on different dates every year. These include religious dates observed by different cultural groups.

Holiday	Date	Notes	Ref.
Mawlid	12 Rabi' al-awwal	Muslim holiday celebrating the birthday of Muhammad.	
Eid al-Adha	10 Dhu al-Hijjah	Muslim holiday celebrating the willingness of Ibrahim to sacrifice his son.	
Eid al-Fitr	1 Shawwal	Muslim holiday celebrating the end of Ramadan, a month of fasting.	
Good Friday	Friday before Easter (March or April)	Christian holiday commemorating the crucifixion of Jesus.	
Easter Monday	Monday after Easter (March or April)	Christian holiday commemorating the resurrection of Jesus.	
