= Public holidays in Guyana =

This is a list of public holidays in Guyana.

Date	Name
1 January	New Year's Day
23 February	Republic Day
February or March	Phagwah
March or April	Good Friday
March or April	Easter Monday
1 May	Labour Day
5 May	Indian Arrival Day
26 May	Independence Day
First Monday in July	CARICOM Day
1 August	Emancipation Day
October or November	Diwali
25 December	Christmas Day
26 December	Boxing Day
12th day of the month in the Islamic calendar	Youman-Nabi
10th day of the month in the Islamic calendar	Eid-ul-Adha
