= Public holidays in Liberia =

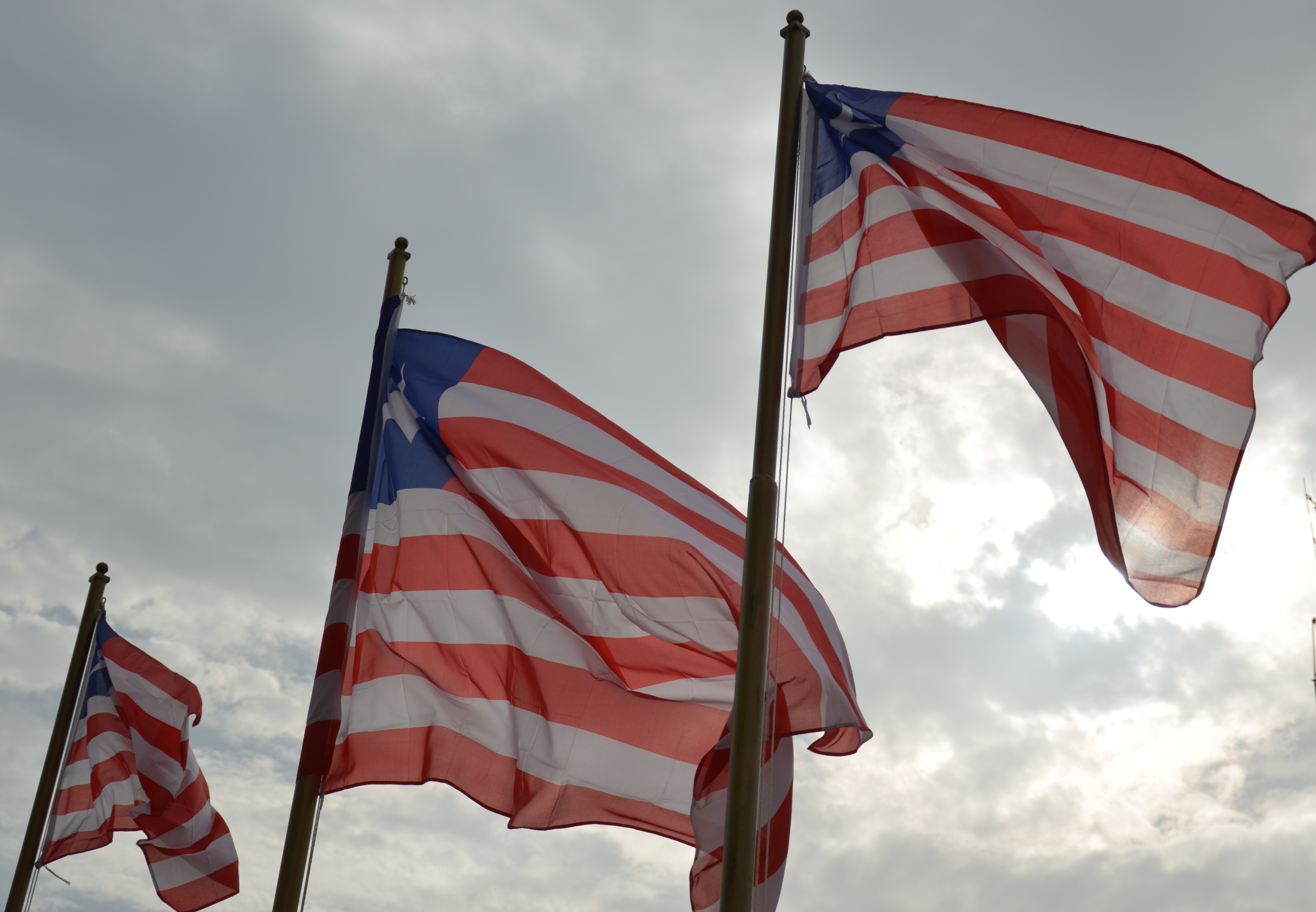
Flags of Liberia. National Flag Day is celebrated in August

The following are public holidays in Liberia.

== Public holidays ==
Date	Name	Remarks
January 1	New Year's Day	
February 11	Armed Forces Day	Honors the Armed Forces of Liberia
Second Wednesday in March	National Decoration Day	Day to decorate the graves of ancestors.
March 15	Joseph Jenkins Roberts Birthday	Birthday of the first president of Liberia.
Second Friday in April	Fast and Prayer Day	Established by an act of the national legislature in 1883.
May 14	National Unification Day	Also called “Integration Day,” the purpose is to improve relations between descendants of American slaves and members of the aboriginal population. Established 1960.
July 26	Independence Day	From the American Colonization Society, 1847
August 24	National Flag Day	The holiday was first observed in an 1847 convention, when the founding fathers approved the flag's design along with establishing the new republic. It was established as a national holiday in 1915.
First Thursday in November	Thanksgiving Day	Established in 1883, this is a day for prayer to thank God for being born in a free country.
November 29	William V. S. Tubman's Birthday	Birthday of the longest serving President in Liberia
December 25	Christmas Day	

== Former public holidays ==
Date	Name	Remarks
December 1	Matilda Newport Day	Named a holiday by the Legislature of Liberia in 1916. The holiday was abolished in 1980 following the coup by Samuel Doe, due to its divisive nature.
