= Public holidays in Cuba =

This is a list of public holidays in Cuba.

Date	English name	Local name	Notes
January 1	Liberation Day	Día de la Liberación	The day of the victory of the revolution led by Fidel Castro in 1959 – after Fulgencio Batista fled the night before – which established the present government in Cuba.
January 2	Victory Day	Día de la Victoria	
date varies	Good Friday	Viernes Santo	Made a public holiday in 2012 at the request of Pope Benedict XVI, during his visit to Cuba in that year; confirmed as an annual holiday in 2013
May 1	International Workers' Day	Día de los Trabajadores	Labour Day
July 25	Day before the Commemoration of the Assault on the Moncada Garrison	Conmemoración del asalto a Moncada	Day before the anniversary of the assault on the Moncada Barracks.
July 26	Commemoration of the Assault on the Moncada Garrison (official name means "National Rebellion Day")	Día de la Rebeldía Nacional	The date after which the revolutionary movement (26 July Movement) was named. In the morning of July 26, 1953, some 160 men under the command of Fidel Castro attacked the Moncada army garrison in Santiago de Cuba, Cuba's second-largest city. Although this action failed, it is seen as the beginning of the Castro-led insurrection that expelled Fulgencio Batista. There are normally two or three days of public holidays together.
July 27	Day after the Commemoration of the Assault on the Moncada Garrison	Conmemoración del asalto a Moncada	Day after the anniversary of the assault on the Moncada Barracks.
October 10	Independence Day	Día de la Independencia	This day in 1868, Carlos Manuel de Céspedes, "Father of the Homeland", gave freedom to his slaves and started the independence war against the Spanish colonial power, which led to the Cry of Yara.
December 25	Christmas Day	Navidad	From 1969 to 1998, Christmas was a normal working day in Cuba. Official observance of Christmas was reinstated in 1998 after Pope John Paul II's visit to Cuba.
December 31	New Year's Eve	Fiesta de Fin de Año	New Year's Eve in Cuba is a public holiday where it is a day off for the general population, and schools and most businesses are closed.
