= Public holidays in Chad =

This is a list of public holidays in Chad.

| Date | English name | Comments |
|---|---|---|
| 1 January | New Year's Day | |
| 8 March | International Women's Day | |
| March or April | Easter Monday | Day after Easter |
| 1 May | Labour Day | |
| 11 August | Independence Day | Celebrates the liberation of France, 1960. |
| 1 November | All Saints' Day | |
| 28 November | Republic Day | Autonomy within the French Community, 1959. |
| 1 December | Freedom and Democracy Day | Idriss Déby became the President of Chad on this day in 1990. |
| 25 December | Christmas Day | |
| 12 Rabiʽ al-Awwal | The Prophet's Birthday | Prophet Muhammad's Birthday. |
| 1 Shawwal | Korité | End of Ramadan; Muslim Festival of Breaking the Fast. |
| 10 Dhu al-Hijjah | Tabaski | Muslim Feast of the Sacrifice. |

December 1, "Freedom and Democracy Day", remembers December 1, 1990 and celebrates the ascent of President Idriss Déby to power.

March 8 is celebrated as "International Women's Day"—La Journee Internationale de la Femme—and marks the culmination of a national week of activities (la Semaine Nationale de la Femme Tchadienne, or "SENAFET") celebrating women. Observations of "huit mars", as it is known locally in French, vary from town to town, ranging from small ceremonies or a day off school for girls only to a week of events that includes races, contests and expositions by women’s groups and ends with parades and community-wide celebrations.
