= Public holidays in Oman =

The following is a list of public holidays in Oman.

Date	Holiday
Religious
1 Muharram	Islamic New Year
12 Rabi'-ul-Awwal	Prophet's Birthday
27 Rajab	Prophet's Ascension
1-3 Shawwal	End of Ramadan
10-13 Dhu al-Hijjah	Feast of the Sacrifice
Other
11 January	Accession Day
20-21 November	National Day

National Day - November 20th: Celebrates the date of the founding of the Al Bu Said dynasty, which has ruled Oman since 1744.

Accession Day - January 11th: Marks the death of Sultan Qaboos bin Said and the accession of Sultan Haitham bin Tariq to the Omani throne.

Renaissance Day - July 23rd: Marks the beginning of the Sultanate's modernization under the leadership of Sultan Qaboos bin Said al-Said in 1970.

Eid Al-Fitr: Islamic holiday marking the end of Ramadan (the holy month of fasting). The date varies each year according to the Islamic lunar calendar.

Eid Al-Adha: Islamic holiday commemorating the willingness of Ibrahim (Abraham) to sacrifice his son as an act of obedience to God. The date varies each year according to the Islamic lunar calendar.

Islamic New Year (Hijri New Year): Marks the beginning of the Islamic lunar calendar year. The date varies each year.

Prophet Muhammad's Birthday (Mawlid Al-Nabi): Celebrates the birth of the Islamic prophet Muhammad. The date varies each year according to the Islamic lunar calendar.

Omani Women's Day - October 17th: Honors the achievements and contributions of Omani women to the country's development.

Islamic holidays are based on the lunar calendar and therefore shift by approximately 10 to 12 days earlier each year in the Gregorian calendar. Other regional or cultural holidays may vary from time to time and by location within Oman.
