= Public holidays in Trinidad and Tobago =

The government of Trinidad and Tobago officially recognises a number of holidays and celebrations from most represented groups. The following holidays are those that are officially observed in Trinidad and Tobago:

== Public holidays ==
Date	English name	Remarks
1 January	New Year's Day	The celebration of the first day of the Gregorian Calendar.
Variable	Good Friday	Christian day marking the death of Jesus Christ.
Variable	Easter Monday	When holidays fall on a Sunday, the Monday is given as a public holiday. Therefore, "Easter Monday", the Monday following Easter Sunday, is a public holiday.
30 March	Spiritual Baptist Shouter Liberation Day	First country in the world to recognise the Spiritual Baptist faith with a national holiday
Variable	Corpus Christi	Christian feast in honour of the Holy Eucharist
30 May	Indian Arrival Day	Recognising the arrival of the first Indian indentured labourers. The first country in the world to commemorate Indian indentureship with a public holiday.
19 June	Labour Day	Marks the labour uprising on 19 June 1937 which is generally recognised as the start of the modern trade union movement in Trinidad and Tobago.
1 August	African Emancipation Day	Recognising Afro-Trinidadian and Tobagonian's emancipation from slavery. The first country in the world to commemorate the end of slavery with a public holiday.
31 August	Independence Day	The day Trinidad and Tobago declared independence from the British
24 September	Republic Day	Celebrating the day Trinidad and Tobago became a Republic.
Variable	Eid al-Fitr	End of Ramadan. Locally taken as an official recognition of Islam. It is one of the most important holidays on the Islamic calendar and is the most widely and publicly celebrated Muslim holiday in the country followed closely by Eid al-Adha (which is not an official holiday in the country).
Variable	Diwali	The Hindu festival of lights celebrated on the Kartik Amawas. It celebrates Ram, Sita, and Lakshman's return to their kingdom in Ayodhya after 14 years of exile and defeating the demon-king Ravana. This festival also celebrates Lakshmi, the goddess of light, wealth, and prosperity. The first country in the Western Hemisphere to make it a public holiday in 1966.
25 December	Christmas Day	The Christian celebration of the birth of Jesus Christ.
26 December	Boxing Day	A Commonwealth gift-giving traditional holiday.

== Carnival dates ==
The table shows a list of Trinidad and Tobago Carnival dates from 2009 to 2020.

Calendar year	Carnival Monday	Carnival Tuesday
2009	February 23	February 24
2010	February 15	February 16
2011	March 7	March 8
2012	February 20	February 21
2013	February 11	February 12
2014	March 3	March 4
2015	February 16	February 17
2016	February 8	February 9
2017	February 27	February 28
2018	February 12	February 13
2019	March 4	March 5
2020	February 24	February 25
2021 - No carnival due to COVID-19 pandemic
2022 - No carnival due to COVID-19 pandemic
2023	February 20	February 21

== Other holidays ==
- Hindu schools may close for some holidays such as Phagwah (Holi), Maha Shivratri, Ram Naumi, Hanuman Jayanti, Krishan Janamashtami, Kartik Nahan, Ganesh Chauth, Vijayadashami, Saraswati Jayanti, Raksha Bandhan, and Makar Sankranti. Some Hindu-owned businesses may close on these days too.
- Muslim schools get a day off on Eid-al-Adha every year and some Muslim-owned businesses close on this day.
- The boroughs of Trinidad also celebrate their respective borough days with festivals but it is not a public holiday.
- Chinese New Year is celebrated by the Chinese community but is not a public holiday.

=== One-off holidays ===
- In 2006, the government declared 12 October 2006 (Chinese Arrival Day Bicentennial) a public holiday but only for that year.
- In 2017, the government declared 13 October 2017 (First Peoples' Day) a public holiday but only for that year.
