= Public holidays in Bahrain =

The following table indicates declared Bahrain government national holidays for the year 2015 only—cultural variants also provide opportunity for holidays tied to local events. In total there are 10 public holidays.

== 2017 public holidays ==
Date	English name	Local (Arabic) name	Description
1 January	New Year's Day	رأس السنة الميلادية	The Gregorian New Year's Day, celebrated by most parts of the world.
22 February	Sports Day	اليوم الرياضي	Half-day only, promotes healthy living, wellness, and community engagement.
1 May	Labour Day	يوم العمال	Locally called "Eid Al Oumal" (Workers' Day), it is an annual holiday that celebrates the achievements of workers.
16-17 December	National Day	اليوم الوطني	National Day of Bahrain.
1 Muharram	Islamic New Year	رأس السنة الهجرية	Islamic New Year (also known as: Hijri New Year).
9–10 Muharram	Day of Ashura	عاشوراء	Represent the 9th and 10th day of the Hijri month of Muharram. Coincide with the memory of the martyrdom of Imam Hussein.
12 Rabi' al-Awwal	Prophet Muhammad's day of birth	المولد النبوي	Commemorates Prophet Muhammad's day of birth, celebrated in most parts of the Muslim world.
1–3 Shawwal	Little Feast	عيد الفطر	Commemorates end of Ramadan.
9 Dhu al-Hijjah	Arafat Day	يوم عرفة	Commemoration of Muhammad's final sermon and completion of the message of Islam.
10–12 Dhu al-Hijjah	Feast of the Sacrifice	عيد الأضحى	Commemorates Ibrahim's willingness to sacrifice his son. Also known as the Big Feast (celebrated from the 10th to 13th).

== See also ==
- Islamic calendar - for further expansion on the months and days identified above

== Notes ==
- Second time in 2015 due to lunar cycles
