= Public holidays in South Sudan =

This is a list of public holidays in South Sudan.

== Holidays ==
- 1 January: New Year's Day
- Variable: Good Friday
- Variable: Holy Saturday
- Variable: Easter Sunday
- Variable: Easter Monday
- 1 May: Labour Day
- 16 May: SPLA Day
- 9 July: Independence Day
- 30 July: Martyrs' Day, which commemorates the death of John Garang de Mabior, leader of the Sudan People's Liberation Army during the Second Sudanese Civil War, in a helicopter crash in 2005. Foul play in his death has never been proven.
- 24 December: Christmas Eve
- 25 December: Christmas Day
- 26 December: Second Day of Christmas
- 1 Shawwal: Eid al-Fitr
- 10 Dhu al-Hijjah: Eid al-Adha
