= Public holidays in Peru =

The following is a list of public holidays in Peru.

Date	English name	Spanish Name
January 1	New Year's Day	Año Nuevo
(movable)	Maundy Thursday	Jueves Santo
(movable)	Good Friday	Viernes Santo
May 1	Labour Day	Día del Trabajo
June 7	Flag Day	Día de la Bandera
June 29	Saints Peter and Paul	San Pedro y San Pablo
July 23	Air Force Day	Día de la Fuerza Aérea
July 28-29	Independence Day	Día de la Independencia
August 6	Battle of Junin	Batalla de Junin
August 30	Santa Rosa de Lima	Día de Santa Rosa de Lima
October 8	Battle of Angamos	Combate de Angamos
November 1	All Saints’ Day	Día de Todos los Santos
December 8	Immaculate Conception	Inmaculada Concepción
December 9	Battle of Ayacucho	Batalla de Ayacucho
December 25	Christmas Day	Navidad
