= Public holidays in Mauritania =

Below is a list of holidays in Mauritania.

== Public holidays ==
Date	English name	Description
January 1	New Year's Day	
May 1	Labour Day	
May 25	Africa Day	
November 28	Independence Day	From France, 1960
1 Muharram	Islamic New Year	
12 Rabi' al-awwal	Mouloud	Muhammad's Birthday
1 Shawwal	Korité	Festival of Breaking the Fast
10 Dhu al-Hijjah	Tabaski	Feast of the Sacrifice
