= Public holidays in Burkina Faso =

This is a list of holidays in Burkina Faso.

== Public holidays ==
Date	English name	Description
January 1	New Year's Day	
March 8	International Women’s Day	
May 1	Labour Day	
May 15	Day of Customs and Traditions	
May or June	Ascension Day	Ascension of Jesus into Heaven.
August 15	Assumption Day	Assumption of the Virgin Mary into Heaven.
December 11	National Day	The Republic of Upper Volta became a self-governing autonomous republic within the French Community in 1958.
December 25	Christmas Day	
Shawwal 1	Korité	Breaking of the Ramadan fast.
Dhu al-Hijjah 10	Tabaski	Feast of the Sacrifice of Abraham.
Rabi' al-awwal 12	Mawlid	Birthday of Muhammad.
