= Public holidays in Jersey =

This is a list of regular public holidays in Jersey.

Jersey has the same public holidays as the United Kingdom - plus an extra day on 9 May, to mark Liberation Day (ignoring special holidays like the Corn Riots Anniversary in 2021). If a bank holiday is on a weekend, a substitute weekday becomes a bank holiday, normally the following Monday.

Date	Holiday
1 January	New Year's Day
Variable	Good Friday
Variable	Easter Monday
First Monday in May	Early May Bank Holiday
9 May	Liberation Day
Last Monday in May	Spring Bank Holiday
Last Monday in August	Summer Bank Holiday
25 December	Christmas Day
26 December	Boxing Day
