= Public holidays in Uganda =

There are approximately fourteen nationally recognized public holidays in Uganda.

== Main Holidays ==
Date	Name	Description
1 January	New Year's Day	
26 January	NRM Liberation Day	Fireworks, military parades and sporting events to celebrate the 1986 overthrow of the then sitting government.
16 February	Archbishop Janani Luwum Day	
8 March	Women's Day	
1 May	Labour Day	
3 June	Uganda Martyrs' Day	Honors 45 Christians who were martyred between 1885 and 1887.
9 June	National Heroes' Day	Begun in 2001, this holiday honours people who fought on both sides of the Ugandan Bush War. The date recalls the assassination of Eddidian Babumba Mukiibi Luttamaguzi.
9 October	Independence Day	From the United Kingdom, 1962
25 December	Christmas Day	
26 December	Boxing Day	
Friday of Holy Week; March or April	Good Friday	Crucifixion of Jesus
Monday after Easter; March or April	Easter Monday	Christian Feast of the Resurrection
1 Shawwal	Eid al-Fitr	Muslim End of Ramadan
10 Dhu al-Hijjah	Eid al-Adha	Muslim Feast of Sacrifice
