= Public holidays in Paraguay =

The following are national holidays in Paraguay

Date	English name	Local name	Remarks
January 1	New Year's Day	Año Nuevo	
March 1	National Heroes' Day	Día de los Héroes Nacional	
March/April	Maundy Thursday	Jueves Santo	Movable, Lunar Calendar. April 13, 2017.
March/April	Good Friday	Viernes Santo	Movable, Lunar Calendar. April 14, 2017.
May 1	Labour Day	Día de los Trabajadores	
May 14	Independence Day	Dia de la Independencia Nacional	
June 12	Chaco Armistice Day	Dia de la Paz del Chaco	
June 20	Constitution Day	Jura de la Constitución Nacional	
August 15	Founding of Asunción	Fundación de Asunción	
September 29	Battle of Boqueron	Batalla de Boquerón	
December 8	Virgin of Caacupé	Virgen de Caacupé	
December 25	Christmas Day	Día de Navidad	
