= Public holidays in Ecuador =

The national public holidays in Ecuador include:

Date	English name	Local name	Remarks
January 1 (Fixed)	New Year's Day	Año Nuevo	
February - March (Floating)	Carnival	Carnaval	Date (Monday & Tuesday) varies per liturgical calendar
March–April (Floating)	Good Friday	Viernes Santo	Date varies per liturgical calendar
May 1 (Floating)	Labour Day	Día del Trabajo	
May 24 (Floating)	Battle of Pichincha (1822)	Batalla de Pichincha	
August 10 (Fixed)	Declaration of Independence of Ecuador (1809)	Primer Grito de Independencia	
October 9 (Floating)	Independence of Guayaquil (1820)	Independencia de Guayaquil	
November 2 (Fixed)	All Souls' Day	Día de los Difuntos, Día de Muertos	
November 3 (Fixed)	Independence of Cuenca (1820)	Independencia de Cuenca	
December 6 (Fixed)	Foundation of Quito (1534)	Fundación de Quito	
December 25 (Fixed)	Christmas Day	Día de Navidad	

The anniversary of the annexation of the Galapagos Islands and Charles Darwin's birthday are also celebrated on February 12 as Galapagos Day (dia de la Provincia or dia de la Provincia de Galápagos). This is sometimes described on the mainland as Amazon and Galapagos Day or Orient Day (dia del Oriente), as the discovery of the headwaters of the Amazon River by Francisco de Orellana in 1542 is also recorded occurring on the same day.
