= Public holidays in Cape Verde =

This is a list of holidays in Cape Verde.

== Public holidays ==
Date	Holiday	Local name	Description
January 1	New Year's Day	Ano Novo	
January 13	Democracy Day	Dia da Democracia	Celebrates first democratic elections, 1991
January 20	Heroes' Day	Dia da Heróis Nacional	Anniversary of the death of Amilcar Cabral.
May 1	Labour Day	Dia do Trabalhador	
June 1	Youth Day	Dia Mundial da Criança	
July 5	Independence Day	Dia da Independência Nacional	From Portugal, 1975
August 15	Assumption Day	Dia da Assunção	
November 1	All Saints' Day	Dia de Todos os Santos	
December 25	Christmas Day	Natal	
