= Public holidays in Gabon =

This is a list of holidays in Gabon.

- January 1 New Year's Day
- Variable Easter Monday
- April 17 Women's Day
- May 1 Labour Day
- Variable Ascension Day
- Variable Whit Monday
- August 15 Assumption Day
- August 16–17 Independence Day
- August 30 Liberation Day
- Variable Eid al-Fitr
- Variable Eid al-Adha
- November 1 All Saints' Day
- December 25 Christmas Day
