= Public holidays in Madagascar =

The public holidays in Madagascar are:

Date	English name	Comments
January 1	New Year's Day	
March 8	Women's Day	International Women's Day
March 29	Martyrs' Day	Memorializes those who died in the Revolt of 1947 against the French.
variable (March or April)	Easter Monday	
May 1	Labour Day	International Workers' Day
variable (May or June)	Ascension Day	
variable (May or June)	Whit Monday	
June 26	Independence Day	Madagascar gained full independence from France on June 26, 1960.
August 15	Assumption Day	
November 1	All Saints Day	
December 25	Christmas Day	
1 Shawwal	Eid al-Fitr	Islamic Festival of Breaking the Fast
10 Dhu al-Hijjah	Eid al-Adha	Islamic Feast of the Sacrifice
