= Public holidays in Bolivia =

There are current eleven public holidays in Bolivia. Both secular and some Christian holidays are recognized.

== List of holidays ==
Remarks
January 1	New Year's Day	Año Nuevo	
January 22	Plurinational State Foundation Day	Dia de la Fundación del Estado Plurinacional	
February or March	Carnival Monday	Lunes de Carnaval	
February or March	Carnival Tuesday	Martes de Carnaval	
March or April	Good Friday	Viernes Santo	
May or June	Corpus Christi	Corpus Christi	This holiday, religious as well as national, is a celebration of the Eucharist and one of the nation's busiest festivities. It occurs 60 days after Easter.
May 1	Labour Day	Dia del trabajo	Paid holiday, occurs on Monday if it falls on a Sunday
June 21	Aymara New Year	Año Nuevo Andino	
August 6	Independence Day	Dia de la Patria	
November 2	All Souls' Day	Fieles Difuntos	
December 25	Christmas Day	Navidad	
