= Public holidays in Samoa =

Public holidays in Samoa are defined in the Public Holidays Act 2008:

Holidays
Date	English name
January 1-2	New Year's Day
Variable	Good Friday
Variable	Holy Saturday
Variable	Easter Monday
Second Monday in May	Mother's Day
June 1	Independence Day
Second Monday in August	Father's Day
Second Monday in October	Lotu a Tamaiti
December 25	Christmas Day
December 26	Boxing Day

In addition to holidays with fixed dates, polling day and the day before polling day is a public holiday in any year when an election is held. In addition, the O le Ao o le Malo can declare public holidays in accordance with the Act.
