= Public holidays in Guinea =

There are 12 national holidays celebrated in the Republic of Guinea, a country in West Africa. Employees must be given the day off with pay or another day off in lieu of pay.

== Public holidays ==
Date	English name	Description
January 1	New Year's Day	
Monday after Easter	Easter Monday	Resurrection of Jesus
May 1	Labour Day	International Workers' Day
May 25	Africa Day	
August 15	Assumption Day	
October 2	Independence Day	From France, 1958
December 25	Christmas Day	Birth of Jesus
12 Rabi' al-awwal	Maouloud	Muhammad's Birthday
27 Ramadan	Qadr Night	Revelation of the Quran
1 Shawwal	Korité	Festival of Breaking the Fast
10 Dhu al-Hijjah	Tabaski	Feast of the Sacrifice
