= Public holidays in El Salvador =

This is a list of public holidays in El Salvador.

== Public holidays ==
Date	English name	Local name	Remarks
January 1	New Year's Day	Año Nuevo	The celebration of the first day of the Gregorian Calendar.
March or April	Holy Week	Semana Santa	Holy Wednesday is a Bank holiday. Maundy Thursday, Good Friday, Holy Saturday and Easter Sunday are official holidays.
May 1	Labour Day	Día del Trabajo	Also called International Workers' Day
May 10	Mother's Day	Día de la Madre	
June 17	Father's Day	Día del Padre	
September 15	Independence Day	Día de la Independencia	Celebrates the Act of Independence of Central America in 1821.
November 2	All Souls' Day	Día de los Fieles Difuntos	
December 24	Christmas Eve	Noche Buena	From noon onward
December 25	Christmas Day	Navidad	
December 31	New Year's Eve	Víspera de Año Nuevo	From noon onward
