= Public holidays in the United Arab Emirates =

The United Arab Emirates Government announced official holidays for the public and private sectors for the years 2019. The Cabinet granted equal leaves (14 days) sectors. This decision aims to achieve a balance between the two sectors in the number of official holidays they are entitled to. The 1st of December is a public holiday, known as Commemoration Day.

== List holidays ==
| Date | English | Arabic | |
|---|---|---|---|
| January 1 | New Year's Day | Ra's as-Sana al-Meladiah | رأس السنة الميلادية |
| December 2-3 | National Day | Eid al-Etihad | عيد الاتحاد |
| Ramadan 29 - 3 Shawwal | Eid al-Fitr | Eid al-Fitr | عيد الفطر |
| Dhu al-Hijjah 9 | Day of Arafat | Waqfat Arafah | وقفة عرفة |
| Dhu al-Hijjah 10-12 | Eid al-Adha | Eid al-Adha | عيد الأضحى |
| Muharram 1 | Islamic New Year | Ra's as-Sana al-Hijria | رأس السنة الهجرية |
| Rabi' al-Awwal 12 | The Prophet's Birthday | Almuld Alnubawiu Alsharif | المولد النبوي الشريف |

- For Eid al-Fitr, Day of Arafah, Eid al-Adha, Islamic New Year and The Prophet's Birthday are determined by Moon Sighting.

== See also ==
- Islamic calendar - for further expansion on the months and days identified above
