= Public holidays in Lesotho =

This is a list of holidays in Lesotho.

- January 1: New Year's Day
- March 11: Moshoeshoe's Day
- March 29: Good Friday
- April 1: Easter Monday
- May 1: Workers' Day
- May 9: Ascension Day
- May 25: Africa Day
- July 17: King's Birthday
- October 4: Independence Day
- December 25: Christmas Day
- December 26: Boxing Day
