= Store bededag =

Danish Christian holiday

- Also called: Great Prayer Day
- Observed by: Faroe Islands, Greenland; formerly: Norway, Iceland, mainland Denmark
- Date: 4th Friday after Easter
- 2025 date: 16 May
- 2026 date: 1 May
- 2027 date: 23 April
- 2028 date: 12 May
- Frequency: annual

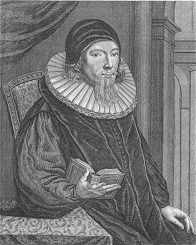
Bishop of Zealand (1675-1693) Hans Bagger who played an important role in creating the holiday.

Store bededag, translated literally as Great Prayer Day or more loosely as General Prayer Day, "All Prayers" Day, Great Day of Prayers or Common Prayer Day, is a holiday on the 4th Friday after Easter. It is currently observed in the Faroe Islands, where it is called dýri biðidagur, and in Greenland (Greenlandic: tussiarfissuaq). The earliest possible day is 17 April (if Easter falls on 22 March), the latest possible day is 21 May (if Easter falls on 25 April).

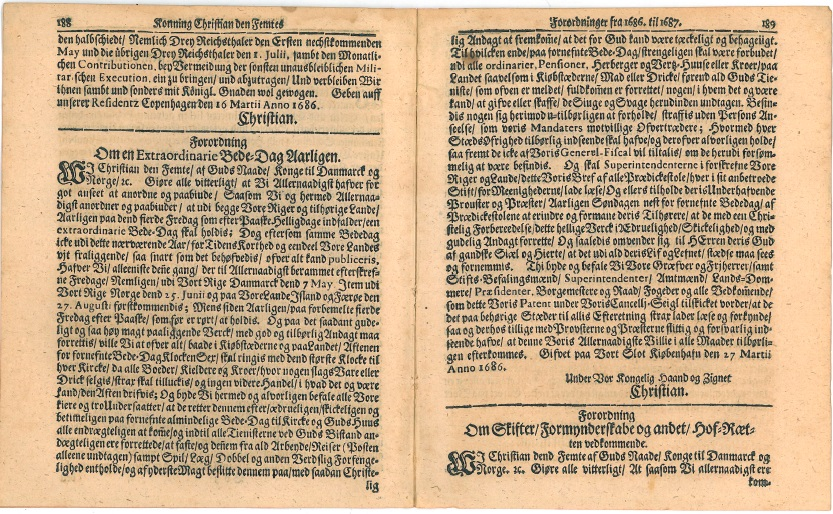
The royal regulation from 1686 (Bededagsforordningen)

Store bededag was one of three original fast- and prayer days that were introduced by Hans Bagger, the bishop of Zealand in 1686. Store bededag was a statutory holiday in Denmark. It was one of the few holidays that survived in the great holiday reform carried out in 1771 during the reign of Christian VII, when his prime minister, Count Johann Friedrich von Struensee, was in power. However, it was not Struensee who came up with the idea of this particular reform, as the church commission which had worked on it had been instituted several years before Struensee arrived at the Danish court.

There are very few traditions associated with store bededag. Traditionally, bells in every church announce the eve of store bededag. This and Kristi himmelfartsdag (Ascension Thursday) are the only two days, other than Saturdays and Sundays, on which confirmations take place, for confirmation is part of regular church services.

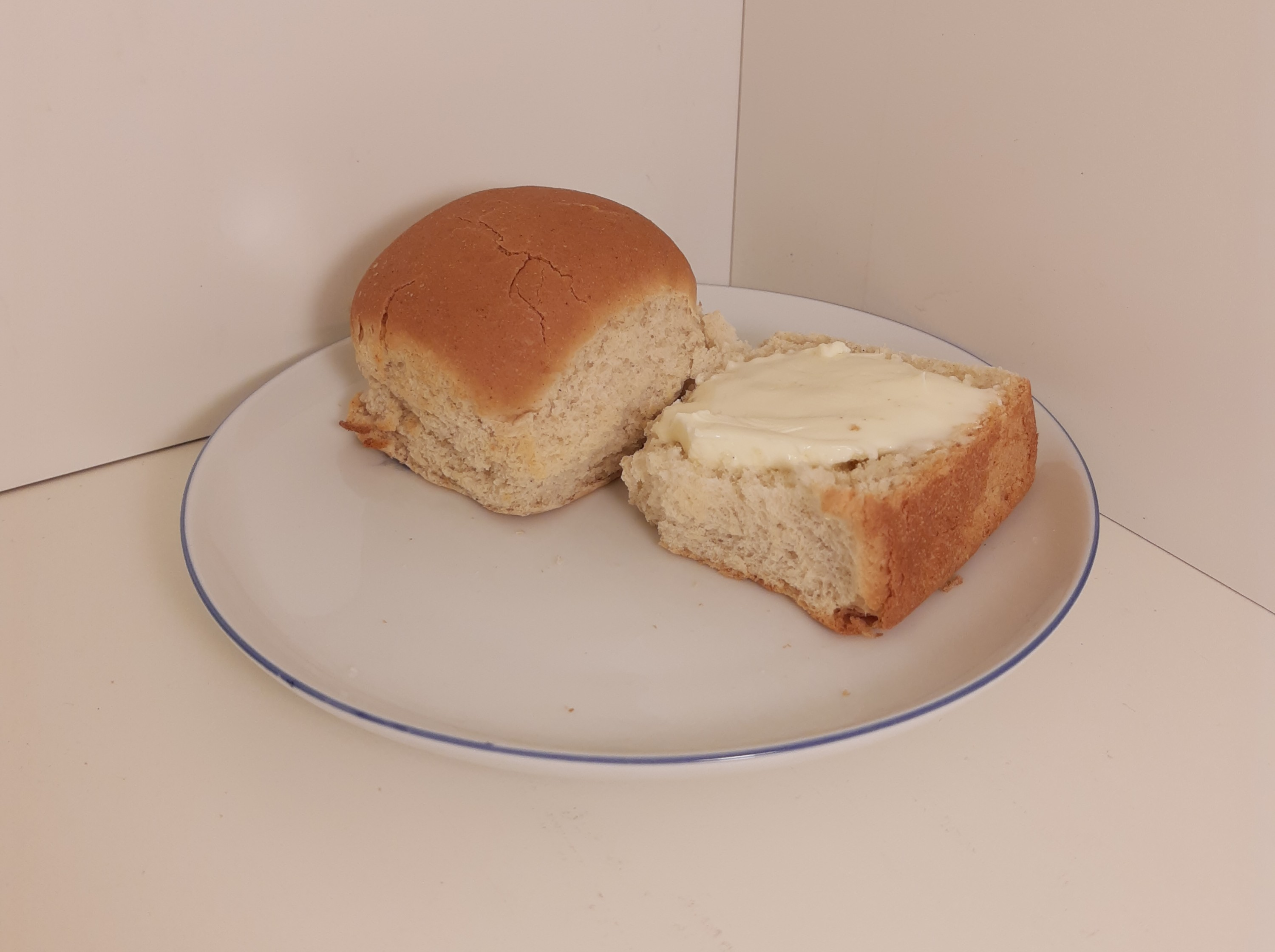
Danish varme hveder served with butter.

In the evening before the holiday, it was customary to buy and eat varme hveder, a traditional bread, because bakers were closed on holidays and people bought bread for the following day. It is more common, also outside Copenhagen, to still buy and eat varme hveder.

Formerly, citizens and students of Copenhagen strolled the city ramparts on the evening before the holiday; the students of Copenhagen University did this to honour the many students who had died defending Copenhagen during the assault on Copenhagen. Today, the city ramparts are gone and instead the tradition is to walk along Langelinie on Copenhagen's waterfront or on the fortification of Kastellet, though only few follow this tradition depending on the spring weather.

== Abolishment in Denmark, 2023 ==
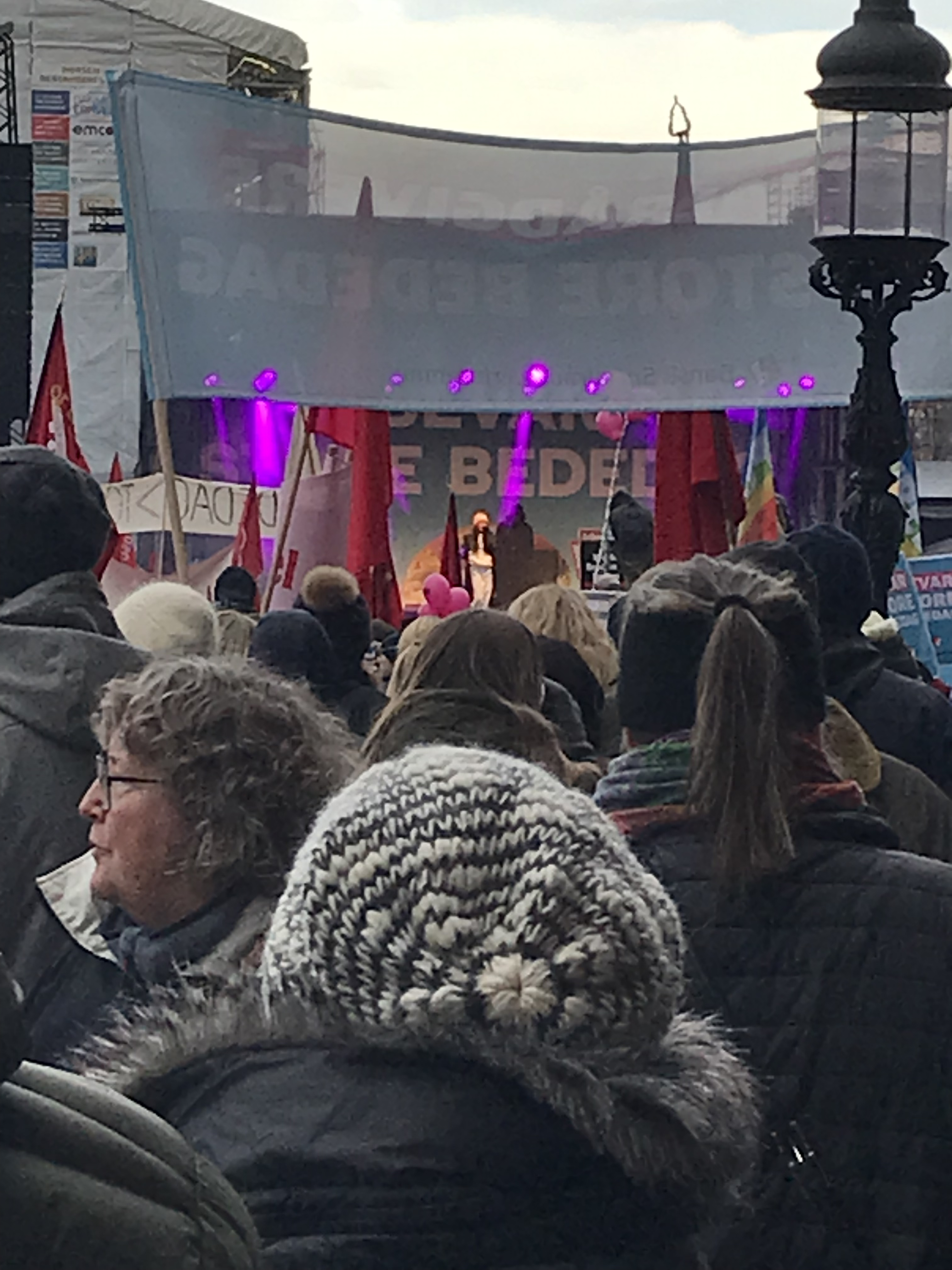
People protesting against the proposal to abolish the holiday

On 14 December 2022, Prime Minister Mette Frederiksen proposed abolishing the holiday in 2024 as a means of increasing Denmark's defence spending. The government estimated that cancelling the holiday would provide an extra three billion Danish kroner to be used toward's Denmark's defence budget. The proposal did not include removing the holiday from the Faroes and Greenland. This proposal was received negatively by the opposition parties, trade unions, the national church, and the general public, with a petition to keep the holiday receiving more than 477,000 signatures as of 28 February. In early February 2023, ahead of the government's vote on the matter, around 50,000 protesters gathered outside the Danish Parliament to protest the proposal.

On 28 February 2023, the Danish Parliament voted 95-68 to abolish Store Bededag, effective from 2024. Store Bededag was celebrated in Denmark as a public holiday for the last time on the 5 May 2023.
