= Public holidays in Chile =

This is a list of public holidays (national or otherwise) in Chile; about half of them are Christian holidays.

== Dates for the year 2026 ==
Month	Day	English name	Local name	Remarks
January	1 (Thursday)	New Year's Day	Año Nuevo	Mandatory holiday. Blue laws forbid opening of most services.
April	3 (Friday)	Good Friday	Viernes Santo	
April	4 (Saturday)	Holy Saturday	Sábado Santo	
May	1 (Friday)	Labour Day	Día del Trabajo	Mandatory holiday. On this day, more stores and services will close than on any other holidays, as stipulated by blue laws.
May	21 (Thursday)	Navy Day	Día de las Glorias Navales	Commemorates the Battle of Iquique.
June	7 (Sunday)	Battle of Arica	Asalto y Toma del Morro de Arica	This is a regional holiday, valid only in the Arica and Parinacota Region.
June	21 (Sunday)	National Indigenous Peoples Day	Día Nacional de los Pueblos Indígenas	This holiday is to be observed on each winter solstice.
June	29 (Monday)	Saint Peter and Saint Paul	San Pedro y San Pablo	The base date is June 29, but if it falls on a day other than Saturday, Sunday or Monday, the holiday is moved to the nearest Monday.
July	16 (Thursday)	Our Lady of Mount Carmel	Virgen del Carmen	Established in 2007, it replaced Corpus Christi. The Catholic Church's official name for this day is Solemnidad de la Virgen del Carmen, Reina y Patrona de Chile, but the law that created this holiday (20,148) does not use it.
August	15 (Saturday)	Assumption of Mary	Asunción de la Virgen	
August	20 (Thursday)	Nativity of Liberator Bernardo O'Higgins	Nacimiento del Prócer de la Independencia	This is a local holiday, valid only in the communes of Chillán and Chillán Viejo.
September	18 (Friday)	Independence Day	Fiestas Patrias	Mandatory holiday. Celebrates the establishment of the First Government Council in 1810.
September	19 (Saturday)	Army Day	Día de las Glorias del Ejército	Mandatory holiday.
October	12 (Monday)	Columbus Day	Encuentro de Dos Mundos	Colloquially known as Día de la Raza ("Race Day") or formally by its older name (Aniversario del Descubrimiento de América). Officially on October 12, if this holiday falls on a day other than Saturday, Sunday or Monday, the holiday is usually held on the nearest Monday.
October	31 (Saturday)	Reformation Day	Día Nacional de las Iglesias Evangélicas y Protestantes	Established in 2008. This holiday moves in relation to the day of week.
November	1 (Sunday)	All Saints' Day	Día de Todos los Santos	
December	8 (Tuesday)	Immaculate Conception	Inmaculada Concepción	
December	25 (Friday)	Christmas Day	Navidad / Natividad del Señor	Mandatory holiday.

== History ==
On January 28, 1915, President Ramón Barros Luco promulgated Law 2,977, which organized all available information regarding holidays celebrated in Chile. It established or retained the following holidays:

1. Sundays year-round.
2. January 1 (Feast of the Circumcision of Christ at the time; New Year in the late 20th and 21st centuries), June 29 (Feast of Saints Peter and Paul), August 15 (Assumption of Mary), December 8 (Immaculate Conception), December 25 (Christmas Day), and the movable holidays of the Ascension of Jesus Christ and Corpus Christi.
3. Fridays and Saturdays during Holy Week.
4. September 18, Establishment of the First Government Junta in 1810.
5. September 19 and May 21, in celebration of the achievements of the Army and the Navy.
6. The day of election of electors of the President of the Republic.

The same law abolished, by omission, four religious holidays: Epiphany (Adoración de los Santos Reyes, January 6), Carnival (Carnaval, movable), Annunciation (Anunciación del Señor, March 25), and Nativity of the Virgin Mary (Natividad de la Virgen, September 8). It also shortened the national independence holiday to two days (until 1914, they occupied September 18, 19, and 20).

On November 14, 1921, President Arturo Alessandri Palma promulgated Law 3,810, designating October 12 (Columbus Day) as a holiday. On April 30, 1931, President Carlos Ibáñez del Campo promulgated the Decree Enforceable as Law (Decreto con Fuerza de Ley) 130, marking May 1 (May Day) as a holiday.

In 1932, Provisional President Bartolomé Blanche reinstated the September 20 holiday, which remained in effect until 1944. In 1968, the holidays of Saint Peter and Saint Paul, Ascension of Jesus Christ, and Corpus Christi were eliminated by Article 144 of Law 16,840. The Catholic Church agreed to celebrate them on the nearest Sunday. September 11 (the day of the military coup in 1973) was established as a holiday (Día de la Liberación Nacional, "Day of National Liberation") by the military regime in 1981. In 1998, it was replaced by the Día de la Unidad Nacional ("Day of National Unity"), observed on the first Monday in September. In March 2002, the latter was abolished. The holiday on June 29 (Feast of Saints Peter and Paul) was reinstated in September 1985. In 1987, during a visit by Pope John Paul II, Corpus Christi was reinstated (although the Church continued to observe the holiday on the nearest Sunday).

On March 10, 2000, Law 19,668 moved the Feast of Saints Peter and Paul, Columbus Day, and Corpus Christi holidays to the preceding Monday if they fell on a Tuesday, Wednesday, or Thursday, or to the following Monday if they fell on a Friday. Additionally, the designation of Columbus Day was changed from Aniversario del Descubrimiento de América to Día del Descubrimiento de Dos Mundos ("Discovery of Two Worlds' Day"), which was an obvious adaptation of the then-recent ubiquitous Encuentro de dos mundos ("The Meeting of Two Worlds") slogan.

On January 6, 2007, Law 20,148 replaced Corpus Christi with Our Lady of Mount Carmel, to be observed on July 16, starting that year. On September 14, 2007, Law 20,215. declared holidays for all September 17s falling on a Monday and all September 20s falling on a Friday. On October 11, 2008, Law 20,299 established Reformation Day on October 31 as a national holiday, starting that year. This holiday is moved to the preceding Friday if it falls on a Tuesday or to the following Friday if it falls on a Wednesday. On April 30, 2013, Law 20,663 established the regional Battle of Arica holiday, to be observed only in the Arica and Parinacota region. On December 30, 2016, Law 20,983 declared as holidays those days that are Monday, January 2, or Friday, September 17. On June 19, 2021, Law 21,357 declared the Winter Solstice as a holiday, honoring Chile's aboriginal peoples (pueblos originarios).

In addition to yearly holidays, presidential elections have been declared holidays since 1901, as mandated by successive versions of the General Elections law (Law 18,700, being the current one; see laws 1,464, 1,752, 2,977, decree-law 542, 6,250, 6,834, 9,334, and 12,891). Since the late 20th century, parliamentary and municipal elections are also public holidays (see Law 18,700). Censuses, held every ten years, have been declared holidays since 1982; that year's census and 1992's were so due to ad-hoc laws; censuses taken from 1992 onwards are declared holidays due to a reform in the Census law (this did not occur either in 2012 or in 2024, where the censuses were carried out over several months, using a different methodology).

=== Meaning of the January 1 holiday ===
Shortly after Chile's independence, an 1824 (government-approved) Church decree reduced the number of religious holidays, enumerating the surviving holidays, including the Feast of the Circumcision of Christ, observed on January 1. Law 2,977 (passed in 1915, still in effect) lists this holiday by date only, without using any name, but it does treat it as a religious one. However, as of 2009, it is widely celebrated as the (civic) New Year holiday. In fact, there are no known regulations later than 1915 that use the name "Circumcision of Christ," while "New Year" is used in numerous regulations of all types (laws (19.925), decree-laws (decretos ley) (1.299, 1.613 and 2,408), decrees enforceable as law (decretos con fuerza de ley) (D.F.L. 338 of 1960), ministerial decrees and resolutions (decree 6234 of 1929 of the Public Education Ministry (the oldest such regulation), decree 83 of 1985 of the Labor Ministry, decree 48 of 2007 of the Labor Ministry, and so on) and municipal decrees and ordinances (decree 1316 of 2004 of the Las Condes Municipality, decree 23 of 2006 of the Padre Las Casas Municipality, decree 23 of 2009 of the San Carlos Municipality, and so forth).
