= Public holidays in Yemen =

This is a list of public holidays in Yemen. There are five holidays in Yemen following the Gregorian calendar and four following the Islamic calendar.

== List ==
Date	English name	Local name	Remarks
May 1	Labour Day	عيد العمال	
May 22	Unity Day	اليوم الوطني للجمهورية اليمنية	Anniversary of the unification of North Yemen and South Yemen
September 26	Revolution Day	ثورة 26 سبتمبر المجيدة	الثورة على النظام الإمامي و إعلان الجمهورية The Revolution against the Kingdom of Yemen and Declaration of the Yemen Arab Republic.
October 14	Liberation Day	ثورة 14 أكتوبر المجيدة	الثورة على الاستعمار البريطاني في الجزء الجنوبي من الوطن The Revolution against British colonialism in the southern part of the country.
November 30	Independence Day	عيد الجلاء	خروج اخر جندي بريطاني British Withdrawal from Aden
Dates following the lunar Islamic calendar
Shawwal 1-3	Eid al-Fitr	عيد الفطر ‘Īd al-Fiṭr	ثلاثة ايام اجازة
Dhu'l-Hijja 10-13	Eid al-Adha	عيد الأضحى ‘Īd al-’Aḍḥà	اربعة ايام اجازة
Muharram 1	Hijri New Year	عيد راس السنة الهجرية ‘Īd Ra’s as-Sanät al-Hījrīyä	First Day of New Islamic or Arabic Hjri Calendar Lunar Year
Rabi' al-Awwal 12	Mawlid	المولد النبوي al-Maulid an-Nabawī	Islamic prophet Muhammad's birthday
