= Public holidays in Finland =

All official holidays in Finland are established by acts of Parliament. The official holidays can be divided into Christian and non-Christian holidays. The main Christian holidays are Christmas, New Year's Day, Epiphany, Easter, Ascension day, Pentecost, Midsummer Day, and All Saints' Day. The non-Christian holidays are May Day and the Independence Day of Finland.

In addition to this all Sundays are official holidays but they are not as important as the special holidays. The names of the Sundays follow the liturgical calendar and they can be categorized as Christian holidays. When, in the late 1960s, the standard working week in Finland was reduced to 40 hours by an act of Parliament, it also meant that all Saturdays became a sort of de facto public holidays, though not official ones. Easter Sunday and Pentecost are Sundays that form part of a main holiday and they are preceded by a kind of special Saturdays.

Several Christian holidays traditionally falling on working days or on fixed dates have been moved to Saturdays and Sundays. In 1955, Midsummer day was moved to the Saturday following 19 June, the feast of the Annunciation to the Sunday following 21 March (or, if this coincides with Easter or with Palm Sunday, the Sunday before Palm Sunday), and All Saints' Day to the Saturday following 30 October. More holidays were moved in 1973: Epiphany to the Saturday following 5 January and Ascension Day to the Saturday before the traditional Thursday, but these revisions were reversed in 1991.

In Åland, Åland's Autonomy Day is celebrated on 9 June each year to commemorate the establishment of the region’s autonomy. It is a paid holiday only for public sector employees.

== Tradition ==
Christmas Eve and Midsummer Eve might very well be the single most important holidays during the entire year for Finns. Surprisingly they are not officially called holidays and are not so marked in calendars, but for most people, are not working days, and in practice they differ from official holidays only in that most shops are open on those days from early morning till noon. They hold this de facto status partly due to some statements in legislation but also because most employment contracts provides for these days as full holidays. A number of the less important main holidays are also preceded by de facto half days, meaning that in some (but not all) offices working hours are then shorter than normally. These are Maundy Thursday, the day before May Day and New Year's Eve.

Already before the 5 days working week was generally adopted in Finland in the late 1960s, working hours in most cases were shorter on Saturdays (4...5 h) than on other weekdays (8 h), but they were equally shorter also on all eves of public holidays, for example on the eve of Epiphany, the eve of All Saints' Day, and even including Christmas Eve and Midsummer Eve. But when Saturdays ceased to be working days, new contracts removed these shortenings from other holiday eves, except from Midsummer and Christmas Eve which also became de facto holidays.

The Finnish calendar also provides for special flag flying days. A day's status as a flag flying day has no formal link with an eventual status as an official or as a de facto holiday. However, May Day, Midsummer Day and Independence Day have the status of both a flag flying day and a public holiday. Midsummer Day is also Flag Day.

Finland has an official National Day, 6 December. Some minor observances are also denoted in the Finnish calendar, though they have not been judged worthy of either holiday or flag flying day status.

== List of holidays ==
Date	English name	Local name – Finnish	Local name – Swedish	Remarks
1 January	New Year's Day	Uudenvuodenpäivä	Nyårsdagen	
6 January	Epiphany	Loppiainen	Trettondedagen	
Moveable Friday	Good Friday	Pitkäperjantai	Långfredagen	The Friday before Easter Sunday
Moveable Sunday	Easter Sunday	Pääsiäispäivä	Påskdagen	
Moveable Monday	Easter Monday	2. pääsiäispäivä	Annandag påsk	The day after Easter Sunday
1 May	May Day	Vappu	Första maj	See Walpurgis Night
Moveable Thursday	Ascension Day	Helatorstai	Kristi himmelfärdsdag	39 days after Easter Sunday
Moveable Sunday	Pentecost Sunday	Helluntaipäivä	Pingst	49 days after Easter Sunday
Friday between 19 and 25 June	Midsummer Eve	Juhannusaatto	Midsommarafton	Non-official – Non-business day in the Annual Holidays Act (162/2005) – holiday in some collective labor agreements
Saturday between 20 and 26 June	Midsummer Day	Juhannuspäivä	Midsommardagen	Moved from 24 June
Saturday between 31 October and 6 November	All Saints' Day	Pyhäinpäivä	Alla helgons dag	Moved from 1 November
6 December	Independence Day	Itsenäisyyspäivä	Självständighetsdagen	
24 December	Christmas Eve	Jouluaatto	Julafton	Non-official – Non-business day in the Annual Holidays Act (162/2005) – holiday in some collective labor agreements
25 December	Christmas Day	Joulupäivä	Juldagen	
26 December	Second Day of Christmas	2. joulupäivä or tapaninpäivä	Annandag jul	

== See also ==
- Flag flying days in Finland
- Namesdays in Finland
- Tourism in Finland
