= Public holidays in Cyprus =

- New Year's Day – 1 January
- Epiphany – 6 January
- Clean Monday – date variable
- Greek Independence Day – 25 March
- Cyprus National Day – 1 April
- Good Friday – date variable
- Holy Saturday – date variable
- Easter Sunday – date variable
- Easter Monday – date variable
- Labour Day – 1 May
- Pentecost Monday – date variable
- Dormition of the Theotokos – 15 August
- Cyprus Independence Day – 1 October
- Greek National Day – 28 October
- Christmas Day – 25 December
- Boxing Day – 26 December

== Public transport ==
On public holidays, buses don’t operate as usual.
