= Public holidays in Djibouti =

This is a list of public holidays in Djibouti. The country uses two official calendar systems: the Gregorian calendar primarily, and the Islamic lunar calendar for religious holidays.

Date	English name	Comments
Gregorian calendar
1 January	New Year's Day
1 May	Labour Day	International Workers' Day
27 June	Independence Day	From France, 1977
Islamic calendar
Date	English name	Islamic or Arabic Name
27 Rajab	The Prophet's Ascension	Ascension of Muhammad
12 Rabi' al-awwal	The Prophet's Birthday	Birthday of Muhammad
1-2 Shawwal	Eid al-Fitr	End of Ramadan
9 Dhu al-Hijjah	Arafat Day	Arafat of Muhammad
10-11 Dhu al-Hijjah	Eid al-Adha	Feast of Sacrifice
1 Muharram	Islamic New Year	Islamic New Year

== See also ==
- Public holidays in Somalia
