= Public holidays in Somalia =

Public holidays in Somalia are based on two official calendar systems: the Gregorian calendar primarily, and the Islamic lunar calendar for religious holidays.

== Official ==
Date	English name	Local name
Gregorian calendar
1 January	New Year's Day
1 May	Labour Day
26 June	Independence Day	Marks the independence of British Somaliland on June 26, 1960. Five days later it joined Italian Somaliland as the Somali Republic.
1 July	Republic Day	Marks the unification of the former Italian and British Somalilands as the Somali Republic on July 1, 1960.
Islamic lunar calendar
12 Rabi' al-Awwal	Mawlid Nabi	Birthday of Muhammad
27 Rajab	Isra and Mi'raj	Muhammad's Ascension to Heaven
1 Shawwal	Eid al-Fitr	End of Ramadan
10 Dhu'l-Hijja	Eid al-Adha	Feast of Sacrifice
1 Muharram	Islamic New Year	Islamic New Year
10 Muharram	Ashura	Ashura

== Unofficial ==
Unofficial dates that may be commemorated by subsets of nationals from Somalia include:

- 15th of May, the date when the Somali Youth League was founded.
- Establishment dates of Somali Federal Member states, such as the 1st of August for Puntland.

== See also ==
- Public holidays in Djibouti
