= Public holidays in Denmark =

Public holidays in Denmark are the holidays recognised in law in Denmark. The Danish closure law, or Lukkeloven, requires larger retail stores to be closed on all public holidays, as well as Constitution Day (5 June), Christmas Eve (24 December) and New Year's Eve (31 December) after 15:00, but those three additional days are not considered public holidays, as non-retail employees do not get a day off.

Date	English name	Danish name	Notes
1 January	New Year's Day	Nytårsdag	
Thursday before Easter Sunday	Maundy Thursday	Skærtorsdag	
Friday before Easter Sunday	Good Friday	Langfredag	Flags are at half mast.
March/April	Easter Sunday	Påskedag	
The day after Easter Sunday	Easter Monday	Anden påskedag	
40 days after Easter	Ascension Day	Kristi himmelfartsdag	
7th Sunday after Easter	Whit Sunday	Pinsedag	
The day after Pentecost	Whit Monday	Anden pinsedag	
25 December	Christmas Day	Juledag	Danes celebrate three days of Christmas, starting early on December 24 in the evening.
26 December	Second Day of Christmas	Anden juledag	

== Other special days ==
Some of these days derive from politics, and some from Roman Catholic traditions that predate the current national church. Some are simply the Scandinavian tradition of starting the celebrations of a special day on the evening before the actual day.

Date	English name	Danish name	Notes
5 February	Birthday of Queen Mary	Dronningens fødselsdag	
6 February	Birthday of Princess Marie	Prinsesse Maries fødselsdag	Outside of the royal house there is no particular tradition for celebrating on this day.
Seven weeks before Easter Sunday	Fastelavn	Fastelavn	Fastelavn is a traditional Danish celebration with roots in the Catholic Carnival preceding Lent. It is observed on the Sunday before Ash Wednesday, approximately seven weeks before Easter. A popular baked good associated with the day is the fastelavnsbolle (lit. Fastelavn bun), a round sweet pastry usually filled with cream and often covered with icing or chocolate. Slå katten af tønden is a traditional Fastelavn game in which children take turns hitting a suspended wooden barrel filled with candy until it breaks. Historically, the barrel contained a live black cat as a symbol of driving away evil, but in modern celebrations it contains only candy. In modern celebrations, the child who breaks the bottom of the barrel, causing the candy to fall out, is traditionally crowned kattedronning (cat queen), while the child who breaks the last remaining part of the barrel is crowned kattekonge (cat king).
1 April	April Fools' Day	1. April	The day is marked by the commission of hoaxes and other practical jokes of varying sophistication on friends, enemies and neighbors, or sending them on fools' errands, the aim of which is to embarrass the gullible.
9 April	German invasion of Denmark	Danmarks besættelse	Historic date. This was the day when Germany invaded Denmark in World War II. Flags on flagpoles must be at half mast until 12:00, to indicate the mourning, after that it goes to full mast to indicate that Denmark is a free country today.
16 April	Birthday of Queen Margrethe II	Dronning Margrethes fødselsdag	
1 May	International Workers' Day	Arbejdernes kampdag	Many people attend political meetings in the morning arranged by the labour unions or the labour parties, afterwards demonstrations are held all over the country, going from the place of the meeting and joining each other along the way to a joint meeting place, often a park. The demonstrations can differ in size from a few hundred to ten-thousands depending on the city and organization. The day is also known as Arbejdernes kamp og festdag (Workers day of struggle and celebration) referring to the celebration of the past victories of the workers movement, especially the eight-hour working day. Many, both families and young people, meet at the sites of the political meetings holding picnics and drink beer and other alcoholic beverages. Copenhagen's Fælledparken is well known for its annual May 1 celebrations, gathering an average of a hundred thousand people at the meeting of the central Labour Union "LO". This is a full holiday for blue collar workers, but not for white collar workers.
5 May	Liberation Day	Danmarks befrielse	Historic date. This was the day that the German forces surrendered in Denmark under World War II. However, the island of Bornholm was not liberated on this date - instead, the occupation continued until the Red Army liberated the island. Afterwards the USSR held control of the island for a time, before it was rejoined with the rest of Denmark. The day is marked by public memorial ceremonies for fallen members of the Danish resistance, and by demonstrations of the left-wing, both in memory of the communist resistance fighters and also carrying slogans of peace and solidarity linking the struggle in the past with new ones today.
Second Sunday of May	Mother's Day	Mors dag	
26 May	Birthday of King Frederik X	Kongens fødselsdag	The King is usually celebrated in some places, and he will appear either on his balcony at Amalienborg Palace or outside of Marselisborg Palace depending on where he spends his birthday.
5 June	Constitution Day	Grundlovsdag	The signing of the Danish constitution in 1849. Some people attend meetings with speeches, often outdoors, where politicians or other public figures will elaborate their view on the constitution, history and the current state of the nation. This day probably is the closest equivalence to an actual National Day. Elderly, middle-class and right-of-centre people often regard this day as more important than May 1. With few exceptions, all shops stay closed on Grundlovsdag by law.
5 June	Father's Day	Fars dag	Coincides with Constitution Day.
7 June	Birthday of Prince Joachim	Prins Joachims fødselsdag	
15 June	Day of Valdemar and Reunion day	Valdemarsdag og Genforeningsdag	Celebration of Valdemar II of Denmark's victory in a battle in Estonia in 1219, at which Denmark's national flag Dannebrog fell from the skies. It is also the date on which Danes celebrate that Sønderjylland in 1920 was reunited with the rest of Denmark after a referendum, thus held in high regard in that part of the country. Next to Grundlovsdag, an equivalence to an actual national day, but is less widely known and celebrated today than before.
23 June	Saint John's Eve	Sankt Hans aften	Pre-Christianity celebration day, celebrating summer solstice on June 24. Sankt Hans (Johannes) is the Danish name of St. John the Baptist. The day is celebrated with a bonfire on the evening before (see Denmark section under Midsummer).
15 October	Birthday of Crown Prince Christian	Kronprins Christians fødselsdag	Outside of the royal house there is no particular tradition for celebrating on this day.
31 October	Halloween	Halloween or Allehelgensaften	According to superstition, the 31 October is the night when witches, ghosts and dark forces are set loose to disgrace the saints celebrated on the following Allehelgensdag.
10 November	The eve before Saint Martin's Day	Mortensaften	11 November is a Catholic day. Sankt Morten is the Danish name of Saint Martin of Tours. According to legend, Martin was forced to become a bishop by his parishioners and tried to hide in a barn. However, the noise of the geese gave him away. For this reason, but probably in reality because of the goose slaughtering season, it is tradition to eat a goose dinner, although over time duck has become a more practical dish on this occasion.
13 December	Saint Lucy's Day	Luciadag	Catholic day that was located on winter solstice before the European calendar reform. Revived in Sweden in 1928, and in Denmark from the 1940s.
24 December	Christmas Eve	Juleaften	The celebration of Christmas in Denmark starts in the evening, traditionally with a Christmas tree, exchanging presents and having dinner with the family. With few exceptions, all shops stay closed by law on Juleaftensdag, the day of Juleaften.
31 December	New Year's Eve	Nytårsaften	Mostly celebrated with friends or family, a homemade gourmet dinner and often liberal amounts of alcohol. The King traditionally holds a televised speech at 6pm. Midnight is celebrated with Champagne, kransekage (an almond cake consisting of piled rings) and private displays of fireworks. With few exceptions, all shops stay closed by law from 3pm on Nytårsaftensdag, the day of Nytårsaften.

== Other observances ==
Although 1 May (May Day) is not an official public holiday in Denmark, it is commonly observed by workers in the public sector and trade unions. In cities like Copenhagen, especially in Fælledparken, the day is marked with public speeches, music, and community gatherings.
