= Public holidays in Lithuania =

All official holidays in Lithuania are established by acts of Seimas.

== Public holidays ==
The following are official holidays in Lithuania, that mean days off:

Public holidays in Lithuania
Date	English name	Local name	Remarks
1 January	New Year's Day	Naujųjų metų diena	
16 February	Day of Restoration of the State of Lithuania (1918)	Lietuvos valstybės atkūrimo diena	
11 March	Day of Restoration of Independence of Lithuania (1990)	Lietuvos nepriklausomybės atkūrimo diena	
Moveable Sunday	Easter Sunday	Velykos	Commemorates resurrection of Jesus. The first Sunday after the full moon that occurs on or soonest after 21 March.
The day after Easter Sunday	Easter Monday	Antroji Velykų diena	
1 May	International Workers' Day	Tarptautinė darbo diena	
First Sunday in May	Mother's Day	Motinos diena	
First Sunday in June	Father's Day	Tėvo diena	
24 June	St. John's Day / Day of Dew	Joninės / Rasos	Celebrated according to mostly pagan traditions (Midsummer Day, Saint Jonas Day).
6 July	Statehood Day	Valstybės (Lietuvos karaliaus Mindaugo karūnavimo) ir Tautiškos giesmės diena	Celebrates the 1253 coronation of Mindaugas, the first King of Lithuania, and the national anthem of Lithuania.
15 August	Assumption Day	Žolinė (Švenčiausios Mergelės Marijos ėmimo į dangų diena)	Also marked according to pagan traditions, celebrating the goddess Žemyna and noting the mid-August as the middle between summer and autumn.
1 November	All Saints' Day	Visų šventųjų diena	Halloween is increasingly popular and is also informally celebrated on the eve (31 October).
2 November	All Souls' Day	Mirusiųjų atminimo (Vėlinių) diena	
24 December	Christmas Eve	Kūčios	
25 and 26 December	Christmas Day	Kalėdos	Commemorates birth of Jesus.

== Commemorative Days ==
The list of other observances (Lithuanian: atmintinos dienos) is set by law and includes a total of 71 days, not including the public holidays above.
