= Public holidays in Austria =

This is a list of public holidays observed in Austria.

Date	English translation	Local name	Comment
1 January	New Year's Day	Neujahr	
6 January	Epiphany	Heilige Drei Könige	
Variable	Easter Monday	Ostermontag	
1 May	Labour Day	Staatsfeiertag	
Variable	Ascension Day	Christi Himmelfahrt	39 days after Easter Sunday
Variable	Whit Monday	Pfingstmontag	Descent of the Holy Ghost upon the Apostles, 49 and 50 days after the Resurrection of Christ
Variable	Corpus Christi	Fronleichnam	First Holy Eucharist Last Supper. Thursday after Trinity Sunday (60 days after Easter Sunday)
15 August	Assumption Day	Mariä Himmelfahrt	
26 October	National Day	Nationalfeiertag	Day of the Declaration of Neutrality
1 November	All Saints' Day	Allerheiligen	
8 December	Immaculate Conception	Mariä Empfängnis	Retail stores are allowed to open for Christmas shopping
25 December	Christmas Day	Christtag	
26 December	Saint Stephen's Day	Stefanitag	

Additional days are observed in some states or industries. Below are holidays observed in some federal states.

Date	English translation	Local name	Observed States
19 March	Saint Joseph's Day	Josef	Carinthia, Styria, Tyrol and Vorarlberg
4 May	Saint Florian's Day	Florian	Upper Austria
24 September	Saint Rupert's Day	Rupert	Salzburg
10 October	Plebiscite Day	Tag der Volksabstimmung	Carinthia
11 November	Saint Martin's Day	Martin	Burgenland
15 November	Saint Leopold's Day	Leopold	Lower Austria and Vienna
24 December	Christmas Eve	Weihnachten	All states, recognized as bank holiday but not a federal public holiday.
31 December	New Year's Eve	Silvester	All states, recognized as bank holiday but not a federal public holiday.
