= Public holidays in France =

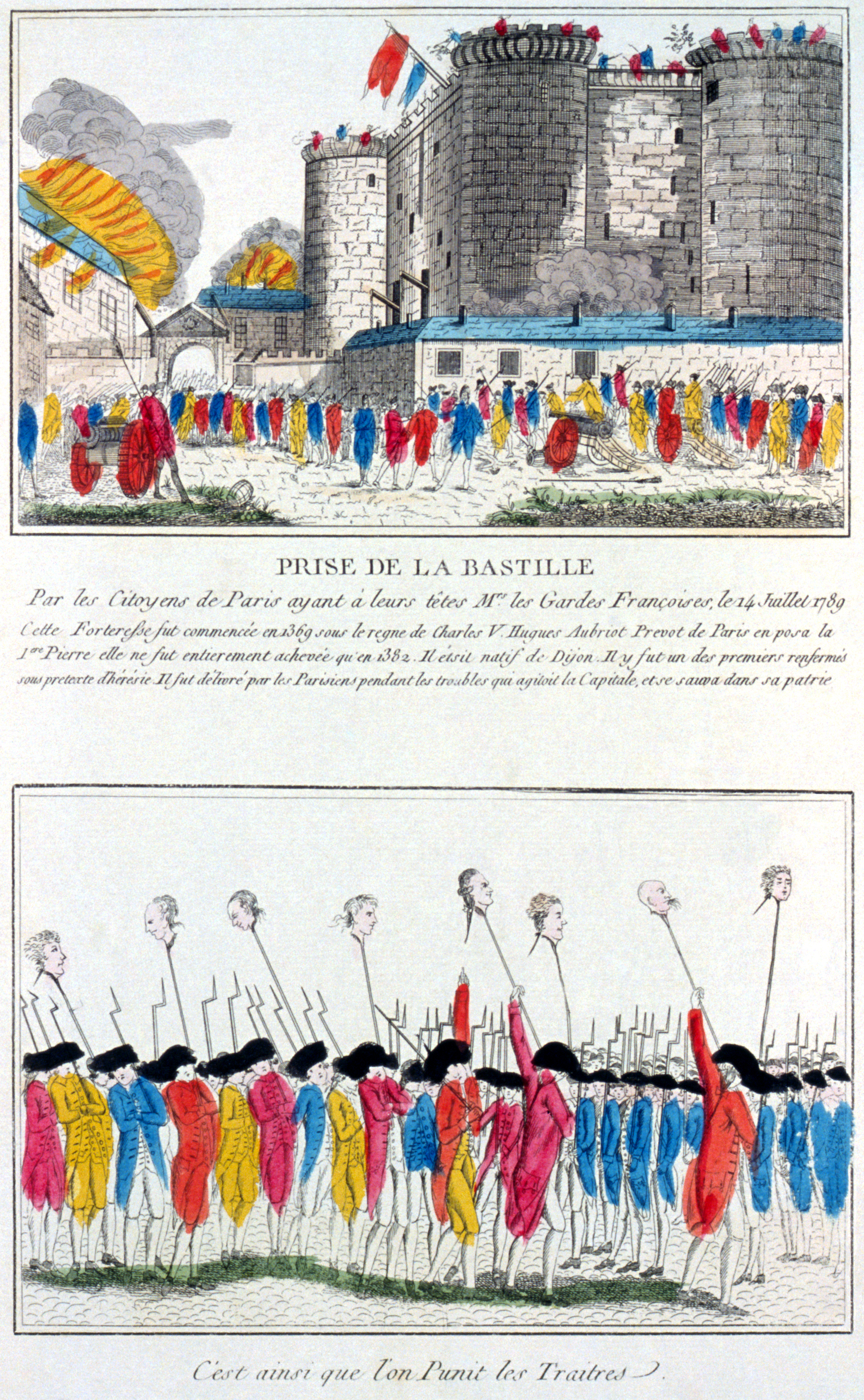
French etching from 1789 depicting the storming of the Bastille, commemorated as Bastille Day

There are eleven official public holidays in France, of which three are movable days which always fall on a weekday. The Alsace region and the Moselle department observe two additional days. These holidays do not shift when they fall during a weekend, which means that the average number of observed public holidays falling on weekdays (outside Alsace and Moselle) is 8.7 and ranges from seven to ten. Most Asian countries and all North American countries observe between two and ten more public holidays per year on weekdays.

== Public holidays in France ==
| Date | English name | Local name | Remarks |
|---|---|---|---|
| 1 January | New Year's Day | Jour de l'An | |
| moveable | Good Friday | Vendredi saint | Friday before Easter Sunday. Alsace and Moselle only. |
| moveable | Easter Monday | Lundi de Pâques | Monday after Easter Sunday (one day after Easter Sunday) |
| 1 May | Labour Day | Fête du Travail | |
| 8 May | Victory Day | Victoire 1945 | End of hostilities in Europe in World War II |
| moveable | Ascension Day | L'Ascension | Thursday, 39 days after Easter Sunday |
| moveable | Whit Monday | Lundi de Pentecôte | Monday after Pentecost (50 days after Easter), observed only in some businesses, see notes |
| 14 July | Bastille Day | Fête nationale française | French National Day, commemorates the 1789 Storming of the Bastille and the 1790 Feast of the Federation. |
| 15 August | Assumption Day | L'Assomption | Marks the Catholic feast of the Assumption of Mary, the taking up of Mary, mother of Jesus into heaven, body and soul. |
| 1 November | All Saints' Day | La Toussaint | |
| 11 November | Armistice Day | Armistice 1918 | End of the First World War |
| 25 December | Christmas | Noël | Newspapers are not published. Pubs, restaurants, shops, etc. closed all day by law. |
| 26 December | Saint Stephen's Day | Saint Étienne | Alsace and Moselle only. |

== Overseas territories ==
=== Guadeloupe ===
- Mi-Carême (mid-Lent); occurs on a Thursday, 22 days after Ash Wednesday; therefore, between 26 February and 1 April.
- Good Friday (Vendredi saint)
- Abolition of slavery: 27 May.

=== French Guiana ===
- Abolition of slavery: 10 June.

=== Martinique ===
- Abolition of slavery: 22 May.

=== New Caledonia ===
- Citizenship Day (Fête de la citoyenneté): 24 September.

=== French Polynesia ===
- Missionary Day (French: Arrivée de l'Évangile): 5 March.
- Matari'i (Tahitian: Matariʻi): 20 November.

=== Réunion ===
- Réunion Freedom Day (French: Fête réunionnaise de la liberté; Réunion Creole French: Fèt Kaf) 20 December.

=== Saint Barthélemy ===
- Abolition of slavery: 9 October.

=== Saint Martin ===
- Abolition of slavery: 28 May.

=== Wallis and Futuna ===
- Feast of Saint Peter Chanel: 28 April.
- Festival of the Territory: 29 July.

== Notes ==
Note: French law dictates that work should stop, but be paid only for the Fête du Travail (May Day, 1 May), except in industries where it is infeasible to stop working. The rest of the public holidays are listed in statute law, but law does not dictate that work should stop; however a leave from work may be granted by the employer or by convention collective, an agreement between employers' and employees' trade unions.

In 2005, French prime minister Jean-Pierre Raffarin removed Pentecost (Whit) Monday's status as a public holiday. This decision was eventually overruled by French courts in 2008. Employers are free to decide whether to make Whit Monday a day off or not.
