= Mercedes (name) =

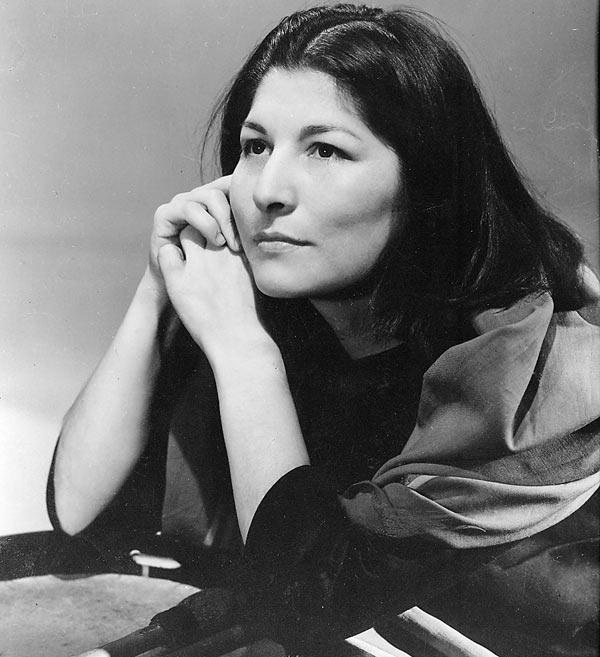
Mercedes Sosa (1935–2009), Argentine singer

Mercedes is a Spanish female name, popularized in the form of María de las Mercedes ("Our Lady of Mercy" or "Mary of Mercies"), which is one of the Roman Catholic titles of the Virgin Mary. The word "Mercedes" is of Latin origin meaning "mercies" (plural of mercy) from the Latin word merced-, merces, meaning "wages, reward", which in Vulgar Latin acquired the meaning "favor, pity". Hypocoristic forms of the name are Merceditas, Mechi, Mer, Meche and Merche.

== Given name ==
- Mercedes, Princess of Asturias (1880–1904), Spanish royal
- Mercedes de Acosta (1893–1968), American poet and socialite
- Mercedes Bass, American philanthropist
- Mercédes Benegbi (born 1962), Canadian disabilities activist
- Mercedes Bengoechea (born 1952), Spanish feminist sociolinguist, professor
- Mercedes Bresso (born 1944), Italian politician
- Mercedes Cabral (born 1986), Filipina actress
- Mercedes Calderón (born 1965), Cuban volleyball player
- Mercedes Castro (born 1972), Spanish writer
- Mercedes Grabowski (1994–2017), Canadian pornographic actress
- Mercedes Helnwein (born 1979), Austrian artist, writer and filmmaker
- Mercédesz Henger (born 1991), Italian-Hungarian actress, TV personality, influencer and model
- Mercedes Indacochea (1889–1959), Peruvian educator
- Mercédès Jellinek (1889–1929), the namesake for Mercedes-Benz automobiles
- Mercedes Lackey (born 1950), fantasy author
- Mercedes Lambre (born 1992), Argentine actress
- Mercedes Lander, drummer for Canadian alt-metal band Kittie
- Mercedes Lasala (1764 –1837), Argentinian patriot
- Mercédès Legrand (1893–1945) Spanish-born Belgian painter, poet
- Mercedes Leigh (b.1867 – ?), American actress
- Mercedes McCambridge (1916–2004), actress
- Mercedes Mason (born 1983), Swedish-American actress
- Mercedes McNab (born 1980), Canadian-born actress
- Maria Mercedes Morgan called Mercedes, later known as Gloria Morgan Vanderbilt (born 1904) Socialite.
- Mercedes of Orléans (1860–1878), queen consort of Spain
- Mercedes Pérez (born 1987), Colombian weightlifter
- Mercedes Pérez Merino (born 1960), Spanish trade unionist and politician
- Mercedes Peris (born 1985), Spanish backstroke swimmer
- Mercedes Rose (born 1972), American actress
- Mercedes Ruehl (born 1948), American actress
- Mercedes Sahores (born 1974), Argentine ski mountaineer and mountain climber
- Mercedes Santamarina (1896–1972), Argentine art collector
- Mercedes Sibanda (1966–2002), Zimbabwean footballer
- Mercedes Sosa (1935–2009), Argentine singer
- Mercédesz Stieber (born 1974), Hungarian water polo player
- Mercedes González Tola (1860–1911), Ecuadorian poet and playwright
- Mercedes Valdés Consuegra (1834–1934), Cuban independence fighter
- Mercedes Valenzuela (born 1974), Argentine politician
- Mercedes Varnado, American professional wrestler known under the ring name Mercedes Moné
- Mercedes Vostell (1933–2023), Spanish writer
- Mercedes Yvette Scelba-Shorte (born 1981), fashion model and actress
- Mercedes (singer), stage name of R&B and hip-hop singer Raequel Miller

== Surname ==
- Eleoncio Mercedes (1957–1985), boxer
- Denise Mercedes (born 1991), American fashion model
- Yermín Mercedes (born 1993), Dominican baseball player

== Fictional characters ==
- Mercédès, in the Alexandre Dumas novel The Count of Monte Cristo
- Mercedes, in Jack London's novel The Call of the Wild
- Mercédès, in the opera Carmen by Georges Bizet
- Mercedes, a princess in the video game "Dragon Blaze"
- Mercedes, a character in the film Pan's Labyrinth
- Mercedes, one of the five main characters of the video game Odin Sphere
- Mercedes "Meche" Colomar, from the video game Grim Fandango
- Mercedes Cortez, from the video game Grand Theft Auto: Vice City
- Mercedes, the Queen of elves and one of the six Heroes in the MMORPG MapleStory
- Mercedes Jones, from the TV series Glee
- Mercedes Lane, Heather Graham's character in the 1988 film License to Drive
- Mercedes von Martritz from the video games Fire Emblem: Three Houses and Fire Emblem Warriors: Three Hopes
- Mercedes McQueen, in the British soap opera Hollyoaks
- Mercedes "Mercy" Thompson, protagonist of a novel series by Patricia Briggs

== See also ==
- Mercedes (disambiguation)
- Marcedes Lewis (born 1984), American football player
- Mercedes-Benz German Car Producer
