= Santamarina =

Santamarina is a surname. Notable people with the surname include:

- Ángel Santamarina, Argentine fencer
- Eduardo Santamarina (born 1968), Mexican actor
- Enrique Santamarina (1870–1937), Argentine politician
- José Santamarina (born 1963), Argentine rugby union player
- Luis Santamarina (1942–2017), Spanish cyclist
- Mercedes Santamarina (1896–1972), Argentine art collector
- Ramon Santamarina (1827–1904), Argentine businessman

== See also ==
- Club y Biblioteca Ramón Santamarina or Santamarina, a football club named for the Argentine businessman, in Tandil, Buenos Aires Province
- Santa Marina (disambiguation)
