= Mercedes =

Mercedes may refer to:

== People ==
- Mercedes (name), a Spanish feminine name, including a list of people and fictional characters with the given name or last name

== Automobile-related ==
- Mercedes (marque), the pre-1920 brand name of German automobile models and engines that are built by Daimler Motors company
- Mercedes-Benz, the post-1920 German brand of automobiles, engines, and trucks now owned by the Mercedes-Benz Group
- Mercedes-AMG, a subsidiary of Daimler AG that builds customized and high performance Mercedes-branded automobiles
- Mercedes-Benz in Formula One, the Mercedes Formula One racing team, currently known as Mercedes-AMG Petronas Motorsport
- Mercedes-Benz in motorsport, its activities in sportscar racing, rallying, Formula Three, DTM, V8 Supercars Australia and Formula One
- American Mercedes (1904 automobile), a company licensed to build Mercedes automobiles in America

== Places ==
- Mercedes, Buenos Aires Province, Argentina
  - Mercedes Partido, Argentina
- Mercedes, Corrientes, Argentina
  - Mercedes Department, Argentina
- Mercedes, Costa Rica
- Mercedes, Camarines Norte, Philippines
- Mercedes, Eastern Samar, Philippines
- Mercedes, Texas, United States
- Mercedes, Uruguay
- Mercedes Formation (disambiguation), geological formations in South America
- Villa Mercedes, San Luis province, Argentina

== Ships ==
- Nuestra Señora de las Mercedes, a Spanish frigate sunk in 1804 off the coast of Portugal and thought to be discovered by the Odyssey Marine Exploration
- Spanish cruiser Reina Mercedes, an Alfonso XII-class unprotected cruiser of the Spanish Navy, scuttled in 1898 and later salvaged by the United States Navy
- MV Mercedes I, a freighter shipwrecked off Florida in 1984
- USS Mercedes (YT-108), scuttled on 2 January 1942.
- BAP Mercedes, a Peruvian Navy frigate in service from the 1840s to the 1850s
- RFA Mercedes, a collier which served with the Royal Fleet Auxiliary, see List of replenishment ships of the Royal Fleet Auxiliary

== Arts, entertainment, and media ==
=== Films ===
- Mercedes (1933 film), a lost film, the first Spanish "talkie" film, directed by José María Castellví
- Mercedes (1993 film), an Egyptian-Swiss film directed by Yousry Nasrallah
- Mercedes, a 1998 Iranian film directed by Masoud Kimiai

=== Songs ===
- "Mercedes" (Becky G and Oscar Maydon song)", 2024
- "Mercedes" (BlocBoy JB song)", 2019
- "Mercedes" (Brent Faiyaz song)", 2021
- "Mercedes", a song by Deadmau5 from the 2014 album While(1<2)
- "Mercedes", a song by Joseph Arthur from the 1997 album Big City Secrets

== Other uses ==
- Mercedes, a proposed gossamer-winged butterfly genus nowadays again included in Calycopis
- Mercedes College (Adelaide), South Australia
- Mercedes College, Perth, Western Australia

== See also ==
- Mr. Mercedes, a 2014 detective novel by Stephen King
- Mercedes-Euklid, an early 20th-century computing device
- Mercedita (disambiguation)
- Merced (disambiguation)
