= Antonio del Castillo y Saavedra =

Spanish Baroque painter, sculptor, and poet

- Born: 10 July 1616; Córdoba, Spain
- Died: 2 February 1668 (aged 51); Córdoba, Spain
- Known for: painting, sculpture
- Movement: Baroque

Antonio del Castillo y Saavedra (10 July 1616 – 2 February 1668) was a Spanish Baroque painter, sculptor, and poet.

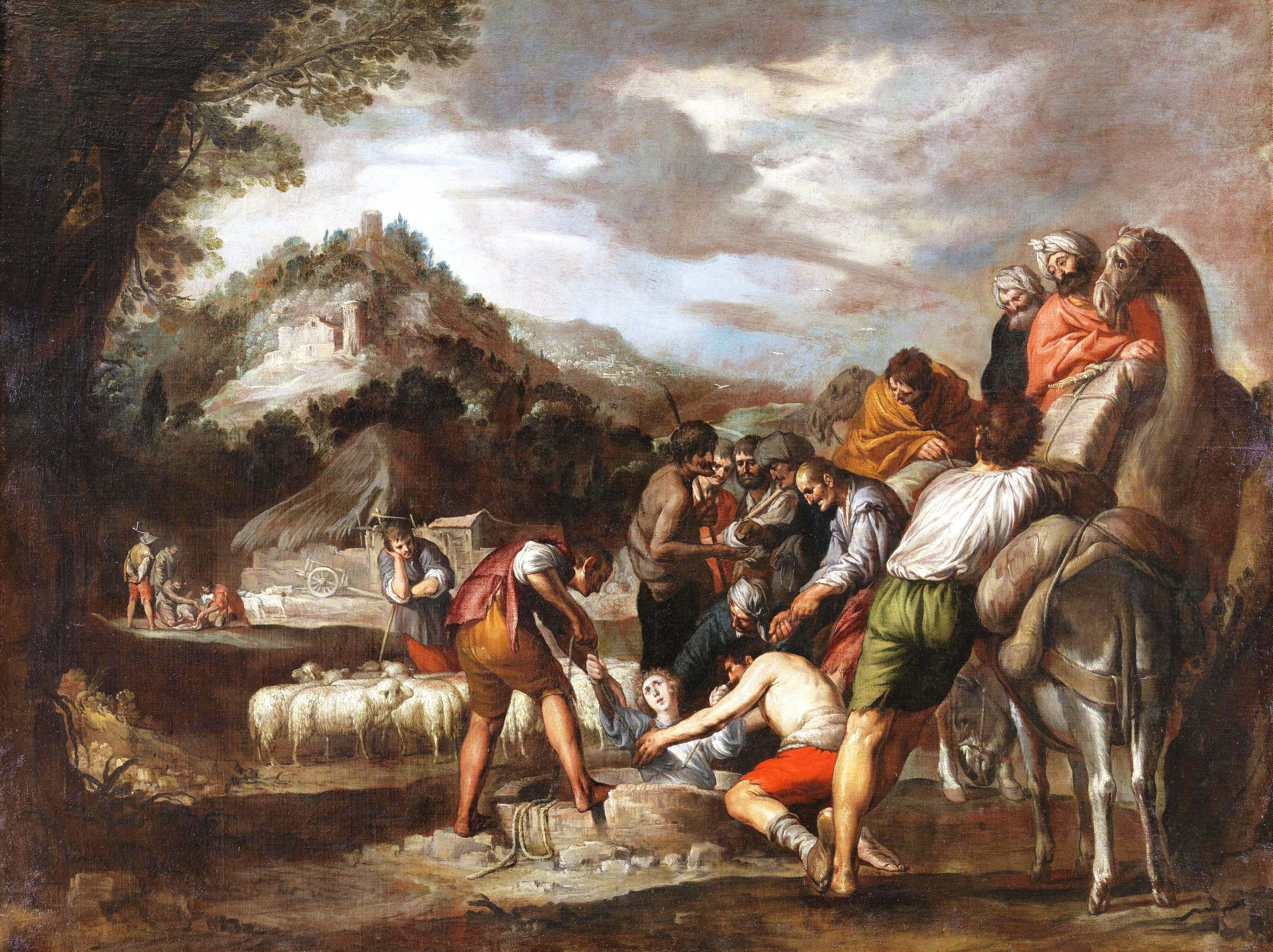
Antonio del Castillo y Saavedra, Joseph Sold by his Brothers, c. 1660.

== Biography ==
Antonio del Castillo y Saavedra was born at Córdoba, Spain.

He trained in painting under his father Agustín del Castillo, and after his death by a little-known religious painter named Ignacio Aedo Calderón from 1631 to 1634. Later he was taught in Seville by Francisco de Zurbarán and by his uncle Juan del Castillo, who was also teacher of Cano, Murillo and De Moya. In 1635 he returned to Córdoba, where he painted frescoes and oil paintings (such as those in the church of Santa Marina).

He died at Córdoba in 1668.

== Gallery ==
=== Monumental staircase in the convent of San Pablo ===
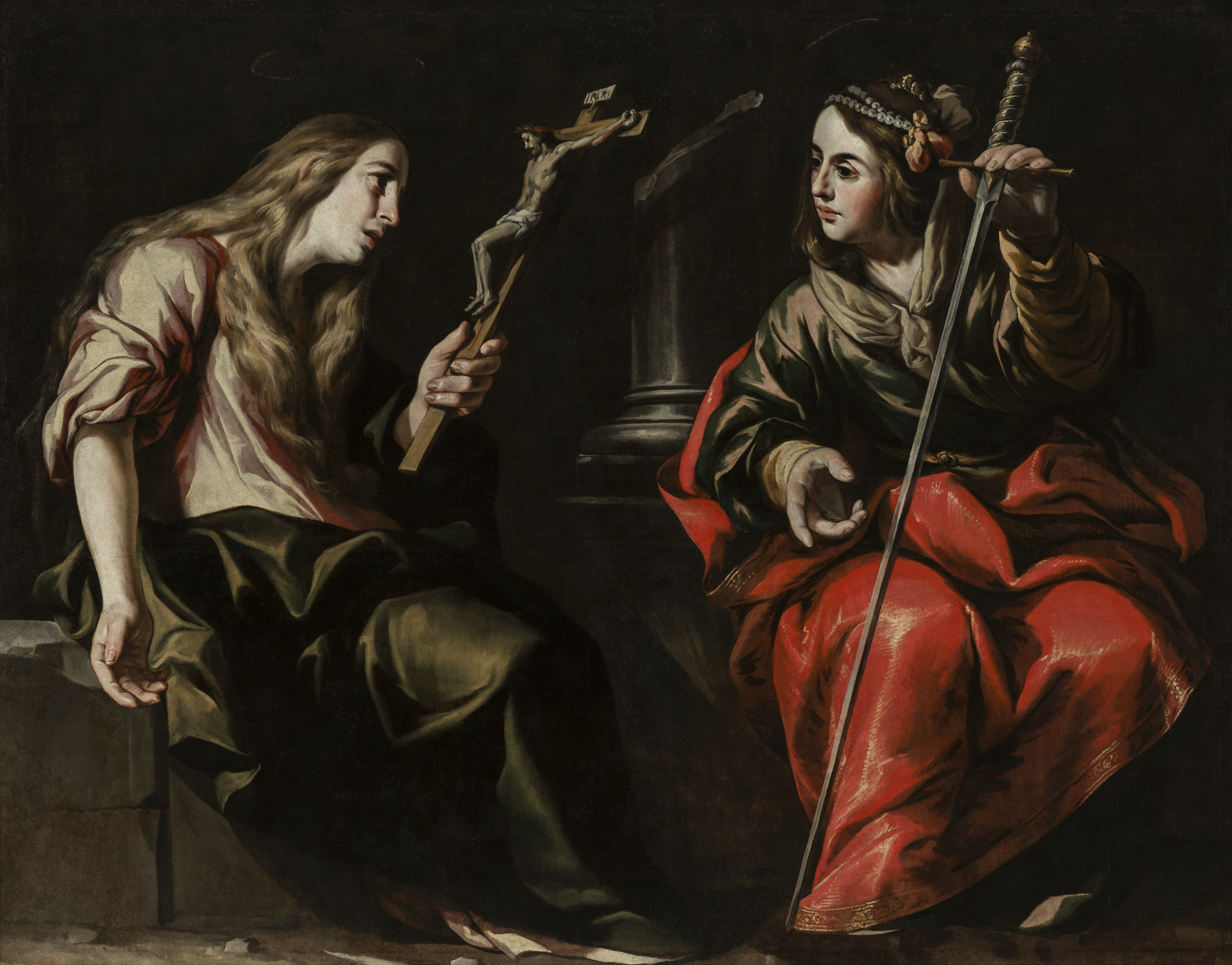
Santa María Magdalena y Santa Catalina

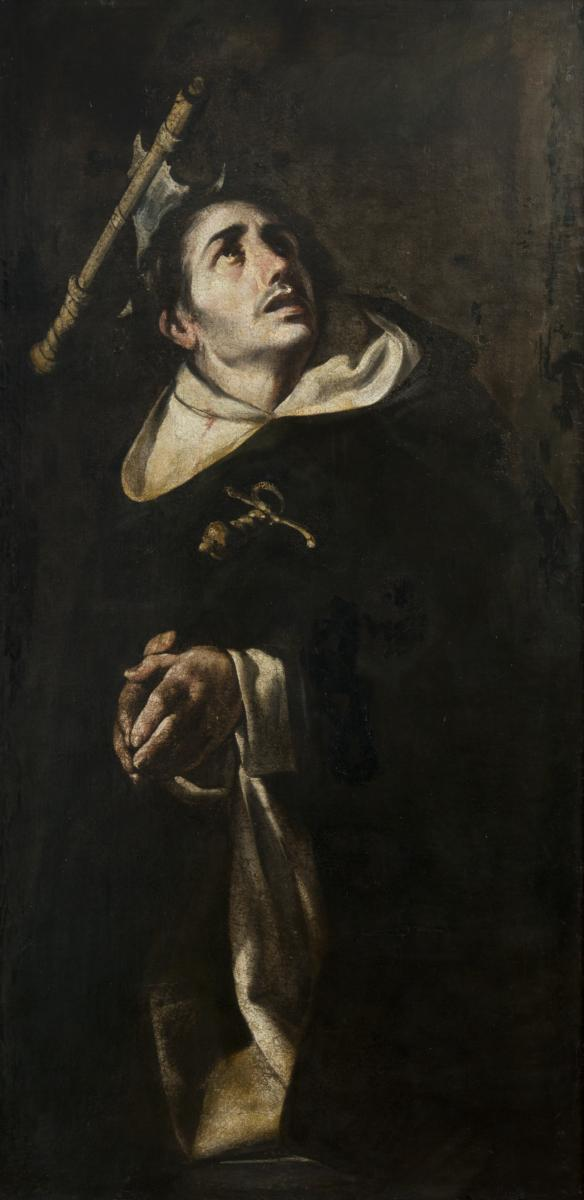
San Pedro Mártir

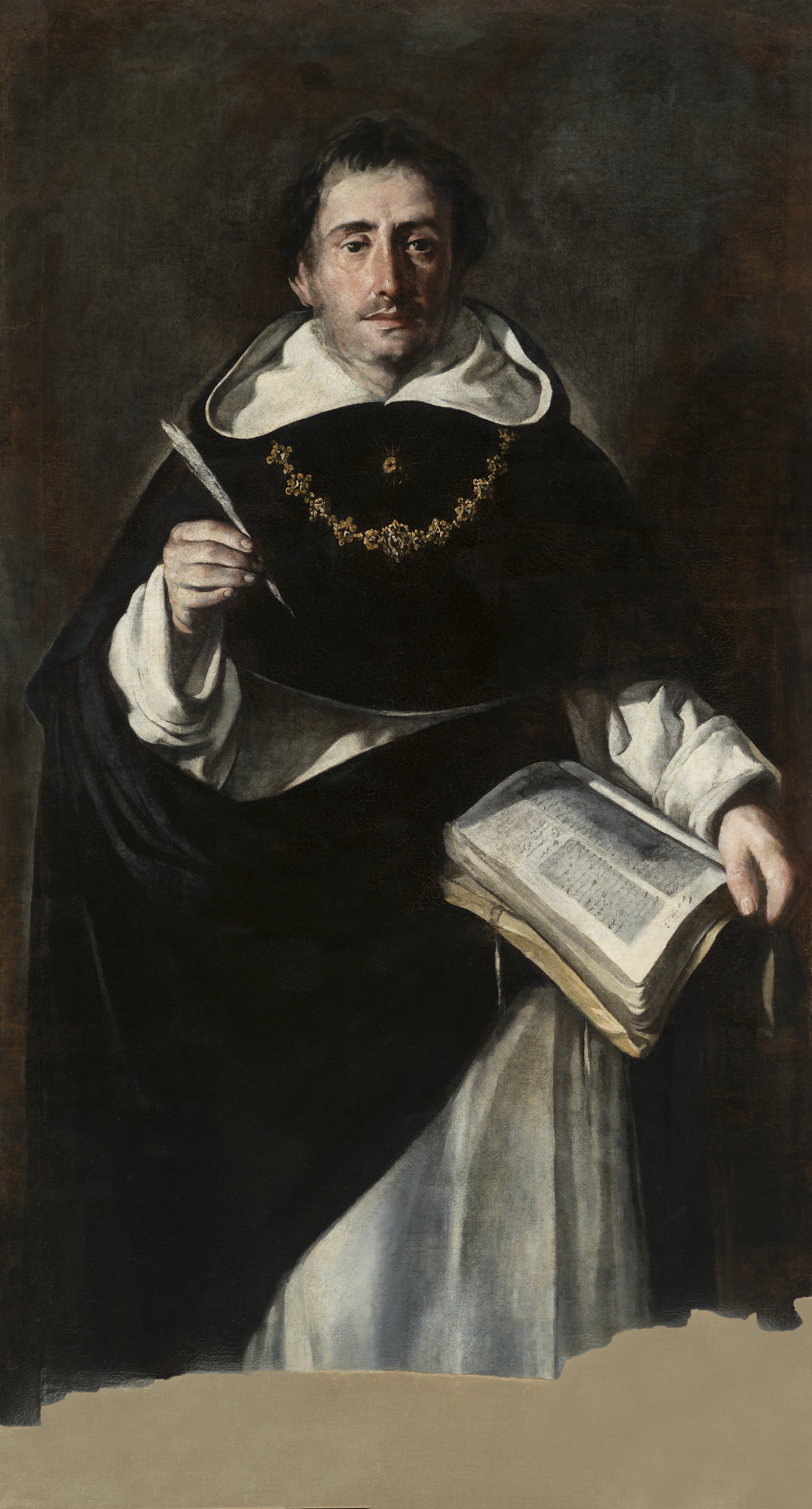
Santo Tomás de Aquino

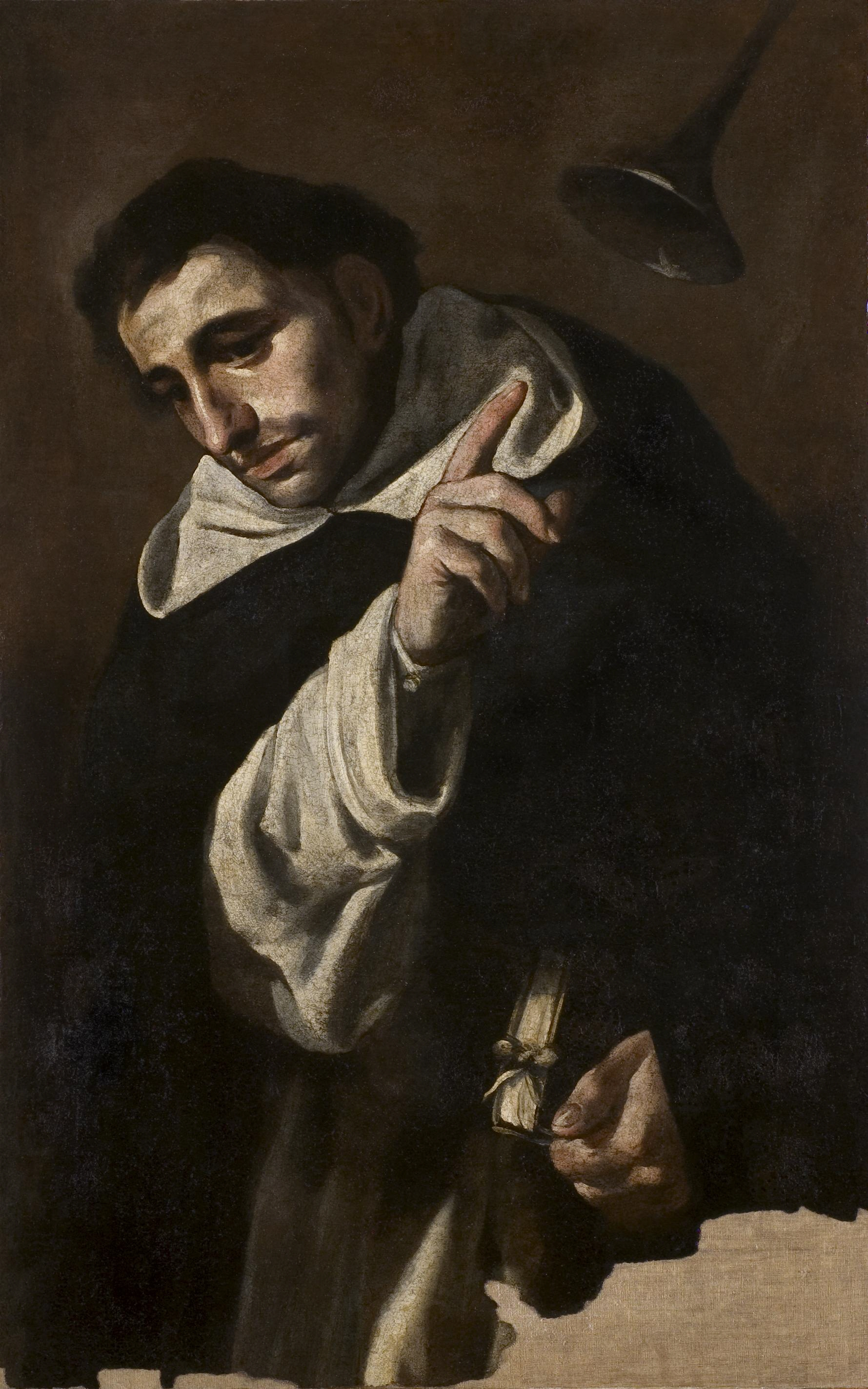
San Vicente Ferrer

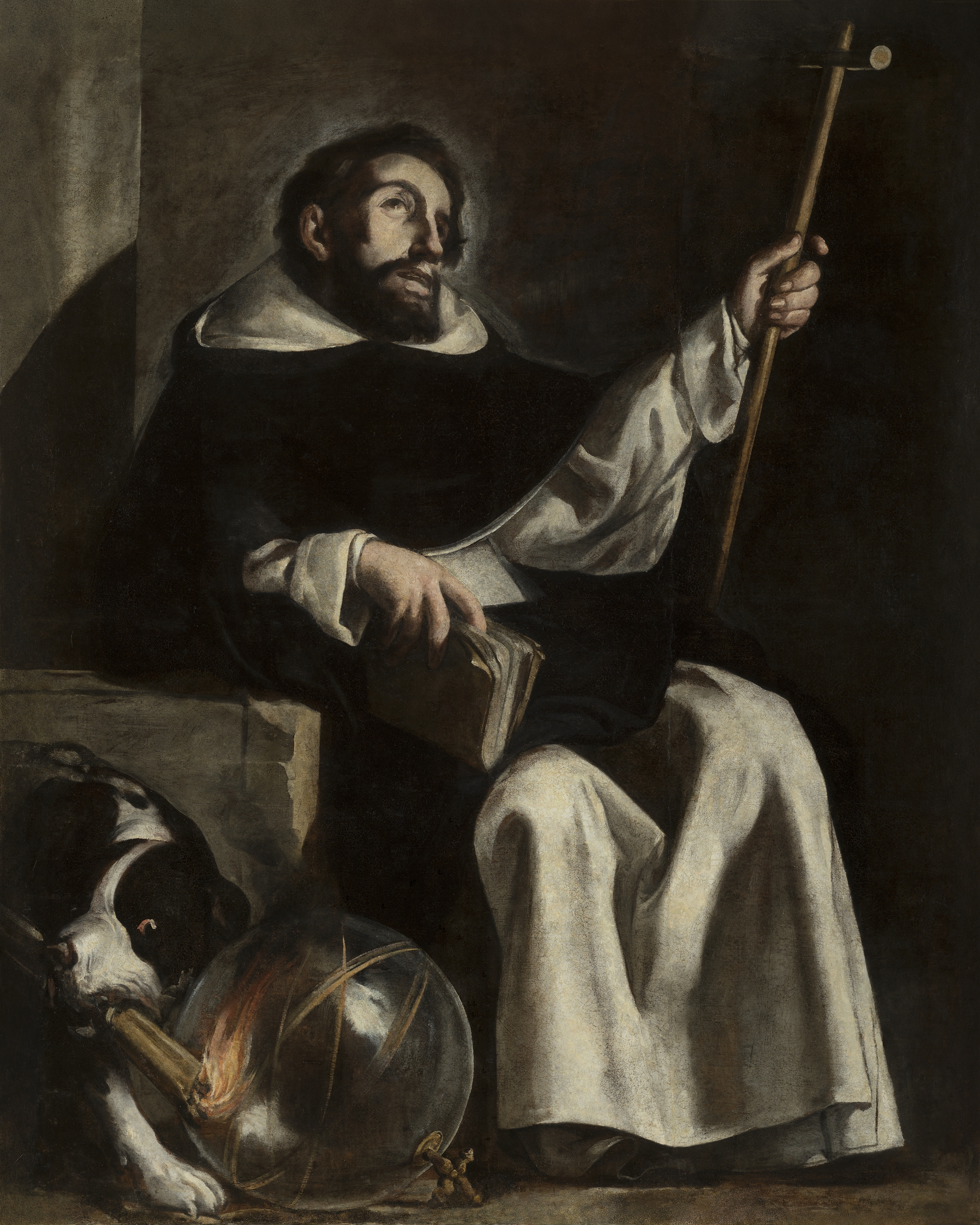
Santo Domingo de Guzmán

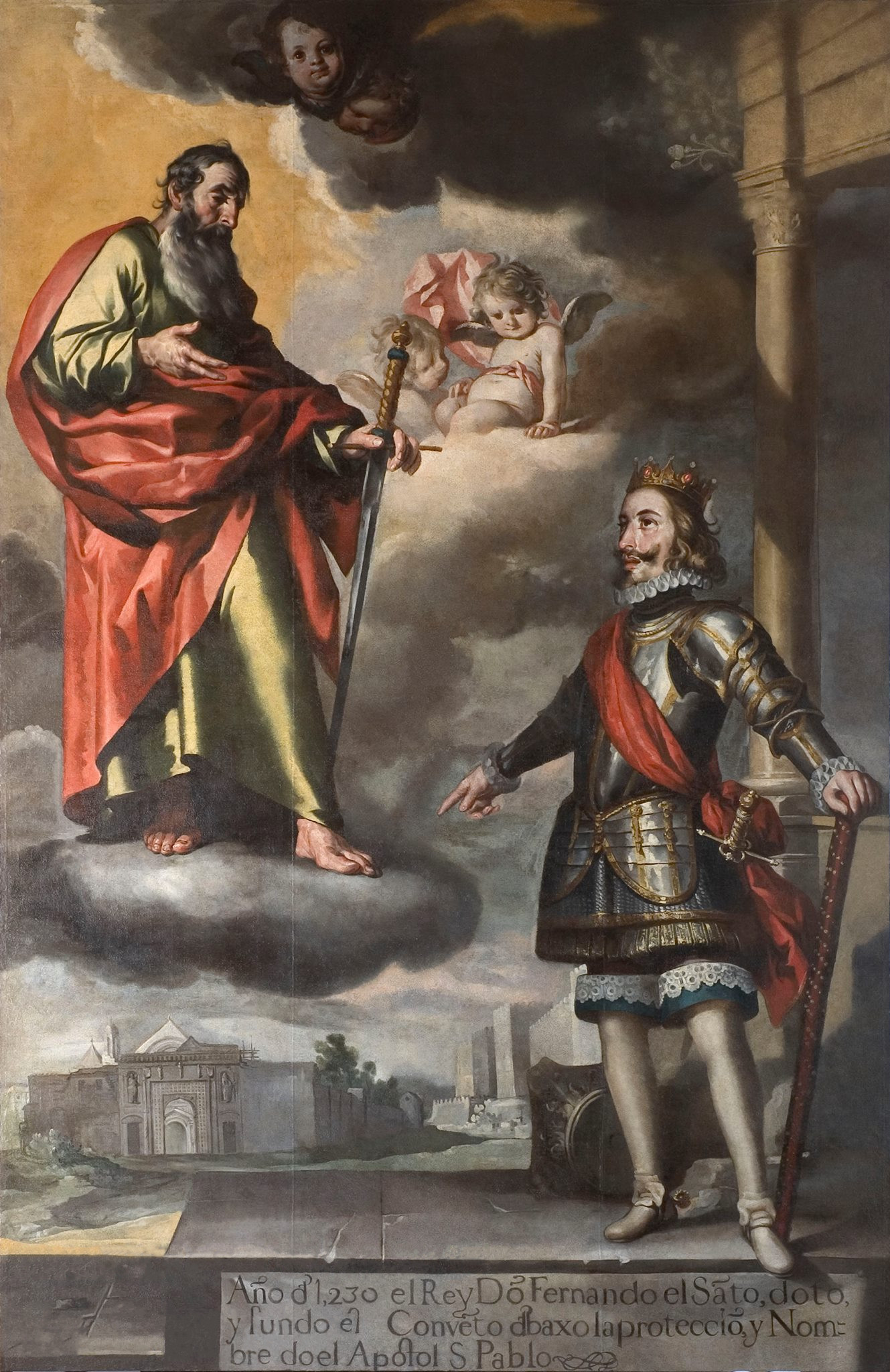
Aparición de San Pablo a San Fernando

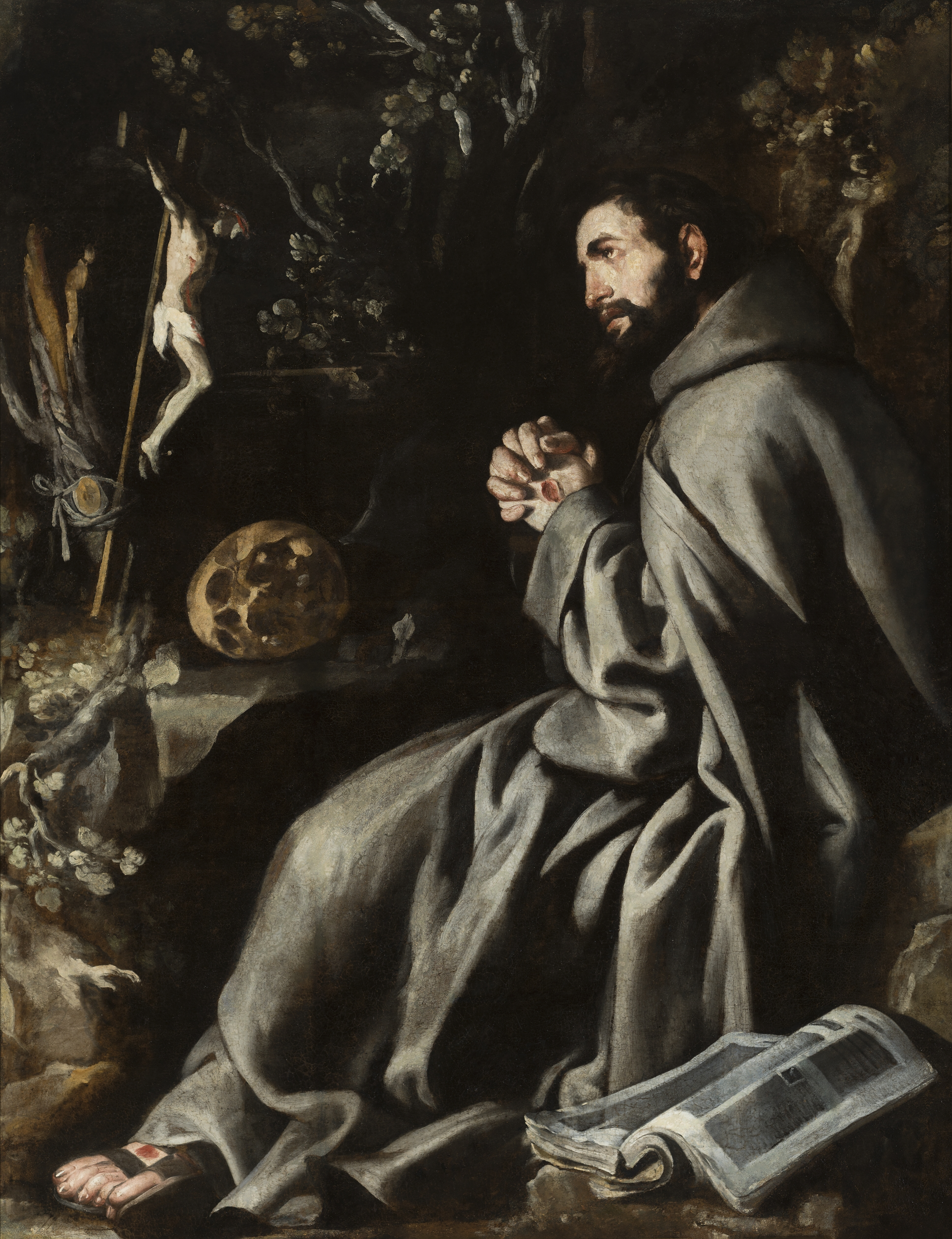
San Francisco de Asís

Three final paintings missing: San Antonio de Padua, San Buenaventura and San Bernardino de Siena.
