= Santa Marina =

Santa Marina can refer to:

- Santa Marina Salina, a town on the Eolian Island, Italy
- Santa Marina, Campania, a town and comune in Campania, Italy
- Santa Marina (Córdoba), a church in Córdoba, Spain
- Santa Marina (Noreña), a parish in Noreña, Asturias, Spain
- Santa Marina (Cangas del Narcea), a parish in Cangas del Narcea, Asturias, Spain
- Santamarina, a surname
- Club y Biblioteca Ramón Santamarina or Santamarina, a football club in Tandil, Buenos Aires Province, Argentina

== See also ==
- Marina (disambiguation)
- Saint Marina (disambiguation)
