= Agia Marina =

Agia Marina may refer to several locations:

In Greece:

- Agia Marina, Achaea, in the municipal unit Tritaia, Achaea
- Agia Marina, Crete, near Chania, Crete
- Agia Marina, Elis, in Elis
- Agia Marina, Kavala, in Kavala (regional unit)
- Agia Marina, Leros, in Leros, Aegean Islands
- Agia Marina, Zakynthos, on Zakynthos, Ionian Islands
- Agia Marina, Kasos, on Kasos, Dodecanese

In Cyprus:

- Agia Marina (Skylloura), in Northern Cyprus
- Agia Marina, Nicosia, in Nicosia District
- Ayia Marina Khrysokhous, in Paphos District, north of Polis
- Ayia Marina Kelokedharon, in Paphos District, northeast of Paphos

Ships

- SS Agia Marina, a Hansa A Type cargo ship in service 1966-67

== See also ==
- Saint Marina (disambiguation)
