= Juan del Castillo (painter) =

Spanish Baroque painter

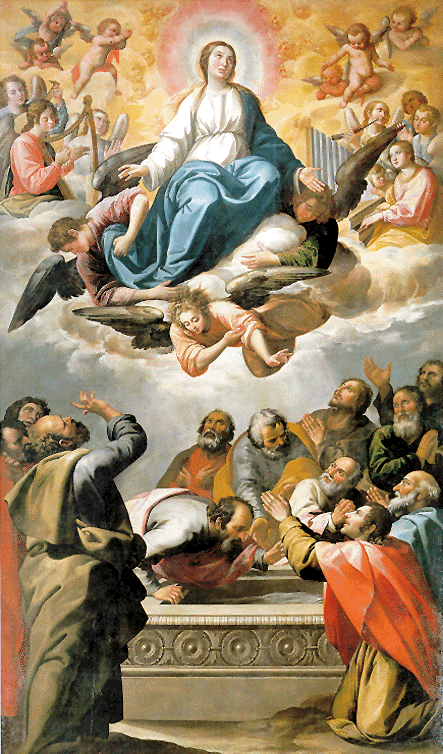
Assumption of the Virgin, Museo de Bellas Artes de Sevilla.

Juan del Castillo (c. 1590 – c. 1657) was a Spanish Baroque painter. Many of his paintings became famous during his time due to his pupil, Bartolomé Esteban Murillo.

Del Castillo was the youngest brother of the painter Agustín. Both were trained in painting by Luis Fernández in Seville. Afterwards he painted religious frescoes and oil paintings around Seville, and also in Granada and Cádiz.

Amongst his students were his brother-in-law Alonso Cano and his nephew Antonio, as well as Bartolomé Esteban Murillo, Pedro de Moya, Andro de Medina and Juan de Valdés Leal. His work was influenced by Venetian style.
