= Agustín del Castillo =

Spanish Baroque painter (1565–1626)

- Born: 1565; Seville, Spain
- Died: 1626 (aged 60–61); Córdoba, Spain
- Known for: Painting
- Movement: Baroque
- Children: Antonio del Castillo y Saavedra
- Relatives: Juan del Castillo (brother)

Agustín del Castillo (1565–1626) was a Spanish Baroque painter.

Del Castillo was born in Seville, Spain, and was an older brother of the painter Juan del Castillo. Both brothers were trained in painting by Luis Fernández in Seville. Afterwards he moved to Córdoba, where he painted religious frescoes and oil paintings. Most of his works were destroyed.

Castillo died in Córdoba, Spain. His son Antonio became also a notable artist.
