= Mercedes Valdés =

Mercedes Valdés may refer to:

- Mercedes Valdés Consuegra (1834–1934), figure in the Cuban War of Independence
- Mercedes Valdés Cuevas (1843–1926), Chilean philanthropist and first lady
- Merceditas Valdés (Mercedes Valdés Granit, 1922–1996), Cuban singer
