= María de las Mercedes =

María de las Mercedes, often shortened to simply Mercedes, is a Spanish given name. It refers to the Virgin of Mercy (Spanish: La Virgen de la Merced or Nuestra Señora de las Mercedes), one of the titles of Mary.

Notable people with this given name include:

- Mercedes of Orléans (Maria de las Mercedes of Orléans), (1860 – 1878) was Queen of Spain
- Princess María de las Mercedes of Bourbon-Two Sicilies (1910–2000)
- María de las Mercedes, Princess of Asturias (María de las Mercedes de Borbón y Habsburgo-Lorena) (1880–1904)
- Maria de las Mercedes of Bavaria and Bourbon (1911–1953)
- María de las Mercedes Barbudo (1773–1849), Puerto Rican political activist, the first woman Independentista in the island
- María de las Mercedes Adam de Aróstegui (1873–1957)
- Maria de las Mercedes Santa Cruz y Montalvo (1789–1852)

== Dominican Republic ==
The Feast of the Our Lady of Mercedes of is a national holiday on September 24 in the Dominican Republic.

== See also ==
- María Mercedes (disambiguation)
