= La Merced =

La Merced (Spanish for: The Mercy) may refer to:

== Argentina ==
- La Merced, Catamarca, Paclín Department
- La Merced, Salta, Cerrillos Department

== Colombia ==
- La Merced, Caldas

== Guatemala ==
- La Merced Church, in Antigua Guatemala

== Mexico ==
- La Merced (neighborhood), Mexico City
  - La Merced Cloister
  - La Merced Market
  - La Merced (Mexico City Metrobús)

== Peru ==
- La Merced, Junín
- La Merced, Aija, Ancash Region
- La Merced District, Aija, Ancash Region
- La Merced District, Churcampa, Huancavelica Region
- La Merced Hill, Madre de Dios, Madre de Dios Region
- La Merced, Lima, a neighborhood in the district of Ate in Lima

== United States ==
- La Merced (schooner) a ship listed on the U.S. National Register of Historic Places; its derelict hull is in Anacortes, Washington.

== See also ==
- Merced (disambiguation)
- De la Merced (disambiguation)
