= María Mercedes =

María Mercedes or Maria Mercedes may refer to:

Television

- María Mercedes (Mexican TV series), a 1992 telenovela starring Thalía
  - "Maria Mercedes" (song), its theme song, performed by Thalía
  - Maria Mercedes (Philippine TV series), a Philippine remake based on the Mexican telenovela

People

- Mercedes of Orléans, "María de las Mercedes d'Orléans y Borbón" (1860–1878), queen consort of Spain
- Mercedes, Princess of Asturias, "Infanta Maria de las Mercedes" (1880–1904), heiress-presumptive of Spain
- Maria Mercedes (actress), Australian actress
- María Mercedes Cabal (1819–1904), Second Lady of Colombia
- Maria Mercedes Cabral (born 1986), Filipino actress
- María Mercedes Capa Estrada (born 1980), Spanish golf ball player
- María Mercedes Carranza (1945–2003), Colombian writer and poet
- María Mercedes Coroy (born 1994), Guatemalan actress
- María Mercedes Corral Aguilar (born 1947), Mexican politician
- María Mercedes Cuesta (born 1973), Ecuadorian journalist and politician
- María Mercedes Maciel Ortiz (born 1959), Mexican politician
- Maria Mercedes Ortoll, Spanish writer
- María Mercedes Pacheco (born 1976), Ecuadorian actress
- María Mercedes, an athlete from the Dominican Republic; for further information, see 1997 Central American and Caribbean Championships in Athletics
