= USS Mercedes =

History

Spain
- Name: Mercedes
- Namesake: Mercedes
- Launched: unknown
- Fate: captured by the United States, May 1898, assigned to Customs Department

Commonwealth of the Philippines
- Name: Mercedes
- Fate: transferred to United States Navy, 15 November 1902

United States Navy
- Name: Mercedes
- Commissioned: 15 November 1902
- Reclassified: YT-108, 17 July 1920
- Honours and awards: 1 Battle Stars; American Defense Service Medal; Asiatic-Pacific Campaign Medal; World War II Victory Medal; Philippine Defense Medal
- Fate: scuttled, 2 January 1942

General characteristics
- Length: 53.5 ft (16.3 m) o/a
- Beam: 9.17 ft (2.80 m)
- Draught: 3.83 ft (1.17 m)
- Propulsion: steam, single screw

USS Mercedes was a harbor tug of the United States Navy that served during World War II.

== History ==
She was built by the Spanish in the Philippines and captured by the United States at the Cavite Naval Yard in May 1898 during the Spanish–American War. She was turned over to the Customs Department of the Commonwealth of the Philippines. On 15 November 1902, she was transferred to the United States Navy and assigned to the Cavite Naval Yard, 16th Naval District, United States Asiatic Fleet. On 17 July 1920, she was designated as District Harbor Tug YT-108. On 2 January 1942, she was intentionally scuttled to prevent capture during the Japanese occupation of the Philippines.

She earned one battle star.
