= Consuegra (surname) =

Consuegra is a surname. Notable people with the surname include:

- Agustín Díaz De Mera García Consuegra (born 1947), Spanish politician
- Cara Consuegra (born 1979), American basketball coach
- David Consuegra (1939–2004), Colombian graphic designer and illustrator
- Hugo Consuegra (born 1929), Cuban-American architect and artist
- Rafael Consuegra (born 1941), US-based Cuban artist
- Sandy Consuegra (1920–2005), Cuban-born American baseball player
