= Mercedita =

Mercedita is a common forename derived from Mercedes. It may refer to:

- Mercedita International Airport, an international commercial airport in Ponce, Puerto Rico
- Hacienda Mercedita, a now defunct sugar mill and refinery plantation in Ponce, Puerto Rico
- USS Mercedita, a wooden steamer that served in the United States Navy during the American Civil War.

== See also ==
- Merceditas Gutierrez, Philippine government official
