= Necochea Partido =

Necochea Partido Partido de Necochea
- Department
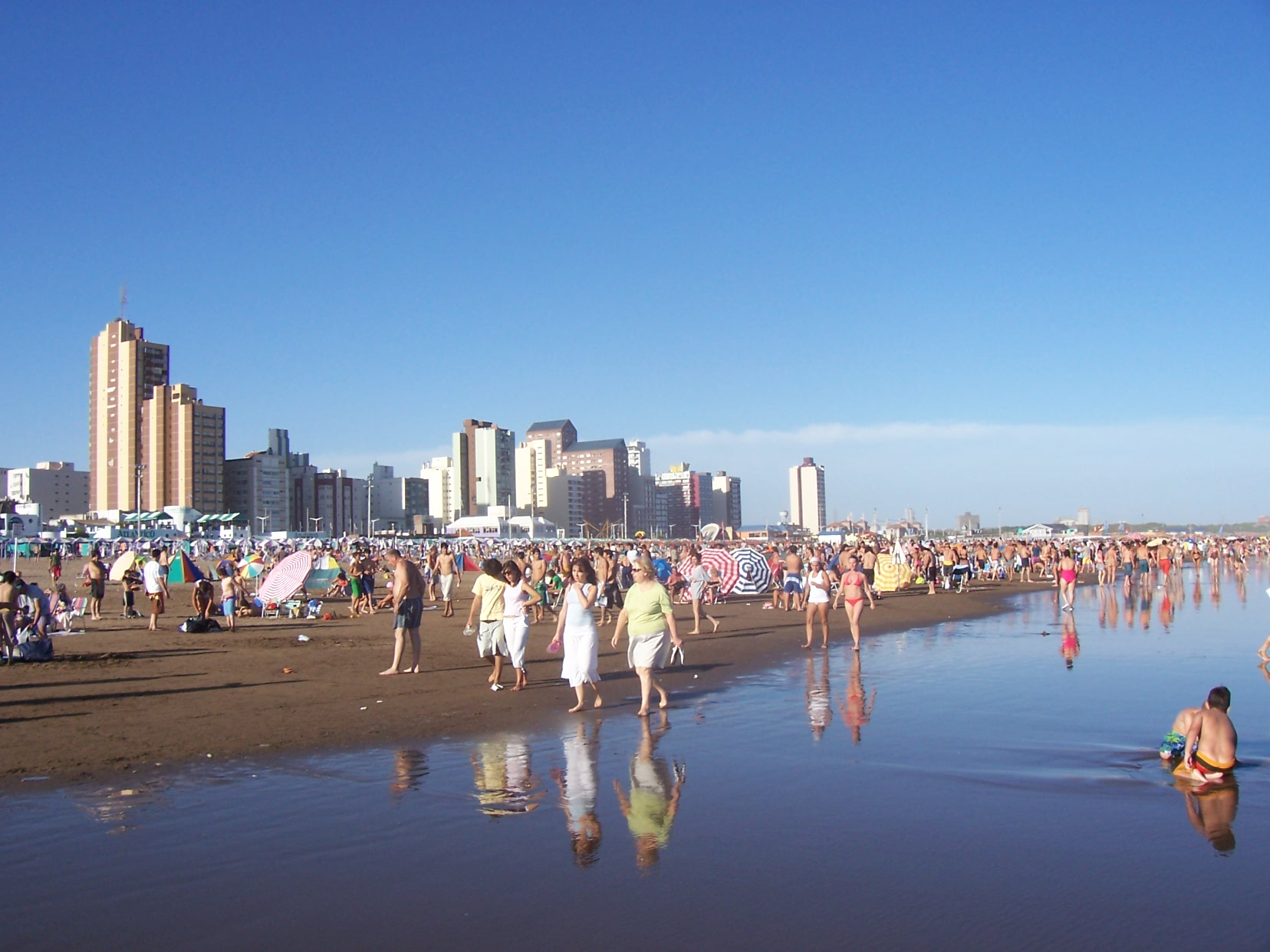
- Necochea beachfront

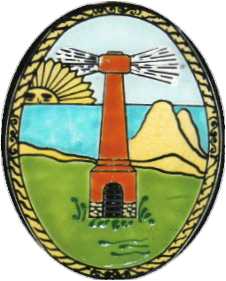
- Coat of arms

- location of Necochea Partido in Buenos Aires Province
- Coordinates: 38°33′S 58°44′W
- Country: Argentina
- Established: July 19, 1865
- Founder: Ángel Ignacio Murga
- Seat: Necochea

Government
  - Intendant: Arturo Rojas (Nueva Necochea)

Area
  - Total: 4,455 km^{2} (1,720 sq mi)
- Elevation: 16 m (52 ft)

Population (2022)
  - Total: 104,977
  - Density: 23.56/km^{2} (61.03/sq mi)
- Demonym: necochense
- Postal Code: B7630
- IFAM: BUE088
- Area Code: 02262
- Patron saint: Virgen del Carmen
- Website: www.necochea.gov.ar

Necochea is a coastal partido and city area in the southeast of the Buenos Aires Province, Argentina. The seat of the municipality is the port of Necochea.

The partido has a population of around 104,977 people, in an area of 4,455 km^{2} (1,720 sq mi). In the census of 2001 Neochea Partido had a population density of exactly 20.00 inhabitants per square kilometre (51.8/sq mi).

== Geography ==
As of 2001 the district had about 90,000 inhabitants. The district covers an area of 4,455 km^{2} (1,720 sq mi) and lies about 530 kilometres (330 mi) south of Buenos Aires.

== History ==
The partido was founded on July 19, 1865, and the settlement was founded on October 12, 1881, by Ángel Ignacio Murga.

The town of Necochea obtained its status as a city on July 26, 1911.

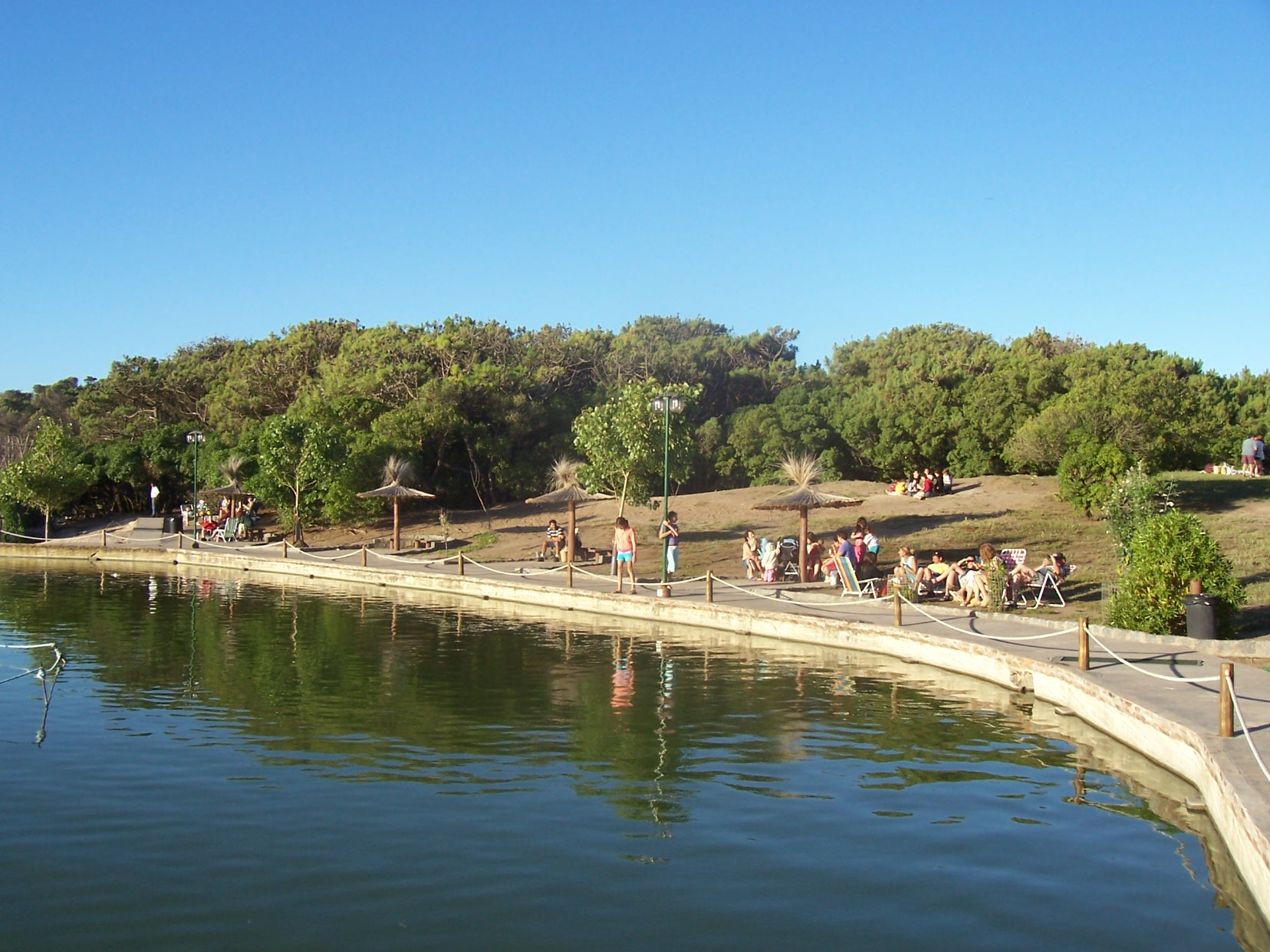
El lago de los Cisnes (Swan's Lake).

== Geography ==
The partido has a salt-water lake known as El Lago de los Cisnes, (Swan's Lake).

== Economy ==
The economy of Necochea benefits from an influx of tourists from Gran Buenos Aires during the summer vacation season (December–February).

The main elements of the non-tourist economy are farming, the production of agricultural chemicals and biodiesel.

== Settlements ==
- Necochea
- Balneario Los Ángeles
- Balneario Costa Bonita
- Energía
- La Dulce
- Juan Nepomuceno Fernández
- Ramón Santamarina

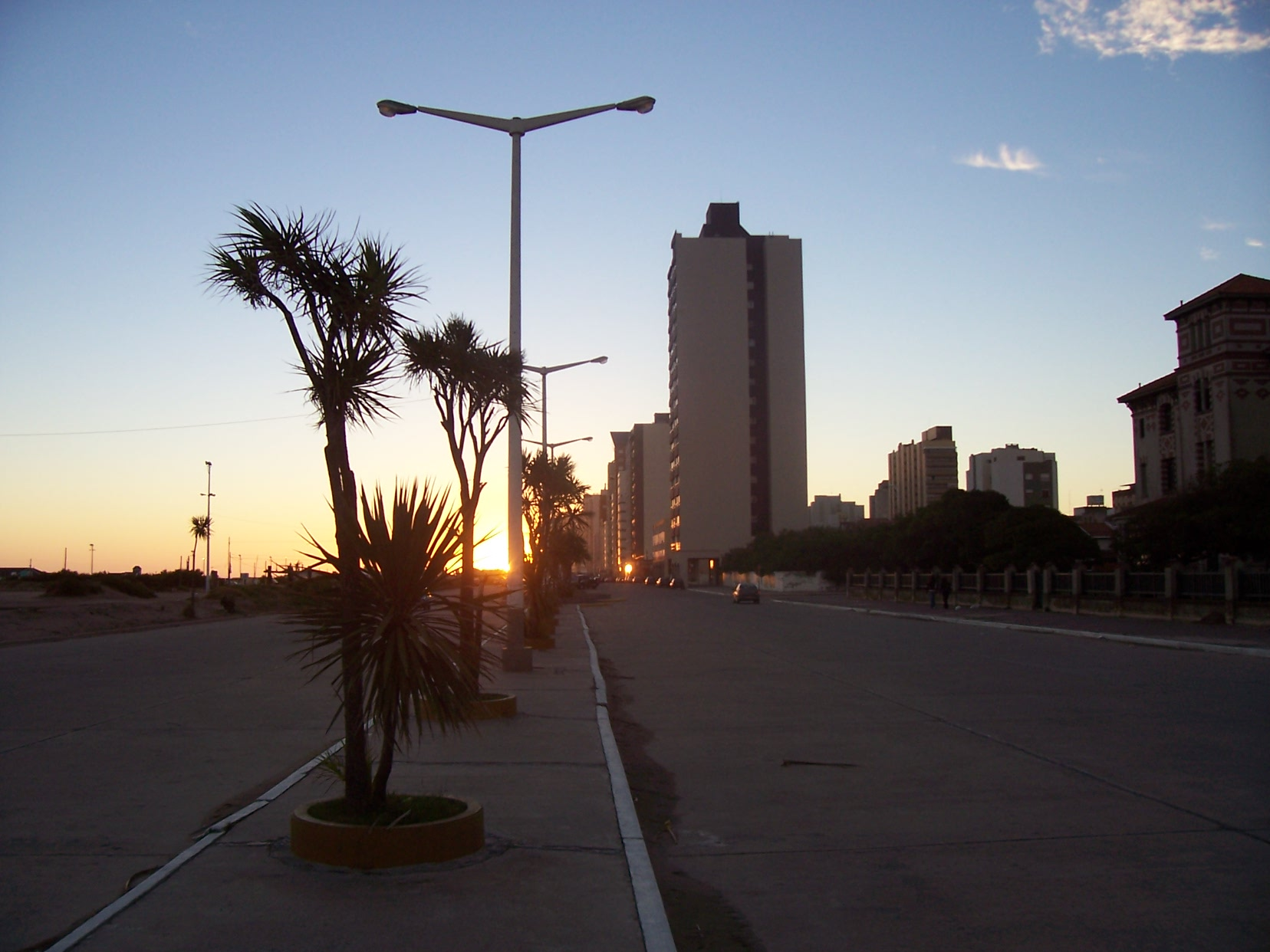
Avenida 2 -Second Avenue, one of the main roads of the city of Necochea, head of the partido.
