= Merced (disambiguation) =

Merced, California is a city in Merced County, California.

Merced (Spanish for mercy) can also refer to:

== Locations ==
=== In Merced, California ===
- Merced College
- Merced County, California
- Merced Falls, California, an unincorporated community in Merced County, California
- Merced Regional Airport
- Merced Theatre (Merced, California)
- University of California, Merced

=== Other locations ===
- Merced River in California
- Lake Merced in San Francisco, California
- Merced (district), a district of the San José canton and province of Costa Rica
- Merced metro station, in Mexico City
- Merced Peak

== People ==
- Isabela Merced (born 2001), American actress
- Nelson Merced (born 1947), Latino politician and activist
- Orlando Merced (born 1966), American baseball player
- Wilnelia Merced (born 1957), Puerto Rican beauty queen

== Other ==
- Merced, the pre-release codename for the original Itanium processor
- Order of Merced, a Catholic order founded in 1218

== See also ==
- La Merced (disambiguation)
- Mercedes (disambiguation)
