= Huacho =

- City
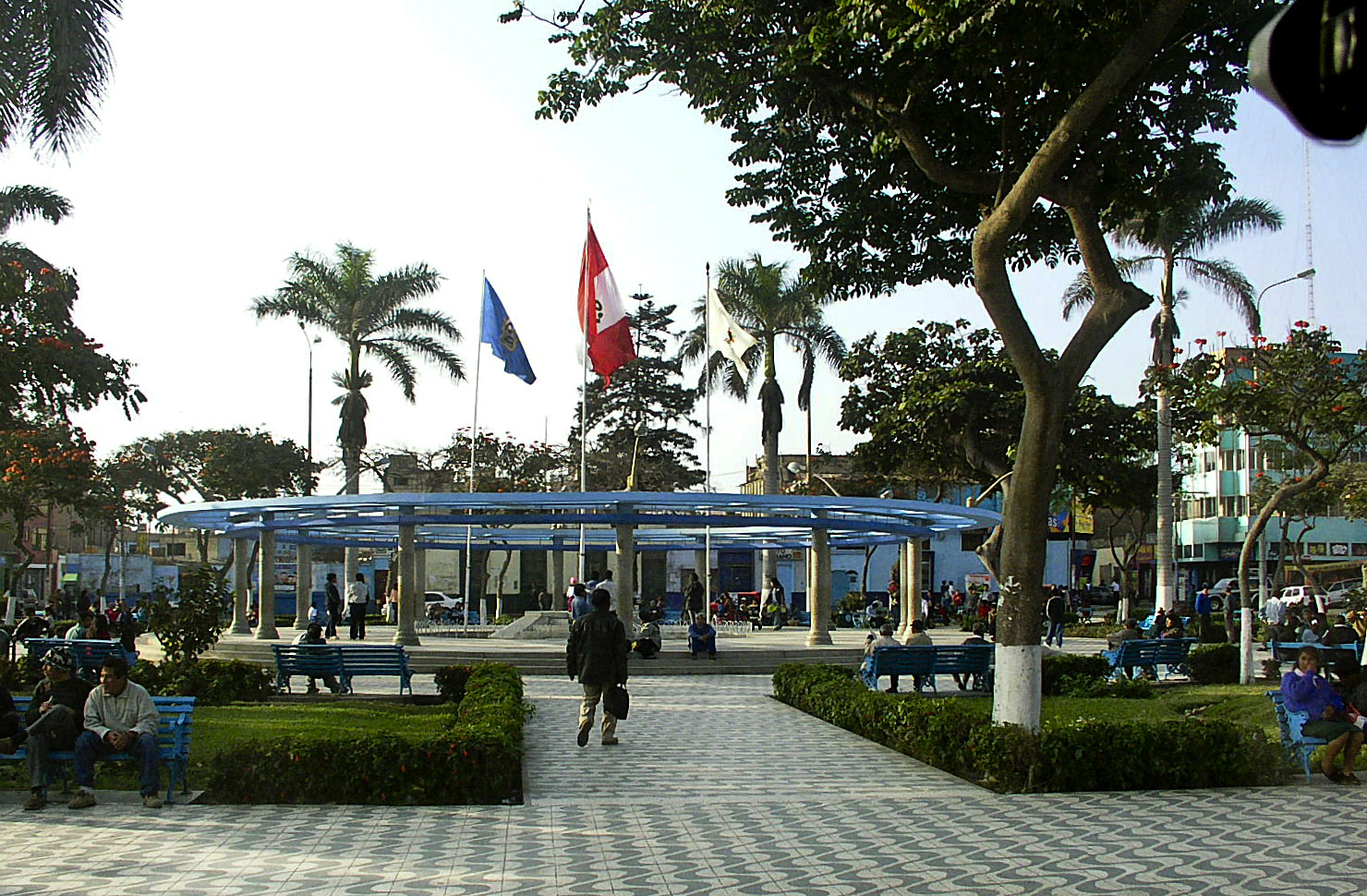
- Clockwise from the top: North side of the Plaza de Armas, Avenida Grau, Balcón de Huaura, Iglecia de Chonta, Avenida San Martin, Avenida 28 de Julio, Casona de Luriama, Malecón Rocca, a well-known shopping center, Malecón Rocca at night and Casino Huacho.

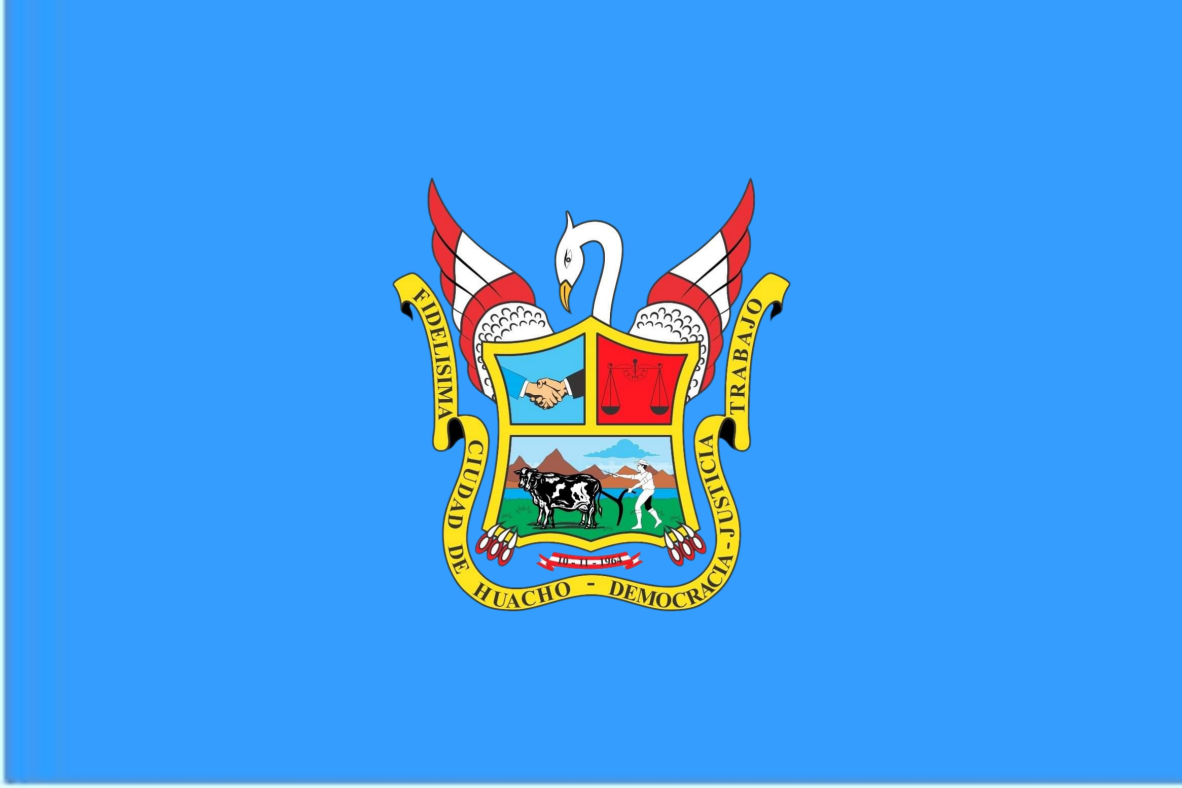
- Flag Coat of arms
- Nickname: La Capital de la Hospitalidad (The Capital of Hospitality)
- Location within Peru
- Coordinates: 11.10667°S 77.605°W
- Country: Peru
- Region: Lima
- Province: Huaura
- District: Huacho
- Founded: 24 August 1571

Government
  - Type: Democracy
  - Mayor: Crispulo Eddie Jara Salazar (2019-2022)
- Elevation: 41 m (135 ft)

Population
  - Estimate (2015): 92,027
- Time zone: UTC-5 (PET)
  - Summer (DST): UTC-5 (PET)
- Area code: 232
- Website: www.gob.pe/munihuaura (in Spanish)

Huacho (Spanish pronunciation: [ˈwatʃo]) is a city in Peru, capital of the Huaura Province and capital of the Lima Region. Also is the most populated city of the Lima Region and Norte Chico. It is located 223 feet (68 metres) above sea level and 148 km north of the city of Lima. The city is located on the Pan-American Highway and it is close to the Lachay National Reserve, so it has extensive vegetation and wildlife.

== Geography ==
Settled on the bottom of a wide bay, its climate is wet and appealing. In the surrounding areas there are rice, cotton, sugarcane and different grain fields. This fact has allowed the rise of a rather important cotton industry, as well as cotton and oil factories. Within its natural landscape, its salt mines and its beaches (such as El Paraíso) are of great interest. Huacho was one of the main trade centers of northern Lima.

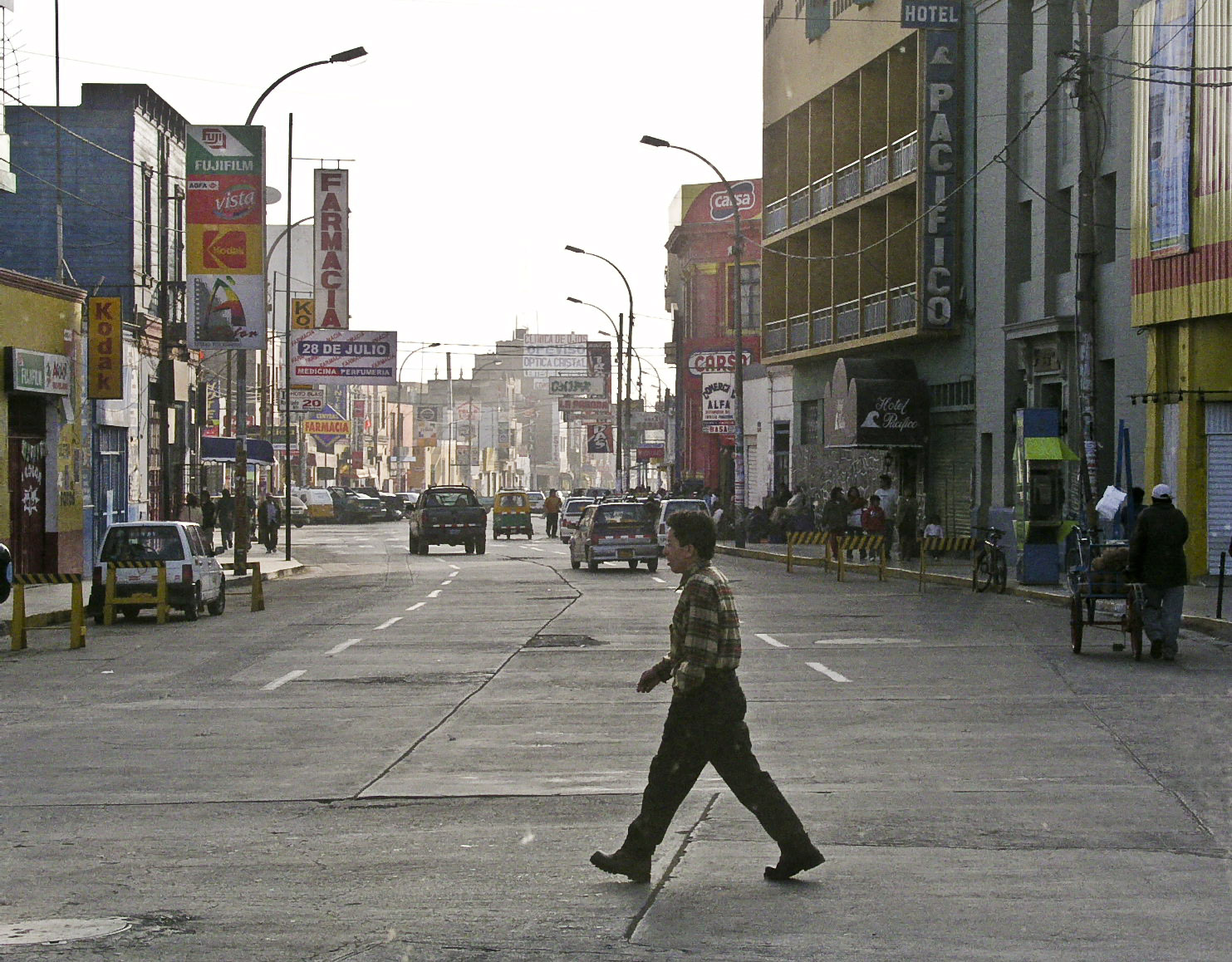
Street view.

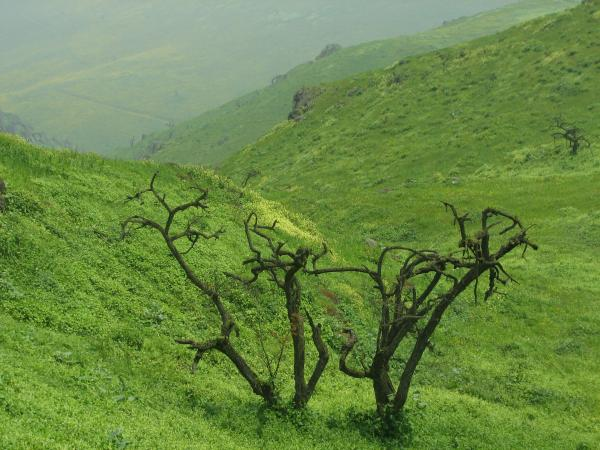
Lomas de Lachay.

== History ==
Under the viceroy of Francisco de Toledo, who decided to group the ayllus of the Indians who were established in that area into reductions. The site chosen was that of "Gaucho Bay." Consequently, on 25 August 1571, the reduction was named San Bartolomé de Guachu.

During the Viceroyalty of Peru, the city belonged to the province of Huara and was established as a trading and fishing port. In 1774 the Viceroy José Antonio de Mendoza granted Huacho the category of "pueblo" and with it, allowed it to build its main plaza.

Huacho was, like Huaura, a pueblo that received and hosted the members of the liberation expedition led by José de San Martín, participating on 26 November 1820 of the Grito libertador en el balcéon de Huaura, on the subject of historical verification.

On 12 February 1821, Huacho was elevated to district, belonging to the province of Chancay, in the department of Lima. The Congress conceded the title of Fidelísima Villa (most faithful) on 11 April 1828, under the presidency of Don José de La Mar. On 24 January 1830, the province of Chancay was unified with the province of Lima and Santa in the department of Ancash. Huaura was established as the capital of the province of Chancay. Thirty years before, on January 23, 1866, Huacho was established as the capital of Chancay.

Due to its technological advances, in 1892, the city began a city tram service, an animal transportation service called "tranvías de sangre" (blood tram), which was said to have used mules or horses. This service extended to Huara, and was electrified in 1920, making Huacho the first city after Lima to have its own electric tram system.

Beginning in 1911, it was the main hub of the Ferrocarril Noroeste del Perú (Northwestern Train of Peru), which connected Huacho with Ancón, Sayan, and Barranca.

On November 10, 1874, Huacho was elevated to the category of city and was made capital of the province even when it was separated from Chancay (today the province of Huaral), and the province of Huaura was created. Next the city of Huacho was also the capital of the Prefecture of Lima, and now is the capital of the Governal Region of Lima.

== Archaeology ==
South of the city of Huacho is located a large archaeological site of Bandurria, Peru. Its history goes back to 4000 BC.

== Culture ==
Huacho is home to the annual Guinea Pig Festival.

Its gastronomy is represented by the Salchicha Huachana.

== Climate ==
Climate data for Huacho (José Faustino Sánchez Carrión National University) (1991–2020 normals)
Month	Jan	Feb	Mar	Apr	May	Jun	Jul	Aug	Sep	Oct	Nov	Dec	Year
Mean daily maximum °C (°F)	27.0 (80.6)	28.2 (82.8)	27.3 (81.1)	25.1 (77.2)	22.9 (73.2)	21.5 (70.7)	20.1 (68.2)	19.5 (67.1)	20.2 (68.4)	21.2 (70.2)	22.8 (73.0)	24.8 (76.6)	23.4 (74.1)
Mean daily minimum °C (°F)	19.9 (67.8)	21.2 (70.2)	20.3 (68.5)	18.5 (65.3)	17.4 (63.3)	16.6 (61.9)	15.7 (60.3)	14.8 (58.6)	15.1 (59.2)	15.5 (59.9)	16.6 (61.9)	18.2 (64.8)	17.5 (63.5)
Average precipitation mm (inches)	0.2 (0.01)	0.8 (0.03)	0.5 (0.02)	0.1 (0.00)	0.1 (0.00)	1.0 (0.04)	1.8 (0.07)	1.2 (0.05)	0.7 (0.03)	0.1 (0.00)	0.1 (0.00)	0.1 (0.00)	6.7 (0.25)
Source: National Meteorology and Hydrology Service of Peru

== Twin towns and sister cities ==
- Wellington, New Zealand
- Lima, Peru
- Tokyo, Japan
- San Isidro, Peru
- El Cairo, Colombia
- Madrid, Spain
- Barcelona, Spain
- Valparaíso, Chile

== Notable people ==
- Mercedes Indacochea (1889-1959), educator
- Jorge Koechlin (born 1950), racing driver
- José de Orejón y Aparicio (1706?-1765), composer and organist
