= Ramón Santamarina (town) =

- Town
- Location within Buenos Aires Province
- Coordinates: 38°26′S 59°20′W
- Country: Argentina
- Province: Buenos Aires
- Partidos: Necochea
- Established: October 2, 1910
- Elevation: 57 m (187 ft)

Population (2001 Census)
  - Total: 473
- Time zone: UTC−3 (ART)
- CPA Base: B 7641
- Climate: Dfc

Ramón Santamarina is a town located in the Necochea Partido in the province of Buenos Aires, Argentina.

== History ==
Ramón Santamarina was founded on October 2, 1910, consisting of several homes and service buildings, including a hotel. The town received its name from a businessman of the same name who owned the land that made up the town until his death in 1904, alongside large amounts of land across Argentina, totaling nearly 300,000 hectares. His children contributed to the town's founding.

The town peaked in population and importance in the 1940s before entering into a rapid decline beginning roughly 20 years later. The town's decline was so severe that the Argentine government began an unsuccessful program to incentivize families to return to the region, including through offering housing loans.

== Population ==
The population of the town peaked at around 2,200 residents in the 1940s, however the modern population is only a fraction of that. According to INDEC, which collects population data for the country, the town had a population of 473 people as of the 2001 census.
