= José de Orejón y Aparicio =

Peruvian composer (c.1706–1765)

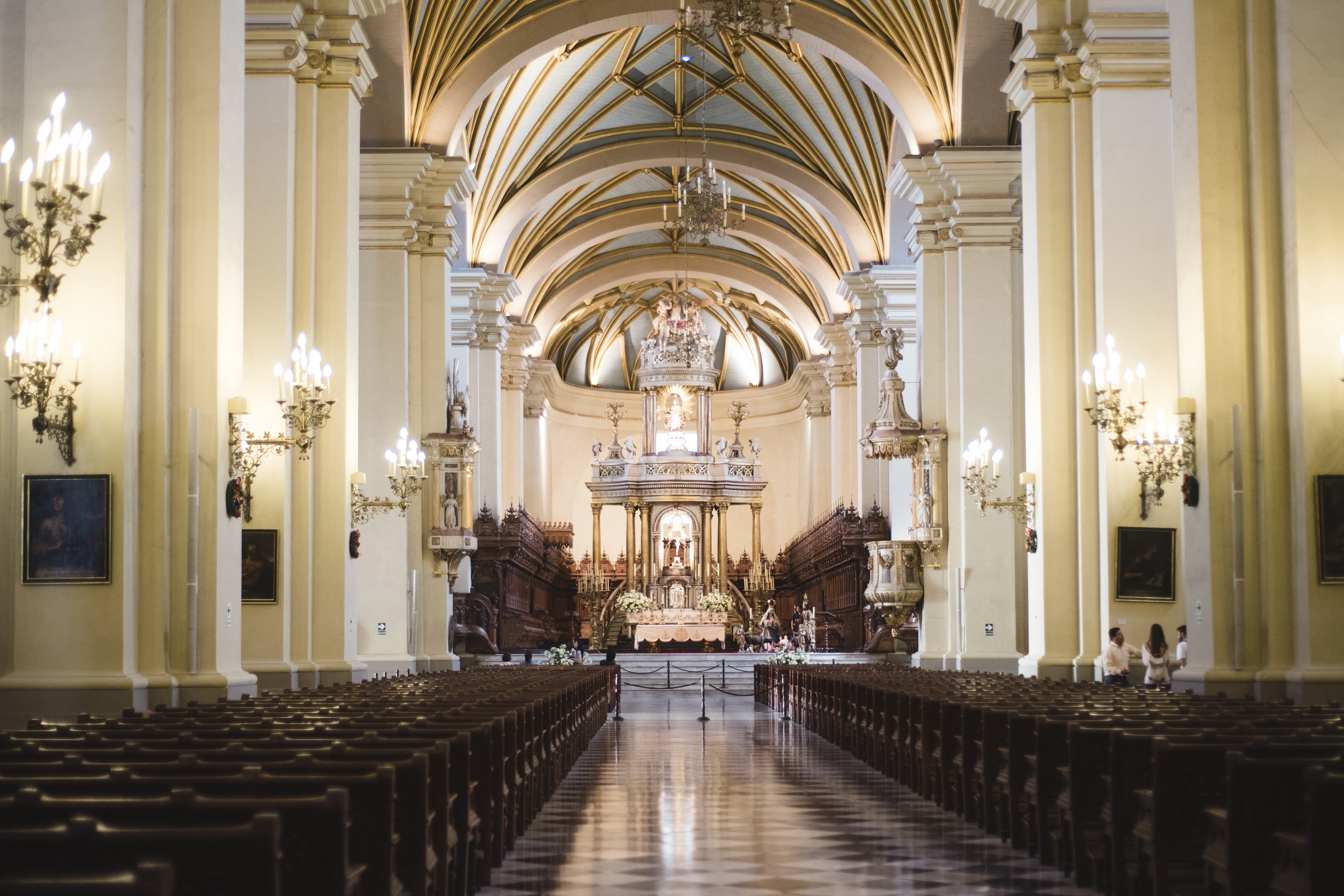
The nave of Lima Cathedral.

José de Orejón y Aparicio (Huacho 1706?-Lima, May 1765), was a Peruvian composer. He was organist at Lima Cathedral. He is considered the main composer of the Peruvian Baroque. He was born to Esteban de Orejón and Victoria de Aparicio. He studied in Lima, first with Tomás de Torrejón y Velasco, and then with Roque Ceruti, a Milanese composer brought to Lima by Viceroy Manuel de Oms y Santa Pau. Ceruti was one of the main people responsible for introducing the Italian musical style of the Late Baroque to the viceroyalty. Orejón was also an organist.

Very little is known about the biography of Orejón. He was ordained as a priest and spent the majority of his life in Lima, Peru. Notably, he became the first musician of mixed heritage to serve as the chapelmaster of the Lima Cathedral, a highly esteemed position. Orejón died in Lima on May 7, 1765.

== Recordings ==
- "Ya que el sol misterioso", Valentina Alvarez (soprano) Urtext Records
- Ah, de la esfera de Apolo : "Ah, de la esfera de Apolo", A del Día, Our Lady of Copacabana Jilguerillo sonoro Tocatta - Al post Comunio Xácara - Según veo el Aparato Dolores y Gozos de San Joseph: Chacona - Giga Musica Temprana. Cobra Records 2017
