= De la Merced =

De la Merced (Spanish for: Of the Mercy) may refer to:

== Things ==
- Rancho Laguna de la Merced, Mexican land grant
- Convento de la Merced, the Church of San Pedro
- Nuestra Señora de la Merced y San Judas Tadeo, Montevideo
- Basilica of Nuestra Señora de la Merced (Lima)
- Basílica de Nuestra Señora de la Merced (Quito)

== People ==
- Mosco de la Merced I (born 1977), Mexican luchador or professional wrestler
- Mosco de la Merced II (born 1964), Mexican luchador
- José de Elduayen, 1st Marquis of the Pazo de la Merced (1823–1898)

== See also ==
- La Merced (disambiguation)
- Merced, California
