= Mercedes Santamarina =

Argentine art collector (1896–1972)

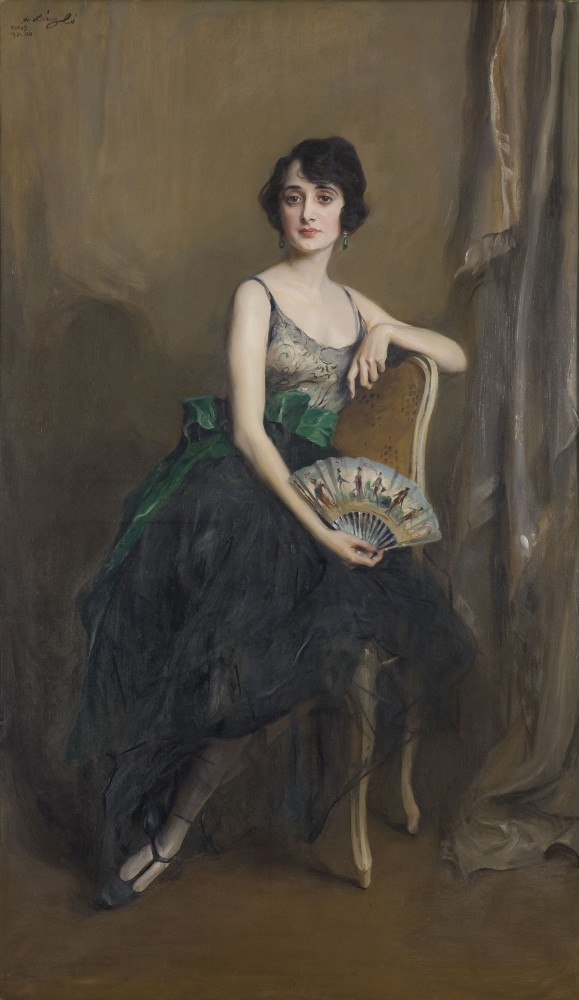
Santamarina as painted by Philip de László in 1921

Mercedes Santamarina Gastañaga (18 June 1896 – 23 May 1972) was an Argentine art collector and patron. Interested in art from an early age, Santamarina amassed a large collection of pieces over the course of her life. In her last few years she donated much of her collection to the Museo Nacional de Bellas Artes in Buenos Aires and the Museo Municipal de Bellas Artes Tandil in Tandil.

== Biography ==
Mercedes Santamarina was born on 18 June 1896 in Buenos Aires into an aristocratic family of Spanish origins. Her parents were Ramón Santamarina II and María Gaztañaga and she was the sixth of ten children. Santamarina was a granddaughter of the businessman Ramon Santamarina, who is considered the family's founder. The Santamarina family owned La Pola, a large estancia (private plot of land) in Tandil in the Buenos Aires Province. Since Santamarina's father's business was also based in Tandil, she spent much of her childhood there.

Upon her father's death in 1909, Santamarina inherited La Pola. As an adult she mostly lived in Buenos Aires though typically spent the summers in Tandil. Santamarina developed an interest in art already as a child and devoted her life to collecting artwork. She acquired much of her collection in Paris, a city she frequently travelled to and sometimes resided in. She made her first trip to Paris before the outbreak of World War I. Santamarina's collection of paintings contained several important and historically significant works, mainly 19th-century French paintings by artists such as Jean-Baptiste-Camille Corot, Jean-Louis Forain, Édouard Manet, Claude Monet, Pierre-Auguste Renoir, Auguste Rodin, Alfred Sisley, Henri de Toulouse-Lautrec and Félix Ziem.

A large amount of artwork and fine items were auctioned off by Santamarina in 1946. Since this was the same year her mother died, many of the pieces sold had likely been her mother's property. Santamarina died in Buenos Aires on 23 May 1972, aged 75.

== Legacy ==
Santamarina died unmarried and childless. In her will, she granted La Pola to her nephew Jorge de Alvear Santamarina.

Towards the end of her life, Santamarina donated large parts of her still large collection of paintings, sculptures and furniture. In 1970, she donated much of her collection of paintings to the Museo Nacional de Bellas Artes in Buenos Aires and in 1971 she donated almost a hundred different pieces to the Museo Municipal de Bellas Artes Tandil in Tandil. The collection in Tandil is considered an important part of the city's cultural legacy. Her collection in the Museo Nacional de Bellas Artes occupies rooms 18 and 19 of the museum and was donated with the only stipulation that the collection had to be displayed together. The collection in Tandil was originally also intended to occupy two rooms but the final installation was instead put up in a single room in 1973. A large part of the collection in Buenos Aires was stolen in 1980 and a further theft (though this time of only two prints) also occurred in 1997.
