= Pedro de Moya =

Spanish painter

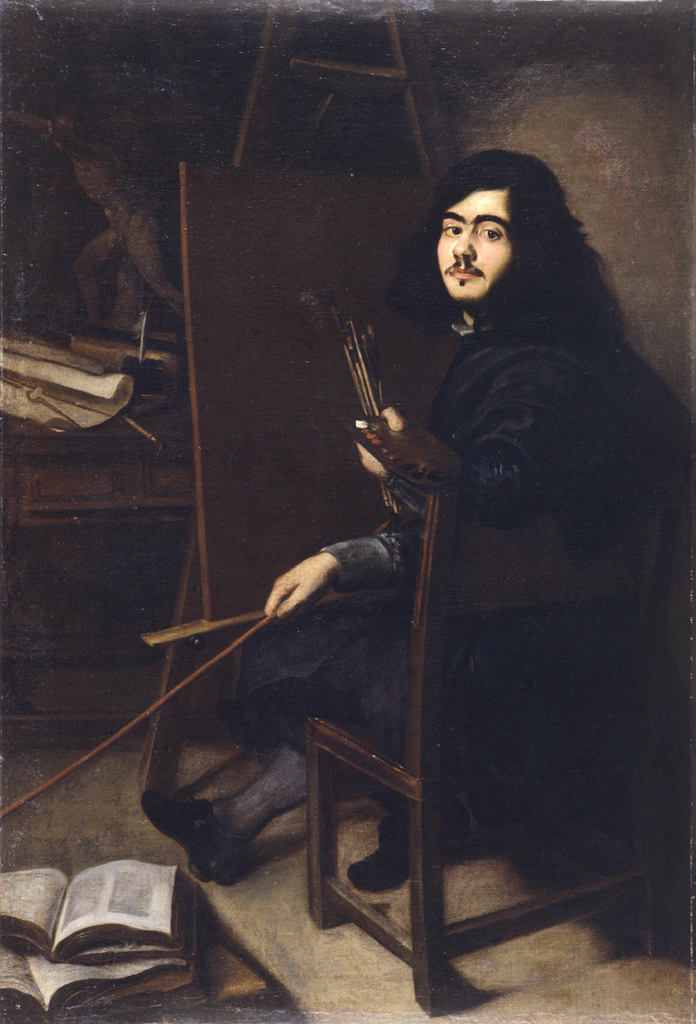
Pedro de Moya (self-portrait)

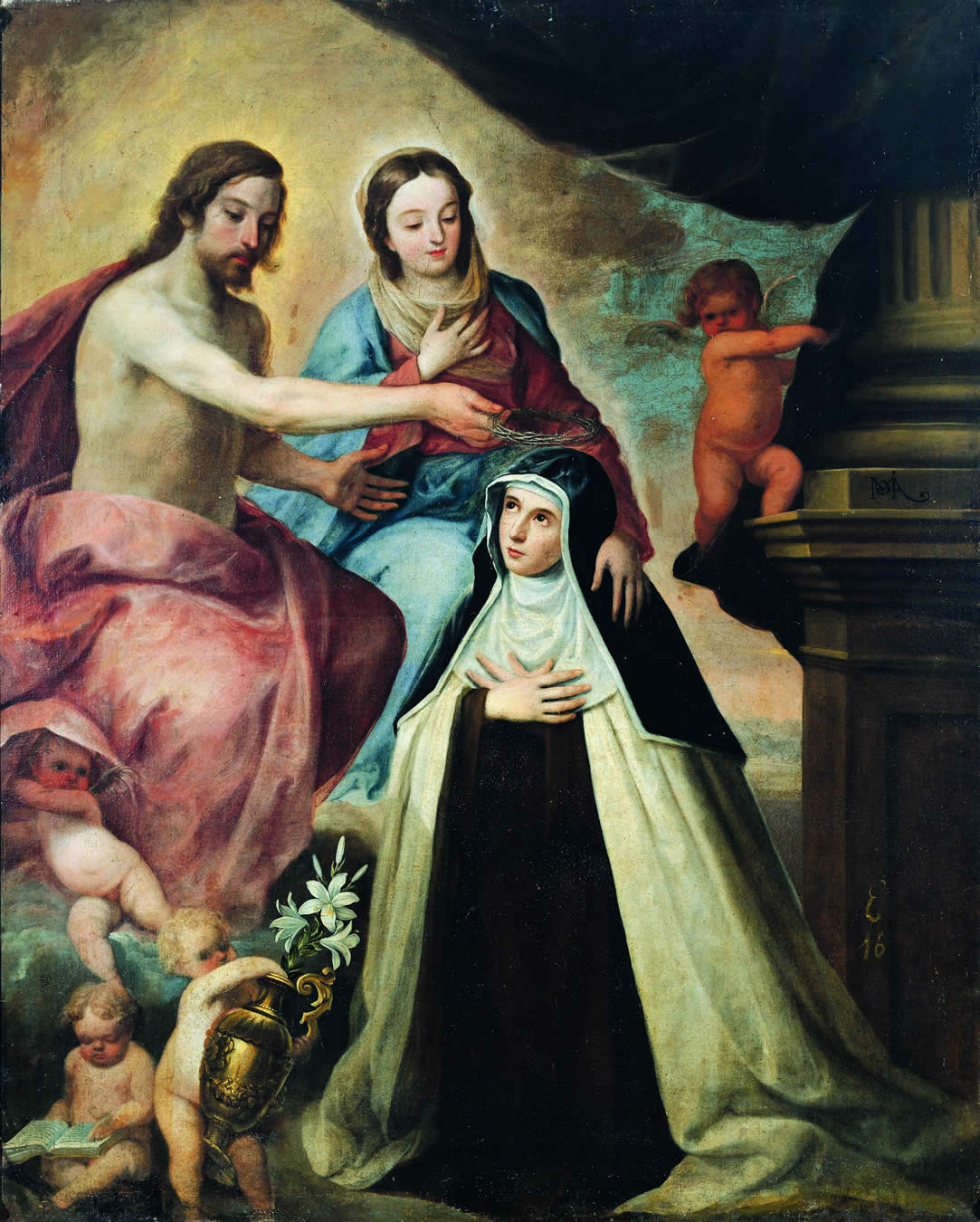
Vision of Santa Maria Magdalena de Pazzis Oil on linen

Pedro de Moya (1610–1660) was a Spanish painter of the Baroque period.

Born in Granada, he was first trained under Juan del Castillo in Seville. He enlisted as a soldier for the armies in Flanders. Upon his discharge in 1641, he traveled to London. From there he returned to Seville and Granada. He painted mostly religious paintings. His works included the Vision of Santa Maria Magdalena de Pazzis, painted on oil on linen.
