= Mercedes Indacochea =

Peruvian academic (1889–1959)

Mercedes Indacochea Lozano (24 October 1889 – 24 February 1959) was a Peruvian academic. Her teaching career included different levels from primary grades to higher education. In 1956, the Peruvian government awarded her the Palmas Magisteriales. She is particularly remembered in Tacna, where she founded a Women's Normal School, and served as director of the National Women's College. Various schools in Barranco District, Tacna, Huacho, and Huaraz are named in her honor.

== Early life and education ==
Mercedes Indacochea Lozano was born in Huacho, October 24, 1889. She was the daughter of Manuel B. Indacochea, a native of Arequipa who worked in the pharmaceutical industry; and Sofía Lozano, a native of Lima. She was the fourth of seven children.

Indacochea Lozano began her education at a private school in Huacho. After the death of her father, she moved to Lima, where she finished her studies, being fifteen years old when she obtained the title of second-degree auxiliary teacher. She then attended and graduated from the Normal School of San Pedro as a preceptor.

== Career ==
After working in various schools in Lima, she was appointed director of the Huancayo Mixed Normal School on May 4, 1923.

In 1930, she was commissioned by the Chilean Ministry of Education to visit the main schools and high schools in that country. Back in Peru in 1933, she returned to Tacna, which had just regained its Peruvian governance after 50 years under Chilean control. There, she founded a Normal School for Women, the first one of that city. Although the classes were at elementary grade level, the school was of great value to the Tacneña women. It was attached to the National College of Women, later renamed in honor of as Francisco Antonio de Zela.

In 1941, she was appointed a member of the National Council of Education, and as such, was sent to Bolivia with the mission of studying the organization of the normal schools of that country. In 1949, she returned to Tacna, where she served as director of the National Women's College, a position she held until 1953, when she definitively moved away from that city. She returned to Lima, where she assumed the position of director of Colegio Nacional de Mujeres Elvira García y García. In 1956, she removed to the Gran Unidad Escolar Teresa González de Fanning, also a women's school, which she directed until her death in 1959.

The Peruvian government considered her educational work to be an outstanding example, and in July 1956, she was awarded the Palmas Magisteriales, the highest award granted to a Peruvian teacher. She died in Lima, 24 February 1959.

== Awards and honors ==
- 1956, Palmas Magisteriales
