= Santa Marina (Córdoba) =

Church in Córdoba, Spain

Coordinates: 37°53′23″N 4°46′29″W

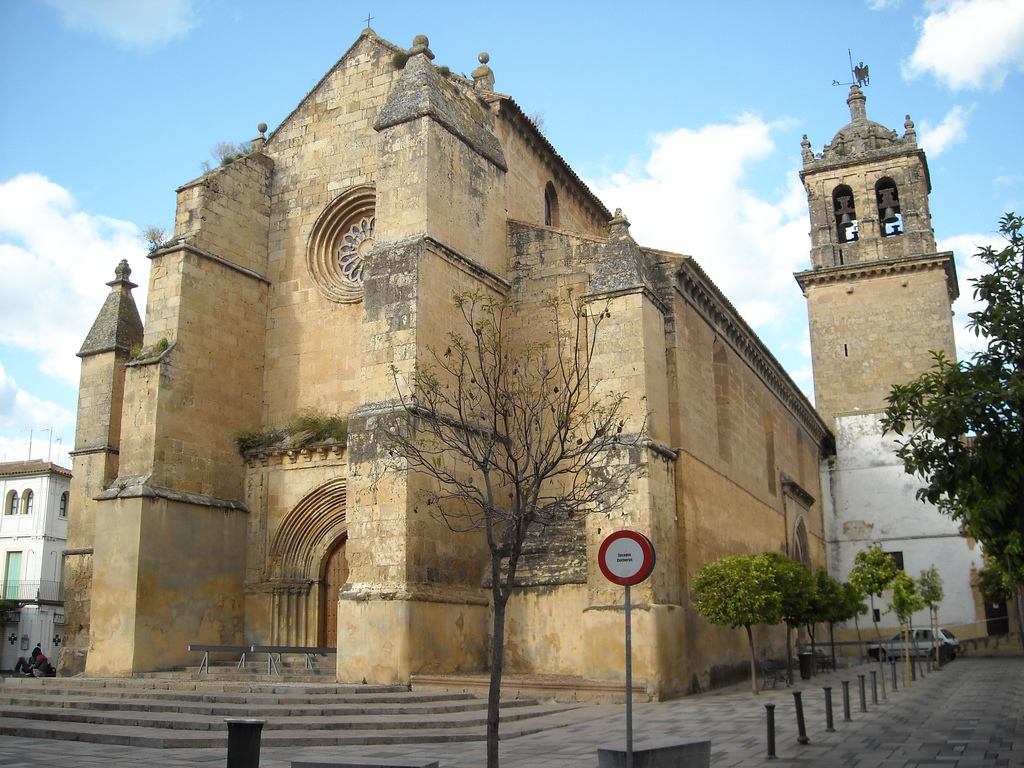
Santa Marina

Santa Marina is a church in Córdoba, Spain. It is one of the so-called "Fernandinean Churches," built in Córdoba after Ferdinand III of Castile conquered the city in 1236 CE. The structure combines proto-Gothic, Mudéjar and, to a lesser degree, late-Romanesque elements.

== History ==
The church, one of the oldest of the Fernandinean group, was built in the second half of the 13th century on the site of what had previously been a mosque and before that a 7th-century Visigothic church. No trace of these remains today.

On 23 June 1880, the church was damaged in a fire, which required a restoration project that lasted two years. Other renovations were carried out in the 19th and 20th centuries; as part of these, the medieval appearance of the building was restored by the removal of the Baroque additions introduced as part of the repairs that followed the 1680 and 1755 earthquakes.

The church has been a national monument since 1931.

== Overview ==
The church has a rectangular, basilica plan, divided into a nave and two aisles, the nave being far higher than the latter. The aisles are separated from the nave by large pointed arches.

The facade is characterized by four large, asymmetrical buttresses, ending with pinnacles, and corresponding to the interior separation between nave and aisles. Also present are a main central rose window, smaller circular windows, and alfizes over the ogival arch of the main portal. The facade corresponding to the left aisle features a secondary portal, surmounted by a triangular arch.

The apses are polygonal. In the right aisle is the sacristy, built in the 15th century. The left aisle apse was adapted to house a Baroque chapel from 1630. The bell tower dates to the 16th century.

The "retablo" of the Main Chapel houses paintings by Antonio del Castillo and sculptures from the local artist Gómez de Sandoval.

== Gallery ==
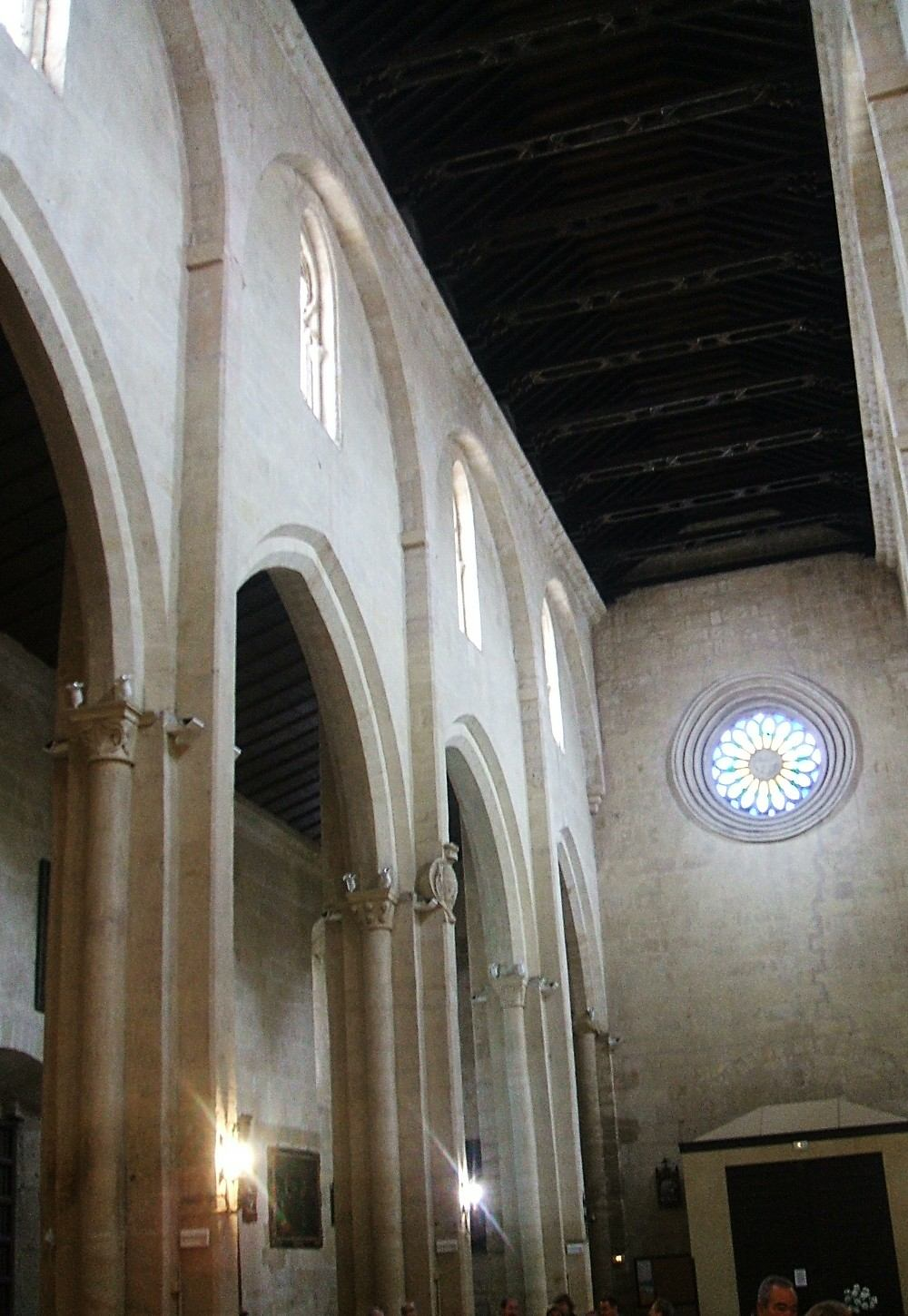
Central nave and side arches

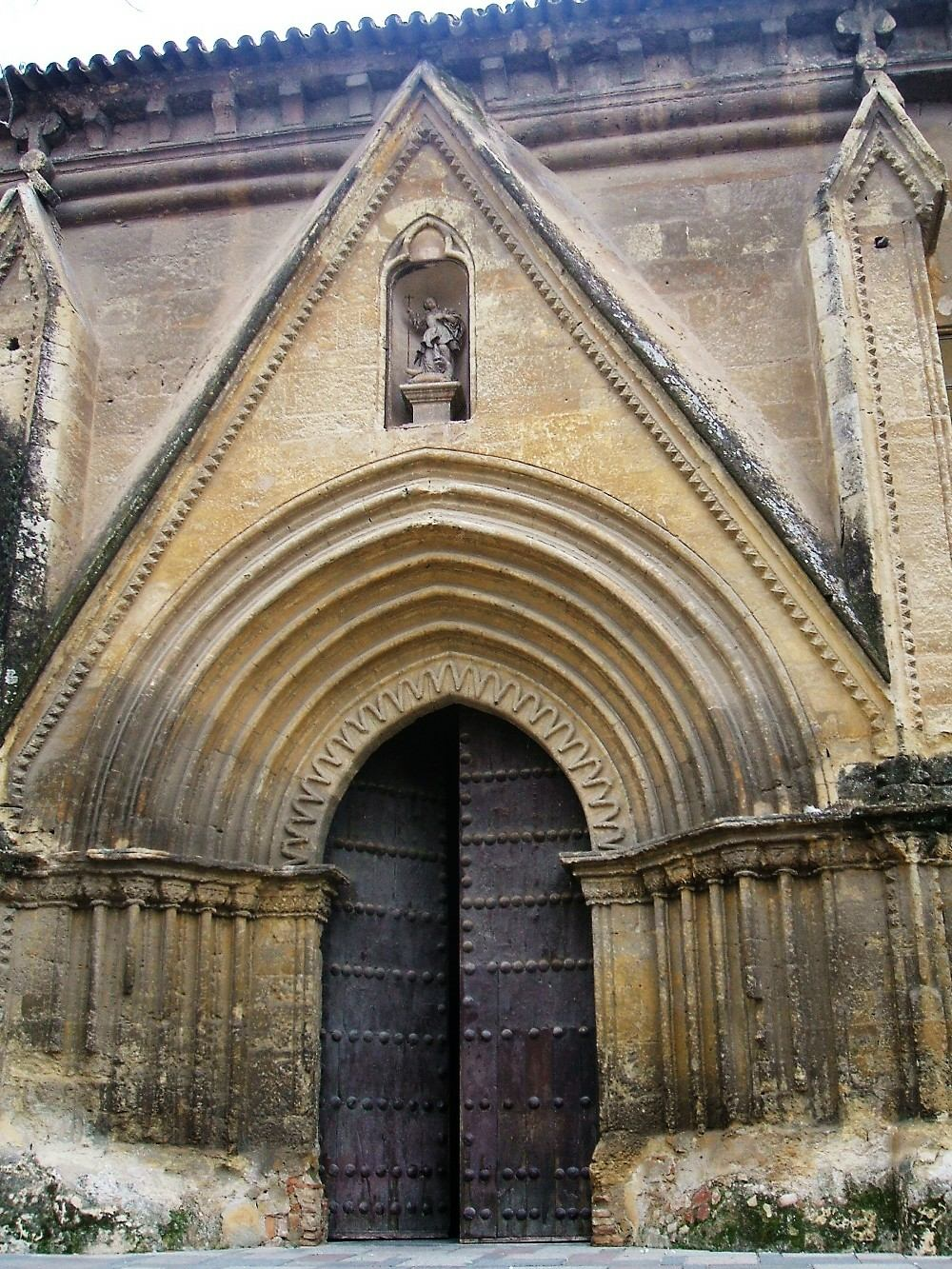
Entrance of the Evangelio vault

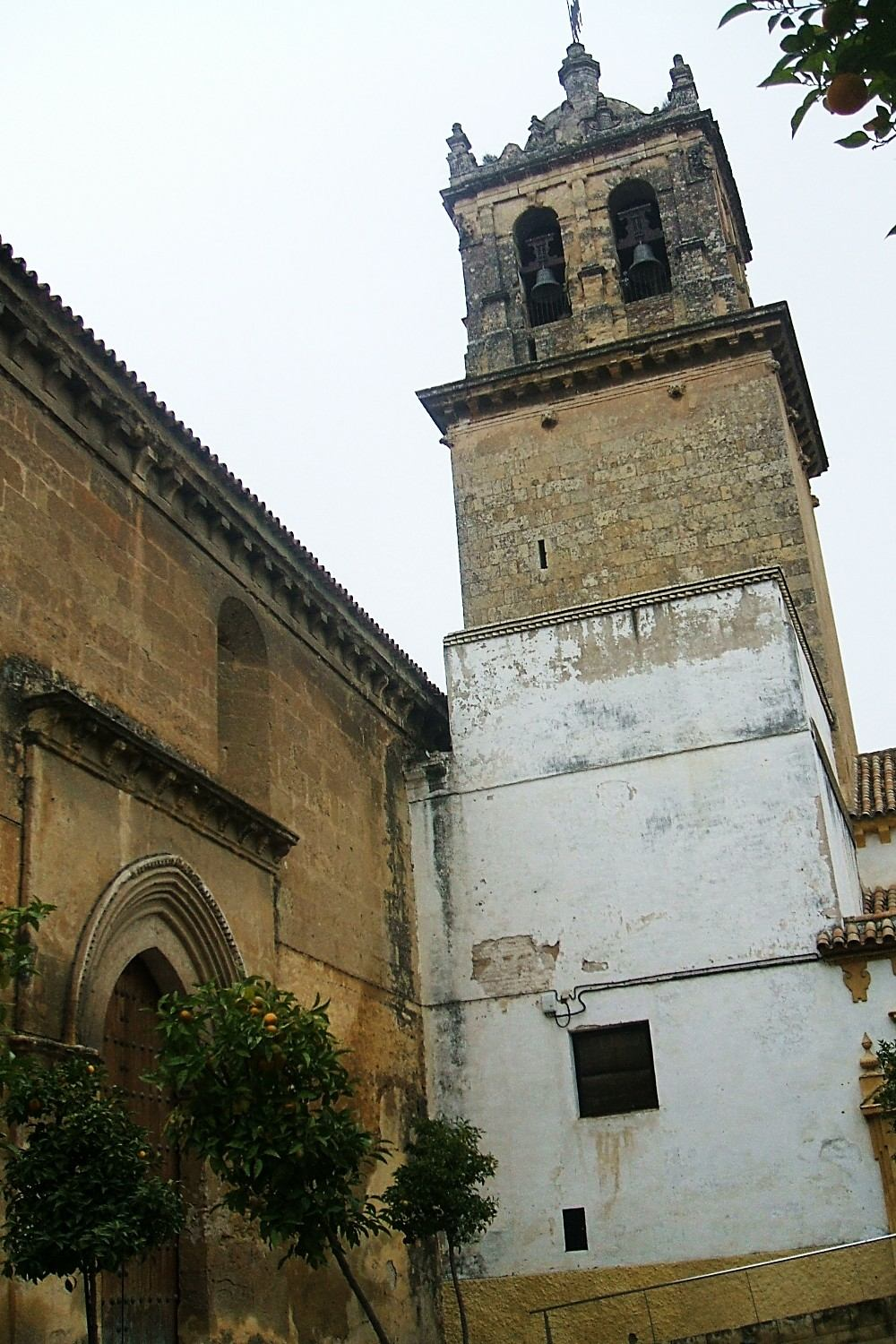
Tower

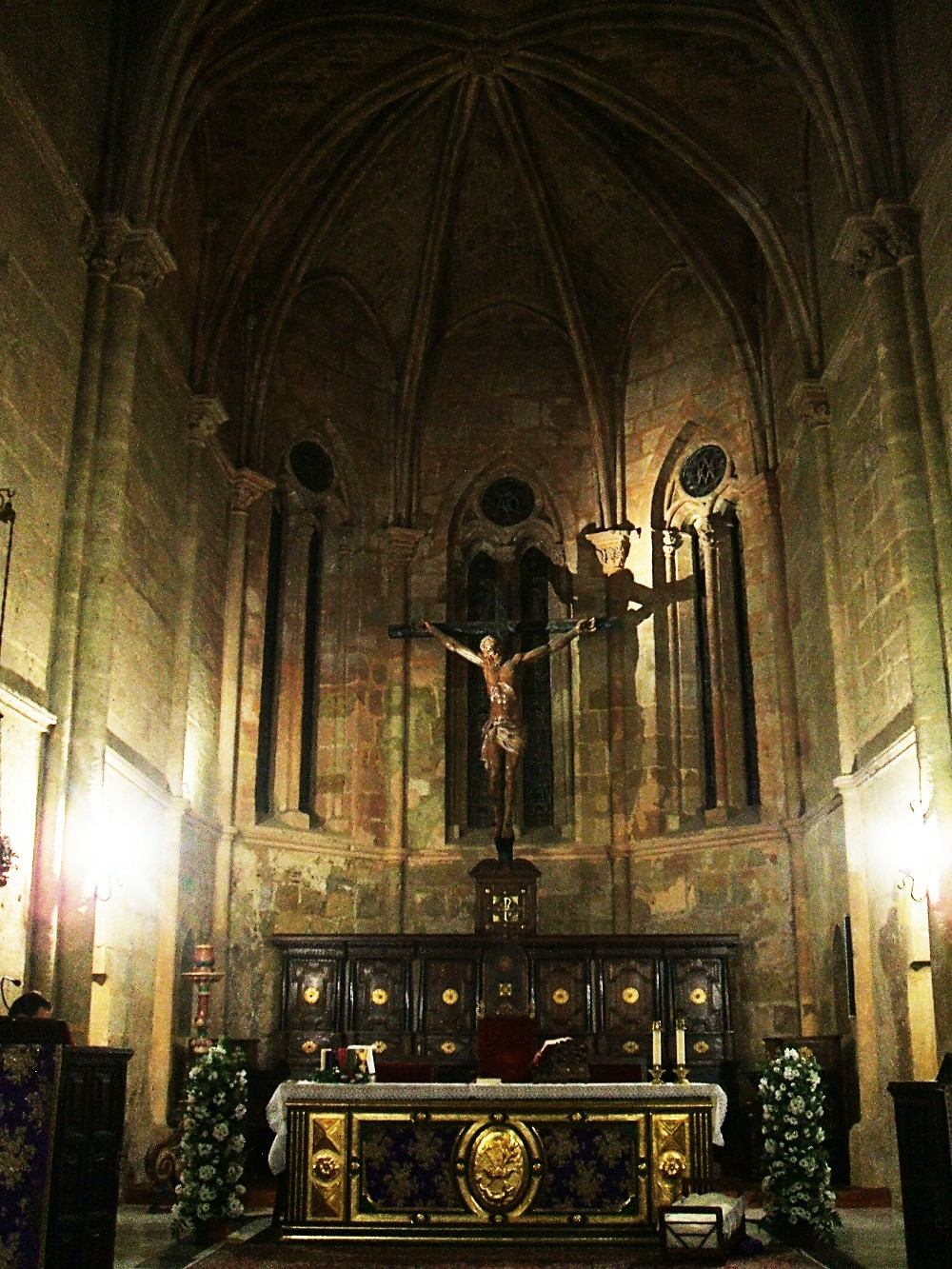
Main chapel and apse

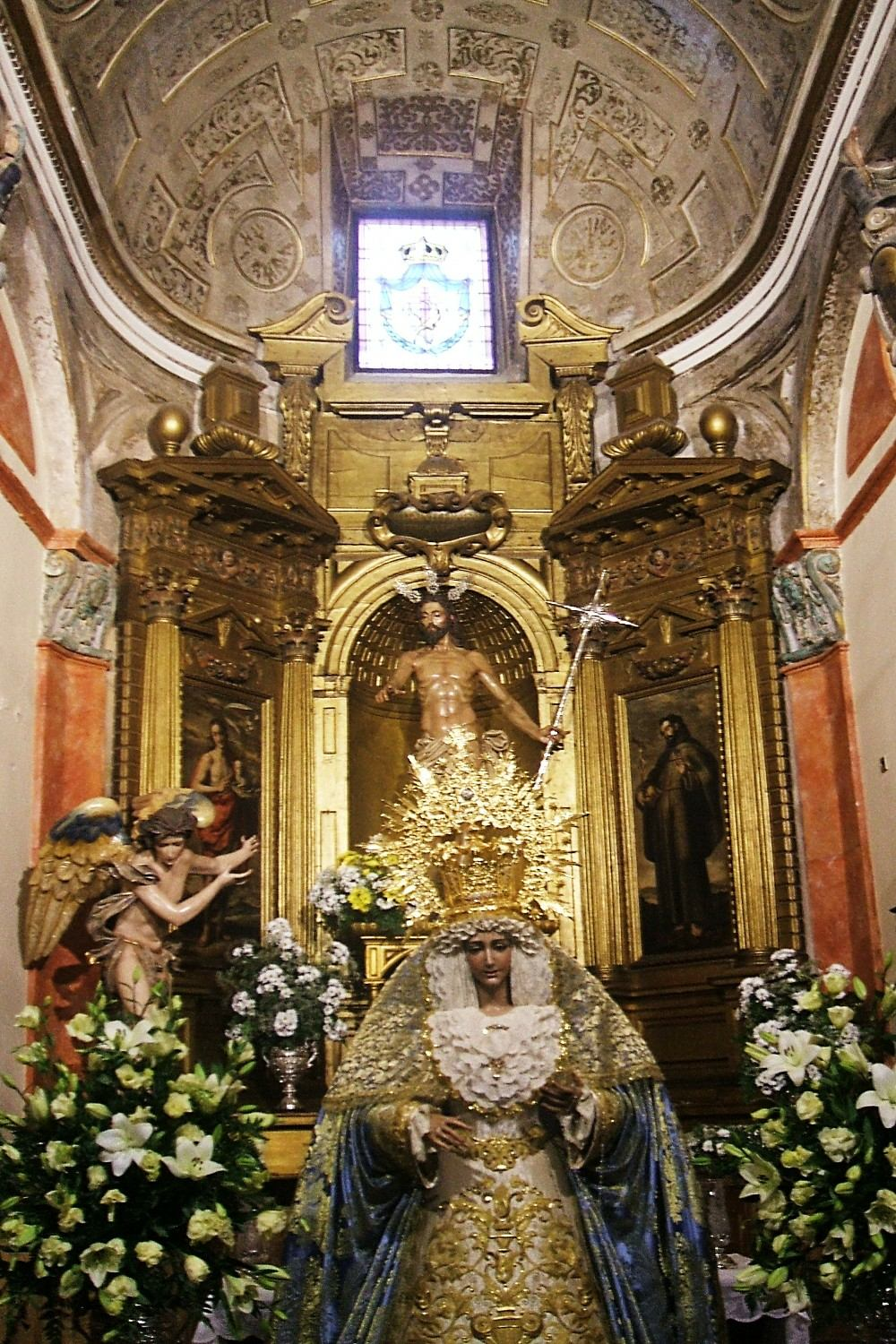

== Sources ==
- Perez Cano, María del Mar (1998). Estudio histórico-artístico de la Iglesia Parroquial de San Marina de Aguas Santas de Córdoba. Córdoba: Universidad de Córdoba and Cajasur.
