= Saint Marina =

Saint Marina may refer to:

- Marina of Aguas Santas (c. 120–135/139), Spanish virgin martyr
- Marina the Martyr of Antioch (c. 289 – c. 304), also known as Margaret the Virgin in the west
- Marina the Monk (fl. 5th century), Byzantine monastic, confessor and wonderworker
- Marina de Escobar (1554–1633), Spanish Catholic mystic
- Marina of Omura (died 1634), Dominican tertiary and one of the 16 Martyrs of Japan

== See also ==
- Santa Marina (disambiguation)
