= David Consuegra =

Colombian artist (1939–2004)

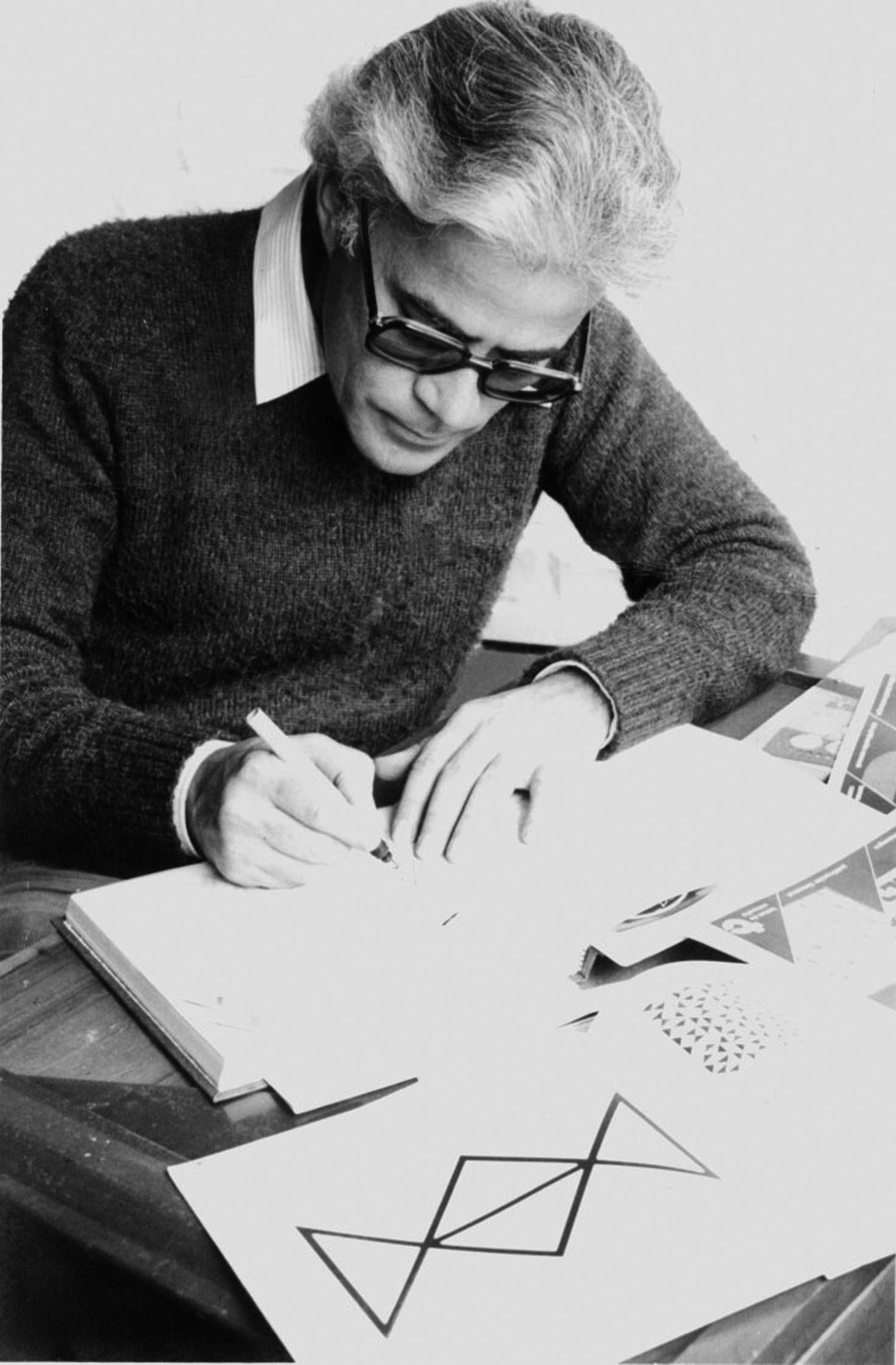
- David Consugra. Museum of Modern Art, Bogota
- Born: 1939; Bucaramanga, Colombia
- Died: October 30, 2004 (aged 64); Mexico City
- Occupation(s): Graphic Designer, Illustrator

David Consuegra Uribe (1939–2004) was a Colombian graphic designer and illustrator. He created dozens of logos for Colombian institutions, such as Inravisión, the Colombian Liberal Party, and the Bogotá Museum of Modern Art. He was also a visiting professor at Virginia Commonwealth University and the University of Barcelona.

== Early life and education ==
David was born in Bucaramanga. He traveled to the United States at sixteen to study fine arts at Boston University, graduating cum laude in 1961. Afterwards, he graduated from Yale University in 1963 and won an award for his thesis, "On Trademarks". He also worked with Paul Rand at his New York studio.

== Career ==
Inravisión logo designed by Consuegra

David returned to Colombia in 1963. There he taught as a professor at Universidad de los Andes and Universidad Nacional. In 1964, the Bogotá Museum of Modern Art hired him as a graphic designer, where he would go on to design their logo. He founded Colombia's first graphic design program at Universidad Jorge Tadeo Lozano in 1967.

His career continued to balance graphic design and teaching. He participated in Universidad Nacional's advertising design contests in 1966, 1977, and 1982. Universidad Nacional designated him professor emeritus in 1990. He was a visiting professor at Virginia Commonwealth University in 1984, and University of Barcelona in 1998. In 1994, he joined Belgium's International Trademark Center. Among his works is the one carried out in 1990, for the San Carlos Hotel, characterized by a clean and simple design.

Logos designed by Consuegra include the Museum of Modern Art of Bogotá, Inravisión, Artesanías de Colombia, the Industrial University of Santander, and the Federation of Rice Growers.

Consuegra won a design contest hosted by Colombia's National Tourism Corporation. He designed a spiral of yellow, blue and red, which he presented under the name El sol de Colombia por el mundo. Consuegra also represented Latin America at the World Logo Design Biennial in Brussels, Belgium. He held his last exhibition, "Comics", in April 1994 at the National University.

Consuegra died of a heart attack in Mexico City in October 2004 while participating as a judge in a poster contest.

== Published works ==
He was the author of numerous books, including a history of art and a treatise on typography. In 1964 he founded the magazine Nova. Four years later in 1968 he founded the magazine Acteón. He also published a translation and edit of Rudolf Koch's The Book of Signs.

=== Bibliography ===
- The Twenty-Six Letters (1964)
- In Search of the Square (1992)
- Classic Typefaces
- On Trademarks (1971)
- Theory & Practice of Graphic Design (1982–1986, series of 7 issues)
- ABC of World Trademarks (1988)
- American Type Design & Designers (2004)
