= Maria Mercedes Ortoll =

Spanish Writer

María Mercedes Ortoll
- Born: Canary Islands, Spain
- Occupation: Author
- Writing career
- Years active: 1930–1963

Maria Mercedes Ortoll (born in the Canary Islands) was a popular Spanish author of more than 70 romance novels between 1930 and 1963.

== Biography ==
María de las Mercedes Ortol Wintero was born in the Canary Islands of Spain. She married the painter and soldier Antonio Galindo Casalas (d. 1992), who accompanied her to all her destinations in Ceuta, Gran Canaria or Cáceres. In 1966 she was named a member of the Cultural and Social Academy of Paris.

== Bibliography ==
=== Novels ===
- Debt of Honor (1930)
- Rescued by Love (1930)
- The Girl's Ambitions (1931)
- He and She (1931)
- Proud Hearts (1932)
- Destinies of the Heart (1932)
- A Lifetime (1932)
- The Gates of Happiness (1933)
- Blasts from the Past (1933)
- Misfortune (1934)
- Domestic Tragedies (1934)
- Aunt's Legacy (1935)
- Girl (1935)
- Canarian nostalgia (1935)
- Down the Same Road (1935)
- How Love Triumphs (1936)
- Between love and fortune (1936)
- Generous Souls (1937)
- Opposite Lives (1937)
- Slaves of the Big World (1938)
- Golden Youth (1939)
- In Search of Illusion (1940)
- New Horizons (1940)
- The house of the Guzmanes (1941)
- She is like that! (1942)
- Love Bet (1942)
- Orphans Asylum (1942)
- Lectureship in Summer (1942)
- Family Environment (1943)
- That Kiss (1943)
- Wretched for Pretty (1943)
- Mannequin (1943)
- Pitsi (1943)
- Chain of Surprises (1945)
- America's Sweetheart (1945)
- Catherine's Secret (1946)
- Mandate of Destiny (1946)
- Background (1946)
- Hasty Trance (1947)
- Manila Miranda (1948)
- Silver Castle (1949)
- The Jolly Bohemian (1949)
- To the Other Side (1949)
- An Important Woman (1949)
- Love Is Not a Business (1950)
- Kavana Island (1950)
- Playing Millionaire (1950)
- Veronica (1950)
- Snowy Summit (1951)
- Impassable Barrier (1952)
- I'll Be There Tomorrow (1952)
- Third Illusion (1952)
- The Man of His Destiny (1953)
- The Sin of Lida Verona (1953)
- Wrong Ways (1953)
- I Love You So (1954)
- Good People (1954)
- Dear Earth (1954)
- Ace of Clubs (1955)
- Nightmare (1955)
- Dina Maris (1956)
- Omen (1956)
- A World in Hell (1956)
- We're Coming Home (1956)
- An Ember Left (1957)
- A Secret in Every Life (1957)
- Look what happens! (1958)
- Adriana (1958)
- She Wasn't Elisa (1958)
- Always Dawn Again (1958)
- I'll Always Be With You (1959)
- One Man's Story (1959)
- They're All Gone (1961)
- Letters from the Sahara (1963)
