= Mercedes Formation =

Mercedes Formation may refer to:

- Mercedes Formation, Uruguay, Late Cretaceous geologic formation of Uruguay
- Mercedes Formation, Colombia, Cretaceous geologic formation of Colombia which is time equivalent with the Macanal Formation
