= Mercedes Valdés Consuegra =

Cuban independence fighter (1834–1934)

- Born: September 11, 1834; Santa Clara, Cuba
- Died: July 17, 1934 (aged 99); Santa Clara, Cuba
- Known for: Independence activism
- Honours: Grand Cross of Merit Carlos Manuel de Céspedes

María de las Mercedes Valdés Consuegra (Note: In this Hispanic American name, the first or paternal surname is Valdés and the second or maternal family name is Consuegra.) (September 11, 1834 – July 17, 1934) was a Cuban independence fighter who is famous for having embroidered the flag on which the Constitution of 1869 was sworn.

== Biography ==
Mercedes Valdés Consuegra was born into a distinguished family from Villa Clara; her parents were the illustrious physician Don José Marto Valdés, brother of the famous Havana writer Don José Ramón Valdés, and Doña Rafaela Consuegra y López Silvero. She was educated at the school of the teacher Nicolasa (Nicolasa Pedraza y Bonachea) in Santa Clara.

She was part of the Revolutionary Board and conspired with Eduardo Machado Gómez and Miguel Jerónimo Gutiérrez. Under the direction of Eduardo Machado Gómez, she embroidered the flag of Narciso López that Eduardo Machado Gómez and his troops carried when the revolution broke out in Las Villas on February 7, 1869, supporting the "Cry of Yara" by Carlos Manuel de Céspedes. On this flag, the Constitution was sworn in on April 10, 1869, in Guáimaro.

She was imprisoned in 1870 along with other women from Villa Clara and the priest Don Luciano Santana at the Hermitage of Our Lady of Carmen, which served as a prison for women who conspired against Spain. The confinement was decreed by the governor, General Manuel Portillo. Three months later, her deportation to Santa María del Rosario was ordered, along with Martina Lorda Mendoza. Five years later, she returned to Villa Clara and was pardoned by Captain General Blas Villate y de las Heras, Count of Valmaseda.

During the months of the Little War, she was imprisoned in the city of Santa Clara. In the last War of Independence, she helped Rafael Lubian y Rodríguez, being imprisoned again by Trujillo Monaga and later released.

She received the Carlos Manuel de Céspedes Cross of Merit awarded by the Secretary of State.
