= Luis Fernández (painter) =

Spanish painter

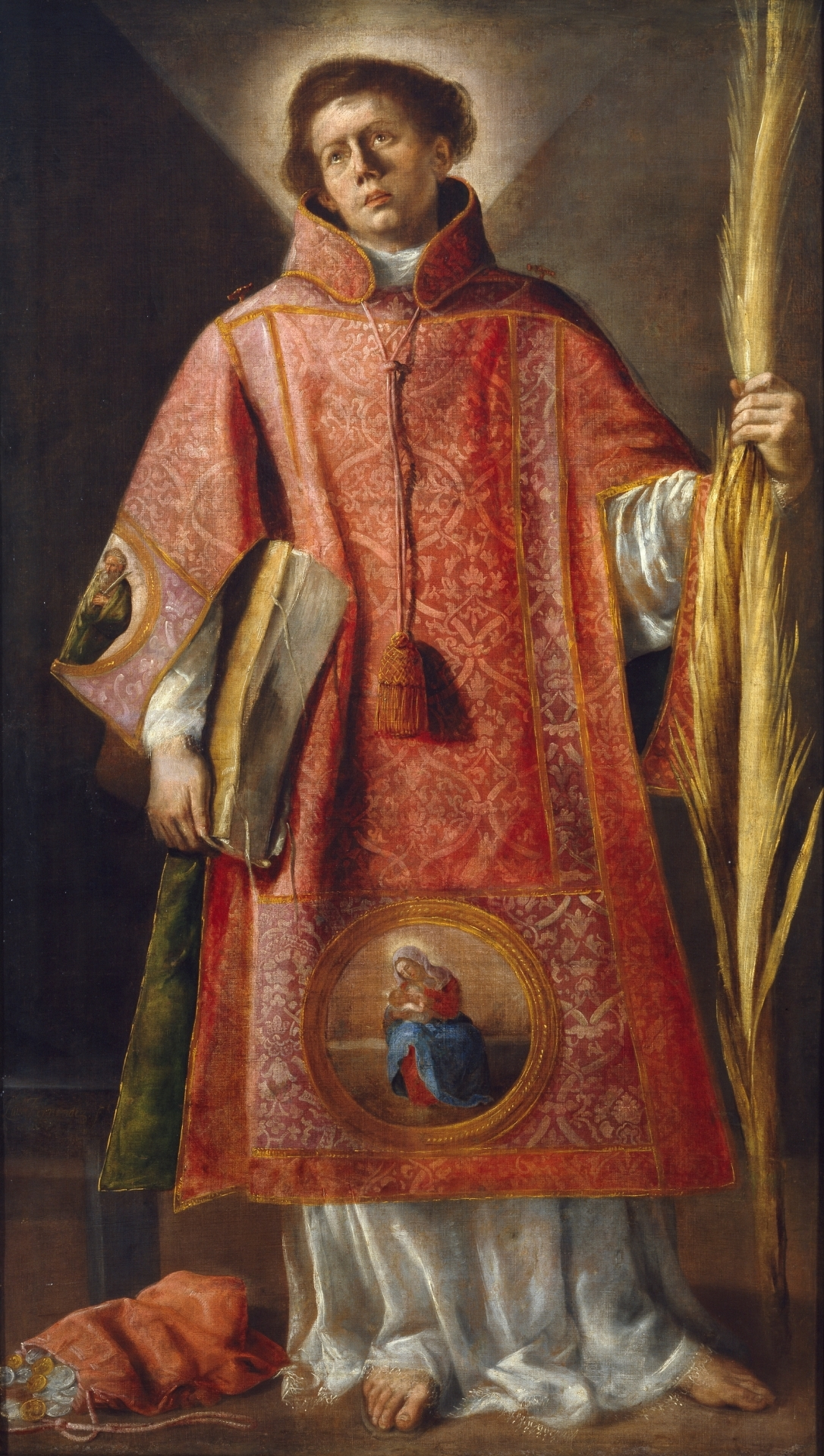
San Lorenzo, 1632, now in the Museo del Prado

Luis Fernández (1594–1654), a Spanish historical painter, both in oil and in fresco, born at Madrid in 1594, was a pupil of Eugenio Caxes. There are by him in the cross-walk of the convent of La Merced Calzada scenes from the life of St. Ramon, painted in 1625, and in Santa Cruz were several frescoes and oil paintings, which perished, however, by fire in the 17th century. His works, executed in the style of his master, are distinguished for correctness of design and beauty of colouring. He died at Madrid in 1654.

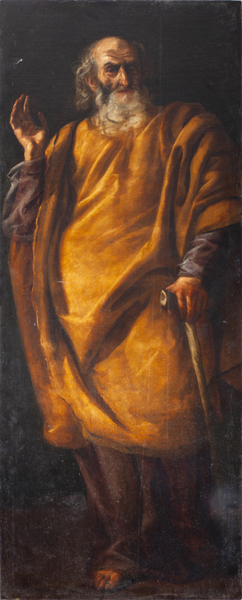
Saint Joachim (Colegiata de Pastrana)

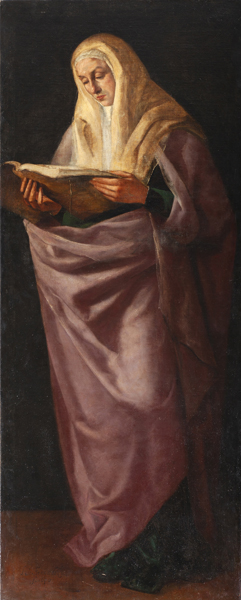
Saint Anna (Colegiata de Pastrana)
