= Ramon Santamarina =

Argentine businessman of Spanish origin (1827-1904)

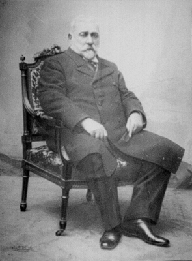
- Ramon Santamarina
- Born: February 25, 1827; Ourense, Spain
- Died: August 23, 1904 (aged 77); Buenos Aires, Argentina
- Occupation: Businessman
- Spouses: Ana Alduncin; Anne Irazusta
- Children: 4 (with first wife), 13 (with second wife)
- Parent(s): Jose Garcia Santamarina and Manuela Varela

Joaquin Ramon Cesareo Manuel Santamarina (February 25, 1827 – August 23, 1904) was an Argentine businessman of Spanish origin. After arriving in Argentina at the age of seventeen, he acquired many ranches and eventually founded Santamarina and Sons, which is one of the major cattle companies of Argentina in the 2020s.

His descendants played a significant role in the economy and politics of Argentina. Ramon Santamarina, his first son became president of the National Bank of Argentina, while his other son Enrique became vice president of Argentina in 1930.

== Family ==
Ramon Santamarina was born on February 25, 1827, in Ourense, Spain. His parents were members of noble families of Galicia. His father Jose was the captain of the civil Royal Guard of Ferdinand VII of Spain. He spent most of his childhood in Ourense, until his father was transferred in A Coruña in 1835.

His father had lost most of the family's fortune. While being in A Coruña, Jose Santamarina due to his large economic problems committed suicide in front of Ramon.

After the death of his mother, he lived with his uncle Ramon de Francisco until 1844, when he emigrated to Argentina. After giving birth to four children his first wife, Ana Alduncin, died in 1866. After many years he married Anne Irazustra, with whom he had thirteen children. Ramon Santamarina committed suicide on August 23, 1904. His funeral was attended by many important individuals of Buenos Aires.

== Career ==
On August 20, 1844, Santamarina arrived in Argentina. At first he worked at an inn called Inn of the Four Nations, and afterwards at a local ranch. In 1845 he settled Tandil, where he worked in the ranch San Ciriaco, owned by Ramon Gomez. After earning enough money he started a small goods transport business, which evolved rapidly.

From 1845 until 1883, when a railroad station was built in Tandil, Santamarina was the main supplier of the city. Tandil became the center of his businesses. During that period he bought 20,700 cattle, and six warehouses and banks.

Santamarina enlarged his fortune during the Crimean War due to the export of leather by his business. In 1896 Christian IX of Denmark awarded Santamarina the Knight Order of the Dannebrog, because of his efforts for the settlement of Danish emigrants in Buenos Aires.

=== Santamarina & Sons ===
On July 1, 1890, Santamarina established the Santamarina & Sons company. The firm was devoted to various branches of economy, among which are rural and urban government establishments, industrial, banking businesses, and fruit transport. Among its facilities are: Bella Vista, La Colina, La Elvira, Energy, La Fortuna, La Gloria, La Providencia, La Totora, Will, the Roses, Las Gaviotas, Los Angeles, Los Gauchos, Meriland, Ramon R, San Alberto, San Jose and San Ramon, San Pedro, Santa Elena and Sarah, among others. All these establishments are scattered throughout the provinces of Buenos Aires, Santa Fe and Santiago del Estero.

By 2020, the company was headed by Marcelo de Alzaga, grandson of Jorge Alejandro Santamarina, and directed by Carlos Fernando Santamarina and José Ramón Santamarina, all of which are fourth generation descendants of Ramon Santamarina.

== Legacy ==
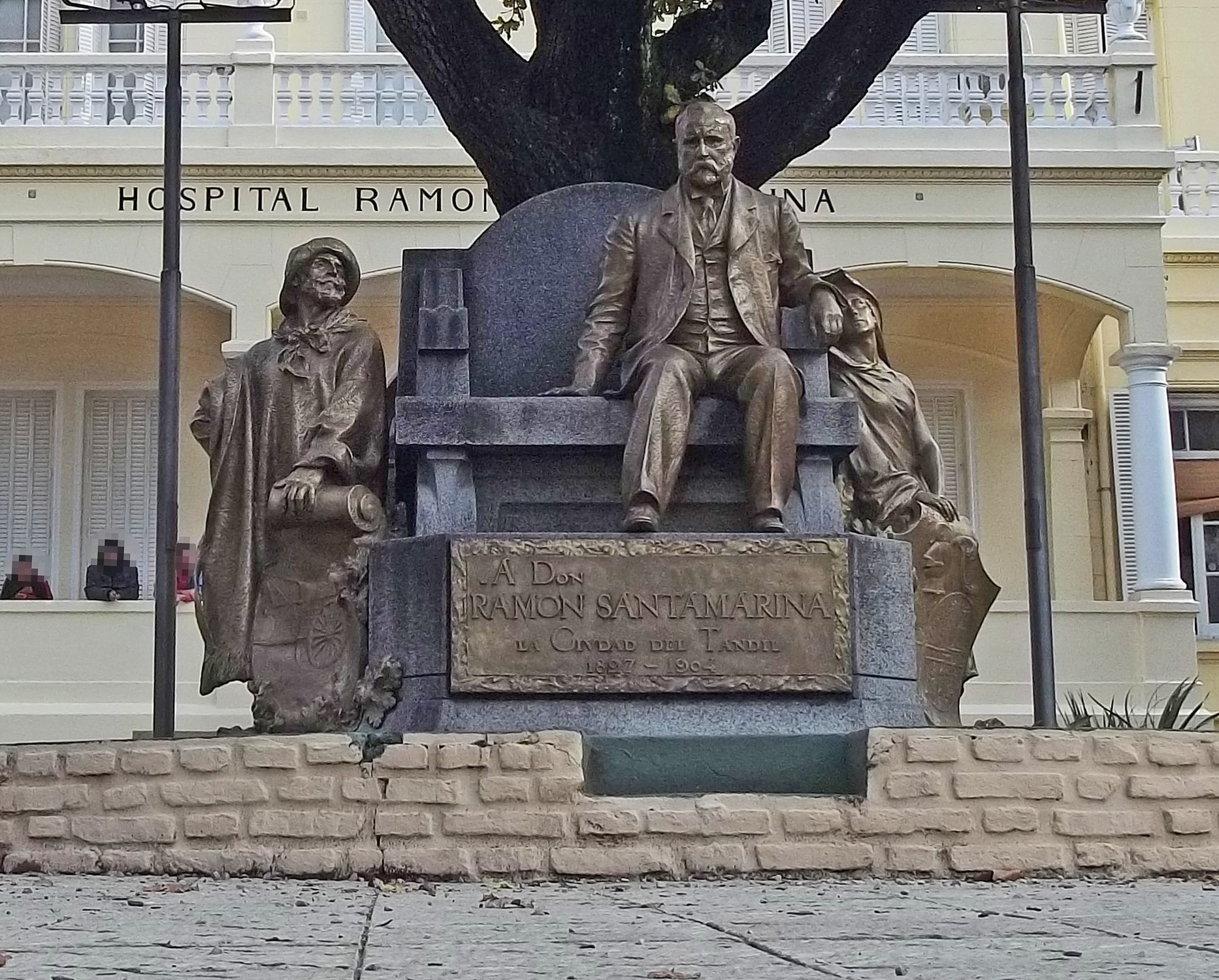
Monument of Ramon Santamarina in Tandil.

The college of San Jose in Tandil was built to honor Ramon Santamarina, while the city's hospital was named after him on March 10, 1912. In Tandil stands a monument created by the sculptor Miguel Bay. In the province of Buenos Aires in Argentina, a town was named after his birthplace of Ourense, while another town was named after himself.

The football club Club y Biblioteca Ramón Santamarina was named in his honour.
