= 2020 in West Africa =

The following lists events that happened during 2020 in West Africa.

== January ==
- January 3
  - Nineteen people are killed and homes and other buildings are burned by unidentified gunmen in Tawari, Kogi State, Nigeria.
- January 6 – 2020 Gamboru bombing: 30 killed and 35 injured in a bomb explosion in Gamboru, Borno State, Nigeria.
- January 7
  - Emeritus Archbishop of Lomé, Togo, Philippe Fanoko Kossi Kpodzro, calls for the suspension the February 22 presidential election to pave the way for electoral reforms.
  - President João Lourenço of Angola congratulates Guinea-Bissau president-elect Umaro El Mokhtar Sissoco Embaló for his December 29 election.
- January 8 – West Africa's largest wind farm opens in Taiba NDiaye, Tivaouane Department, Senegal.
- January 10 – Fête du Vodoun, Benin
- January 13
  - Leaders of Burkina Faso, Chad, Mali, Mauritania, and Niger join French President Emmanuel Macron in discussing security issues at a summit in Pau, Pyrénées-Atlantiques, France.
  - President Issoufou Mahamadou fires Niger's army chief of staff after attacks against have killed at least 174 security force members since December.
  - President-Elect for Guinea Bissau, Umaro Sissoco Embalóu, visits the Gambia.
- January 14
  - Authorities in Ivory Coast say they rescued 137 children from Benin, Ghana, Niger, Nigeria, and Togo, aged 6 to 17, who were the victims of traffickers and groomed to work on cocoa plantations or in prostitution.
  - Mamadou Diagna Ndiaye, president of the Senegalese Olympic Committee, promises Dakar will be ready to host the 2022 Summer Youth Olympics.
- January 15
  - The United States calls for a reduction of the United Nations Multidimensional Integrated Stabilization Mission in Mali (MINUSMA) with a new focus on protecting civilians. France and Russia oppose reductions.
  - Senegalese-born American rapper Akon (Locked Up) announces that plans for his new city, called "Akon City" and located near the Léopold Sédar Senghor International Airport have been finalized. The new city will trade exclusively in his digital coin Akoin.
  - The office of Karamba Diaby, who was born in Marsassoum Arrondissement, Sédhiou Region, Senegal, a member of the German Bundestag (English: Parliament) from Halle (Saale), Saxony-Anhalt, and a member of the Social Democratic Party of Germany, is shot at.
  - The International Maritime Bureau (IMO) says piracy in the Gulf of Guinea increased 50% in 2019.
- January 16
  - Three aid workers who were held hostage since 22 December 2019 are released in Borno State, Nigeria.
  - Henry Costa, chairman of the Council of Patriots (COP), was arrested in Freetown, Sierra Leone on January 15. Despite an extradition request from Liberia, on January 16 Costa boarded a Royal Air Maroc flight, presumably en route to the United States.
- January 20: Gambian Justice Minister Abubacarr Tambadou warns that former president Yahya Jammeh will be charged and arrested if he returns to the Gambia.
- January 22 – Globeleq and the government of Togo sign an agreement to develop between 24MW and 30MW of reliable, low cost, 100% renewable energy to support Togo's industrial development.
- January 24
  - Lassa fever outbreak kills 29 in 11 states of Nigeria this month.
  - Tens of thousands are left homeless as homes in shanty town are demolished near Félix-Houphouët-Boigny International Airport in the Ivory Coast.
- January 26: Thousands protest against a roll-back in press freedom in the Gambia. 137 people are arrested in protests against President Adama Barrow.
- January 30 – Senegal encourages a transition toward eco-farming on a national scale to protect its food supply from the effects of climate change.
- January 31
  - U.S. President Donald Trump expands the travel ban to include Nigeria and five other countries.
  - Authorities in Côte d'Ivoire oppose the release of former president Laurent Gbagbo by the International Criminal Court (ICC) because his return would destabilize the country.

== February ==
  - The United Arab Emirates gives Mauritania US $2 billion in development aid.
- February 3
  - Armed gunmen kill 18 civilians in Lamdamol, Sahel Region, Burkina Faso. A week earlier, 39 people were killed in Soum Province for a total of 110 civilian deaths this year.
  - A three-day workshop of the "Sahel Women's Empowerment and Demographic Dividend" (SWEDD) begins in Abidjan, Ivory Coast.
- February 4: US $300 million (£230 million) seized from former Nigerian president Sani Abacha's laundered accounts will be returned to Nigeria.
- February 5
  - Mawlid (Birth of the Prophet)
  - The African Development Bank (AfDB) signs a US$81.7 million loan agreement with Ghana to finance roads and community development along the 695-kilometer Eastern Corridor Road.
  - The 2020 Sunhak Peace Prize is awarded to President Macky Sall of Senegal and Bishop Munib Younan, the International Honorary President of Religions for Peace.
- February 6
  - International Day of Zero Tolerance for Female Genital Mutilation (FGM): Voice of America reports that according to UNICEF, 97% of women in Guinea and 75% in Gambia, Burkina Faso, Mali, and Sierra Leone undergo (FGM).
  - Transportation Security Administration (TSA) officials dismantle an “impossible to replace” kora belonging to Ballaké Sissoko of Mali during a security check-in New York. A note of apology written in Spanish was left in the case.
  - 5,000 African nationals from different countries cannot be evacuated from the outbreak of COVID-19 in Wuhan, China because the countries do have the resources.
  - Ghana's government promotes cashew farming.
  - Liberia ends tariff on rice.
- February 7
  - Liberia and the European Union (EU) sign a €3.5 million development agreement. They expect to sign agreements worth €42 million for rural electrification and €12 million for technical and vocational training soon.
- February 14
  - Gunmen burn houses, steal livestock, and kill 21 people in Ogossagou, Mopti Region, Mali. 150 people were massacred in the same village a year ago.
  - International flights to Murtala Muhammed International Airport in Lagos, Nigeria, are diverted to Accra International Airport in Accra, Ghana, due to poor weather and complications with new equipment.
- February 16 – Twenty-four civilians are killed and three are kidnapped near a Protestant church in Yagha Province, Burkina Faso.
- February 17 – Twenty people are trampled to death during a stampede of Nigerian refugees waiting for food in Diffa, southeastern Niger.
- February 19 – Umaro Sissoco Embola is scheduled to be inaugurated as president of Guinea Bissau
- February 22 – 2020 Togolese presidential election. Incumbent President Faure Gnassingbe wins reelection with 72% of the vote.
- February 24 – The United States shifts its military mission in Africa to training as American lawmakers oppose troop reductions.
- February 28 – Nigeria confirms the first case of COVID-19 in Sub-Saharan Africa.

== March ==
- March 12
  - Senegal reports 13 cases of COVID-19. Testing results are available in four hours (compared to a week in the U.S.), and scientists at Dakar's Pasteur Institute are working on a test that can produce results in ten minutes.
  - COVID-19 pandemic in Africa: At least 18 African countries, including Burkina Faso, Ghana, Guinea, Nigeria, Ivory Coast, Senegal, and COVID-19 pandemic in Togo report cases of COVID-19. Most are in single figures, and no deaths have been reported in Sub-Saharan Africa.
- March 14
  - Canadian Edith Blais and Italian Luca Tacchetto, who were kidnapped in Burkina Faso in 2018, are released in Mali.
- March 15
  - Senegal imposes travel restrictions, bans cruise ships, and closes schools for three weeks in response to the coronavirus. They also ban public gatherings for a month including Muslim and Christian pilgrimages.
  - Mauritania imposes travel restrictions and closes schools for three weeks in response to the coronavirus.
  - In a historic first, all Peace Corps volunteers worldwide are withdrawn from their host countries.
- March 17 – The Niger Armed Forces say they have killed 50 members of Boko Haram in Toumour.
- March 22 – 2020 Guinean legislative election and a constitutional referendum: Voters approve changes to extend the presidential term for twelve years.
- March 24 – Between 50 and 75 Nigerian soldiers are ambushed and killed by Boko Haram in Goneri village, Yobe State, Nigeria.
- March 26
  - Soumaila Cissé, the leader of the opposition in Mali, is kidnapped.
- March 29 – The 2020 Malian parliamentary election, originally scheduled for November 25 and December 16, 2018, then moved to April 2019 and then to June 2019, is held on Sunday amid kidnappings and bombings; nine people are reported dead.
- March 30 – Sierra Leone removes restrictions on pregnant girls who wish to go to school. Around 30% of girls in Sierra Leone become pregnant and 40% are married by the age of 18.

== April ==
- April 3 – Four soldiers and 63 jihadists are killed in fighting in the Tillabéri Region of Niger.
- April 6 – Protesters in Abidjan, Ivory Coast, destroy a coronavirus center, saying it was too close to a residential area.
- April 11 – Moussa Faki, Chairperson of the African Union Commission, invites the Chinese ambassador to the AU to discuss allegations of discrimination and mistreatment of hundreds of Africans in Guangzhou, southern China.
- April 13
  - 14,000 cases of COVID-19 and 788 deaths have been reported across Africa. Cases by country: Benin – 35, Burkina Faso – 497, Cape Verde – 8, The Gambia – 9, Ghana – 566, Guinea – 250, Guinea-Bissau – 38, Ivory Coast – 574, Liberia – 50, Mali – 105, Mauritania – 7, Niger – 529, Nigeria- 323, Senegal – 280, Sierra Leone – 10, Togo – 76
- April 15 – Finance ministers from the Group of 20 agree to put a hold on debt service by poor countries so they can concentrate their efforts on health service and ending the pandemic. 76 countries will be able to participate in the plan, including 40 from Sub-Saharan Africa. $8 billion in private loans and $12 billion in loans from other countries will be frozen for the remainder of 2020 and possibly beyond. Another $12 billion in multilateral loans from organizations such as the World Bank is also under consideration.
- April 17 – Considerable fake news about COVID-19 is circulating in Africa.
- April 20 – COVID-19 pandemic: Ghana lifts lockdown rules in Accra and Kuasi, citing improved COVID-19 testing and the "severe" impact of the restrictions on the poor and vulnerable. Ghana reports 1,042 cases and nine deaths from COVID-19 and 68,000 people have been tested.
- April 22 – The World Health Organization (WHO) warns that the number of malaria deaths in Africa may double this year as efforts to curb the disease wind down.
- April 24 – Concord Day, Niger
- April 25 – COVID-19 pandemic: Burkina Faso has 629 cases and 41 deaths, including Rose Marie Compaore, the second Vice President of the parliament. About 50 doctors were confirmed positive this week.
- April 28 – Former Ivory Coast Prime Minister and leader of the Patriotic Movement of Côte d'Ivoire Guillaume Soro is fined $7.6 million (£6.1 million) for embezzlement and money laundering. Soro, who lives in exile in France, says the move is designed to remove him from the 2020 Ivorian presidential election.
- April 29
  - A new polio outbreak is reported in Niger, unrelated to last year's outbreak.
  - COVID-19 pandemic: Infections surge 24% in ten days to over 2,000 cases as Ghana lifts lockdown.

== May ==
- May 2 – A French soldier is killed during Operation Barkhane by terrorists in Mali. Two other soldiers were injured in the April 23 attack in the Liptako region of southeast central Mali.
- May 6
  - Nine-year-old Joselia Kollie of Liberia writes a popular song about the COVID-19 pandemic.
  - A sandstorm covers Niamey, Niger.
- May 8 – Guinean-born Roman Catholic Cardenal Robert Sarah finds himself in the middle of a controversy over COVID-19.
- May 9 – Jihadist activity in Burkina Faso forces the closing of gold mines.
- May 13
  - The Defense Ministry in Niger says that 75 Boko Haram extremists have been killed in operations this week.
  - COVID-19 pandemic: A COVID-19 survivor is stoned in Ghana.
- May 17 – COVID-19 pandemic: Fears grow of spread of COVID-19 as mosques reopen in the region.
- May 28 – The International Criminal Court gives permission the former president of the Ivory Coast, Laurent Gbagbo, to leave Belgium if certain conditions are met.

== June ==
- June 1
  - Gunmen attack a refugee camp in Intikane of 35,000 people in Niger, killing three and cutting off water supplies.
- June 2 – Encouraged by protests against the murder of George Floyd in the United States and around the world, Nigerians have gone public with protests against violence. #JusticeForUwa, #JusticeForTina, and #JusticeForJennifer are some of the rallying cries on social media.
- June 3 – The government of The Gambia has demanded a "transparent, credible and objective investigation" into the shooting death of Momodou Lamin Sisay, 39—the son of Lare Sisay, a retired diplomat—by police in Snellville, Georgia, the United States.
- June 4 – The board of the African Development Bank agrees to an investigation into president Akinwumi Adesina. Adesina is up for reelection in August.
- June 5
  - French forces kill Abdelmalek Droukdel, the leader of al-Qaeda in the Islamic Maghreb (AQIM) near Tessalit in northern Mali. They had arrested Mohamed el Mrabat on May 19.
  - Thousands march in Bamako to demand the resignation of Mali President Ibrahim Boubacar Keita, alleging corruption, arbitrary arrests, and organization of the April legislative elections.
- June 9 - Gunmen suspected of belonging to Boko Haram kill 81 villagers in Gubio, Borno State, Nigeria. Another 20 people are killed in an attack in Katsina State.
- June 10
  - Armed rebels kill ten soldiers in Sikolo, Kong Department, Ivory Coast.
  - Amnesty International accuses security forces of Mali, Niger, and Burkina Faso of unlawfully killing or causing the disappearance of around 200 people this year and says they could be war crimes.
- June 12
  - World Day Against Child Labor: The International Labour Organization and the UNICEF warn that millions of children are likely to be pushed into forced labor because of the economic fallout from the COVID-19 pandemic.
- June 13 – Authorities in Cape Verde arrest Alex Saab, a businessman accused by the U.S. of corrupt dealings with President Nicolás Maduro's government in Venezuela, while en route to Iran .
- June 27 – Incumbent Ghana President Akufo-Addo, 76, is chosen by the ruling New Patriotic Party (NPP) to run for reelection against former president John Dramani Mahama, 61, on December 7.

== July ==
- July 8
  - At least 180 bodies are found in mass graves in Djibo, Burkina Faso, where soldiers are fighting jihadists. It is suspected that the government forces were involved in mass extrajudicial executions.
  - Ivorian Prime Minister Amadou Gon Coulibaly, dies.
- July 12
  - French Defence Minister Florence Parly announces that the European Union will deploy 100 French and Estonian troops to Mali starting July 15. Sixty Czech soldiers will be sent in October, followed by 150 Swedish troops in January 2021. Italy will also send troops.
  - Protests continue in Mali after eleven people were killed on July 10 and 11.
- July 13 – Vice President Daniel Kablan Duncan, 77, of the Ivory Coast resigns for personal reasons.
- July 18
  - Between three and 16 security forces are killed in a clash with criminals near Jibia in Katsina state, Nigeria.
  - Four people are killed as hundreds protest the relocation of a power generator in Sierra Leone.
- July 23 – Economic Community of West African States negotiations to solve Mali's political crisis as the political opposition renews protests to force President Ibrahim Boubcar Keita to leave office three years before his term ends.
- July 27 – COVID-19 pandemic: Dr. Francesco Branca of the World Health Organization says that COVID-19-linked hunger is leading to 10,000 child deaths per month.
- July 30 – 31: Eid al-Adha Islamic Festival of the Sacrifice

== August ==
- August 3
  - Pidjiguiti Day, Guinea-Bissau
- August 6 – Mauritanian President Mohamed Ould Ghazouani appoints Mohamed Ould Bilal as prime minister after Ismail Ould Cheikh Sidiya resigns in a corruption scandal.
- August 9 – Governor Tidjani Ibrahim of Tillabéri Region, Niger, reports that six French tourists are among eight people killed by unknown attackers.
- August 11 – Nigeria convicts three under its anti-piracy laws; trials for six others continue.
- August 18
  - Malian President Ibrahim Boubacar Keita and Prime Minister Boubou Cisse are arrested in a coup. They both step down to prevent bloodshed.
  - Former Mauritanian president Mohamed uld Abdel Aziz (2008-2019) is arrested on charges of corruption.
- August 19 and 20 – Islamic New Year
- August 21
  - Senegalese authorities request the removal of 2,700 tons of ammonium nitrate (NH_{4}NO_{3}) from the port of Dakar. Ammonium nitrate, which can be used to make fertilizer, was involved in the deadly August 4 2020 Beirut explosion. The shipment is destined for Mali, but the border is closed.
  - The Independent Election commission (CEI) of the Ivory Coast rejects the candidacies of President Alassane Ouattara and former rebel leader Guillaume Soro in the October election.
- August 23 – The National Committee for the Salvation of the People of Mali stops the export of livestock to other members of the Economic Community of West African States (ECOWAS).
- August 25
  - The WHO reports wild polio eradication in Africa. The announcement was made by Tedros Adhanom Ghebreyesus and Matshidiso Moeti of WHO, Aliko Dangote, and Bill Gates.
  - The Attorney General of Cape Verde opens an investigation into two men who posed as representatives of Venezuelan President Nicolás Maduro in favor of Colombian Alex Saab.

== September ==
- September 3 – At least ten Malian soldiers are killed in an ambush near the border with Mauritania.
- September 7 – 2020 Malian coup d'état: ECOWAS renews calls for a quick return to civilian rule in Mali.
- September 12 – 2020 Malian coup d'état: The Comité national pour le salut du peuple (in French) (National Committee for the Salvation of the People, CNSP) agrees to an 18-month political transition to civilian rule in Mali.
- September 16 – Lamine Diack, 87, former director of the International Amateur Athletic Federation (IAAF), is condemned to four years of prison and fined €500,000 for allowing Russian doping at the Olympics. His son, Papa Massata Diack, who is refuged in Senegal, was sentenced to five years and fined €1 million.
- September 20 – Godwin Obaseki of the People's Democratic Party wins reelection as governor of Edo State, Nigeria.
- September 25 – Bah Ndaw becomes interim president of Mali's provisional government.

== October ==
- October 5—6 – Grand Magal of Touba, Senegal
- October 18 – 2020 Guinean presidential election
- October 31 – 2020 Ivorian presidential election

== November—December ==
- November 16 – COVID-19 pandemic: The United Nations World Food Programme (WFP) warns of famines in the developing world in 2021 as economic funds dry up.
- November 22 – 2020 Burkinabé general election
- December 7 – 2020 Ghanaian general election: President Nana Addo Dankwa Akufo-Addo is re-elected for a second term with 51.3% of the votes, but former President John Dramani Mahama says he will contest the results.
- December 10 – Migrants die in Barcelona fire.
- December 15
  - French Armed Forces are exposed for meddling in African politics with 84 fake accounts on Facebook and 14 on Instagram. Russia has also used social media to meddle in African politics.
  - The Coffee and Cocoa Council and the Ghana Cocoa Board accuse The Hershey Company of manipulating the futures market and the Living Income Differential and avoid paying fair wages to cocoa workers.
- December 17 – The Benin-Nigeria border reopens after a 16-month closure.
- December 27 – 2020 Nigerien general election
- December 28 – Burkina Faso President Roch Marc Christian Kabore is sworn in for a second term after winning the 2020 Burkinabé general election in November.

== Culture ==
=== Fashion ===
- July 7 – Ghana Textiles Printing launches a new line of designs inspired by the COVID-19 pandemic.
- December 13 – Dakar's Fashion Week catwalk is moved to an outdoor baobab forest because of COVID-19 restrictions.

=== Film and video ===
- January 23 – Cuties ((in French): "Mignonnes"), a film by French director of Senegalese descent Maïmouna Doucouré, premiers at the 2020 Sundance Film Festival. It goes on to win the Directing Jury Award.
- February – The New York City Mayor's Office of Immigrant Affairs released a list of more than fifteen videos in Wolof, Fulani, and Arabic languages.
- March 4 to May 8, 2020 – African Film Festival at the University of California, Berkeley.
- Africa Movie Academy Award for Best Film: The Milkmaid

=== Literature ===
- February 11 – Nobel Lauret Wole Soyinka gives the keynote address at the regional African Humanities Program assembly in Abuja, Nigeria.
- July 27 – Nigerian Irenosen Okojie wins the AKO Caine Prize for African Writing for her short story, "Grace Jones."

=== Music ===
- May 10 – Nigerians Don Jazzy, Wizkid, Jidenna, and Davido are listed by Forbes Africa among the top 10 richest African musicians.

=== Sports ===
- November 29, 2019 – 1 February 1, 2020: 2019–20 CAF Champions League group stage
- December 1, 2019 – 2 February 2, 2020: 2019–20 CAF Confederation Cup group stage
- January – Groups are announced for the 2022 FIFA World Cup qualification in October.
- January 17 – 21 June: 2020 African U-20 Women's World Cup Qualifying Tournament
- February 4 – The Chinese construction firm that is renovating the Samuel Kanyon Doe Sports Complex (SKD) in Paynesville, outside Monrovia, pleads with Liberians to maintain the stadium.
- February 20 – 29: 2020 African Boxing Olympic Qualification Tournament, Diamniadio, Senegal
- May TBA – Finals of 2020 African U-17 Women's World Cup Qualifying Tournament; began January 2020
- June 21 – Finals of 2020 African U-20 Women's World Cup Qualifying Tournament
- October 5 – October: 2022 FIFA World Cup qualification – CAF second round

== Deaths ==
=== January and February ===
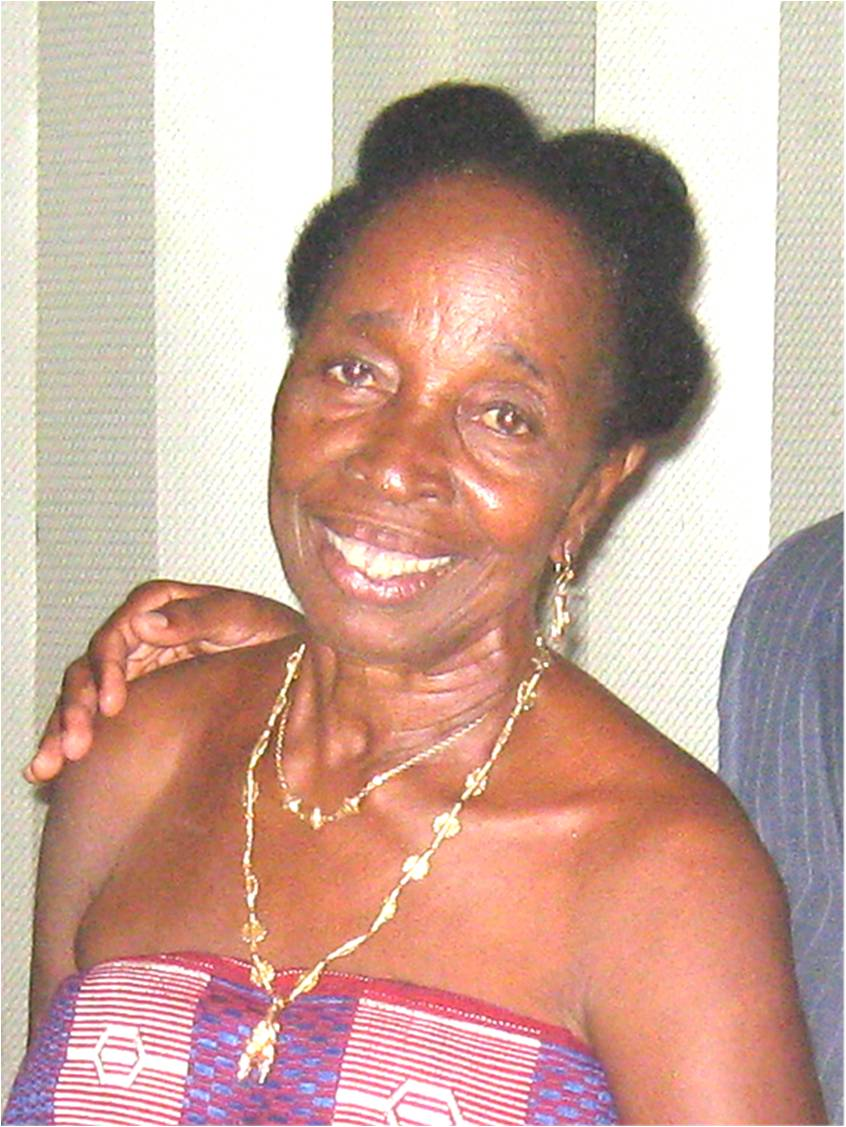
Allah Thérèse

- January 5 – Issiaka Ouattara, 53, Ivorian rebel general (First Ivorian Civil War)
- January 9
  - Chukwuemeka Ike, 88, Nigerian writer
  - Matthew Quashie, 68, Ghanaian naval officer
- January 19
  - Charles Carrère, 91, Senegalese poet
  - Allah Thérèse, Ivorian traditional singer
- January 22 – John S. Pobee, 82, Ghanaian theologian
- January 27 – James Houra, 67, Ivorian painter
- February 2 – Peter Aluma, 46, Nigerian basketball player (Liberty University, Sacramento Kings)
- February 4 – Asiwaju Yinka Mafe, 46, Nigerian politician
- February 12 – Victor Olaiya, 89, Nigerian highlife trumpeter
- February 14
  - Peter Iornzuul Adoboh, 61, Nigerian Roman Catholic prelate, bishop of Katsina-Ala (since 2013)
  - Adama Kouyaté, 92, Malian photographer
- February 16 – Erickson Le Zulu, 41, Ivorian disc jockey; liver cirrhosis
- February 20 – Emmanuel Emovon, 90, Nigerian chemist and academic

=== March and April ===
- March 1 – Pa Kasumu, 66, Nigerian actor
- March 2 – Edward Kwabi, Ghanaian journalist (TV3 Ghana)
- March 5 – Solomon Berewa, 81, Sierra Leonean politician, Vice-President (2002–2007)
- March 12 – Mobio Besse Henri, 42, Ivorian boxer
- March 17 – Manuel Serifo Nhamadjo, 61, Bissau-Guinean politician, Acting President of the National People's Assembly (2009, 2012) and Acting President (2012–2014)
- March 18
  - Rose Marie Compaoré, 62, Burkina Faso's second Vice President of the National Assembly; COVID-19
  - Kenneth Kafui, 68, Ghanaian composer
- March 21 – Eldred D. Jones, 95, Sierra Leonean literary critic
- March 22 – Ifeanyi George, 26, Nigerian footballer (Enyimba, national team); traffic collision
- March 27 – Jacques F. Acar, 88, Senegalese-born French doctor
- March 29 – Opoku Afriyie, 75, Ghanaian soccer player (Asante Kotoko, Hearts of Oak, national team)
- March 30 – Kwasi Owusu, 72, Ghanaian soccer player (Ghana national football team)
- March 31 – Pape Diouf, 68, Senegalese journalist, COVID-19
- April 4 – Founéké Sy, 33, Malian soccer player (Korofina, Sanat Naft, national team); traffic collision
- April 7 – Thomas Mensah, 87, Ghanaian judge
- April 10 – Jacob Plange-Rhule, Ghanaian physician, Rector of the Ghana College of Physicians and Surgeons; COVID-19
- April 11 – Edem Kodjo, 81, Togolese politician, Prime Minister (1994–1996, 2005–2006) and Chairperson of the African Union Commission (1978–1983)
- April 14 – Akin Euba, 84, Nigerian musician
- April 17 – Abba Kyari, 67, Nigerian politician, Chief of Staff to the President (since 2015), COVID-19
- April 18 – Sékou Kourouma, Guinean politician and political aide, Chief of Staff to President Alpha Condé, COVID-19
- April 20 – Marie Rose Guiraud, 75, Ivorian dancer and choreographer
- April 21
  - Richard Akinjide, 89, Nigerian jurist, Minister of Justice (1979–1983)
  - Belco Bah, Malian politician, member of the National Assembly for Niono, COVID-19

=== May and June ===
- May 2 – Bernard Nyarko, Ghanaian actor; colon cancer
- May 3 – Mohamed Ben Omar, 55, Nigerien politician, vice-president of the National Assembly (2009–2010, 2011–2016), founder and president of the PSD (since 2015)
- May 4 – Garba Nadama, 82, Nigerian politician, Governor of Sokoto (1982–1983)
- May 30 – Yawovi Agboyibo, 76, Togolese politician, Prime Minister (2006–2007)
- June 10 – Miliky MiCool, 53, Ghanaian actress; complications from high blood pressure
- June 15
  - Adebayo Osinowo, 64, Nigerian politician, member of the Senate (since 2019) and Lagos State House of Assembly (2003–2019); COVID-19
  - Nana Tuffour, 66, Ghanaian highlife singer
- June 18 – Kossi Koudagba, 24, Togolese footballer (national team, Espoir Tsevie, ASC Kara)
- June 28 – Louis Mahoney, 81, Gambian-born British actor (Omen III: The Final Conflict, Doctor Who, Captain Phillips)

=== July and August ===
- July 1
  - Kwadwo Owusu Afriyie, 61–62, Ghanaian lawyer and politician, CEO of the Forestry Commission (since 2017); COVID-19
  - Alfred Kotey, 52, Ghanaian boxer, WBO bantamweight champion (1993–1994); complications from a stroke
- July 8
  - Amadou Gon Coulibaly, 61, Ivorian politician, prime minister (since 2017) and candidate in the 2020 presidential election
  - Munah E. Pelham-Youngblood, 36, Liberian politician, member of the House of Representatives (since 2011)
- July 17
  - Pierre-Marie Coty, 92, Ivorian Roman Catholic prelate, Bishop of Daloa (1975–2005)
  - Daniel Ato Kwamina Mensah, 66, Ghanaian banker and economist, CEO of Ghana Association of Bankers
- July 18 – Baba Ibrahim Suma-Keita, 73, Sierra Leonean Olympic long-distance runner (1980, 1988)
- July 19
  - Biri Biri, 72, Gambian footballer (Wallidan Banjul, Sevilla, national team)
  - Doris Dartey, Ghanaian journalist; complications from cancer
  - Seydou Diarra, 86, Ivorian politician, Prime Minister (2000, 2003–2005)
- July 28 — Zou Diarra, Malian musician
- August 7 – Michael Ojo, 27, Nigerian-American basketball player (FMP, Crvena zvezda); heart attack

=== September and October ===
- September 15 –Moussa Traoré, 83, Malian military officer and politician, President (1968–1991).
- October 15 – Fambaré Ouattara Natchaba, 75, Togolese politician, President of the National Assembly (2000–2005), Minister of Foreign Affairs (1992–1994) and MP (1994–2005).

=== November and December ===
- November 12 – Jerry Rawlings, 73, Ghanaian politician, President of Ghana (1979, 1981–2001); COVID-19.
- November 23 – Sidi Ould Cheikh Abdallahi, 82, Mauritanian politician, President (2007–2008).
- November 24 – Mamadou Tandja, 82, Nigerien politician, President (1999–2010).
- December 25 – Soumaila Cissé, 71, Malian politician; COVID-19.

== See also ==
- 2020 in politics and government
- 2020s in political history
- Economic Community of West African States
- Community of Sahel–Saharan States
- 2020 in East Africa
- 2020 in Middle Africa
- 2020 in North Africa
- 2020 in Southern Africa
- G5 Sahel
- COVID-19 pandemic in Africa
- List of George Floyd protests outside the United States
- 2021 in West Africa
