= 2021 in Middle Africa =

The following lists events that happened during 2021 in Middle Africa, also called Central Africa.

== Countries ==
=== Angola ===
(Angola)

- President of Angola: João Lourenço (since 2017)
  - Vice President: Bornito de Sousa (since 2017)

=== Cameroon ===
(Cameroon)

- President of Cameroon: Paul Biya (since 1982)
- Prime Minister of Cameroon: Joseph Ngute (since 2019)
  - Deputy Prime Minister Amadou Ali (since 2014)

==== Ambazonia ====
The Federal Republic of Ambazonia is a self-proclaimed independent state in western Cameroon.

- Disputed President of Ambazonia
  - Samuel Ikome Sako (de facto since February 2018)
  - Sisiku Julius Ayuk Tabe (since May 2019)

=== Central African Republic ===
(Central African Republic)

- President: Faustin-Archange Touadéra (since 2016)
- Prime Minister: Firmin Ngrébada (since 2019)

=== Chad ===
(Chad)

- President: Lt. Gen. Idriss Déby (since 1990)

=== Democratic Republic of the Congo (DRC) ===
(Democratic Republic of the Congo)

- President of the Democratic Republic of the Congo: Félix Tshisekedi (since 2019)
- Prime Minister
  - Sylvestre Ilunga (until January 29)
- Deputy Prime Ministers: Jose Makila, Leonard She Okitundu, Henri Mova Sankanyi (since 2018)

=== Equatorial Guinea ===
(Equatorial Guinea)

- President: Brig. Gen. Teodoro Obiang Nguema Mbasogo (since 1979)
  - Vice President of Equatorial Guinea: Teodoro Nguema Obiang Mangue (since 2012)
- Prime Minister: Francisco Pascual Obama Asue (since 2016)
  - First Deputy Prime Minister Clemente Engonga Nguema Onguene (since 2016)
  - Second Deputy Prime Minister Angel Mesie Mibuy (since 2018)
  - Third Deputy Prime Minister Alfonso Nsue Mokuy (since 2016)

=== Gabon ===
(Gabon)

- President: Ali Bongo Ondimba (since 2009)
- Vice President:
- Prime Minister Rose Christiane Raponda (since 2020)

=== Republic of the Congo (Brazzaville) ===
(Republic of the Congo)

- President: Denis Sassou Nguesso (since October 25, 1997)
- Prime Minister: Clément Mouamba (since April 23, 2016)

=== São Tomé and Príncipe ===
(São Tomé and Príncipe)

- President Evaristo Carvalho (since 2016)
- Prime Minister Jorge Bom Jesus (since 2018)

== Monthly events ==
=== January and February ===
- January 1 – The African Continental Free Trade Area officially begins.
- January 4 – 2020–21 Central African general election: Preliminary results show that President Touadera has won reelection with 53% of the vote. Turnout was 76.3% of registered voters.
- January 9 – Refugees flee the Central African Republic as tensions rise. 24,000 have gone to the DR Congo, 4,500 to Cameroon, 2,200 to Chad, and 70 to the Republic of the Congo.
- January 13 – A U.N. peacekeeper from Rwanda is killed in fighting near Bangui, Central African Republic.
- January 24 – The Turkish Armed Forces plan a rescue mission for the M/V Mozart, which was attacked by pirates in the Gulf of Guinea near Sao Tome and Principe on January 23. Fifteen sailors have been kidnapped and one killed.
- January 30 – The International Conference on the Great Lakes Region warns about regional stability as the Central African Republic Civil War intensifies. 93,000 refugees have seek protection in the Democratic Republic of the Congo and 13,000 in Chad, the Republic of the Congo, and Cameroon; another 100,000 are internally displaced. Travel between Cameroon and Bangui is nearly impossible.
- February 4 – U.S. Immigration and Customs Enforcement (ICE) cancels deportation of asylum-seeking refugees from Cameroon, Angola, and Congo because of allegations of brutality by ICE agents in the treatment of the deportees.
- February 12 – Turkish sailors kidnapped by pirates in January are freed.
- February 19 – Equatorial Guinea plans to move its embassy in Israel to Jerusalem.

=== March and April ===
- March 8 – The International Criminal Court (ICC) ruled that Bosco Ntaganda′s victims should be compensated with USD $30 million, the highest amount ever rewarded. Since Ntaganda does not have the money to pay, the Court will use its own funds to compensate victims.

== Predicted and scheduled events ==
=== Elections ===
- April 10 – 2021 Chadian presidential election
- October 23 – 2021 Chadian parliamentary election
- 2021 Republic of the Congo presidential election
- 2021 São Toméan presidential election

=== Holidays ===
==== January to April ====
- January 1 – New Year's Day, holiday celebrated throughout region
- January 4 – Martyrs' Day, Democratic Republic of the Congo.
- January 16 – Heroes' Day (Laurent-Désiré Kabila), Democratic Republic of the Congo.
- January 17 – Heroes′ Day (Patrice Lumumba), Democratic Republic of the Congo.
- February 3 – Martyrs' Day, São Tomé and Príncipe.
- February 4 – Liberation Day, Angola.
- February 11 – Youth Day, Cameroon.
- February 16 – Carnival Tuesday, Angola.
- March 8 – International Women's Day, widely celebrated throughout region
- March 29 – Barthélemy Boganda Day, Central African Republic.
- April 2 – Good Friday, Christian holiday celebrated in Angola, Cameroon, Equatorial Guinea, São Tomé and Príncipe.
- April 5
  - Peace Day, Angola.
  - Easter Monday, Christian holiday celebrated in Central African Republic, Chad, Republic of the Congo, Gabon,
- April 17: Women's Day, Gabon.

==== May to August ====
- May 1 – Labour Day or International Workers' Day
- May 13/14
  - Feast of the Ascension, Christian feast celebrated in Cameroon, Gabon,
  - Eid al-Fitr or Korité, Muslim feast of Breaking the Fast.
- May 17 – Liberation Day, Democratic Republic of the Congo.
- May 20 – National Day (Cameroon).
- May 24 – Whit Monday, Christian feast celebrated in Central African Republic, Congo, Gabon,
- June 3 – Feast of Corpus Christi, Equatorial Guinea.
- June 5 – Presidents' Day, Equatorial Guinea.
- June 10 – Reconciliation Day, Republic of the Congo.
- June 30
  - General Prayer Day, Central African Republic,
  - Independence Day, Democratic Republic of the Congo (from Belgium, 1960).
- July 12 – Independence Day, São Tomé and Príncipe (from Portugal, 1975).
- July 20 – Eid al-Adha or Tabaski, Muslim feast of the Sacrifice.
- August 1 – Parents' Day, Democratic Republic of the Congo.
- August 3: Freedom Day, Equatorial Guinea.
- August 11 – Independence Day, Chad (from France, 1960).
- August 13 – Independence Day, Central African Republic (from France, 1960),
- August 15
  - Assumption of Mary, Roman Catholic feast celebrated in Cameroon, Gabon,
  - Independence Day, Republic of the Congo (from France, 1960).
  - Constitution Day, Equatorial Guinea.
- August 16–17 – Independence Day, Gabon.

==== September to December ====
- September 6 – Armed Forces Day, São Tomé and Príncipe.
- September 17 – Heroes' Day, honors Agostinho Neto in Angola.
- September 30 – Agricultural Reform Day, São Tomé and Príncipe (from Portugal, 1975).
- October 12 – Independence Day, Equatorial Guinea (from Spain, 1968).
- October 19 – Mawlid, Muslim feast honoring Muhammad's birthday.
- November 1 – All Saints' Day, Christian feast day in Central African Republic, Republic of the Congo, Gabon,
- November 2 – All Souls' Day, Roman Catholic feast in Angola.
- November 28 – Republic Day, Republic of the Congo.
- November 29 – Republic Day, Chad.
- December 1
  - Republic Day, Central African Republic.
  - Freedom and Democracy Day, Chad.
- December 8 – Immaculate Conception, Roman Catholic feast day celebrated in Equatorial Guinea.
- December 21 – São Tomé Day, São Tomé and Príncipe.
- December 25
  - Christmas, Christian holiday
  - Family Day in Angola.

== Sports ==
- January 27 – FIFA announces on that Constant Omari failed an integrity and eligibility check and is barred from seeking reelection.

== Deaths ==
- February 24 – N'Singa Udjuu, 86, DR Congo (Zaire) politician, First State Commissioner of Zaire (1981–1982).

== See also ==
- 2021 in East Africa
- 2021 in North Africa
- 2021 in Southern Africa
- 2021 in West Africa
- COVID-19 pandemic in Africa
- Community of Sahel–Saharan States
- 2020s
- 2020s in political history
