= Public holidays in the Congo =

Public holidays in the Congo could refer to:

- Public holidays in the Democratic Republic of the Congo
- Public holidays in the Republic of the Congo
