= 2021 in East Africa =

The following lists events that happened during 2021 in East Africa. The countries listed are those described in the United Nations geoscheme for East Africa: Burundi, Comoros, Djibouti, Eritrea, Ethiopia, Kenya, Madagascar, Malawi, Mauritius, (France) Mayotte, Mozambique, (France) Réunion, Rwanda, Seychelles, Somalia, South Sudan, Tanzania, Uganda, Zambia, Zimbabwe.

== Incumbents ==
=== Burundi ===
Burundi

- Chief of state and Head of government: President: Évariste Ndayishimiye, (since 2020).
- First Vice President Gaston Sindimwo (since 2015)
- Second Vice President Joseph Butore (since 2015)

=== Comoros ===
Comoros

- Chief of state and Head of government: President Azali Assoumani (since 2016)

Comoros also claims the island of Mayotte.

=== Djibouti ===
Djibouti

- Chief of state: President Ismail Omar Guelleh (since 1999)
- Head of government: Prime Minister Abdoulkader Kamil Mohamed (since 2013)

=== Eritrea ===
Eritrea

- Chief of state and Head of government: President Isaias Afwerki (since 1993)

=== Ethiopia ===
Ethiopia

- Chief of state: President Sahle-Work Zewde (since 2018)
- Head of government:Prime Minister Abiy Ahmed (since 2018)
  - Deputy Prime Minister Demeke Mekonnen (since 2012)

=== Kenya ===
Kenya

- Chief of state and Head of government: President Uhuru Kenyatta (since 2013)
  - Deputy President: William Ruto (since 2013)

=== Madagascar ===
Madagascar

- Chief of state: President Andry Rajoelina (since 2019)
- Head of government: Prime Minister Christian Ntsay (since 2018)

=== Malawi ===
Malawi

- Chief of state and Head of government: President Lazarus Chakwera (starting 2020)
- Vice-President Saulos Chilima (since 2020)

=== Mauritius ===
Mauritius

- Chief of state: President Prithvirajsing Roopun (since 2019)
- Head of government: Prime Minister Pravind Jugnauth (since 2017)

Mauritius claims sovereignty over the Chagos Archipelago (including Diego Garcia), although this claim is disputed by the UK.

=== Mayotte ===
(Mayotte)

- Chief of state: President of France Emmanuel Macron (since 2017)
- Head of government: Prime Minister of France Édouard Philippe (since 2017)
- President of the Departmental Council Soibahadine Ibrahim Ramadani (since 2015)

Mayotte is an overseas department and region of France also claimed by Comoros.

=== Mozambique ===
Mozambique

- Chief of state: President Filipe Nyusi (since 2015)
- Head of government: Prime Minister Carlos Agostinho do Rosário (since 2015)

=== Réunion ===
Réunion is an overseas department and region of France.

- Chief of state: President Emmanuel Macron (since 2017)
- Head of government: Prime Minister of France: Édouard Philippe (since 2017)
- President of the Regional Council: Didier Robert (since 2010)

=== Rwanda ===
Rwanda

- Chief of state: President Paul Kagame (since 2000)
- Head of government: Prime Minister Édouard Ngirente (since 2017)

=== Seychelles ===
Seychelles

- Chief of state and Head of government: President Wavel Ramkalawan (starting 2020).
- Vice-President: Ahmed Afif (starting October 26, 2020)

=== Somalia ===
Somalia

- Chief of state: President Mohamed Abdullahi Mohamed (since 2017)
- Head of government: Prime Minister> Mohamed Hussein Roble (starting 2020)

==== Somaliland ====
The Republic of Somaliland claims independence from Somalia.

- President: Muse Bihi Abdi
- Vice President: Abdirahman Saylici
- Speaker of the House: Bashe Mohamed Farah
- Chairman of Elders: Suleiman Mohamoud Adan
- Chief Justice: Adan Haji Ali

=== South Sudan ===
South Sudan

- Chief of state and Head of government: President Salva Kiir (since 2011)
  - First Vice-President Taban Deng Gai (since 2016)
  - Second Vice President James Wani Igga (since 2016)

=== Tanzania ===
Tanzania

- Chief of state and Head of government: President
  - John Magufuli (died March 17)
  - Samia Suluhu (starting March 17)
- Vice-President
  - Samia Suluhu (until March 17)
- Head of government: Prime Minister: Kassim Majaliwa (since 2015)

=== Uganda ===
Uganda

- Chief of state: President, Yoweri Museveni (since 1988)
  - Vice President: Edward Ssekandi (since 2011)
- Head of government: Prime Minister Ruhakana Rugunda (since 2014)
  - First Deputy Prime Minister: Moses Ali (since 2016)
  - Second Deputy Prime Minister Kirunda Kivenjinja (since 2016)

=== Zambia ===
Zambia

- Chief of state and Head of government: President, Edgar Lungu (since 2015)
  - Vice-President Inonge Wina (since 2015)

=== Zimbabwe ===
Zimbabwe

- Chief of state: President Emmerson Mnangagwa (since 2017)
- Vice-President
  - Kembo Mohadi (until March 1)

== Monthly events ==
=== January ===
- January 13 – Sudan claims an Ethiopian military plane crossed its border. Ethiopia denies it.
- January 14
  - The World Food Programme (WFP) says that 1.35 million people in Madagascar are food insecure and need US$35 million in emergency aid.
  - U.S. Immigration and Customs Enforcement deports 100 asylum-seekers from Somalia, Ethiopia, and Kenya to Nairobi days before the inauguration of President-elect Joe Biden.
- January 18 – Internet service is restored in 90% of Uganda after a five-day blackout; Bobi Wine remains under house arrest since 15 January.
- January 19
  - Tensions rise along the border between Sudan and Ethiopia days after Sudan accused Ethiopia of violating its airspace. South Sudan has offered to mediate.
  - Cyclone Eloise makes landfall in Madagascar, killing one.
- January 23
  - Ugandan peace-keeprers in Sigaale, Adimole, and Kayitoy, Somalia, kill 189 Al-Shabaab fighters.
  - Cyclone Eloise: 100,000 people are evacuated when the hurricane hits, but flooding and damage have been slight in Mozambique. Four deaths have been confirmed.
- January 24
  - COVID-19 pandemic: Four members of the Cabinet of Zimbabwe die in the first two weeks of January.
  - Reverien Ndikuriyo is chosen as the leader of the National Council for the Defense of Democracy – Forces for the Defense of Democracy (CNDD–FDD) in Burundi.
- January 25 – Tigray War: Members of the Eritrean Army are accused of widespread looting and weaponizing hunger. Eritrea denies it has soldiers in Ethiopia.
- January 27 – The United States Department of State demands that Eritrea withdraw from Tigray.

=== February ===
- February 4 – The ICC finds Dominic Ongwen, 45, of the Lord's Resistance Army (LRA) guilty of war crimes and crimes against humanity.
- February 7 – DR Congo President Felix Tshisekedi, new chair of the African Union, says he intends to make settlement of the dispute over Ethiopia's Renaissance Dam a priority.
- February 9 – The single hospital in Mayotte is overwhelmed with COVID-19 patients.
- February 22 – Fifteen Tigrayans among Ethiopian peacekeepers who were due to return home on Monday ask to remain in South Sudan, citing fears of going back to Ethiopia.
- February 24 – Egypt endorses Sudan's proposal to internationalize the Ethiopian Renaissance Dam controversy, calling for the participation of the African Union, the United Nations, the European Union, and the United States.

=== March ===
- March 1 – Zimbabwe vice president Kembo Mohadi resigns after allegations of sexual misconduct.
- March 9 – Workers in Mauritius begin pumping 130 tons of fuel from the Chinese fishing boat Lu Rong Yuan Yu that ran aground on a coral reef.

== Scheduled events ==
=== Elections ===
- January 14 – 2021 Ugandan general election: Incumbent Yoweri Museveni was declared the winner with 5.85 million votes (58.64%); the main opposition candidate, Bobi Wine alleged fraud.
- February 8 – 2021 Somali presidential election: postponed indefinitely; international groups insist a new date be established to prevent violence.
- 2021 Somali parliamentary election
- May – 2021 Somaliland municipal elections.
- May – 2021 Somaliland parliamentary election.
- June 5 – 2021 Ethiopian general election

=== Holidays ===
==== January and February ====
- January 1 – New Year's Day, (Gregorian calendar)
- January 7 – Orthodox Christmas, Public holidays in Eritrea and Public holidays in Ethiopia
- January 12 – Zanzibar Revolution Day, Public holidays in Tanzania.
- January 15 – John Chilembwe Day, Public holidays in Malawi.
- January 26 – National Resistance Movement Day, Public holidays in Uganda.
- January 28 – Thaipusam, Public holidays and festivals in Mauritius (Tamil Hindu holiday).
- February 1 – Heroes' Day, Public holidays in Rwanda.
- February 3 – Heroes' Day, Public holidays in Mozambique.
- February 16 – Janani Luwum Day, Uganda.
- February 22 – Robert Mugabe National Youth Day, Public holidays in Zimbabwe.

==== March and April ====
- March 2 – Victory at Adwa Day, Ethiopia.
- March 3 – Martyrs' Day, Malawi.
- March 8 – International Women's Day.
- March 11 – Isra and Mi'raj, Public holidays in Djibouti, the Prophet's Night Journey.
- March 12
  - National Day, Mauritius.
  - Youth Day, Zambia.
- March 18 – Cheikh Al Maarouf Day, Public holidays in the Comoros
- March 29 – Martyrs' Day, Public holidays in Madagascar.
- April 1–3 – Maundy Thursday, Good Friday, Holy Saturday
- April 5 – Easter Monday
- April 7 – Abeid Karume Day, Tanzania.
- April 19 – Independence Day, Zimbabwe.
- April 26 – Union Day, Tanzania.

==== May and June ====
- May 1 – Labour Day or International Workers' Day
- May 5 – Patriots' Victory Day, Ethiopia.
- May 13 – Eid al-Fitr, Muslim feast of breaking of the Fast.
- May 16 – Sudan People's Liberation Army Day, Public holidays in South Sudan.
- May 24 – Independence Day (Eritrea)
- May 25 – Africa Day
- June 1 – Madaraka Day, Public holidays in Kenya.
- June 18 – Constitution Day, Public holidays in Seychelles.
- June 20 – Martyrs' Day (Eritrea)
- June 25 – Independence Day, Mozambique.
- June 26
  - Independence Day, Madagascar.
  - Independence Day, Public holidays in Somalia.
- June 27 – Independence Day, Djibouti.
- June 29 – Independence Day, Seychelles.

==== July and August ====
- July 1
  - Independence Day, Public holiday in Burundi (since 1962)
  - Independence Day, Rwanda (since 1962).
  - Republic Day, Somalia.
- July 4 – Liberation Day (Rwanda).
- July 5 – Heroes' Day, Zambia.
- July 6
  - National Day, Comoros.
  - Independence Day, Malawi.
- July 20 – Eid al-Adha, holiest Islamic feast of the year.
- July 30 – Martyrs' Day, South Sudan.
- August 8 – Nane Nane Day, Tanzania.
- August 15 – Assumption of Mary, Roman Catholic feast celebrated in the Seychelles.

==== September and October ====
- September 7 – Victory Day, Mozambique.
- October 9 – Independence Day, Uganda.
- October 11 – Huduma Day, Kenya.
- October 18 – Day of Prayer, Zambia.
- October 25 – Independence Day, Zambia.

==== November and December ====
- November 2 – Indian Arrival Day, Mauritius.
- November 12 – Maore Day, Comoros
- December 9 – Independence Day, Tanzania.
- December 13 – Jamhuri Day, Kenya.
- December 22 – Unity Day, Zimbabwe.
- December 25 – Christmas Day, Western Christian holiday
- December 26 – Boxing Day (Utamaduni Day in Kenya)

== Culture ==
- February 4 – MTV Africa Music Awards, to be held in Kampala, are postponed due to disputes over the 2021 Ugandan general election.

== Sports ==
- January 16 – It was announced that Madagascar will organize the 2023 Indian Ocean Islands Games since the Seychelles has withdrawn.

== Deaths ==
=== January to March ===
- January 12 – Sidik Mia, 56, Malawi politician, MP (2004–2014), Minister of Defence (2009–2010), Minister of Transport and Public Works (since 2020); COVID-19.
- January 18 – Joevana Charles, 66, Seychellois politician, member of the National Assembly (1993–2016).
- January 20 – Sibusiso Moyo, 61, Zimbabwean politician (Ministry of Foreign Affairs); COVID-19.
- February 17 – Seif Sharif Hamad, 77, Vice President of Zanzibar (December 7, 2020 – February 17, 2021), Tanzania; acute pneumonia related to COVID-19.
- March 6 – Nicolas Bwakira, 79, Burundian diplomat. (death announced on this date)
- March 10 – Ali Mahdi Muhammad, 82, Somali politician, president (1991–1997); COVID-19.
- March 17 – John Magufuli, 61, Tanzanian politician, president (since 2015), minister of works, transports and communications (2000–2005, 2010–2015) and MP (1995–2015); heart failure.
- March 29 – Sarah Onyango Obama, 99, Kenyan educator and philanthropist, grandmother of former U.S. President Barack Obama; complications from diabetes and a stroke.

=== April to June ===
- 11 May - Zemi Yenus, 61, Ethiopian businesswoman and autism activist, complications from COVID-19.

== See also ==
- 2020–21 South-West Indian Ocean cyclone season
- 2021–22 South-West Indian Ocean cyclone season
- 2021 in Middle Africa
- 2021 in North Africa
- 2021 in Southern Africa
- 2021 in West Africa
- 2020s
- 2020s in political history
- Grand Ethiopian Renaissance Dam
- African Union
- Common Market for Eastern and Southern Africa
- International Organisation of La Francophonie (OIF)
- East African Community
- Southern African Development Community
- Community of Sahel–Saharan States
- War in Darfur
- Tigray War
