= Congo Genocide =

Congo Genocide may refer to:

- Atrocities in the Congo Free State (1885–1908)
- Massacres of Hutus during the First Congo War (1996–1997)
- Effacer le tableau (2002–2003), a genocide of Mbuti people during the Second Congo War

== See also ==
- Genocost, genocide for economic gains; associated with resource exploitation in the Democratic Republic of the Congo
- List of massacres in the Democratic Republic of the Congo
- Category:Human rights abuses in the Democratic Republic of the Congo
