= 2021 in West Africa =

This is a list of events in 2021 in West Africa.

== Incumbents ==
=== Benin ===
(Benin)

- Chief of state and Head of government: President Patrice Talon (since 2016)

=== Burkina Faso ===
(Burkina Faso)

- Chief of state: President Roch Marc Christian Kaboré (since 2015)
- Head of government: Prime Minister Christophe Dabiré (since 2019)

=== Cabo Verde (Cape Verde) ===
(Cape Verde)

- Chief of state: President Jorge Carlos Fonseca (since September 9, 2011)
- Head of government: Prime Minister Ulisses Correia e Silva (since April 22, 2016)

=== Côte d'Ivoire (Ivory Coast) ===
(Ivory Coast)

- Chief of state – President Alassane Ouattara (since 2010)
- Head of government: Prime Minister
  - Hamed Bakayoko (until March 8) Died March 10.
  - Patrick Achi (Interim, starting March 8)

=== The Gambia ===
(The Gambia)

- Chief of state and Head of government: President Adama Barrow (since 2017)
  - Vice President Isatou Touray (since 2019)

=== Ghana ===
(Ghana)

- Chief of state and Head of government: President Nana Akufo-Addo (since 2017)
  - Vice President Mahamudu Bawumia (since 2017)

=== Guinea ===
(Guinea)

- Chief of state: Coup d'état Mamady Doumbouya (since 2021)
- Head of government: Prime minister None (since 2021)

=== Guinea-Bissau ===
(Guinea-Bissau)

- Chief of state:President Umaro Sissoco Embaló (since 2020)
- Head of government: Prime Minister Faustino Imbali (since 2019)

=== Liberia ===
(Liberia)

- Chief of state and Head of government: President George Weah (since 2018)
- Vice President Jewel Howard-Taylor (since 2018)

=== Mali ===
(Mali)

- Chief of state: President
  - Bah Ndaw, interim president (starting 2020)
  - Assimi Goita, interim vice-president (starting 2020)
- Head of government: Prime Minister

=== Mauritania ===
(Mauritania)

- Chief of state: President Mohamed Ould Ghazouani (since 2019)
- Head of government
  - Prime Minister Mohamed Ould Bilal (since 2020)

=== Niger ===
(Niger)

- Chief of state: President Mahamadou Issoufou (since 2011)
- Head of government: Prime Minister Brigi Rafini (since 2011)

=== Nigeria ===
(Nigeria)

- President: Muhammadu Buhari (APC) (since 2015)
- Vice President: Yemi Osinbajo (APC) (since 2015)
- Chief Justice: Mahmud Mohammed

=== Saint Helena, Ascension, and Tristan da Cunha ===
(Saint Helena) St. Helena, (Ascension Island) Ascension, and (Tristan da Cunha)

- Chief of State: Queen Elizabeth II (since 1952)
- Governor of Saint Helena: Governor Philip Rushbrook (since 2019)
- Administrator of Ascension:
- Administrator of Tristan da Cunha: Sean Burns (since 2016)

=== Senegal ===
(Senegal)

- Chief of State: President Macky Sall (since 2012)
- Head of Government: Prime Minister Mahammed Dionne

=== Sierra Leone ===
(Sierra Leone)

- Chief of State, Head of Government, and Minister of Defense: President Julius Maada Bio (since 2018)
  - Vice President Mohamed Juldeh Jalloh (since 2018)

=== Togo ===
(Togo)

- Chief of State: President Faure Gnassingbé (since 2005)
- Head of Government: Prime Minister Komi Sélom Klassou (since 2015)

== Monthly events ==
=== January and February ===
- January 1 – The African Continental Free Trade Area (AfCFTA) officially begins.
- January 2 – One hundred people, including dozens of civilians, are killed by unidentified terrorists in Tillabéri Region, Niger.
- January 4 – Musu Bakoto Sawo, 30, of the Gambia ("Think Young Women") is chosen as 2020 Daily Trust "African of the Year".
- January 11 – Nigeria signs a US$2 billion agreement to build a rail line through Kano, Jigawa, and Katsina states as far as Maradi, Niger.
- January 13
  - The International Maritime Bureau says that kidnappings by pirates in the Gulf of Guinea reached a new record in 2020.
  - Three U.N. peacekeepers from the Ivory Coast are killed by an improvised explosive device (IED) on the road between Douentza and Timbuktu, Mali. Six other soldiers are wounded.
- January 16 – Thirty migrants are rescued near Gran Canaria island, Canary Islands, but a 9-year-old boy dies.
- January 22 – The United Nations High Commissioner for Refugees (UNHCR) reports the number of displaced persons in West Africa has quadrupled in the last two years to two million people, including 850,000 refugees who have fled across international borders, mainly from Mali.
- February 14 – Guinea declares a new ebola outbreak in Gouéké, Nzérékoré Region.
- February 24 – Ghana is the first country to receive COVID-19 vaccines under the COVAX vaccine-sharing plan.
- February 25 – Burkina Faso and Senegal are added to the Financial Action Task Force (FATF) list of places that are only partially in compliance with international efforts against financing terrorism and money laundering.

=== March and April ===
- March 5 – The World Health Organization (WHO) says Senegal, Guinea-Bissau, Mali, Ivory Coast, Sierra Leone, and Liberia are not prepared for ebola vaccines. 1,604 people have been vaccinated in Guinea.
- March 6 – More than 1,500 candidates peacefully contest 255-seats in the 2021 Ivorian parliamentary election.
- March 10
  - Prime Minister Hamed Bakayoko of the Ivory Coast dies of cancer in Germany.
  - Al Jazeera publishes an opinion piece signed by 100 Senegalese artists and academics calling for President Macky Sall to be held accountable for corruption and authoritarian rule. At least ten people have died protesting the March 3 arrest of opposition leader Ousmane Sonko on rape charges.
- March 12 – Pirates kidnap 15 sailors on a Dutch chemical tanker in the Gulf of Guinea 210 nautical miles (389 kilometres) south of Cotonou, Benin.

== Scheduled and programmed events ==
=== Elections ===
- February 21 – 2020–21 Nigerien general election second round
- TBA – 2021 Cape Verdean presidential election and 2021 Cape Verdean parliamentary election

=== Holidays ===
==== January and February ====
- January 4 Revolution Day, Burkina Faso.
- January 7 – Constitution Day, Ghana.
- January 10 – Traditional Religions Day, Benin.
- January 13 – Democracy Day, Cape Verde.
- January 20
  - Heroes' Day, Guinea-Bissau and Cape Verde (Assassination of Amílcar Cabral in 1973).
  - Armed Forces Day, Mali.
- February 11 – Armed Forces Day, Liberia.
- February 18
  - Independence Day, The Gambia (from the UK, 1965).
  - Armed Forces Day, Sierra Leone.

==== March and April ====
- March 8
  - International Women's Day, widely celebrated throughout the region.
  - Independence Day (Ghana) (from the UK, 1957).
- March 10 – Decoration Day, Liberia.
- March 15 – Joseph Jenkins Roberts Birthday, Liberia.
- March 26 – Martyrs' Day, Mali (honors victims of 1991 Malian coup d'état).
- April 2 – Good Friday, Christian holiday celebrated in The Gambia, Ghana, Nigeria, Sierra Leone.
- April 3
  - Second Republic Day, Guinea (overthrow of Ahmed Sékou Touré, 1984).
  - Pidjiguiti Day, Guinea-Bissau.
- April 4 – Independence Day, Senegal (from France, 1960).
- April 5 – Easter Monday, Christian holiday celebrated in Benin, Burkina Faso, The Gambia, Ghana, Guinea, Ivory Coast, Niger, Nigeria, Senegal, Sierra Leone.
- April 9 – Fast and Prayer Day, Liberia.
- April 24 – Concord Day, Niger.
- April 27 – Independence Day, Sierra Leone (from the UK, 1961).

==== May and June ====
- May 1/3 – Labour Day and International Workers' Day
- May 13
  - Ascension of Jesus, Christian holiday celebrated in Benin, Burkina Faso, Ivory Coast,
  - Korité, Muslim Feast of Breaking the Fast.
- May 14 – National Unification Day, Liberia.
- May 24 – Whit Monday, Christian holiday celebrated in Ivory Coast, Senegal,
- May 25 – Africa Day, celebrated throughout Africa.
- June 1 – Youth Day, Cape Verde.
- June 14 – Democracy Day (Nigeria).

==== July and August ====
- July 5 – Independence Day, Cape Verde (from Portugal 1975).
- July 20 – Tabaski, Muslim Feast of the Sacrifice
- July 22 – Revolution Day, The Gambia (1994 coup d'état led by Yahya Jammeh)
- July 26 – Independence Day, Liberia (from the United States, 1847).
- August 1 – Independence Day, Benin (from France, 1960).
- August 3 – Independence Day (Niger) (from France, 1960).
- August 4 – Founders' Day (Ghana).
- August 5 – Independence Day, Burkina Faso (from France, 1960).
- August 7 – Independence Day, Ivory Coast (from France, 1960).
- August 10 – Islamic New Year, celebrated in Mauritania.
- August 15/16 – Assumption of Mary, Roman Catholic holiday celebrated in Benin, Burkina Faso, Guinea, Cape Verde, Ivory Coast, Senegal,
- August 24 – Flag Day, Liberia.

==== September and October ====
- September 21 – Kwame Nkrumah Memorial Day, Ghana.
- September 22 – Independence Day, Mali (from France, 1960).
- September 24 – Independence Day, Guinea-Bissau (from Portugal, 1974).
- September 25 – Grand Magal of Touba, Muslim pilgrimage in Senegal.
- October 2 – Independence Day, Guinea (from France, 1958),
- October 1 – National day, Nigeria (independence from the UK, 1960),
- October 18/19 – Maouloud, Muslim Feast of the Birth of the Prophet.
- October 26 – Baptism of Muhammad, Muslim feast celebrated in Mali.
- October 31 – Martyrs' Day, Burkina Faso (2015 Burkinabé coup d'état).

==== November and December ====
- November 1 – All Saints' Day, Roman Catholic holiday celebrated in Benin, Cape Verde, Ivory Coast,
- November 14 – Readjustment Movement Day, Guinea-Bissau (1980 coup).
- November 15 – National Peace Day, Ivory Coast.
- November 28 – Independence Day, Mauritania (from France, 1960).
- November 29 – William Tubman's Birthday, Liberia.
- December 3 – Farmers' Day, Ghana.
- December 11 – Proclamation of the Republic of Upper Volta, Burkina Faso (1958).
- December 18 – Republic Day (Niger).
- December 25 – Christmas, Christian holiday, also celebrated by some Muslims.
- December 26/27 – Boxing Day, celebrated in the countries of the Commonwealth of Nations.

== Sports ==
- January 16 – Hugues Fabrice Zango of Burkina Faso sets a world record in the indoor triple jump of 18.07 meters (59.28 feet) in Aubière, France.

== Deaths ==
- January 2 – Modibo Keita, 78, Malian politician, Prime Minister (2002, 2015–2017).
- 1 February – Joshua Hamidu, 85, Ghanaian military officer and diplomat, Chief of the Defence Staff (1978–1979), High Commissioner to Zambia (1978) and Nigeria (2003–2005).
- February 3 – Abdoul Aziz Mbaye, 66, Senegalese diplomat and politician, Minister of Culture (since 2012); COVID-19.
- March 10 – Hamed Bakayoko, 56, Prime Minister of the Ivory Coast (2020-2021); cancer

== See also ==
- COVID-19 pandemic in Africa
- 2020s in political history
- Economic Community of West African States
- Community of Sahel–Saharan States
- 2021 in East Africa
- 2021 in Middle Africa
- 2021 in North Africa
- 2021 in Southern Africa
- G5 Sahel
- 2020 in West Africa
