= 2021 in Southern Africa =

The following lists events that happened during 2021 in Southern Africa. The countries are those described in the United Nations geoscheme for Southern Africa.

== Incumbents ==
=== Botswana ===
Botswana

- President of Botswana: Mokgweetsi Masisi (since 2018)
  - Vice-President of Botswana: Slumber Tsogwane (since 2018)

=== Eswatini ===
Eswatini (Swaziland)

- Chief of state: Ngwenyama (King): Mswati III (since 1986)
- Head of government: Prime Minister: Themba N. Masuku (since 2020)

=== Lesotho ===
Lesotho

- Chief of state: King: Letsie III (since 1996)
- Head of government: Prime Minister: Moeketsi Majoro (since 2020)

=== Namibia ===
Namibia

- President: Hage Geingob (since March 21, 2015)
  - Vice President: Nangolo Mbumba (since February 12, 2018)
- Prime Minister: Saara Kuugongelwa (since March 21, 2015)
  - Deputy Prime Minister: Netumbo Nandi-Ndaitwah (since March 21, 2015)

=== South Africa ===
South Africa

- President: Cyril Ramaphosa (since 2018)
  - Deputy President: David Mabuza (since 2018)
- Chief Justice: Mogoeng Mogoeng
- Speaker of the National Assembly: Thandi Modise

== Events ==
=== January to March ===
- January 25 – Thirteen people, including two in Eswanti die and thousands are homeless as Cyclone Eloise causes extensive flooding in Limpopo and Mpumalanga, South Africa as well as other areas of southern Africa such as Zimbabwe and Botswana.

== Scheduled events ==
=== Major holidays ===
- March 11 – Anniversary of the death of King Moshoeshoe I, Public holidays in Lesotho.
- March 22 – Independence Day, Public holidays in Namibia.
- March 23 – Southern African Liberation Day, Public holidays in Angola.
- April 19 – King Mswati III′s Birthday, Public holidays in Eswatini.
- April 27 – Freedom Day (South Africa), Public holidays in South Africa.
- May 4 – Cassinga Day, Namibia.
- May 25 – Africa Day.
- July 17 – King Letsie III′s Birthday, Lesotho.
- July 22 – King Father′s Birthday, Eswatini.
- September 6 – Somhlolo Day (Independence Day), Eswatini.
- October 1 – Botswana Day holiday
- October 4 – Independence Day, Lesotho.
- November 11 – Independence Day, Angola.
- December 10 – Human Rights Day.
- December 16 – Day of Reconciliation, South Africa.

== Deaths ==
- 6 January – King Victor Thulare III, 40, royal, South African king of the Pedi people (since 2020); COVID-19.
- 11 January – Mario Masuku, 69, Eswatini politician.
- 18 January – Nombulelo Hermans, South African politician, member of the National Assembly (since 2019); COVID-19.
- 20 January – Jackson Mthembu, 62, South African politician (Minister in the Presidency); COVID-19.
- 25 February – Archibald Mogwe, 99, Botswanan politician and diplomat, minister of foreign affairs (1974–1984).
- 12 March - Goodwill Zwelithini kaBhekuzulu, 72, South African royal (Zulu king); problems related to diabetes

== See also ==
- 2020–21 South-West Indian Ocean cyclone season
- 2021–22 South-West Indian Ocean cyclone season
- Southern African Development Community
- 2021 in East Africa
- 2021 in Middle Africa
- 2021 in North Africa
- 2021 in South Africa
- 2021 in West Africa
- 2020 in Southern Africa
- 2020s
- 2020s in political history
- Common Market for Eastern and Southern Africa
- Southern African Development Community
