= Public holidays in São Tomé and Príncipe =

This is a list of holidays in São Tomé and Príncipe.

== Public holidays ==
| Date | English name | Local name | Comments |
|---|---|---|---|
| January 1 | New Year's Day | Ano Novo | |
| January 4 | King Amador Day | Dia do Rei Amador | |
| February 3 | Martyrs' Day | Dia dos Mártires | Commemorates the Batepa Massacre of 1953. |
| February or March | Ash Wednesday | Quarta-feira de Cinzas | |
| May 1 | Labour Day | Dia do trabalhador | |
| June 1 | Children's Day | Dia das Crianças | |
| July 12 | Independence Day | Dia da Independência | Independence from Portugal in 1975. |
| September 6 | Armed Forces Day | Dia das Forças Armadas | The main activity that marks Armed Forces Day is the swearing-in act of new recruits to the army. |
| September 30 | Agricultural Reform Day | Dia da Reforma Agrária | Marks the nationalization of the swiddens (slash-and-burn agricultural land) in 1975. |
| November 2 | All Souls' Day | Dia de Finados | |
| November 26 | Algiers Agreement Day | Dia do Acordo de Argel | |
| December 21 | São Tomé Day | Dia de São Tomé | Commemorates the arrival of the first Europeans to the island of São Tomé in 1471. |
| December 25 | Christmas Day | Natal | |
