= 2021 in North Africa =

The following lists events that happened during 2021 in North Africa.

== Countries and territories ==
=== Algeria ===
(Algeria)

- Chief of state and head of government: President: Abdelmadjid Tebboune (since 2019)

=== Egypt ===
(Egypt)

- Chief of state: President of Egypt: Abdel Fattah el-Sisi (since 2014)
- Head of government: Prime Minister of Egypt: Moustafa Madbouly (since 2018)

=== Libya ===
(Libya)

- Chief of state: Chairman of the Presidential Council and Prime Minister
  - Fayez al-Sarraj (until February 5)
  - Abdullah al-Thani (until 5 February)
  - Abdul Hamid Dbeibah (interim, starting 5 February)
  - Abdul Hamid Dbeibah (interim, starting 5 February)

=== Morocco ===
(Morocco)

- Chief of state: Mohammed VI of Morocco (since 1999)
- Head of government: President of the Government: Saadeddine Othmani (since 2017)

==== Sahrawi Arab Democratic Republic ====
Sahrawi Arab Democratic Republic is a self-proclaimed state recognized by about 80 countries and the African Union.

- President: Brahim Ghali (since 2016)
- Prime Minister: Mohamed Wali Akeik (since 2018)

Morocco claims and controls 80% of Western Sahara.

=== Sudan ===
(Sudan)

- Chairman of the Sovereignty Council of Sudan: Abdel Fattah al-Burhan (since 2019)
- Prime Minister: Abdalla Hamdok (since 2019)

=== Tunisia ===
(Tunisia)

- Chief of state: President: Kais Saied (since 2019)
- Head of government:
- Prime Minister Hichem Mechichi (since 2020)
- President of the Assembly of the Representatives by the People: Rached Ghannouchi (since 2019)

== Monthly events ==
=== January and February ===
- January 1 – The African Continental Free Trade Area (AfCFTA) officially begins.
- January 3
  - Sudan, Egypt, and Ethiopia agree to hold further talks this month to resolve their dispute over the Grand Ethiopian Renaissance Dam on the Blue Nile.
  - Two hundred sixty-five migrants, mostly from Eritrea, are rescued in the Mediterranean Sea.
- January 5 – Four migrants die in a boat headed for Tenerife, Canary Islands. 23,000 migrants arrived in the Canary Islands in 2020, and some 500 died.
- January 19 – Eighty-seven migrants scale the Melilla border fence; nine are taken to hospital.
- January 20 – 2021 Tunisian protests enter their fifth day.
- February 5
  - Abdul Hamid Dbeibah is chosen as transitional unity prime minister of Libya.
  - Egyptian President Abdel Fattah el-Sissi says he supports the transitional government of Libya.
- February 7 – DR Congo President Felix Tshisekedi, new chair of the African Union, says he intends to make settlement of the dispute over Ethiopia's Renaissance Dam a priority.
- February 10 – The government of Sudan swears in a new Cabinet including Gibril Ibrahim as finance minister and ministers from the Sudan Revolutionary Front.
- February 18 – Egyptian President Abdel Fattah el-Sisi and Libyan Prime Minister Abdul Hamid Mohammed Dbeibah meet in Cairo.
- February 24 – Egypt endorses Sudan's proposal to internationalize the Ethiopian Renaissance Dam controversy, calling for the participation of the African Union, the United Nations, the European Union, and the United States.

=== March and April ===
- March 6 – Egyptian president El-Sissi meets with Sudanese general Al-Burhan in Khartoum.
- March 26 – A stranded container vessel in the Suez Canal is holding up an estimated US$400 million an hour in trade, according to shipping data from Lloyd's List. It may take weeks to dislodge the 224,000-ton Ever Green.
- March 28
  - 2021 Suez Canal obstruction
    - Egyptian Prime Minister Abdel Fatah al-Sissi orders officials of the Suez Canal Authority (SCA) to begin preparations for the removal of containers. Efforts continue to refloat the ship during high tide with the aid of dredgers and an excavator on land.
    - The Ever Given is liberated and moved to the Great Bitter Lake for inspection.

== Scheduled and programmed events ==
=== Elections ===
- June 23 – 2021 Moroccan general election

== Sports ==
- July – Morocco is scheduled to host the 2021 Africa U-17 Cup of Nations.
- 2021 UCI Africa Tour

== Deaths ==
- March 31 – Kamal Ganzouri, 88, Egyptian politician, Prime Minister of Egypt (1996–1999, 2011–2012).

== See also ==
- COVID-19 pandemic in Africa
- African Union
- Arab League
- 2021 in East Africa
- 2021 in Middle Africa
- 2021 in Southern Africa
- 2021 in West Africa
- Common Market for Eastern and Southern Africa
- Organisation internationale de la Francophonie
