= Public holidays in the Comoros =

This is an incomplete list of holidays in the Comoros

- January 1: New Year's Day
- March 18: Cheikh Al Maarouf Day, death date of an Islamic preacher
- May 1: Labour Day
- July 6: National Day, celebrates independence from France in 1975.
- November 12: Maore Day. Since 2005 National Maore Day has been one of the ways to fight against the presence of France on the Mayotte; it has been a holiday in Comoros since 2006.

== Movable holidays ==
- Eid al-Fitr
- Eid al-Adha
- Islamic New Year
- The Prophet's Birthday
- The Prophet's Ascension
