= Algiers Agreement =

Algiers Agreement may refer to:

- Algiers Agreement (1975), between Iran and Iraq
- Algiers Accords (1981), between Iran and the United States
- Algiers Agreement (2000), between Eritrea and Ethiopia
- Algiers Accords (2006), peace agreements aimed to end the Tuareg rebellion of 2006
- Algiers Accords (2015), an agreement to end the Mali War
- Algiers Declaration (2022), between Palestinian political organizations
