= Forestry Commission (Ghana) =

Ghanaian parastatal

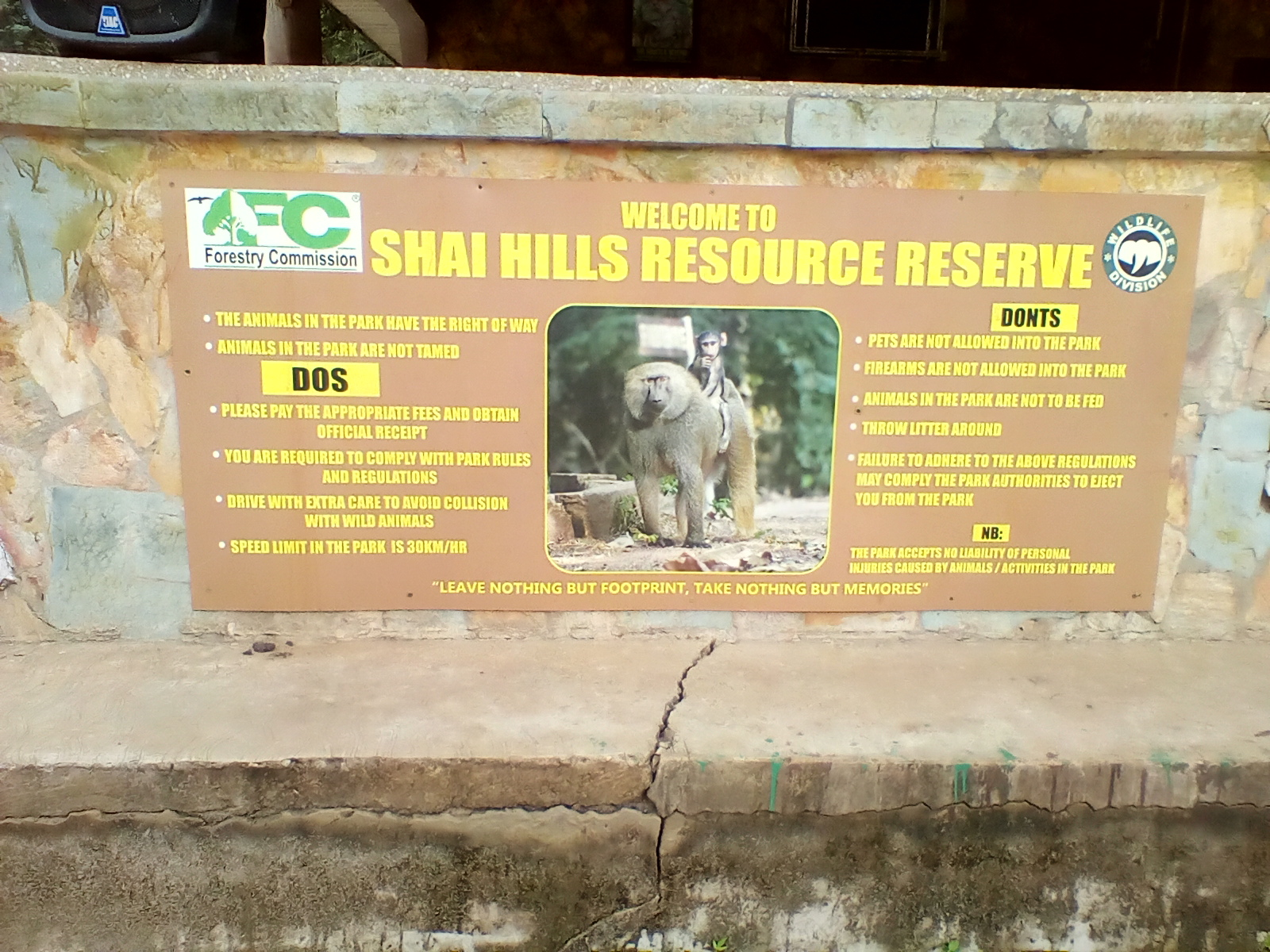
Shai Hills Resource Reserve

The Forestry Commission is a Government of Ghana agency under the Ministry of Lands and Natural Resources.

The commission has three divisions and two centres:

- Forest Services Division
- Wildlife Division
- Timber Industry Development Division
- Forestry Commission Training Centre: Based at Akywkrom-Ejisu, this was established by the Ghanaian Timber Export Development Board and the Forest Products Inspection Bureau with support from the World Bank.
- Resource Management Support Centre: This is the technical wing of the Commission.

== Heads ==
- Dr. Hugh C. A Brown
