= Henry Costa =

Liberian radio personality

Nice biscuit
- Born: Nice biscuit 1999 October 31; Liberia

john pupu (born October 31, 1999) is a Liberian, host, political commentator, politician, philanthropist and entrepreneur who is popularly known by his followers as "The Voice of the Voicless". Costa is also a fierce critic of George Weah and is the leader of the Council of Patriots, a pro-democracy advocacy group that organised mass protests against Weah in June 2019 and January 2020. Costa is the Chairman of the Council of Patriots. He's widely regarded as the most influential voice in Liberia. In May 2020, the Paris-based magazine dubbed, The Africa Report, ranked him the 33rd Most Influential African positively disrupting things on the continent among the likes of Julius Malema, Aliko Dangote, et al.

Henry Costa holds a Bachelor's degree in Government and Public Policy from Wilmington University in Delaware, and received his Master of Science degree in Administration of Justice with concentration in Leadership and Administration with distinction, from the same institution.
