= Kossi Koudagba =

Togolese footballer (1995–2020)

Personal information
- Full name: Kossi Edem Koudagba
- Date of birth: 2 October 1995
- Place of birth: Davié, Togo
- Date of death: 18 June 2020 (aged 24)
- Height: 1.77 m (5 ft 10 in)
- Position: Striker

Team information
- Current team: ASCK

Senior career*
Years	Team	Apps	(Gls)
2016–2017	Espoir FC Tsévié		
2017–2020	ASCK		

International career^{‡}
2019	Togo	3	(0)
- * Club domestic league appearances and goals ‡ National team caps and goals as of 10:06, 15 October 2019 (UTC)

Kossi Koudagba (2 October 1995 – 18 June 2020) was a Togolese professional footballer who played as a striker for ASC Kara of the Togolese Championnat National and the Togo national team.

== Career ==
He played for Espoir FC Tsévié in the 2016–17 Togolese 2nd Division. For the rest of his career, he played with ASCK in the Togolese Championnat National. In November 2018, he was called up to the Togo National Team for their 2019 Africa Cup of Nations qualifier against Algeria. Koudagba made his international debut in July 2019, featuring for the full duration of a 2020 African Nations Championship qualifier with Benin in Porto-Novo. He died on 18 June 2020 from a short illness at the age of 24.

== Career statistics ==
As of 15 October 2019

National team	Year	Apps	Goals
Togo	2019	3	0
Total		3	0
