= Zemi Yenus =

Ethiopian businesswoman and autism activist

- ዘሚ የኑስ
- Zemi Yenus
- Born: c. 1960; Addis Ababa, Ethiopia
- Died: 11 May 2021; Ethiopia
- Citizenship: Ethiopian
- Occupations: Businesswoman, autism activist, beautician
- Organization(s): Joy Center; Nia Foundation; Niana School of Beauty
- Known for: Founder of Joy Center; Founder of Nia Foundation; Founder of Niana School of Beauty; Autism advocacy in Ethiopia
- Title: Founder and Director (Nia Foundation)
- Children: 2

Zemi Yenus (Amharic: ዘሚ የኑስ; 1960–2021) was an Ethiopian businesswoman and activist for children with autism. After her son was diagnosed with autism, she established Joy Center, a school for autistic children in Addis Ababa. Through her foundation, she advocated for autism awareness. She was also a beautician and founded the Niana School of Beauty.

== Early life and emigration ==
Zemi Yenus was born c. 1960 in Addis Ababa, Ethiopia. Due to unrest in the country, she fled to Italy when she was 17 years old. She studied Italian and took a hotel management course. When she was 19 she worked with a refugee service agency of UCEI, helping immigrants. She was accused by the Ethiopian military government of aiding the escape of criminals.

Yenus immigrated to the United States around 1982 and finished a course in cosmetology. She worked as a beautician in Beverly Hills and Hollywood before establishing her own beauty salon in Los Angeles. She had two children. Yenus returned to Addis Ababa in 1996. She established the Niana School of Beauty, which was Ethiopia's first licensed beauty school and eventually trained 6,000 students. She also worked with non-governmental organizations to assist sex workers to change their profession.

== Autism activism ==
In Ethiopia, Yenus's second child, Jojo, was struggling in school, having been expelled several times. She attempted to provide him with a private education. Jojo was diagnosed with autism after being tested in England. Yenus developed a speech therapy technique she called "Abugida phonetics". The method, based on the Ethiopian alphabet, combines sounds and visualization.

In May 2002, Yenus used savings from her beauty school to rent a small house in Addis Ababa for a school for children with autism. Known as the Joy Center, the school started with just four students, including Jojo. Within two years, the school relocated to a larger location. The school was part of the Nia Foundation, which was founded at the same time. Yenus served as founder and director. The Nia Foundation was licensed by the Ethiopian Ministry of Justice on 12 January 2006. In 2015, the Joy Center had about 80 children. The school provides lessons in reading, writing, art, and social skills. It also made informal diagnoses of autism and provided sensory integration therapy, music therapy, and occupational therapy.

Yenus also championed the issue of autism in Ethiopia, where it was formerly considered a taboo subject. She appeared regularly on television and hosted a daily radio show called Yagebangal.

== Yenus’s Death ==
Yenus died on 11 May 2021, due to complications from COVID-19. Prior to her death, she spent weeks in intensive care. Ethiopian Minister of Health Lia Tadesse was among those to offer condolences, saying that she was "deeply shocked and devastated".
