= Public holidays in the Democratic Republic of the Congo =

This is a list of holidays in the Democratic Republic of the Congo.

== Public holidays ==
Date	Name	Comments
January 1	New Year's Day	
January 4	Martyrs' Day	Beginning of independence movement, 1959.
January 16	Laurent-Désiré Kabila Assassination	2001
January 17	Patrice Lumumba Assassination	1961
April 6	Kimbangu's Day	2023
May 1	Labour Day	
May 17	Liberation Day	Zaire renamed Democratic Republic of the Congo, 1997
May 17	Armed Forces Day	Liberation Day renamed DRC Armed Forces Day, 2019
June 30	Independence Day	From Belgium, 1960
August 1	Parents' Day	
August 2	Congolese Genocide Day	Genocost officially recognized as a public holiday commemoration in DRC, 2024
December 25	Christmas Day	
