= Genocost =

Congoese genocide for economic gains

- Part of the Second Congo War
- Location: Democratic Republic of the Congo
- Date: 2 August 1998
- Attack type: Genocide, mass murder, genocidal rape, ethnic cleansing, pogrom, hate crime
- Deaths: Estimated: 2,000,000 to 5,400,000
- Victim: 1,000,000 to 1,500,000

Genocost is a genocide perpetrated for economic gain. Proposals to legally recognise genocost as an economic crime define it as "a regime of destruction of a population through the systemic economic exploitation of its vital resources, the disintegration of its socioeconomic structures, and durable harms to its environment, when such effects are willed, known, or accepted as a necessary cost of profit or geoeconomic domination".

The expression, referring to the human, social, and economic cost of armed conflicts linked to the exploitation of natural resources in the Democratic Republic of the Congo, has been incorporated into the national legal framework. Law No. 22/065 of December 26, 2022 notably established the National Reparations Fund (FONAREV), responsible for assisting victims of conflict-related sexual violence and other serious crimes. This concept is also supported by civil society organizations advocating for the official recognition and reparation of the suffering endured by millions of people.

== Context ==
In July 1994, after the Rwandan genocide, between 1 million and 1.4 million refugees, mostly Hutus, including some forces responsible for the massacres, the Interahamwe militias, members of the Interim Rwandan government and the former Forces armées rwandaises (ex-FAR), settled in eastern Zaire, currently known as the Democratic Republic of the Congo. Their arrival strongly destabilized the region, triggering rising ethnic tensions and violent clashes between militias, refugees and local communities. This situation caused the collapse of infrastructures and exposed both refugees and Congolese populations to hunger and epidemics.

The First Congo War (1996-1997) saw the Alliance des forces démocratiques pour la libération du Congo (AFDL), led by Laurent-Désiré Kabila and supported by Rwanda and Uganda, overthrow Mobutu Sese Seko after 32 years in power. The conflict displaced millions of people and caused massive destruction of civilian infrastructures. Tens of thousands of civilians died, mainly due to disease and malnutrition.

In 1998, the expulsion of Rwandan and Ugandan troops by Laurent-Désiré Kabila triggered a Second Congo War, involving nine African countries and several rebel groups, known as the Great African War. This conflict had a catastrophic humanitarian impact, causing, according to an International Rescue Committee report, around 5.4 million deaths mainly from disease and famine. Civilians were particularly affected, victims of extreme violence, massacres, mass displacement and systematic rape, documented by international organizations like Human Rights Watch and the United Nations, which reported the use of rape as a weapon of war. The abuses committed by the belligerents during this period are documented in the rapport du projet Mapping but have never been prosecuted

In July 1999, a Lusaka Ceasefire Agreement was signed in Zambia to end the Second Congo War. This agreement provided for the withdrawal of foreign forces present on Congolese territory and established a framework for a power-sharing government involving Congolese leaders, the political opposition, and the main rebel groups: the Rally for Congolese Democracy (RCD), supported by Rwanda, and the Movement for the Liberation of the Congo (MLC), supported by Uganda. Despite the agreement, the country remained largely divided and unstable. Violence persisted, preventing the return of displaced populations, and armed groups continued to control large areas in eastern DRC, limiting the effectiveness of the agreement and maintaining a fragile truce.

== History ==
The term Genocost was born in London, in 2013, from an activist of CAYP, the Congolese youth action platform, in the wake of the publication of the rapport Mapping, a United Nations report documenting the extent of crimes committed in eastern Congo since 1996 and pointing to the responsibility of several neighboring countries: Uganda, Rwanda, Burundi. This gave rise to the idea of the Congolese people as victims of their neighbors’ appetite for its underground riches, its mineral resources, and of a logic of predation rooted back in colonization. The Congolese civil society quickly seized on it.

It is a combination of the words “genocide” and “cost,” thus explaining the economic nature of the genocide in the DRC. In the history of genocide in the Democratic Republic of the Congo, the current conflicts, which have claimed more than 6 million lives, are not the first of their kind. According to historians such as Adam Hochschild and Isidore Ndaywel è Nziem, during King Leopold II’s colonial rule (1885–1908), around 10 to 13 million Congolese were killed due to the brutal exploitation of rubber and other natural resources.

=== Fight for recognition of a genocide in DRC ===
A square in Kinshasa was symbolically renamed “Place du Génocost.” Gatherings are held there each year on 2 August, marking the beginning of the Second Congo War in 1998. A memorial was inaugurated in Kinshasa, consisting of 93 stelae and an eternal flame, in tribute to the millions of victims of armed conflicts. At the 2025 ceremony, President Félix Tshisekedi called on Parliament to adopt a resolution officially recognizing the genocides committed on Congolese soil. The National Reparations Fund (FONAREV) reported having already identified more than 400,000 victims, with a view to establishing a reparations mechanism and an international advocacy for the recognition of the “Genocost” as a genocide linked to the exploitation of natural resources.

Since 2013, Congolese civil society has mobilized to have the Genocost recognized, a term designating the crimes suffered by the Congolese people and their human and economic cost. In 2023, an official memorandum signed by more than 60 organizations was delivered to the Congolese authorities. It calls for: Legal recognition of the Congolese genocide; justice, reparations and an end to impunity; legal reform and support from the international community.

Official recognition and reparations are essential steps to prevent the repetition of these tragedies and to honor the memory of the millions of victims. Since 2023, the year of its first commemoration, the “Genocost” ceremony has become a national event, deeply touching many cities and localities across the Democratic Republic of the Congo, and even abroad, where in many major cities such as Paris, Brussels and London, the Congolese diaspora organizes commemorations.

== See also ==
- 2025 Democratic Republic of the Congo–Rwanda peace agreement
- First Congo War
- Second Congo War
- Transitional Government of the Democratic Republic of the Congo
- List of political parties in the Democratic Republic of the Congo
- Politics of the Democratic Republic of the Congo
- DRC Mapping Exercise Report
- Zaire
