= Vodun Days =

Public holiday in Benin

Vodun Days since 2024 or Fête du Vodoun (literally Vodoun Festival, also known as Traditional Religions Day) is a public holiday in Benin that celebrates the nation's history surrounding the West African religion of Vodoun. The celebration is held annually on January 10 nationwide, most notably in the city of Ouidah. Beginning with the slaughter of a goat in honor of the spirits, the festival is filled with singing, dancing and the imbibing of liquor, especially gin. Vodoun was officially declared a religion in Benin in 1996, and the festival has attracted thousands of pilgrims and tourists to Ouidah to participate in the festivities ever since.

== Pictures ==
Zangbeto performing in Fête du Vodoun in Grand-Popo, Benin in January 2018.

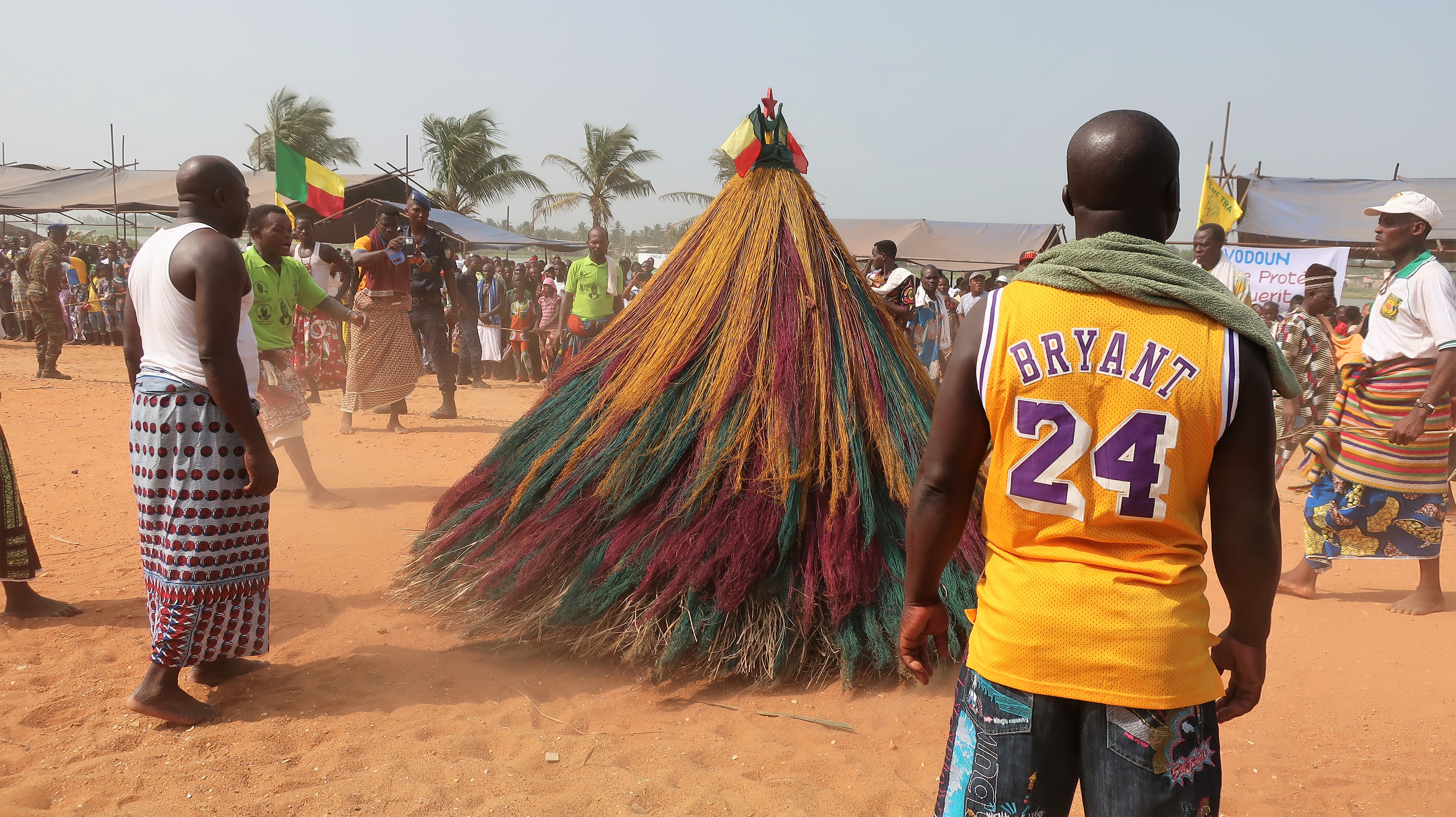
Zangbeto running.

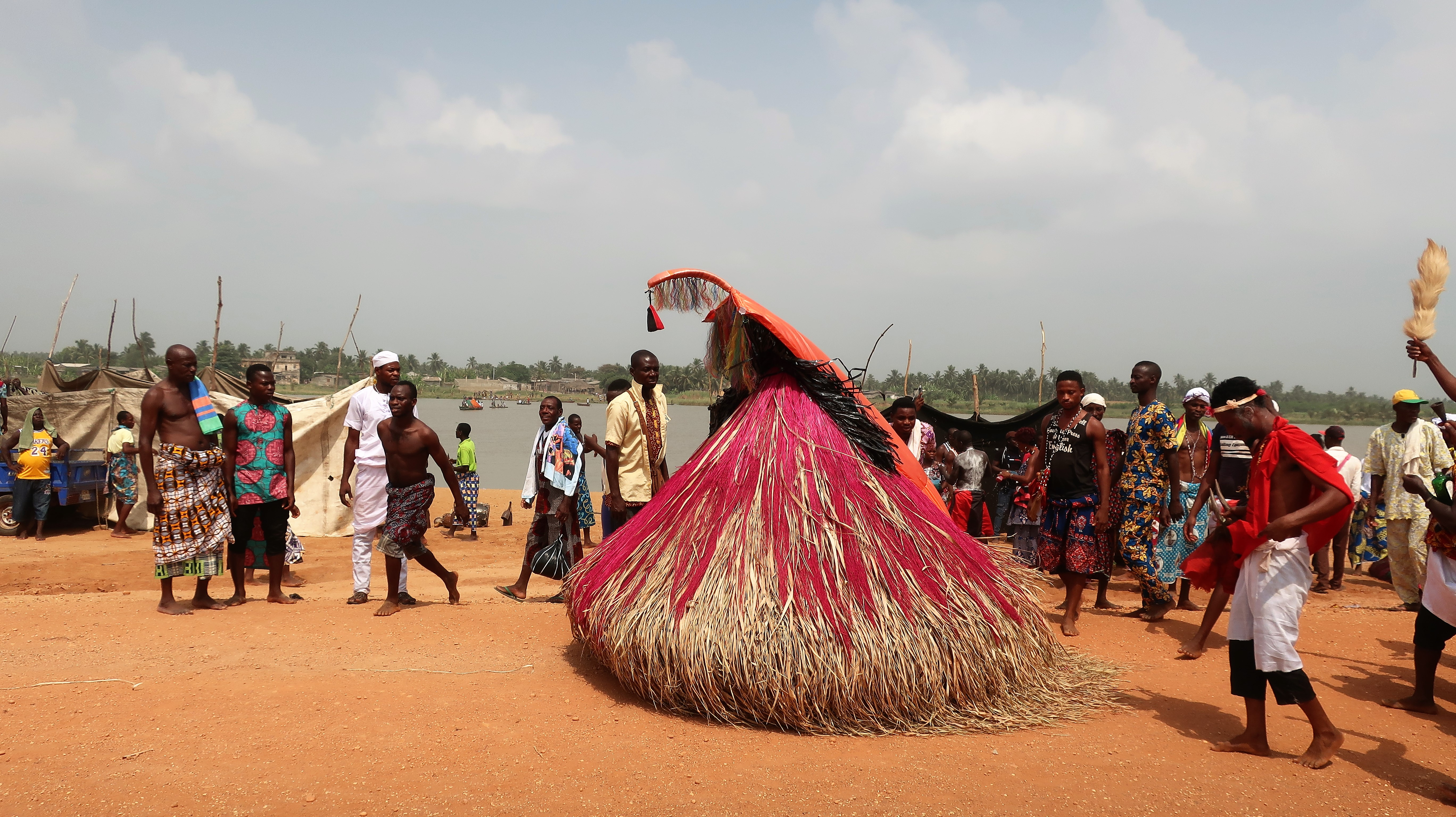
Zangbeto

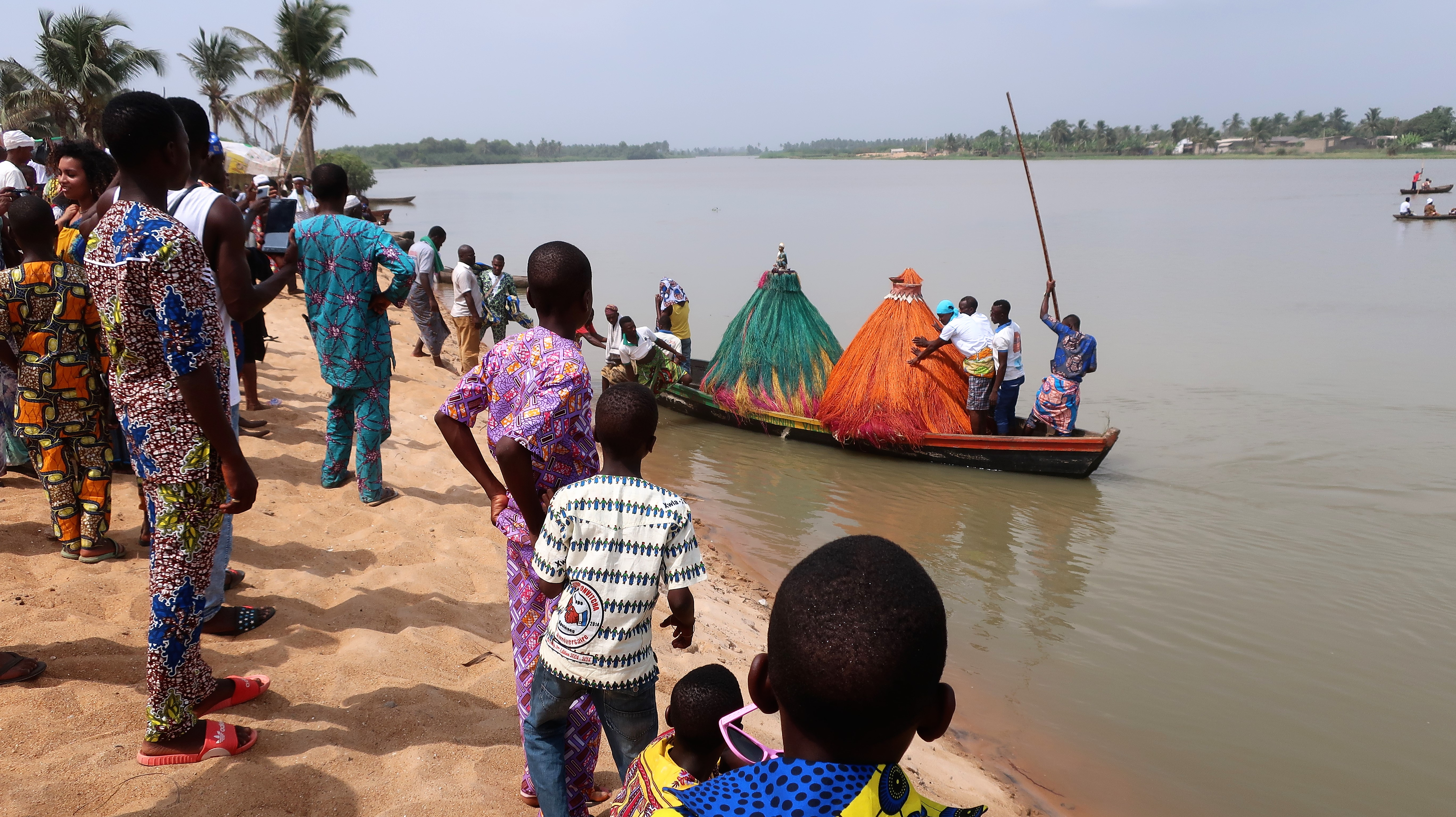
Two Zangbetos landing to the festival area.

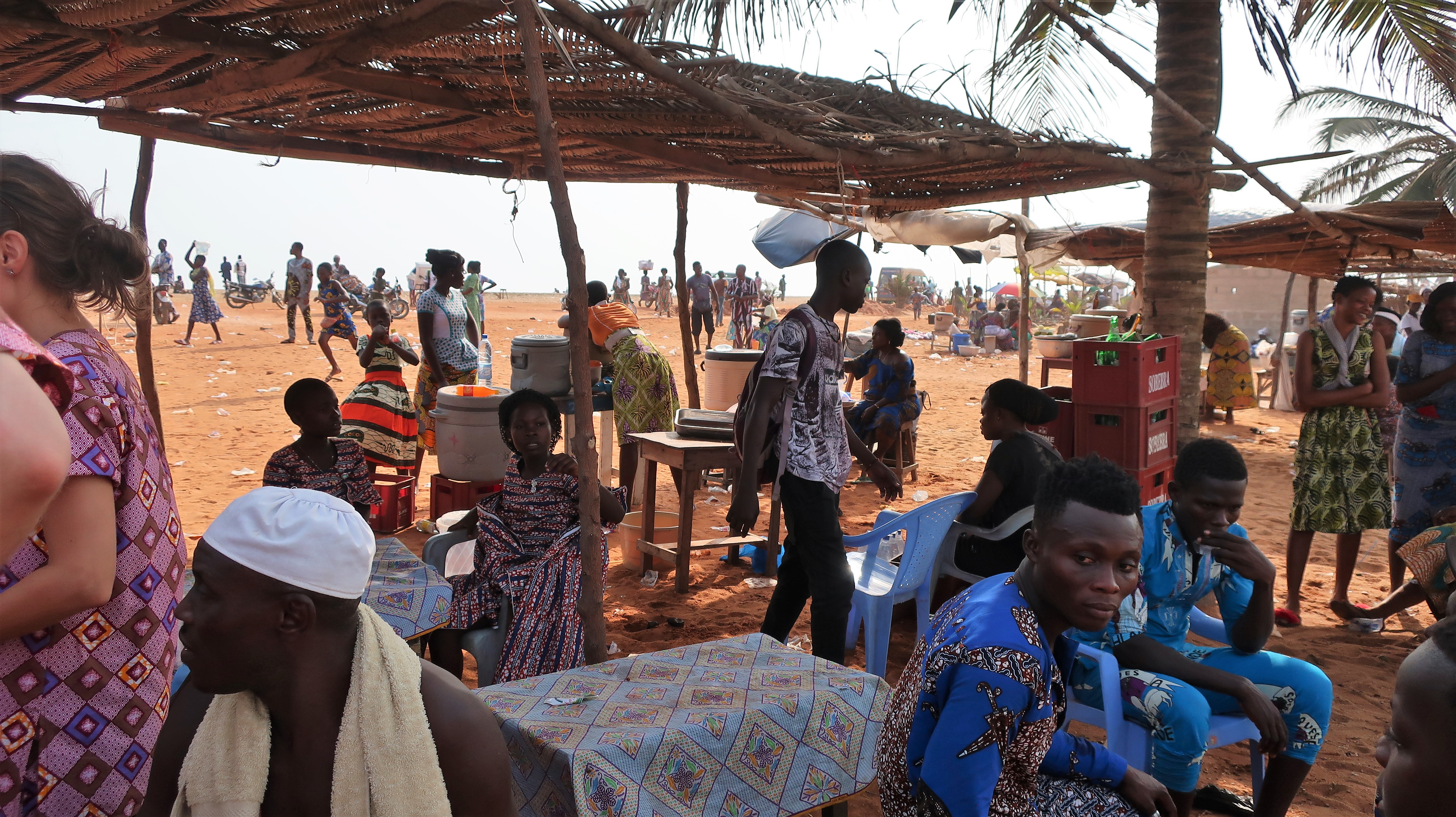
A restaurant in the festival area.

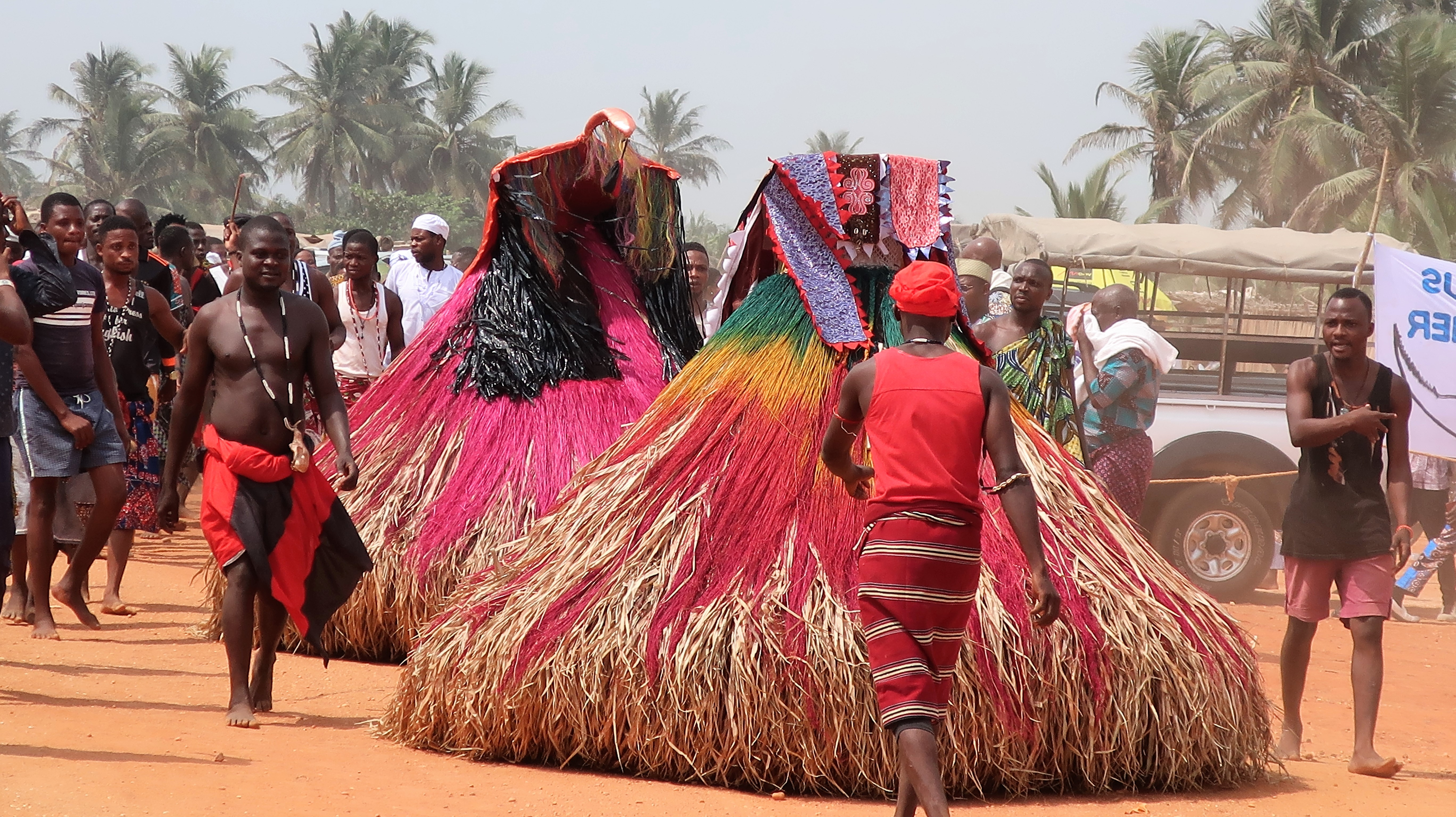
Two Zangbetos.

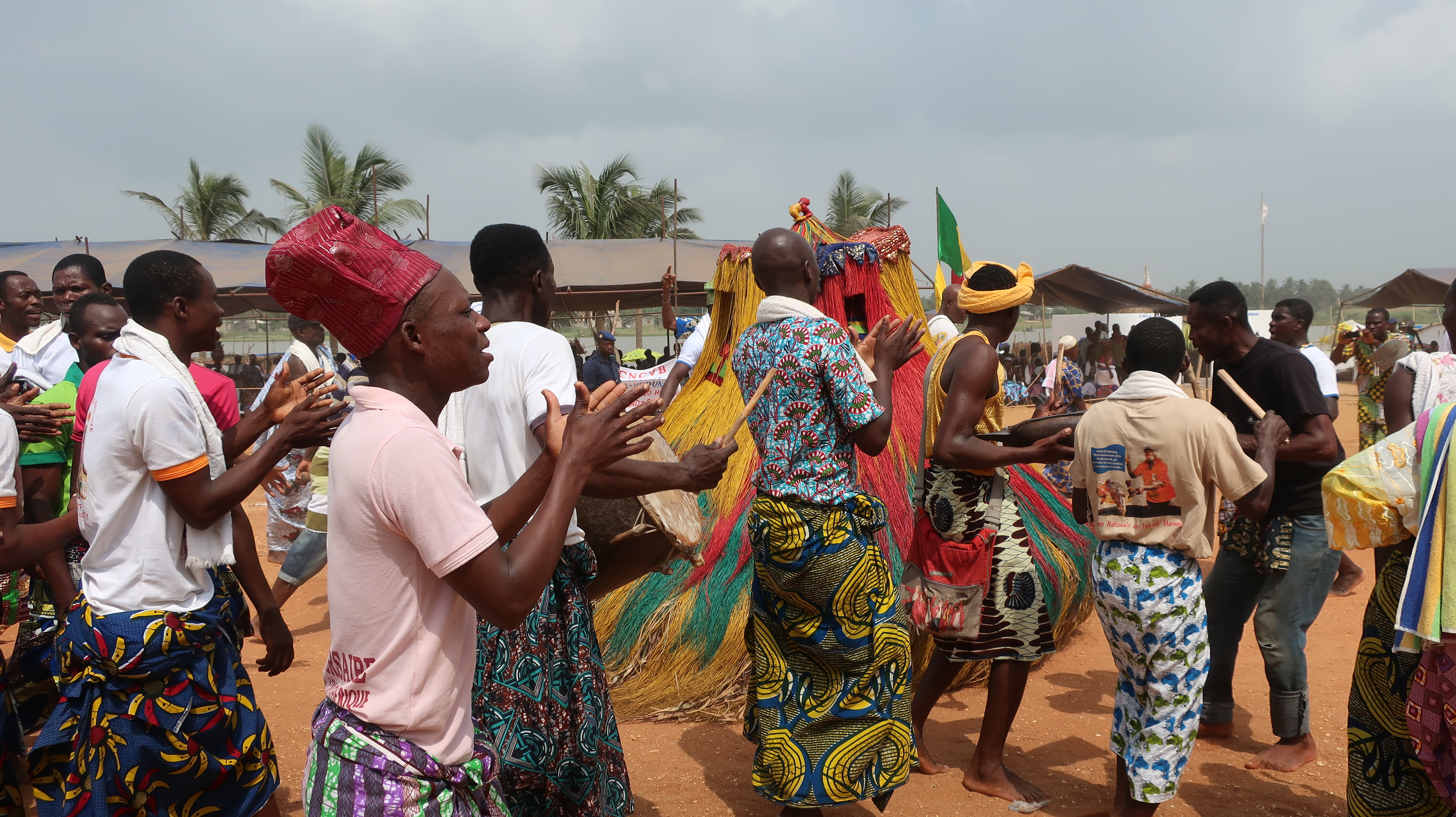
Festival procession.

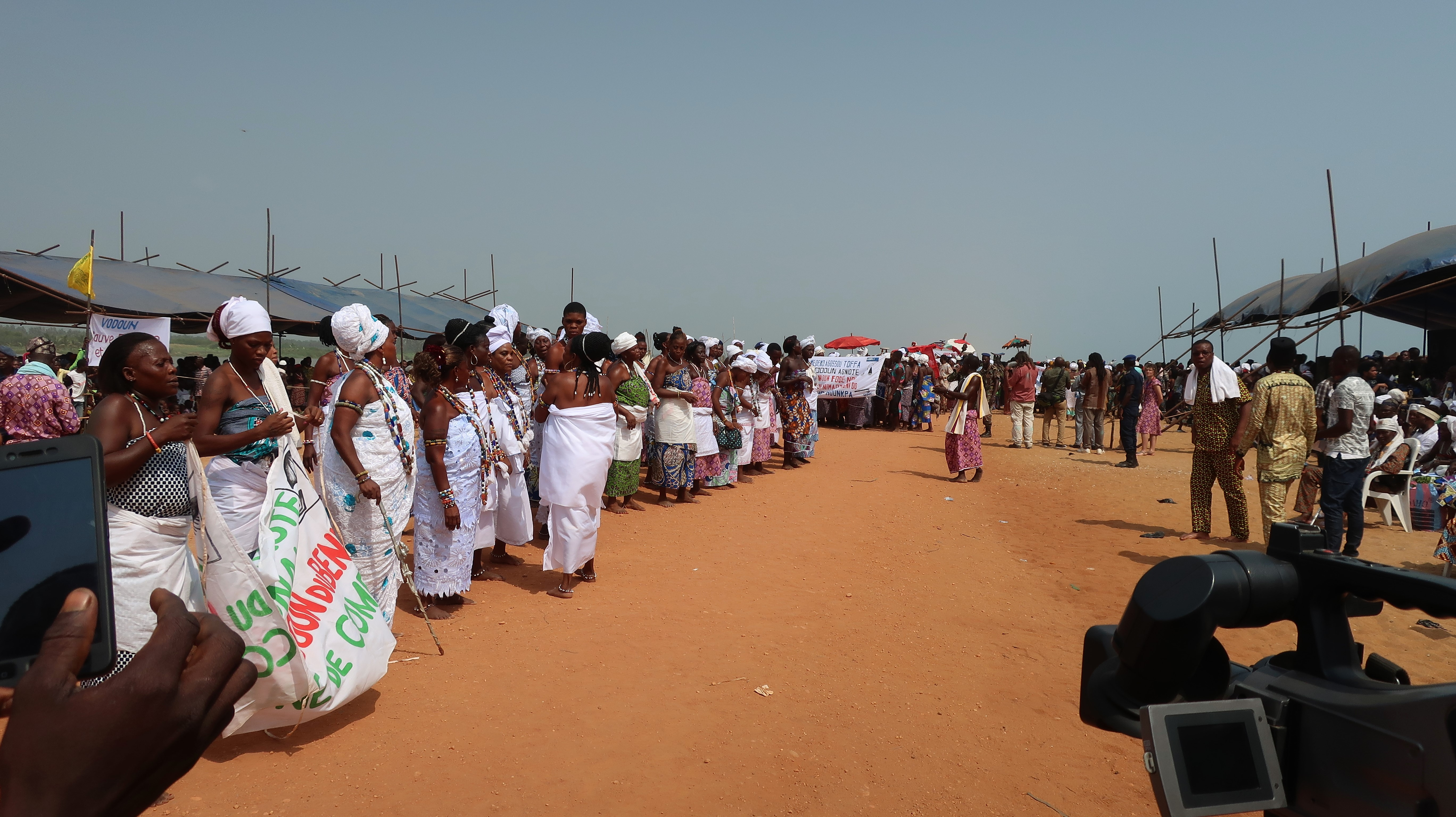
Procession and audience.

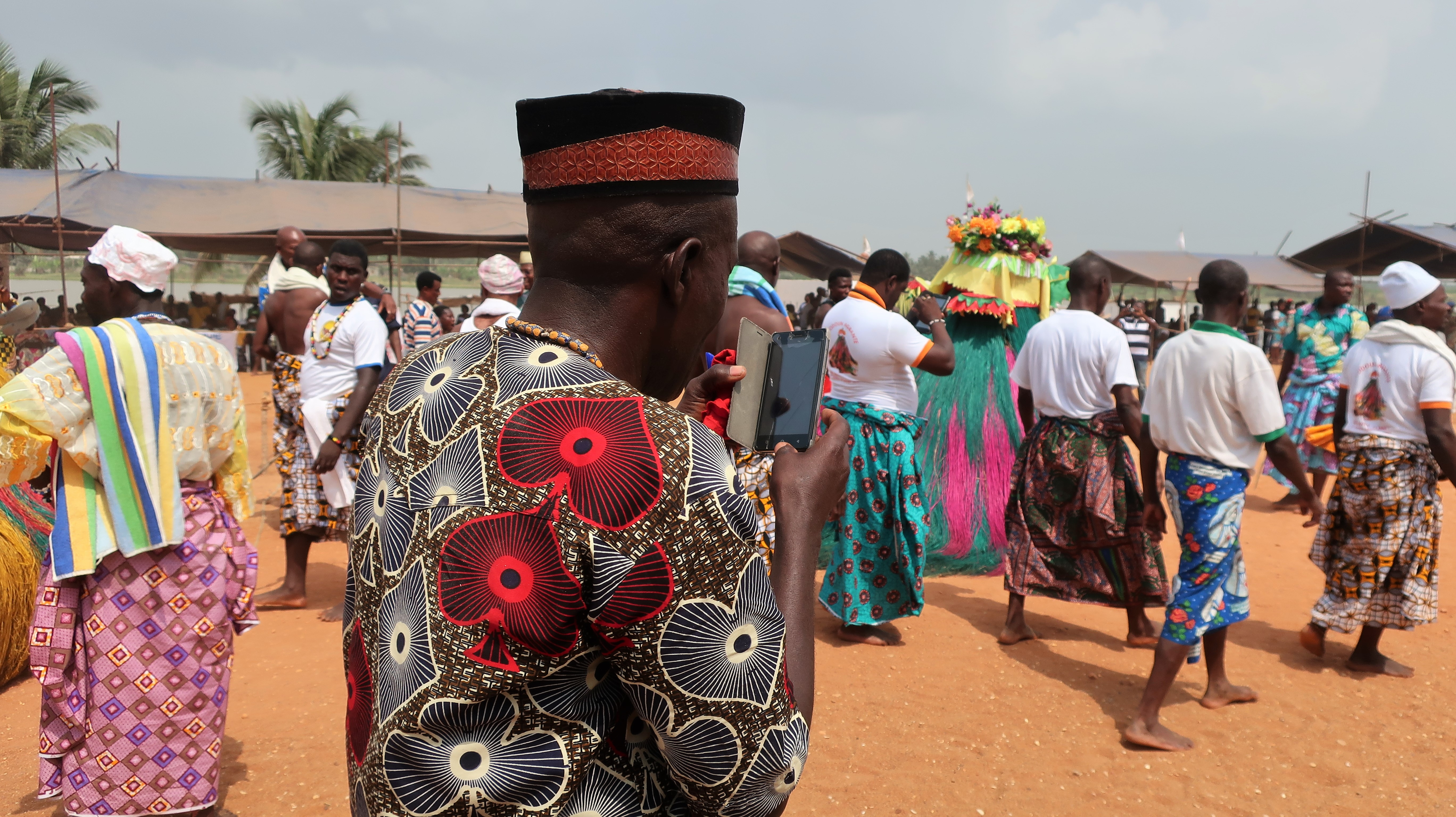
Procession and a photographer.

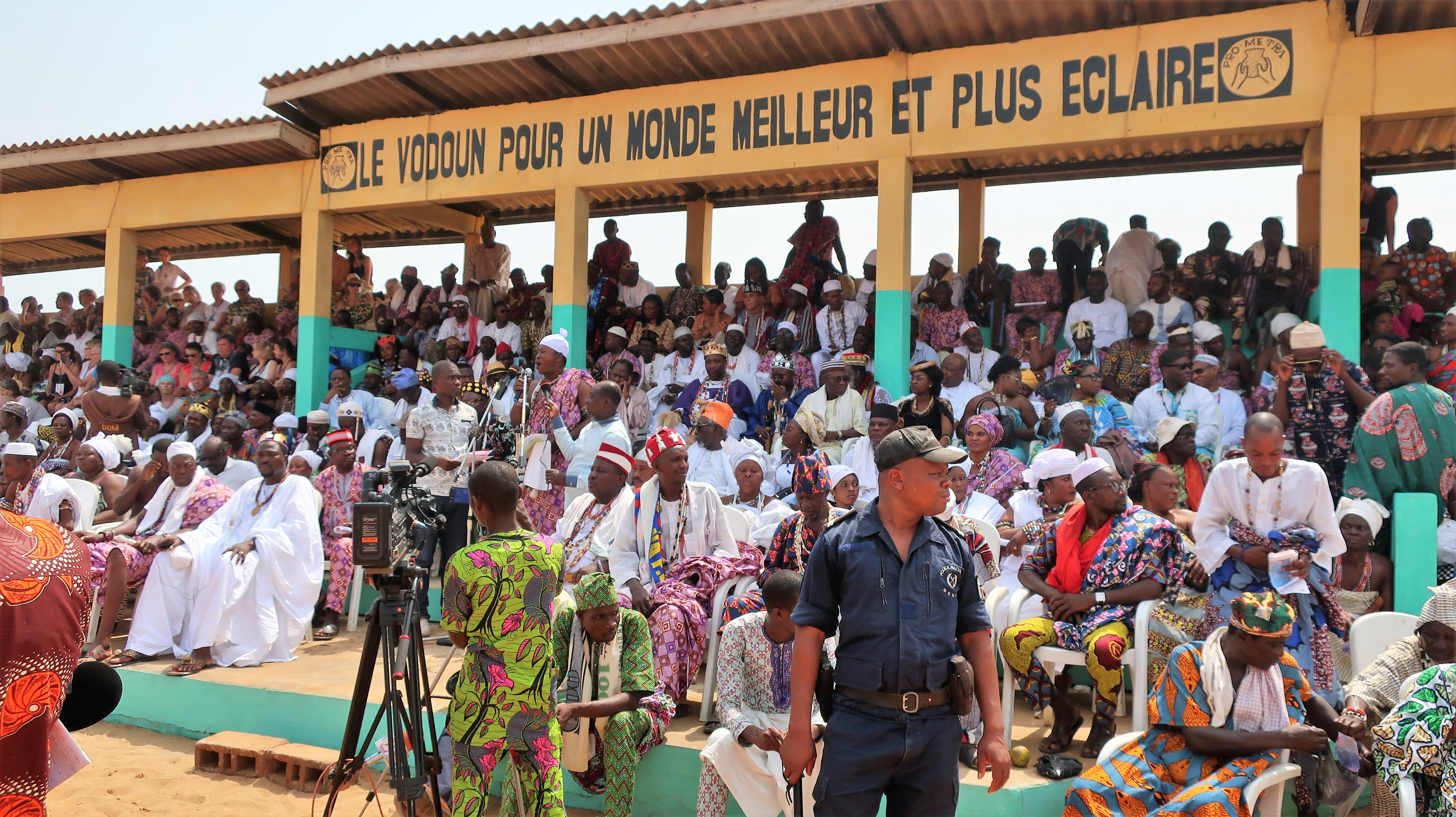
Speakers, TV-group and festival audience.

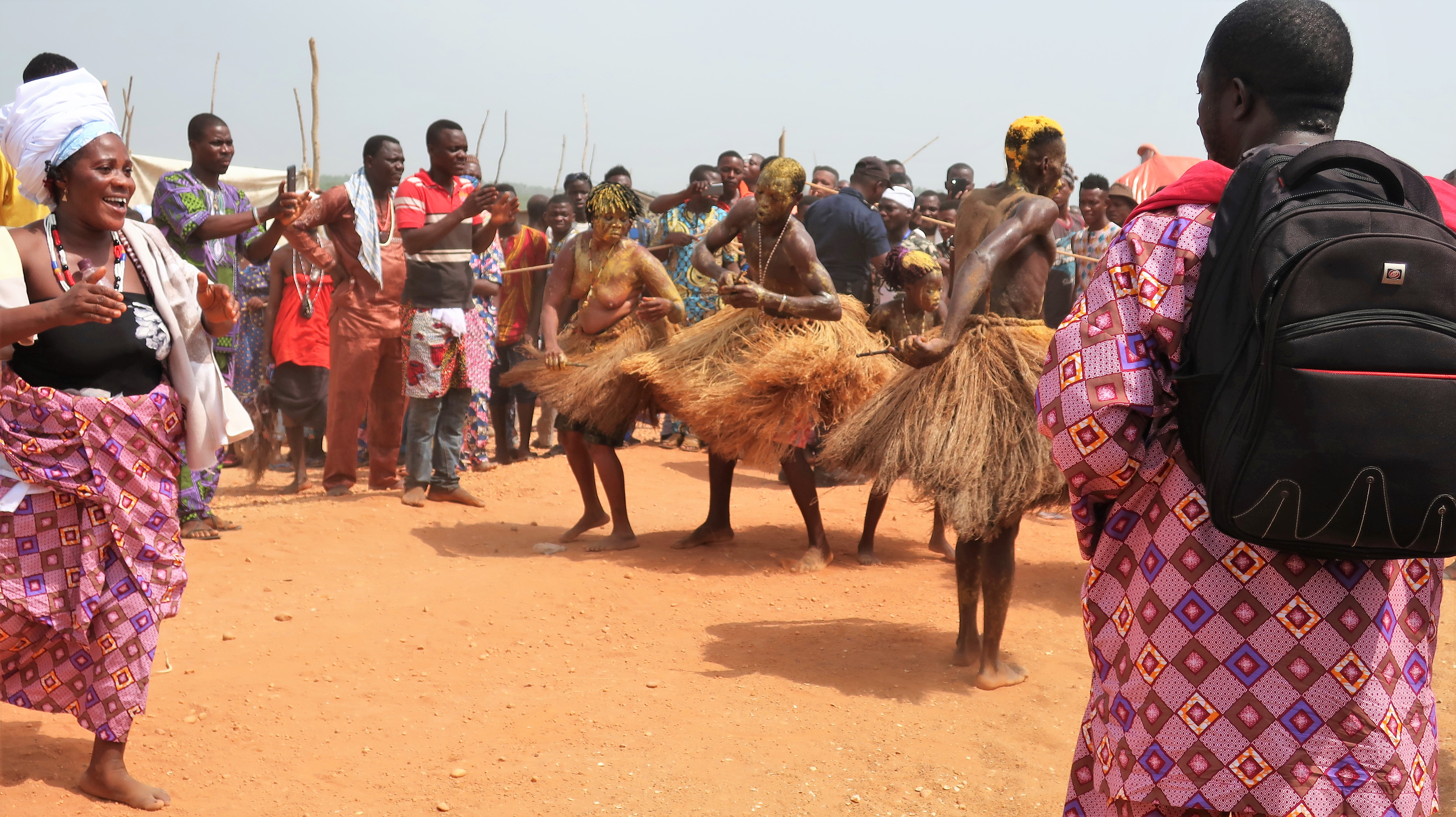
Dancers

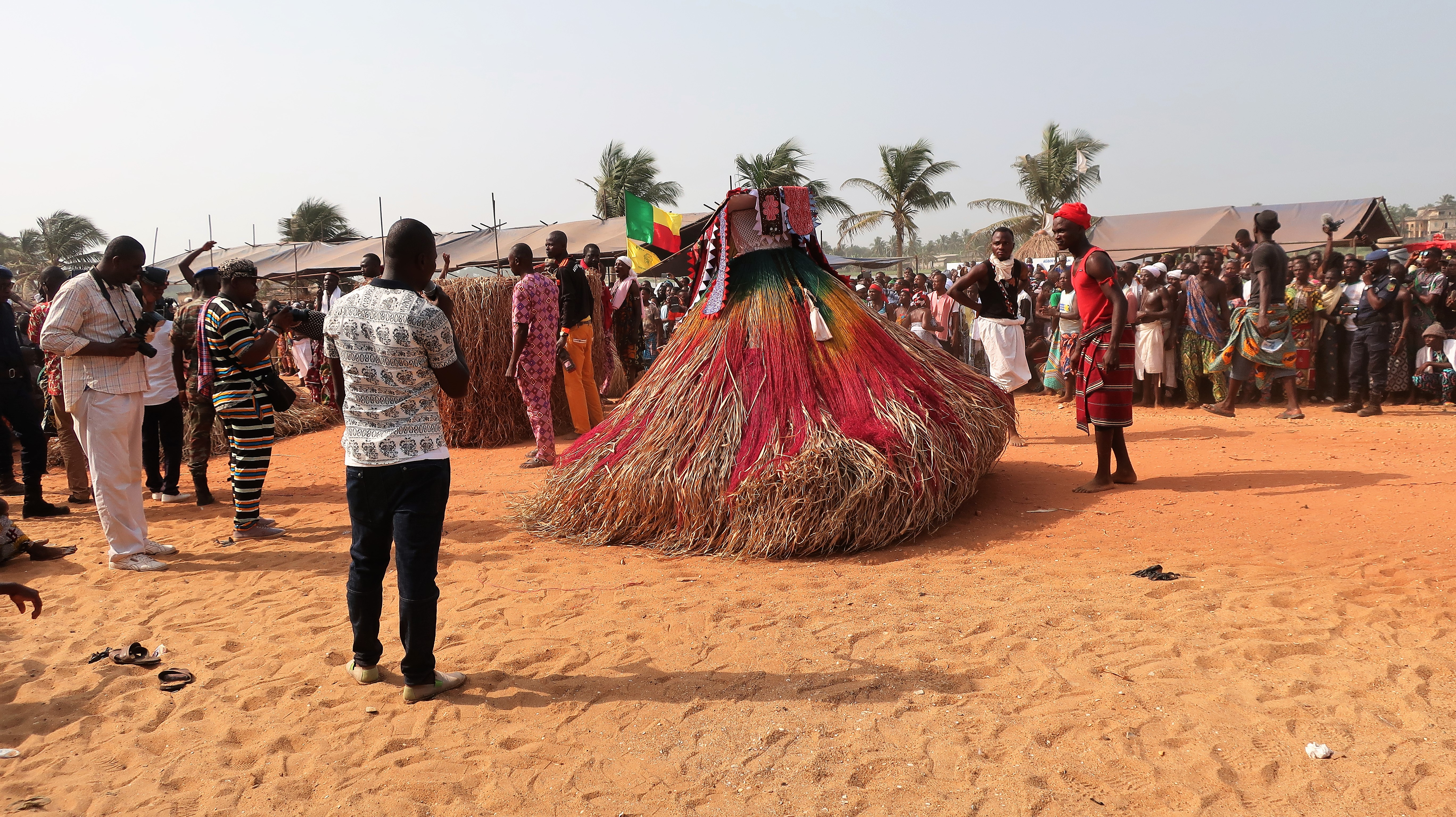
Zangbeto
