= Public holidays in the Republic of the Congo =

This is a list of public holidays in the Republic of Congo.

Date	English name	Local name	Kituba name
January 1	New Year's Day	Jour de l'An	Bonane
May 1	Labour Day	Fête du Travail	Mukembo ya bantu yina ke salaka
June 10	Reconciliation Day	Fête de la Réconciliation	
August 15	National Day	Fête Nationale	Indépendance
November 1	All Saints' Day	Toussaint	Mukembo ya bantu ya kufwa
November 28	Republic Day	Jour de la République	
December 25	Christmas Day	Noël	Nowele

== Movable holidays ==
The following holidays are public holidays but the date on which each occurs varies, according to its corresponding calendar, and thus has no set date. In order in which they occur:

English name	Local name	Description
Easter Monday	Lundi de Pâques	Monday after Easter
Ascension Day	Ascension	Thursday, 40 days after Easter
Whit Monday	Lundi de Pentecôte	Seventh Sunday after Easter

== Notes ==
New Year's Day, Easter, Labor Day, Independence Day, All Saints' Day and Christmas Day are widely recognized and celebrated holidays. The other holidays listed are officially recognized by the government's Department of Labor (Direction Départementale du Travail) and are granted to government workers; the government requires that businesses operating in the country also recognize them, though employees, if even familiar with them, tend to prefer working as usual (with government-mandated overtime wages) on those days.

== Sources ==
- Les jours fériés en République du Congo (in French)
