= Satires (disambiguation) =

Satires are cultural texts in which vices, follies, abuses, and shortcomings are held up to ridicule.

Satires may also refer to:

- Satires (Horace), a collection of satirical poems
- Satires (Juvenal), a collection of satirical poems

== See also ==
- Satyrs
