= Saturae =

Saturae may refer to:

- Horace - Saturae
- Juvenal - Saturae
