= Public holidays in French Guiana =

This is a list of public holidays in French Guiana.

Date	Name in English	Name in French	Remarks
January 1	New Year's Day	Jour de l'An	
movable holiday	Easter Monday	Lundi de Pâques	
May 1	Labour Day	Fête du Travail	
May 8	Victory Day	Fête de la Victoire 1945	
movable holiday	Ascension Day	Ascension	
movable holiday	White Monday	Lundi de Pentecôte	
June 10	Emancipation Day	Abolition de l'Esclavage	
July 14	National Day	Fête Nationale	
August 15	Assumption Day	Assomption	
October 15	Cayenne Festival	Festival Cayenne	Observed in Cayenne only.
November 1	All Saints' Day	Toussaint	
November 11	Armistice Day	Armistice de 1918	
December 25	Christmas Day	Noël	

Below are jour chômé d'usage holidays.

Date	Name in English	Name in French	Remarks
Movable holidays	Carnival	Carnaval	Often take 3 days, the final day lies on Ash Wednesday
movable holiday	Mid-Lent	Mi-Carême	
movable holiday	Good Friday	Vendredi saint	Often observed by banking sector
