= Public holidays in Saint Barthélemy =

This is a list of public holidays in Saint Barthélemy.

Date	Name in English	Name in French	Remarks
January 1	New Year's Day	Jour de l'An	
movable holiday	Easter Monday	Lundi de Pâques	
May 1	Labour Day	Fête du Travail	
May 8	Victory Day	Fête de la Victoire 1945	
movable holiday	Ascension Day	Ascension	
movable holiday	Whit Monday	Lundi de Pentecôte	
July 14	National Day	Fête Nationale	
August 15	Assumption Day	Assomption	
October 9	Abolition Day	Abolition de l'Esclavage	Date of abolition of slavery.
November 1	All Saints' Day	Toussaint	
November 11	Armistice Day	Armistice	
December 25	Christmas Day	Noël	

In addition, like other French Caribbean territories, private sector often take these holidays (jour chômé d'usage in France) which are not official holidays.

Date	Name in English	Name in French	Remarks
Movable holidays	Carnival	Carnaval	Often take 3 days, the final day lies on Ash Wednesday
movable holiday	Mid-Lent	Mi-Carême	
movable holiday	Good Friday		Often observed by banking sector
