= Public holidays in the Collectivity of Saint Martin =

This is a list of public holidays in Saint Martin.

| Date | Name in English | Name in French | Remarks |
|---|---|---|---|
| January 1 | New Year's Day | Jour de l'An | |
| movable holiday | Easter Monday | Lundi de Pâques | |
| May 1 | Labour Day | Fête du Travail | |
| May 8 | Victory Day | Fête de la Victoire 1945 | |
| movable holiday | Ascension Day | Ascension | |
| movable holiday | Whit Monday | Lundi de Pentecôte | |
| May 28 | Abolition Day | Abolition de l'Esclavage | Date of abolition of slavery, observed since 2018. |
| July 14 | National Day | Fête Nationale | |
| August 15 | Assumption Day | Assomption | |
| November 1 | All Saints' Day | Toussaint | |
| November 11 | Armistice Day | Armistice | |
| December 25 | Christmas Day | Noël | |

In addition, like other French Caribbean territories, the private sector often take these holidays (jour chômé d'usage in French) which are not official holidays.

| Date | Name in English | Name in French | Remarks |
|---|---|---|---|
| movable holiday | Carnival | Carnaval | Often take 3 days, the final day lies on Ash Wednesday |
| movable holiday | Mid-Lent | Mi-Carême | |
| movable holiday | Good Friday | Vendredi Saint | Often observed by banking sector |
