= All Saints' Day =

Christian feast day

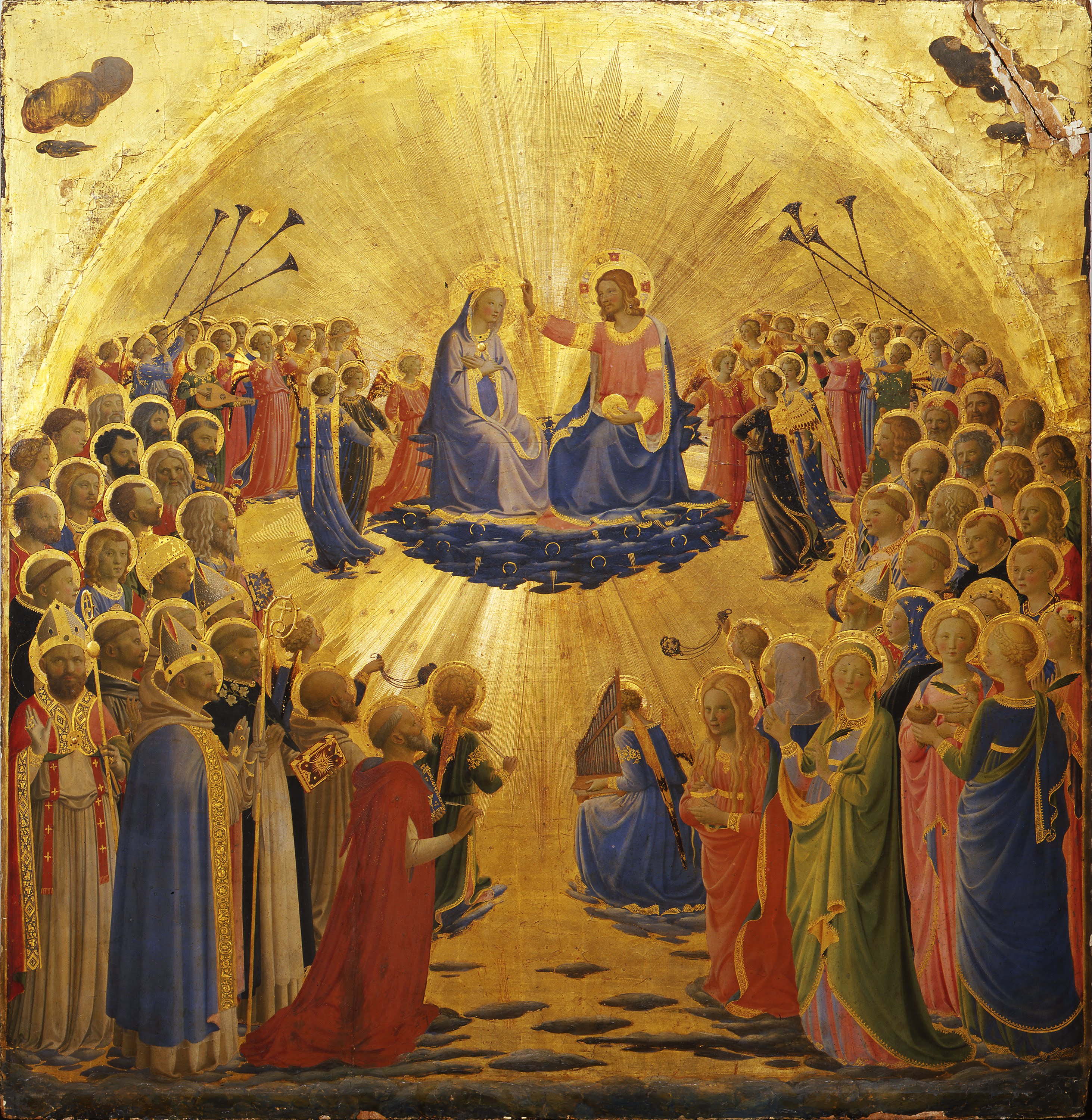
- The Coronation of the Virgin, Fra Angelico, 1434–1435
- Also called: All Hallows' Day; Hallowmas; Allhallowmas; Feast of All Saints; Feast of All Hallows; Solemnity of All Saints
- Observed by: Catholic Church; Eastern Orthodox Church; Oriental Orthodox Church; Lutheran Churches; Anglican Communion; Methodist Churches; Church of the Nazarene; Reformed Churches; Philippine Independent Church; Other Christian denominations
- Liturgical color: White (Western Christianity); Green (Eastern Christianity)
- Type: Christian
- Observances: Church services, praying for the dead, visiting cemeteries
- Date: 1 November (Western Christianity); Sunday after Pentecost (Eastern Christianity)
- Frequency: Annual
- Related to: Allhallowtide; Halloween; All Souls' Day; Day of the Dead; Totensonntag

All Saints' Day (Note: also known as All Hallows' Day, the Feast of All Saints, the Feast of All Hallows, the Solemnity of All Saints, and Hallowmas,) is a Christian holy day celebrated in honour of all the saints of the Church In the 9th century, the Catholic Church set the date of November 1 for the commemoration of all saints. All Saints' Day is a solemnity in Catholicism and a festival in Lutheranism.

In the Western Christian practice, the liturgical celebration begins with its first vespers on the evening of October 31, All Hallows' Eve (All Saints' Eve or Hallowe'en), and ends at the compline of November 1. It is thus the day before All Souls' Day, which commemorates the faithful departed. In many traditions, All Saints' Day is part of the season of Allhallowtide, which includes the three days from October 31 to November 2 inclusive, as well as the International Day of Prayer for the Persecuted Church (held on the first Sunday of November), and in some Christian denominations, such as Anglicanism, extends to Remembrance Sunday. In places where All Saints' Day is observed as a public holiday, cemetery and grave rituals such as offerings of flowers, candles and prayers or blessings for the graves of loved ones often take place on All Saints' Day (along with other days of Allsaintstide, especially on All Hallows Eve and All Souls Day). The ceremonial use of candles symbolizes the light of Christ and the use of lamps at the tombs of martyrs dates back to the early Christian period. In Austria and Germany, godparents gift their godchildren Allerheiligenstriezel ("All Saint's plaited bun") on All Saint's Day, while the practice of souling remains popular in Portugal.

All Saints' Day is a national holiday in many Christian countries.

The Eastern Orthodox Church and associated Eastern Catholic and Eastern Protestant churches celebrate it on the first Sunday after Pentecost. The Syro-Malabar Church and the Chaldean Catholic Church, both of which are in communion with Rome, as well as the Church of the East, celebrate All Saints' Day on the first Friday after Easter Sunday. In the Coptic Orthodox tradition, All Saints' Day is on Nayrouz, celebrated on September 11. The day is the start of the Coptic new year, and of its first month, Thout.

The celebration of All Saints' Day and All Souls' Day stems from a belief that there is a powerful spiritual bond between those in heaven (the "Church triumphant"), the living (the "Church militant"), and the "Church penitent" which includes the faithful departed. In Catholic theology, the day commemorates all those who have attained the beatific vision in heaven. The Lutheran branch of Christianity, on All Hallows' Day, remembers "those blessed fellow-believers who died in the Lord and are now at rest even as we wait with them for the Last Day and the resurrection of the body to eternal life with Christ." In Methodism, All Saints' Day revolves around "giving God solemn thanks for the lives and deaths of his saints", including those who are "famous or obscure". As such, individuals throughout the Church are honoured, such as Paul the Apostle, Augustine of Hippo and other saints, varying according to the hagiographic traditions of the Church in question. In some traditions, the day is also used to celebrate individuals who have personally led one to faith in Jesus, such as one's grandmother or friend.

== Observance by Christian denomination ==
=== Western Christianity ===
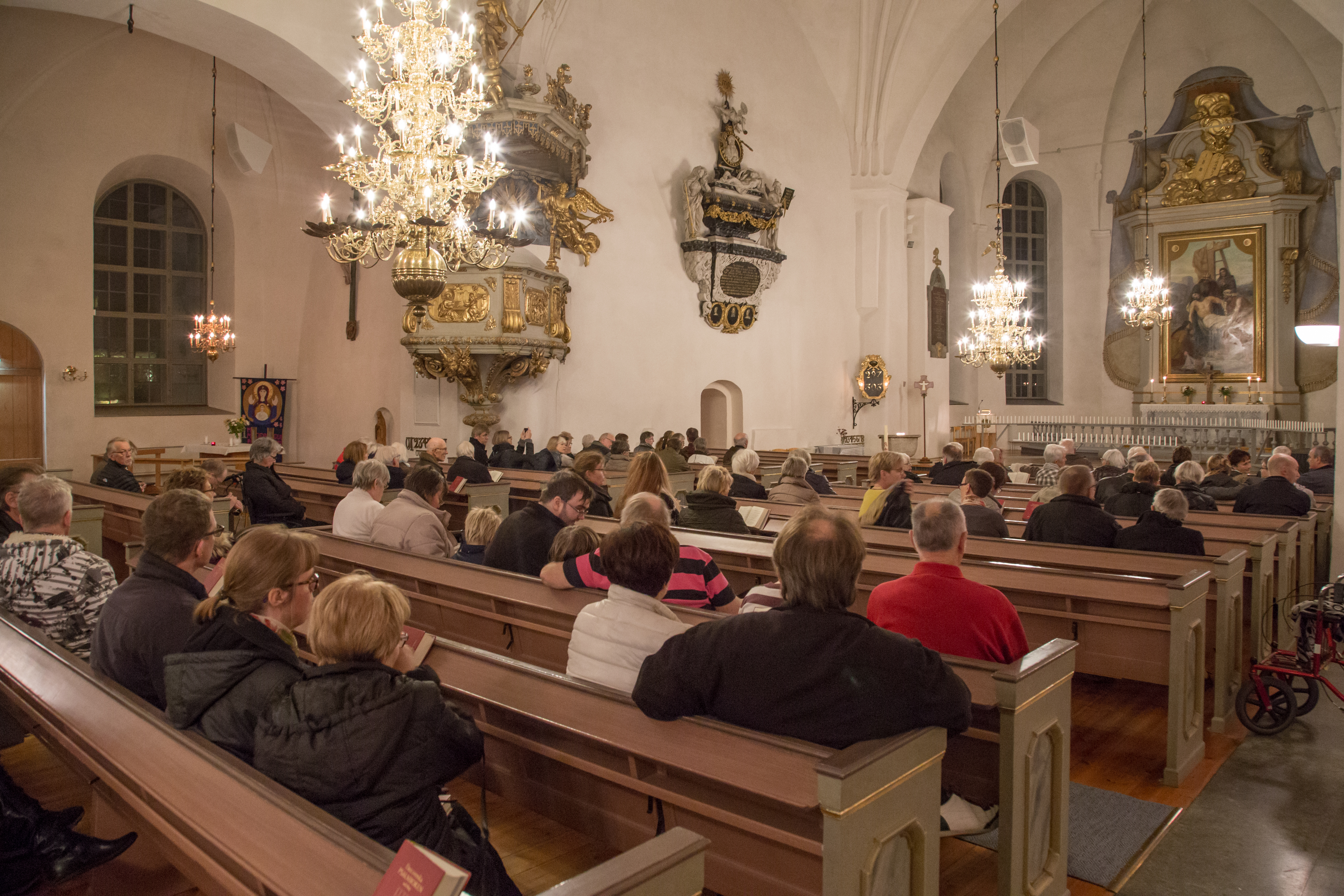
Mass being celebrated on All Saints' Day at Hedemora Evangelical-Lutheran Church in Sweden

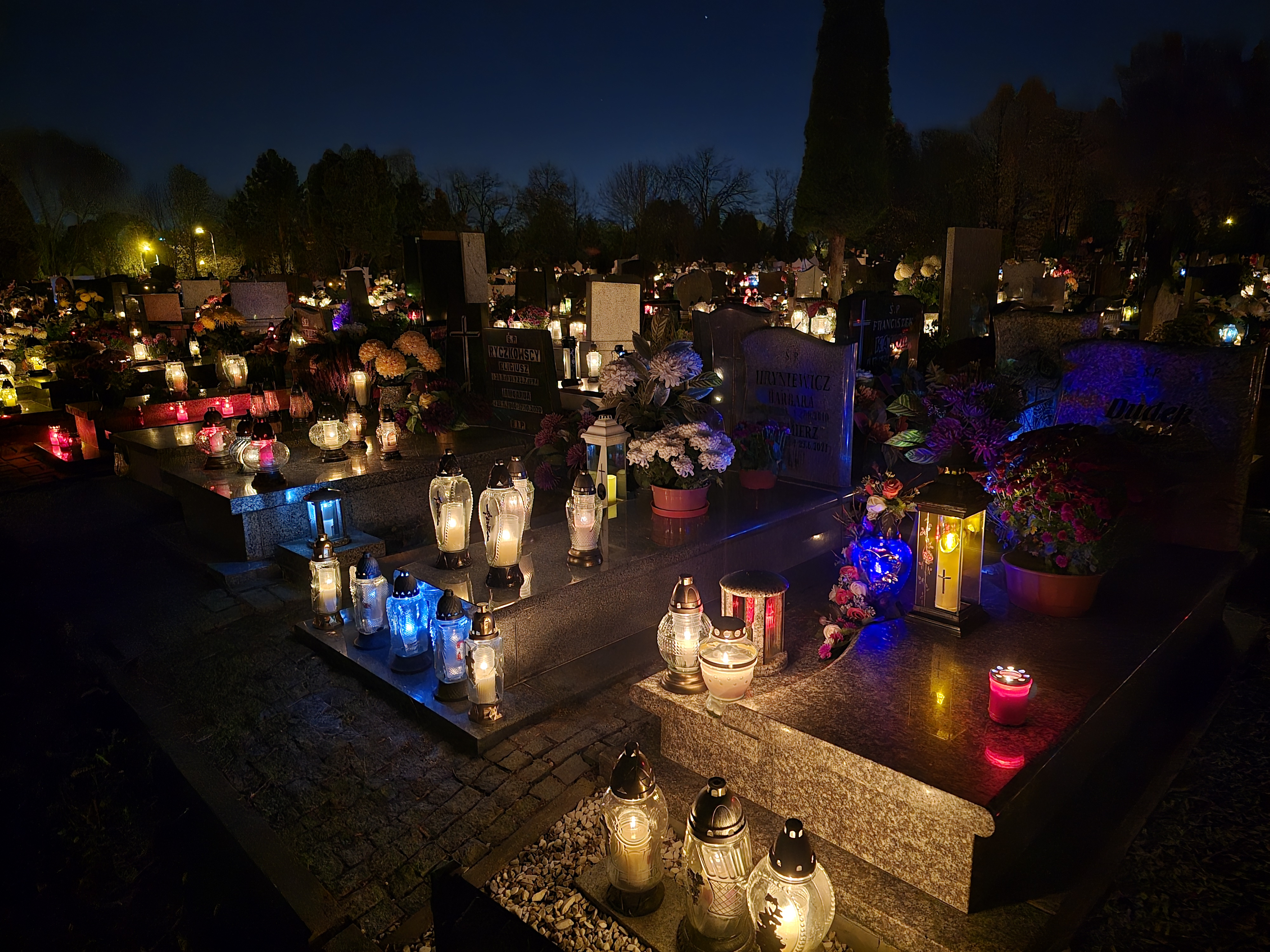
Graves in a Polish cemetery, decorated with candles for All Souls' Day

The holiday of All Saints' Day falls on November 1 and is followed by All Souls' Day on November 2. It is a Solemnity in the Roman Rite of the Catholic Church, a Festival in the Lutheran Churches, and a Principal Feast of the Anglican Communion.

==== History ====
From the 4th century, there existed in certain places and at sporadic intervals a feast day to commemorate all Christian martyrs. It was held on May 13 in Edessa, the Sunday after Pentecost in Antioch, and the Friday after Easter by the Syrians. During the 5th century, St. Maximus of Turin preached annually on the Sunday after Pentecost in honor of all martyrs in what is today northern Italy. The Comes of Würzburg, the earliest existing ecclesiastical reading list, dating to the late 6th or early 7th century in what is today Germany, lists the Sunday after Pentecost as dominica in natale sanctorum ('Sunday of the Nativity of the Saints'). By this time, the commemoration had expanded to include all saints, martyred or not.

On 13 May 609 or 610, Pope Boniface IV consecrated the Pantheon at Rome to the Blessed Virgin Mary and all the martyrs, ordering an anniversary; the feast of dedicatio Sanctae Mariae ad Martyres has been celebrated at Rome ever since. It is suggested May 13 was chosen by the Pope and earlier by Christians in Edessa because it was the date of the Roman pagan festival of Lemuria, in which malevolent and restless spirits of the dead were propitiated. Some liturgiologists suggest that Lemuria was the origin of All Saints, based on their identical dates and their similar theme of "all the dead". (Note: For example Alford 1941, p. 181 note 56 observes that "Saints were often confounded with the Lares or Dead. Repasts for both were prepared in early Christian times, and All Saints' Day was transferred in 835 to November 1st from one of the days in May which were the old Lemuralia"; Alford notes Pierre Saintyves, Les saints successeurs des dieux, Paris 1906 (sic, i.e. 1907).)

Pope Gregory III (731–741) dedicated an oratory in Old St. Peter's Basilica to the relics "of the holy apostles and of all saints, martyrs and confessors, of all the just made perfect who are at rest throughout the world". Some sources say Gregory III dedicated the oratory on November 1, and this is why the date became All Saints' Day. Other sources say Gregory III held a synod to condemn iconoclasm on 1 November 731, but he dedicated the All Saints oratory on Palm Sunday, 12 April 732.

By 800, there is evidence that churches in Gaelic Ireland and Anglo-Saxon Northumbria were holding a feast commemorating all saints on November 1. There was much Gaelic influence on Northumbria and its church during this period. Some manuscripts of the Irish Martyrology of Tallaght and Martyrology of Óengus, which date to this time, have a commemoration of all saints of the world on November 1. In 800, Alcuin of Northumbria recommended the November 1st feast to his friend, Arno of Salzburg in Bavaria. Alcuin, a member of Charlemagne's court, may have been responsible for introducing this Irish-Northumbrian feast of All Saints in the Frankish Empire. Adoption of the November 1st feast might also have been driven by Irish missionaries, and there were Irish clerics and scholars at Charlemagne's court as well.

James Frazer represents this school of thought by arguing that November 1 was chosen because Samhain was the date of the Celtic festival of the dead. Ronald Hutton argues instead that the earliest documentary sources indicate Samhain was a harvest festival with no particular ritual connections to the dead. Hutton proposes that November 1 was a Germanic rather than a Celtic idea.

In 835, Charlemagne's son and successor, Emperor Louis the Pious, made All Saints' Day on November 1, a holy day of obligation throughout the Frankish Empire. His decree was issued "at the instance of Pope Gregory IV and with the assent of all the bishops", confirming the November 1st date.

Sicard of Cremona, a scholar who lived in the 12th and 13th centuries, proposed that Pope Gregory VII (1073–85) suppressed the May 13th date in favour of 1 November. By the 12th century, the May 13th feast of All Saints had been deleted from liturgical books.

The All Saints octave was added by Pope Sixtus IV (1471–84).

==== Catholic observances ====
In the Catholic Church, All Saints' Day is a holy day of obligation. It is celebrated through the offering of the Mass and families visit graveyards through the season of Allhallowtide, especially on All Hallow's Eve, All Saints' Day and All Souls' Day. In 1955, the All Saints vigil and the octave were suppressed by the Liturgical reforms of Pope Pius XII, though Traditional Catholic communities utilising the pre-1955 liturgical calendar continue to observe it.

==== Evangelical Lutheran observances ====
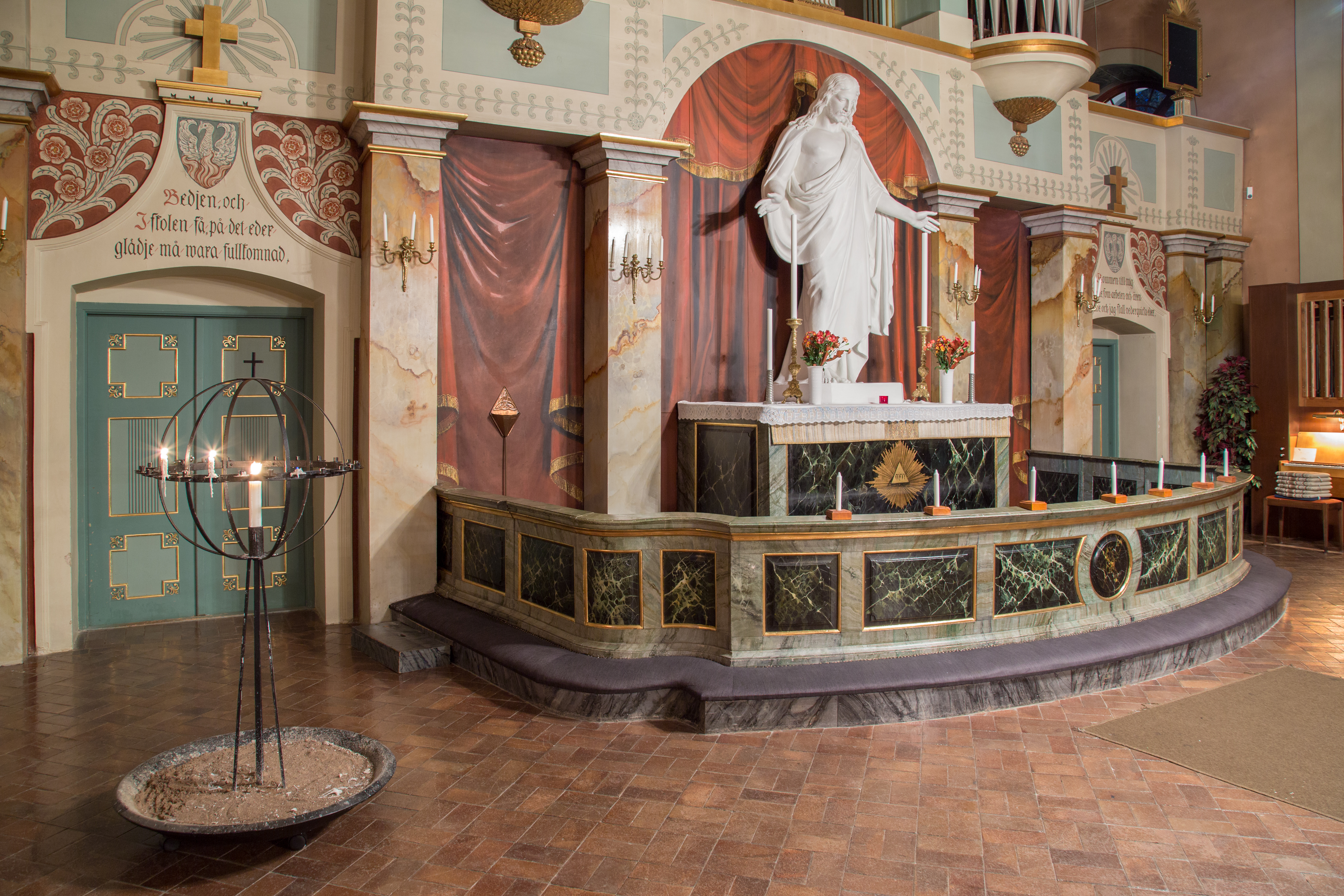
Garpenbergs Evangelical-Lutheran Church in Sweden is prepared for the celebration of Mass on All Saints' Day

The festival was retained after the Reformation in the liturgical calendars of the Evangelical-Lutheran Churches. In the Lutheran churches, such as the Church of Sweden, it assumes a role of general commemoration of the dead, though a special emphasis is placed on the martyrs for the faith (cf. Saints of Evangelical-Lutheranism). All Saints Day is a public holiday in Evangelical Lutheran countries, such as Sweden and Finland. In some Lutheran congregations, its observance is moved to the first Sunday of November. In the Lutheran churches, the liturgical color for All Saints Day is white and Mass is offered on All Saints Day. The festival honors the saints of Evangelical-Lutheran Christianity, in addition to all those who have died in the Christian faith (the 'faithful departed'), though in certain congregations, the latter is given more emphasis on the following day, All Souls' Day. As such, in the Evangelical Lutheran tradition, the faithful "rejoice in the confession of martyrs unto death on All Saints, and in all the faithful departed, who are in the Church Triumphant, on All Souls." In some places, the names of those within the congregation who have died in the last year are read during worship and each name is marked with the tolling of a bell or the lighting of a candle. The faithful visit cemeteries to place flowers and candles on the graves of their loved ones, along with cleaning them.

==== Anglican and Methodist observances ====
In the Church of England, mother church of the Anglican Communion, it is a Principal Feast and may be celebrated either on November 1 or on the Sunday between October 30 and November 5. It is also celebrated by other Protestants, such as the United Church of Canada and various Methodist connexions. Protestants generally commemorate all Christians, living and deceased, on All Saints' Day; if they observe All Saints' Day at all, they use it to remember all Christians both past and present. In the United Methodist Church, All Saints' Day is celebrated on the first Sunday in November. It is held not only to remember Saints but also members of the local church congregation who have died. In some congregations, a candle is lit by the Acolyte as each person's name is called out by the clergy. Prayers and responsive readings may accompany the event.

==== Vigil ====
Candles lit at graves by family members and friends of the faithful departed in the churchyard of Solna Church (Evangelical-Lutheran) in Stockholm on All Hallows' Eve

Being the vigil of All Saints' Day (All Hallows' Day), in many countries, such as Ireland, the United Kingdom, the United States and Canada, Halloween (All Hallows' Eve or All Saints' Eve) is celebrated on October 31. Mass for the Vigil of All Saints is held in Christian congregations of the Catholic, Lutheran and Anglican denominations. All Hallows' Eve has traditionally been a day of fasting in Western Christianity; Traditional Catholics, Lutherans and Anglicans continue this practice in the present-day. Congregations of the Church of England, mother Church of the Anglican Communion, host light parties in their fellowship halls on All Hallows' Eve. In the Lutheran, Anglican and Reformed traditions of Christianity, All Hallows' Eve is dually celebrated as Reformation Day. During Allhallowtide (especially on All Hallows' Eve, All Saints' Day and All Souls' Day), it is common for Christians to visit graveyards in order to remember their loved ones; families often pray there and decorate the graves of their loved ones with garlands, flowers, candles as well as incense. During the 20th century the observance largely became a secular one, although some traditional Christian groups have continued to embrace the Christian origins of Halloween whereas others have rejected such celebrations.

==== Hymnody ====
In English-speaking countries, services often include the singing of the traditional hymn "For All the Saints" by Walsham How. The most familiar tune for this hymn is Sine Nomine by Ralph Vaughan Williams. Other hymns that are popularly sung during corporate worship on this day are "I Sing a Song of the Saints of God" and "Ye Watchers and Ye Holy Ones".

=== Eastern Christianity ===
The Eastern Orthodox Church, following the Byzantine tradition, commemorates all saints collectively on the Sunday after Pentecost, All Saints' Sunday (Greek: Ἁγίων Πάντων, Agiōn Pantōn).

By 411, the East Syrians kept the Chaldean Calendar with a "Commemoratio Confessorum" celebrated on the Friday after Easter. The 74th homily of St. John Chrysostom from the late 4th or early 5th century marks the observance of a feast of all the martyrs on the first Sunday after Pentecost. Some scholars place the location where this sermon was delivered as Constantinople.

The Feast of All Saints achieved greater prominence in the 9th century, in the reign of the Byzantine Emperor Leo VI "the Wise" (866–911). His wife, Empress Theophano lived a devout life and, after her death, miracles occurred. Her husband built a church for her relics and intended to name it to her. He was discouraged to do so by local bishops and instead dedicated it to "All Saints". According to tradition, it was Leo who expanded the feast from a commemoration of All Martyrs to a general commemoration of All Saints, whether martyrs or not.

This Sunday marks the close of the Paschal season. To the normal Sunday services are added special scriptural readings and hymns to all the saints (known and unknown) from the Pentecostarion.

In the late spring, the Sunday following Pentecost Saturday (50 days after Easter) is set aside as a commemoration of all locally venerated saints, such as "All Saints of America", "All Saints of Mount Athos", etc. The third Sunday after Pentecost may be observed for even more localised saints, such as "All Saints of St. Petersburg", or for saints of a particular type, such as "New Martyrs of the Turkish Yoke".

In addition to the Mondays mentioned above, Saturdays throughout the year are days for general commemoration of all saints, and special hymns to all saints are chanted from the Octoechos.

==== Lebanon ====
The celebration of November 1 in Lebanon as a holiday reflects the influence of Western Catholic orders present in Lebanon and is not Maronite in origin. The traditional Maronite feast equivalent to the honor of all saints in their liturgical calendar is one of three Sundays in preparation for Lent called the Sunday of the Righteous and the Just. The following Sunday is the Sunday of the Faithful Departed (similar to All Souls' Day in Western calendar).

==== East Syriac tradition ====
In East Syriac tradition the All Saints' Day celebration falls on the first Friday after resurrection Sunday. This is because all departed faithful are saved by the blood of Jesus and they resurrected with the Christ. Normally in east Syriac liturgy the departed souls are remembered on Friday. Church celebrates All Souls' Day on Friday before the beginning of Great lent or Great Fast.

== Customs ==
=== Europe ===
==== Austria and Bavaria ====
In Austria and Bavaria, it is customary on All Saints' Day for godfathers to give their godchildren Allerheiligenstriezel, a braided yeast pastry. People decorate and visit graves of their family members.

==== Belgium ====
In Belgium, Toussaint or Allerheiligen is a public holiday. Belgians visit the cemeteries to place chrysanthemums on the graves of deceased relatives on All Saints' Day, since All Souls' Day is not a holiday.

==== Croatia ====
All Saints' Day (Croatian: Svi sveti) is observed in Croatia by placing candles and flowers on the graves of the deceased. It is a public holiday with most businesses closed. Cities provide free public transportation to the local cemeteries. Liturgies are also conducted by priests around a central location in some cemeteries; the one held in Mirogoj, Zagreb is broadcast every year on national television.

==== France ====
In France, and throughout the Francophone world, the day is known as La Toussaint. Flowers (especially chrysanthemums), or wreaths called couronnes de toussaints, are placed at each tomb or grave. The following day, November 2 (All Souls' Day) is called Le jour des morts, the Day of the Dead. November 1 is a public holiday.

==== Germany ====
In Germany, Allerheiligen is a public holiday in five federal states, namely Baden-Württemberg, Bayern, Rheinland-Pfalz, Nordrhein-Westfalen and Saarland. They categorize it as a silent day (stiller Tag) when public entertainment events are only permitted if the serious character of the day is preserved.

==== Hungary ====
In Hungary, Mindenszentek napja (literally All Saints Day) is a national holiday which is followed by Halottak napja (Day of the Dead). On Day of the Dead people take candles and flowers (especially chrysanthemums) on the tombs or graves of all their loved ones and relatives thus many people travel around the country to distant cemeteries. People who cannot travel may lay their flowers or candles at the main calvary cross of a nearby cemetery. Since only All Saints' Day is a national holiday, most people use this day to visit cemeteries and pay tribute to their deceased relatives. As in the case with every national holiday in Hungary if All Saints' Day happens to be a Tuesday or a Thursday then that week's Monday or Friday is observed as a Saturday, making that weekend four days long, and one of the previous or following Saturdays is changed to a workday. Traffic in and around cemeteries are much higher than usual on these days with actual police presence.

==== Poland ====
In Poland, Dzień Wszystkich Świętych is a public holiday. Families try to gather together for both All Saints' Day and the All Souls' Day (Zaduszki), the official day to commemorate the departed faithful. The celebrations begin with tending to family graves and the surrounding graveyards, lighting candles and leaving flowers. November 1 is a public holiday in Poland, while the following All Souls' Day is not. The Zaduszki custom of honouring the dead thus corresponds with All Souls' Day celebrations and is much more observed in Poland than in most other places in the West.

==== Portugal ====
In Portugal, Dia de Todos os Santos is a national holiday. Families remember their dead with religious observances and visits to the cemetery. Portuguese children celebrate the Pão-por-Deus tradition (also called bolinho, santorinho, or fiéis de Deus) going door-to-door, (very much like Trick-or-treating) where they receive cakes, nuts, dried fruits, sweets and candies.

==== Spain ====
In Spain, el Día de Todos los Santos is a national holiday. People take flowers to the graves of dead relatives. The play Don Juan Tenorio is traditionally performed.

==== Sweden ====
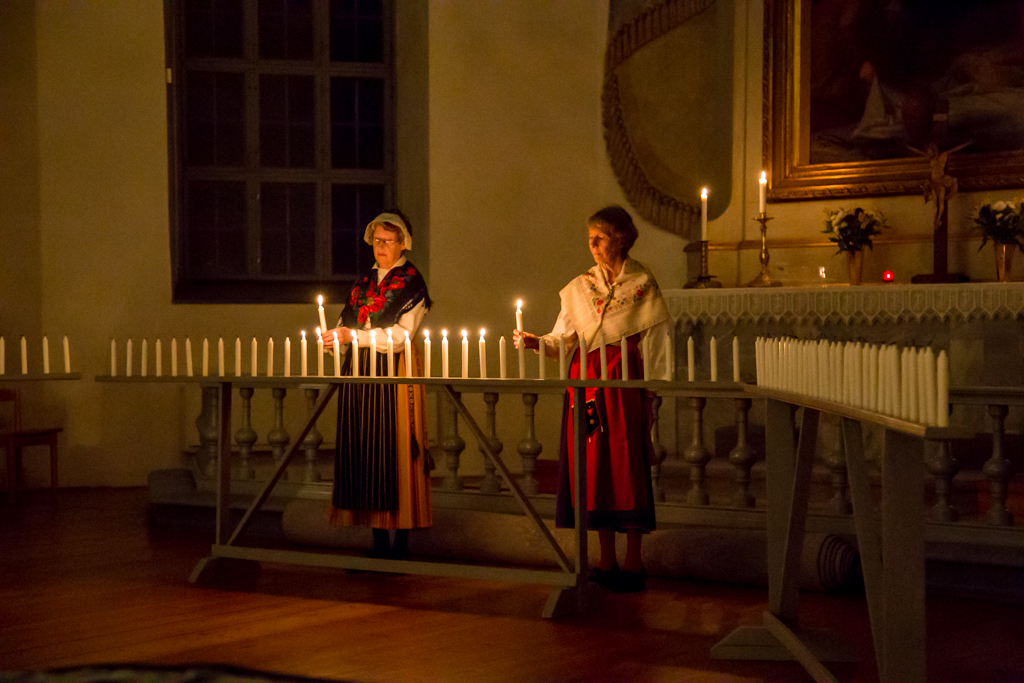
Candles, representing the light of Christ, are lit at Hedemora Evangelical-Lutheran Church in Sweden in honour of the saints

In Lutheran Sweden, the faithful attend Mass on All Saints Day, in addition to visiting cemeteries to clean the graves of their loves ones, while placing flowers and candles on them.

==== Switzerland ====
All Saints' Day is a public holiday or 'silent day' in some cantons of Switzerland.It is marked by bringing flowers and lighting candles in cemeteries, attending church services, baking special breads and pastries like Allerheiligenstriezel, Allerheiligenwecken, Allerheiligenzopf, or (Seelen)zopf. Originally, these breads were for children and the poor who said a prayer for the dead.

=== Americas ===
==== Guatemala ====
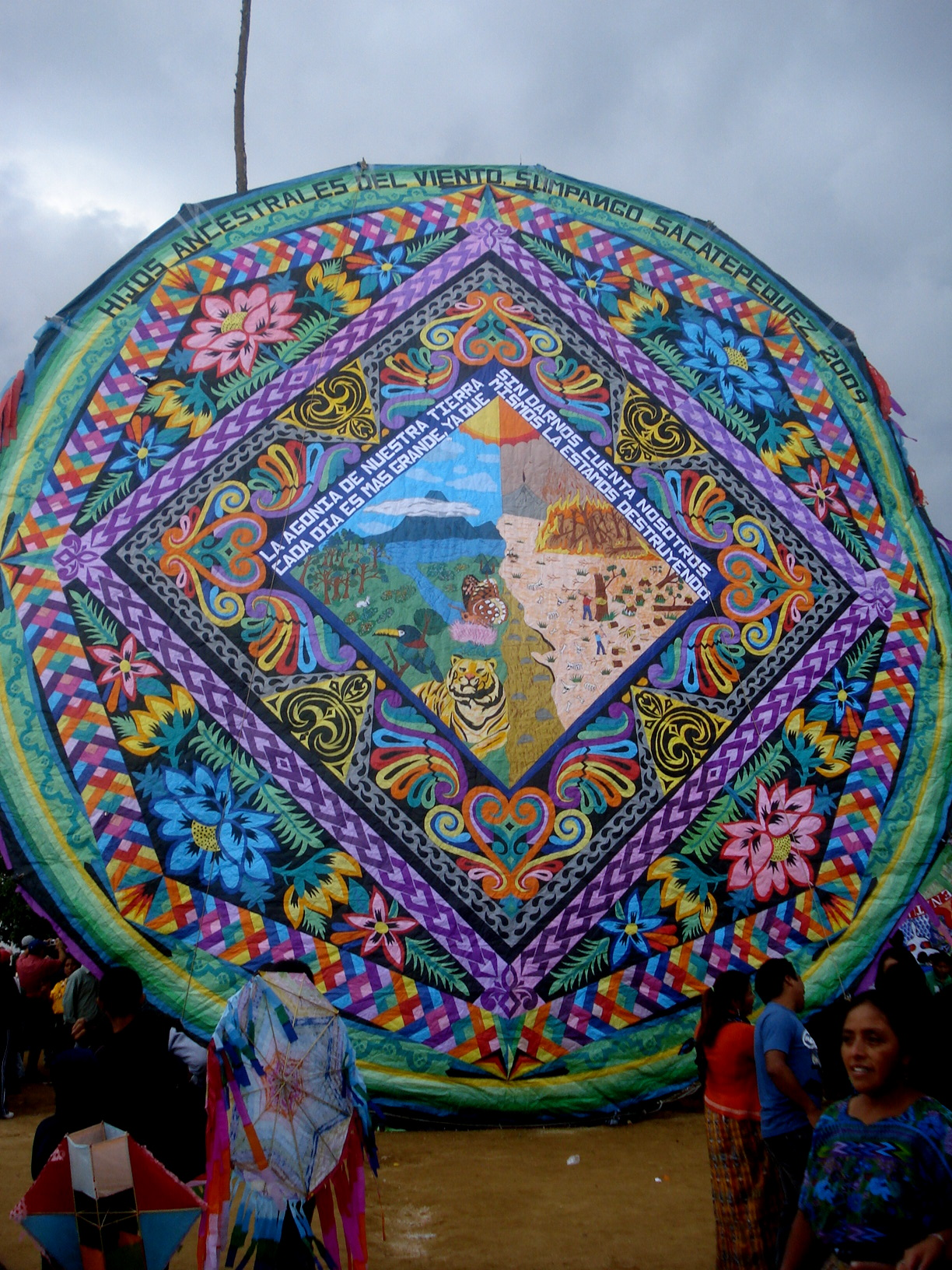
Giant kite (barrilete) at Sumpango, Guatemala

In Guatemala, All Saints' Day is a national holiday. On that day Guatemalans make a special meal called fiambre which is made of cold meats and vegetables; it is customary to visit cemeteries and to leave some of the fiambre for their dead. It is also customary to fly kites to help unite the dead with the living. There are festivals in towns like Santiago Sacatepéquez and Sumpango, where giant colorful kites are flown.

==== Mexico ====
All Saints' Day in Mexico coincides with the first day of the Day of the Dead (Día de Muertos) celebration. It commemorates children who have died (Dia de los Inocentes), and the second day celebrates all deceased adults.

=== Asia ===
==== Philippines ====
Allhallowtide in the Philippines is variously called Undás (from the Spanish Honras, meaning 'honours', as in "with honours"), Todos los Santos (Spanish, 'All Saints'), and sometimes Araw ng mga Patay / Yumao (Tagalog, 'Day of the Dead, passed away'), which incorporates All Saints' Day and All Souls' Day. Filipinos traditionally observe this day by visiting their families' graves to clean and repair the tombs. Prayers for the dead are recited, while offerings are made, the most common being flowers, candles, food, and for Chinese Filipinos, incense and kim. Many also spend the day and ensuing night holding reunions at the graves with feasting and merriment.

==== Pangangaluluwa and Trick-or-treat ====
Though Halloween is usually seen as an American influence, the country's trick-or-treat traditions during Undas are actually much older. This tradition was derived from the pre-colonial tradition of pangangaluluwa. From káluluwâ ('spirit double'), it was a practice of early Filipinos, swathed in blankets, going from house to house, and singing as they pretended to be the spirits of ancestors. If the owner of the house failed to give biko or rice cakes to the nangángalúluwâ, the "spirits" would play tricks (such as stealing slippers or other objects left outside the house, or run off with the family's chickens). Pangángaluluwâ practices are still seen in some rural areas.

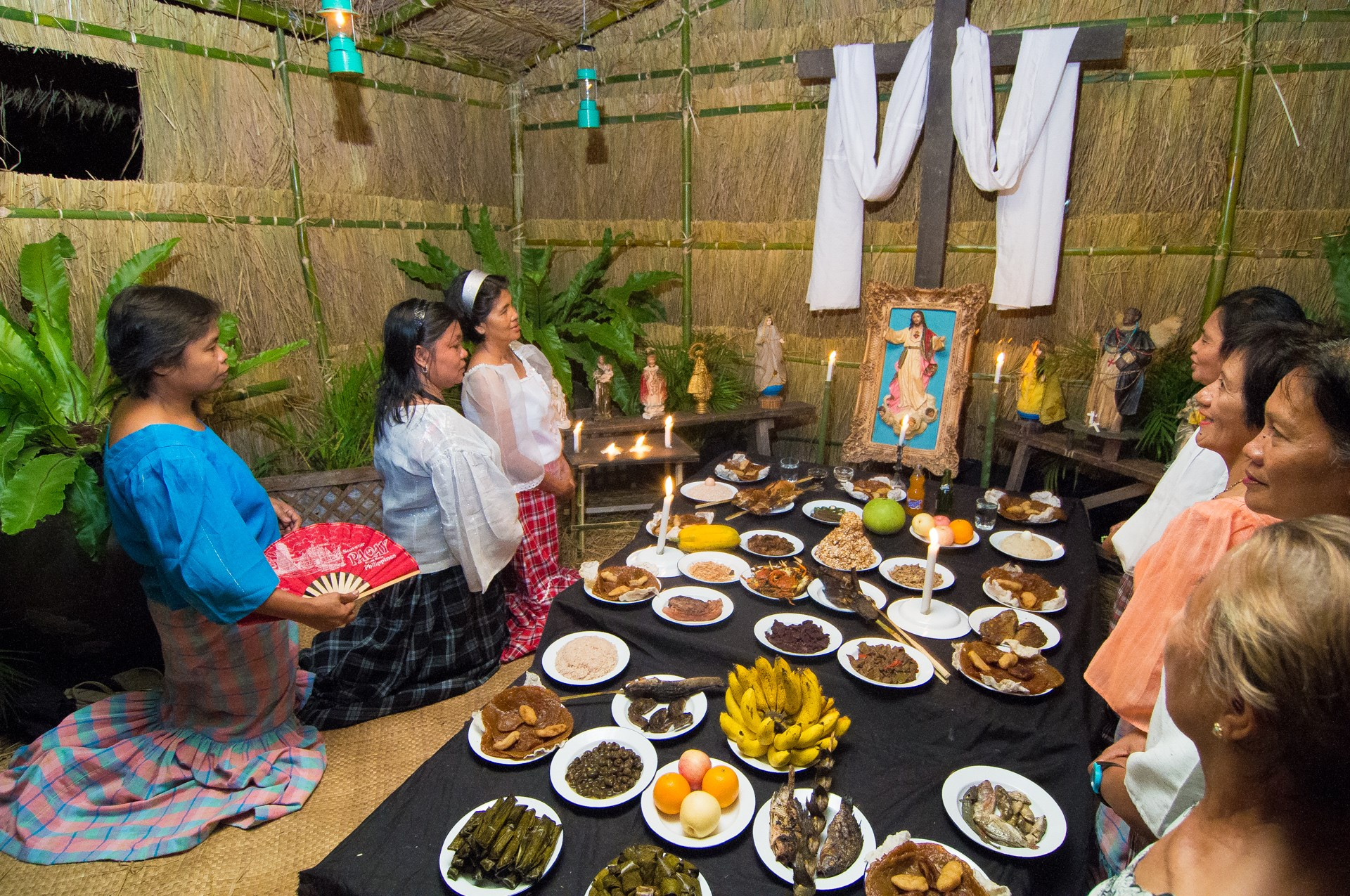
Tumba-tumba, a traditional practice of honoring the dead during All Saints' Day in Paoay, Ilocos Norte, Philippines, featuring átang (food offerings)

===== Cemetery and reunion practices =====
During Undas, families visit the graves of loved ones. It is believed that by going to the cemetery and offering food, candles, flowers, and sometimes incense, the spirits are remembered and appeased. Contrary to common belief, this visitation practice is not an imported tradition. Prior to the use of coffins, pre-colonial Filipinos were already visiting burial caves throughout the archipelago as confirmed by research conducted by the University of the Philippines. The tradition of atang or hain is also practiced, where food and other offerings are placed at the gravesite. If the family cannot visit, a specific area in the house is set aside for ritual offerings.

The present date of Undas, November 1, is not a pre-colonial observance but an import from Mexico, where it is known as the Day of the Dead. Pre-colonial Filipinos preferred going to the burial caves of the departed occasionally as they believed that aswáng (monster, half-vampire, half-werewolf beings) would take the corpse of the dead if it was not properly guarded. Watching over the body of the dead is called "paglalamay". However, in some communities, this paglalamay tradition is non-existent and is replaced by other pre-colonial traditions unique to each community.

Undas is also seen as a family holiday, where members living elsewhere return to their hometowns to visit ancestral graves. Family members are expected to remain beside the grave for the entire day and socialize with each other to strengthen ties. In some cases, family members going to graves may exceed one hundred people. Fighting in any form is taboo during Undas.

===== Role of children =====
Children are allowed to play with melted candles left at tombs, which they form into wax balls. The round balls symbolize the affirmation that everything goes back to where it began, as the living will return to dust whence it came. In some cases, families also light candles by the front door, their number equivalent to the number of departed loved ones. It is believed that the lights aid the spirits and guide them to the afterlife.

== Holidays ==
November 1 is a fixed date public holiday in Andorra, Austria, Belgium, Benin, Burkina Faso, Burundi, Cape Verde, Central African Republic, Chad, Chile, Colombia, Congo, Croatia, East Timor, France, French Guiana, French Polynesia, Gabon, Guadeloupe, Guatemala, Hungary, Italy, Ivory Coast, Lebanon, Liechtenstein, Lithuania, Luxembourg, Madagascar, Martinique, Mauritius, Peru, Philippines, Poland, Portugal, Saint Barthélemy, Saint Martin, Saint Pierre and Miquelon, San Marino, Senegal, Seychelles, Slovakia, Slovenia, Spain, Togo, the Vatican and Venezuela.

In Belgium, all Sundays are public holidays; should All Saints' Day fall on a Sunday, then a replacement day on a weekday of choice is given. In Monaco, if it falls on a Sunday, the next day is a statutory holiday.

Candles lit at memorial to passed generations and loved ones lying elsewhere in Hietaniemi Cemetery (in Helsinki, Finland) on All Saints' Day

In Finland, Estonia and Sweden, an All Saints public holiday falls on the Saturday during the period between October 31 and November 6. The preceding Friday is a half-holiday in Sweden.

In Montenegro, All Saints' Day is considered a Catholic holiday and is a non-working day for that religious community. In Bosnia and Herzegovina it is a public holiday in the Federation of Bosnia and Herzegovina only.

In Germany All Saints' is a designated quiet day in states of Baden-Württemberg, Bavaria, North Rhine-Westphalia, Rhineland-Palatinate and Saarland. Similarly in Switzerland the following 15 out of 26 cantons have All Saints as a public holiday: Aargau, Appenzell Innerrhoden, Fribourg (partly), Glarus, Jura, Luzern, Nidwalden, Obwalden, Saint Gallen, Solothurn, Schwyz, Ticino, Uri, Valais, and Zug.

Although the European Commission does not set public holidays for its member states, November 1 is a public holiday for the employees of the institutions of the European Union.

In the Philippines, where there are two types of public holidays, All Saints' Day is a fixed date, special holiday.

In India, All Saints' Day is considered a public holiday in the state of Karnataka and a Christian religious holiday throughout the country, which means it is often a common addition to the list of paid holidays at the discretion of the employer, for those that wish to observe. It also happens to coincide with several state foundation days that fall on November 1 in several states: Karnataka Rajyotsava in Karnataka, Andhra Pradesh Day in Andhra Pradesh, Haryana Foundation Day in Haryana, Madhya Pradesh Foundation Day in Madhya Pradesh, Kerala Foundation Day in Kerala and the Chhattisgarh Foundation Day in Chhattisgarh.

In Bolivia, All Saints is a public holiday on November 2, unlike most other countries which celebrate All Souls' Day on that date.

In Antigua and Barbuda, November 1 falls on Independence Day, in Algeria on Revolution Day and in the US Virgin Islands on Liberty Day.

== See also ==
- 1755 Lisbon earthquake which occurred on this day and had a great effect on society and philosophy
- Irish calendar
- Litany of the Saints
