= Public holidays in Martinique =

This is a list of public holidays in Martinique.

Date	Name in English	Name in French	Remarks
1 January	New Year's Day	Jour de l'An	
movable holiday	Easter Monday	Lundi de Pâques	
1 May	International Workers' Day	Fête du Travail	
8 May	Victory Day	Fête de la Victoire 1945	
movable holiday	Ascension Day	Ascension	
movable holiday	Whit Monday	Lundi de Pentecôte	
22 May	Abolition Day	Abolition de l'Esclavage	In remembrance of the abolition of slavery.
14 July	National Day	Fête Nationale	
21 July	Schoelcher Day	Fête Victor Schœlcher	In remembrance of his contributions on the abolition of slavery.
15 August	Assumption Day	Assomption	
1 November	All Saints' Day	Toussaint	
11 November	Armistice Day	Armistice	
25 December	Christmas Day	Noël	

In addition, private sector often take these holidays (jour chômé d'usage in France) which are not official holidays.

Date	Name in English	Name in French	Remarks
Movable holidays	Carnival	Carnaval	Often take 3 days, the final day lies on Ash Wednesday
movable holiday	Mid-Lent	Mi-Carême	
movable holiday	Good Friday		Often observed by banking sector
