= Satires 2.5 (Horace) =

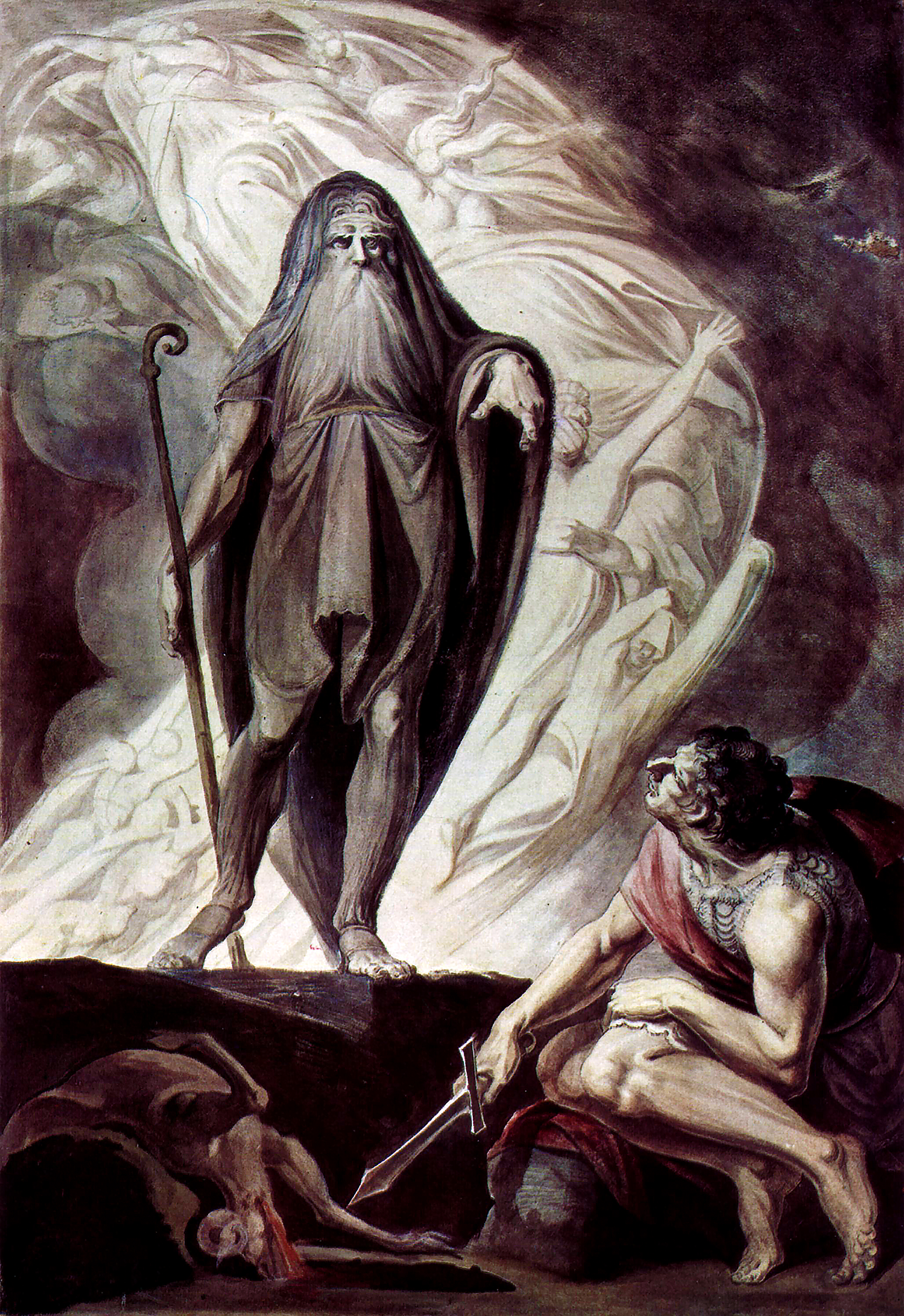
Tiresias appears to Odysseus during the nekyia of Odyssey xi, in this watercolor with tempera by the Anglo-Swiss painter Johann Heinrich Füssli, c. 1780-85

Published around 30 BCE, the second book of Satires is a series of poems composed in dactylic hexameter by the Roman poet Horace. Satires 2.5 stands out in the work for its unique analysis of legacy hunting.

== Plot summary ==
Horace's Satire Book II, Satire V is poem about a discussion between Ulysses and Tiresias that is presented as a continuation of their interaction in the underworld in Book 11 of Homer's Odyssey. Ulysses is concerned that he will have no wealth once he returns to Ithaca because the suitors will have squandered the contents of his storehouses. Stating bluntly that breeding and character are meaningless without wealth, he asks Tiresias for any suggestions on how to rebuild his prosperity. Tiresias suggests that Ulysses try his hand at legacy hunting, and gives examples of characters through history that have ingratiated themselves with the affluent in order to be named as benefactors in their will. Despite Ulysses’ skepticism, Tiresias asserts the plan's merit and provides examples of how to curry favor.

Outline of the Poem

A. 1-22 Introduction
B. 23-44 Ensnarement of Victim. Flattery
C. 45-69 Precautions. Failure
D. 70-98 Maintenance of Hold over Victim. Flattery
E. 99-110 Conclusions. Success

== Analysis ==
The structure of the poem places the majority of focus on section C, especially the story of Nasica and Coranus. The poem draws from the imagery of hunting, referring to the legacy-seeker as adept with snares and to his prey as an unwary tunny fish. Most importantly, in the poem “nothing suggests that the typical senex has a mind or will of his own.”. The victim is utterly objectified and reduced to a feeble creature that the captator can exploit.

On a linguistic level, the poem features very colloquial and expressive language. “‘breeding and character without assets are vilior alga--more worthless than seaweed.’ Tell me, says Ulysses, how I can rake together ‘piles of cash’-- aeris acervos.”. The analogies in the text are similarly graphic, as in the story of the over-insistent heir in Thebes who was required by the will of his benefactor to carry her oil-soaked slippery carcass on his shoulders during the funeral procession.

Satire 2.5 is often thought of as the least “Horatian” of the Satires and is often compared to works by Juvenal, a poet of the 1st century AD. Juvenal’s poems focus on the perversions of man and hint at Man’s loss of “his highest potentialities”. Many scholars acknowledge this cynicism in Satire 2.5 and see a connection between the two authors. As Shackleton Bailey writes, “Uniquely for Horace, it concerns a particular social malpractice (touting for legacies), and its mordant humour has reminded many readers of Juvenal.”

== Characterizations ==
=== Ulysses ===
Horace diverges from classical portrayals of Ulysses in this satire. Ulysses is a heroic Greek protagonist, but in this poem he eschews the importance of noble bearing in favor of temporal riches. Michael Roberts writes that “the theme of perversion of human values runs throughout the satire,” and this is especially relevant to the destitute Ulysses. Horace’s choice of an established epic hero to request Tiresias’ scheming advice displays a distortion of Greek heroic values. The poem also distorts the meaning of xenia, reducing the powerful bonds of host-guest friendship down to a calculated exchange of flattery for services. Although Ulysses is mostly silent after line 23, it is implied that he has been swayed by the pragmatism of Tiresias’ words.

=== Tiresias ===
Horace’s characterization of Tiresias is strikingly different from other authors. Instead of portraying him as a great prophet, Horace characterizes him as a shady figure, quick to reveal the secret to making money. With this, the characterization of Tiresias creates a moral tension between the paragon prophet so highly respected in ancient literature and the shady truth-teller that reveals the inner workings of legacy hunting. It is from this tension that the satirical nature of the work is derived.

=== Penelope ===
Horace also takes a noticeably different tack than other Roman and Greek poets with regard to his characterization of Penelope. Horace introduces her first as the virtuous wife she is typically characterized as in lines 77-78. Ulysses claims that his chaste wife would never betray their vows of monogamy, but Tiresias counters that she is chaste only because the suitors are more motivated by consuming Ulysses’ bountiful stores than by sex.

”But if you make her a partner/ and let her taste some cash at an old fellow’s expense,/ there’ll be no holding her. She’ll be like a dog with a juicy bone.”

Penelope, classically a bastion of chastity, is hereby portrayed as corruptible like any other woman.
