= Public holidays in Saint Pierre and Miquelon =

This is a list of public holidays in Saint Pierre and Miquelon. Official public holidays in Saint Pierre and Miquelon are the same as those in France and are regulated by Article L222-1 du Code du travail (Labour Code).

Date	Name in English	Name in French	Remarks
January 1	New Year's Day	Jour de l'An	
movable holiday	Easter Monday	Lundi de Pâques	
May 1	Labour Day	Fête du Travail	
May 8	Victory Day	Fête de la Victoire 1945	
movable holiday	Ascension Day	Ascension	
movable holiday	Whit Monday	Lundi de Pentecôte	
July 14	National Day	Fête Nationale	
August 15	Assumption Day	Assomption	
November 1	All Saints' Day	Toussaint	
November 11	Armistice Day	Armistice	
December 25	Christmas Day	Noël	
