= Public holidays in San Marino =

This is a list of public holidays in San Marino.

== Official holidays ==
=== Public holidays and festivals ===
Date	Name	Explanation
1 January	New Year's Day	Festival marking the beginning of the new year
6 January	Epiphany	Commemorates the visit of the three wise men or magi to the infant Jesus
5 February	Feast of Saint Agatha	Commemoration of Saint Agatha, co-patroness of the Republic after the country was liberated from foreign rule on her feast day in 1740
Variable, the first Sunday after the first full moon after the vernal equinox	Easter	Resurrection of Jesus
Variable, the Monday after Easter Sunday	Easter Monday	Monday after Easter day
25 March	Anniversary of the Arengo	Anniversary of the 1906 Arengo and the Festa delle Milizie (Feast of the Militants)
1 May	Labour Day	Celebration of workers and employees
Variable, the first Thursday after Trinity Sunday	Corpus Christi	Commemoration of the body and blood of Jesus Christ
28 July	Anniversary of the Fall of Fascism	Commemoration of the fall of the Sammarinese Fascist Party
15 August	Ferragosto (Assumption)	Commemoration of the Virgin Mary's assumption into heaven
3 September	The Feast of Saint Marinus and the Republic	National feast of Saint Marinus (San Marino), celebrating the origin of the Republic in 301
1 November	All Saints' Day	Feast dedicated to all saints
2 November	All Souls' Day	Remembrance of all those who gave their lives for San Marino in war
8 December	Immaculate Conception	Remembrance of the Virgin Mary's conception without original sin
24 December	Christmas Eve	Day before the commemoration of the birth of Jesus
25 December	Christmas Day	Birth of Jesus
26 December	Saint Stephen's Day	Commemoration of the death of Saint Stephen, the first Christian martyr
31 December	New Year's Eve	Celebration which closes and marks the end of the year
