= Pangangaluluwa =

Annual Tagalog tradition

Pangangaluluwa (literally 'souling') is a Tagalog tradition observed annually on October 31 during All Hallows' Eve.

== Observance ==
The practice of pangangaluluwa is folk tradition where people visit houses at night to sing songs related to All Saints' Day and All Souls' Day to solicit for gifts. The practice is more common in the rural areas and is often done by children or teenagers.

According to the National Commission for Culture and the Arts (NCCA), the practice is usually done on October 31, the day before the "Day of the Dead" (Araw ng mga Patay), also known as All Saints' Day. As per tradition, participants of pangangaluluwa solicit people in front of their houses similar to what is done in harana and karoling and sings songs pretending to be lost souls in purgatory. Visited homes are expected to give kakanin or something else which the "lost souls" could bring back to the world of the dead.

The NCCA also describes a superstition associated with pangangaluluwa. According to tradition, the door which connects the world of the living and dead opens during All Saints Day which causes the souls who died on November 1 to return to the world of the living. Kakanin or various sticky rice cakes as well as food products made from sweet potato and purple yam is usually prepared as a tribute to the souls who are said to be hungry for food and attention.

The NCCA has cited pangangaluluwa as one of the evidence of Filipino belief in the afterlife as well as the existence of relations between the living and the souls of the dead.

In Pangasinan, the observance is called panagkamarerwa, which came from kamarerwa which means soul in the Pangasinan language.

=== In Sariaya, Quezon ===
In the town of Sariaya, Quezon, pangangaluluwa is often observed from October 27 to 28. It was usually held on November 1 after families have returned to their houses from their cemetery visits, according to an account of a resident senior citizen born in 1920. A dying tradition in the town, it was revived by the local tourism council in 2005 as an annual fundraising for the local government's belen festival in December and the development of the local tourism in general. The modern practice of pangangaluluwa in Sariaya town involves children dressing in scary costumes similar to the Western practice of trick-or-treating.
