= Public holidays in Lebanon =

The primary national holiday is Independence Day which is celebrated on November 22.

== National holidays ==
Date	English Name	Arabic Name	French Name	Remarks
January 1	New Year's Day	رأس السنة	Nouvel an
January 6	Epiphany and Armenian Christmas	عيد الظهور الإلهي عيد الميلاد - الأرمن الأرثودكس	Épiphanie; Noël Arménien	The latter holiday was officially recognized in Lebanon in 2003. It is exclusively celebrated by Armenians in Lebanon.
February 9	Saint Maroun's Day	عيد مار مارون	Fête de Saint-Maron	The holiday is celebrated by the Maronites, hence the name.
February 14	Rafic Hariri Memorial Day	يوم اغتيال رفيق الحريري	Jour de l'assassinat de Rafic Hariri	National day of mourning remembering the Assassination of Rafic Hariri in 2005.
March 25	Feast of the Annunciation	عيد البشارة	Fête de l'Annonciation	Observed by both Christians and Muslims
Friday immediately before Easter Sunday	Good Friday	جمعة الآلام	Vendredi Saint	Both the Eastern and Western dates are observed. Also called الجمعة العظيمة in Arabic.
moveable	Easter Sunday	الفصح المجيد	Pâques	Both the Eastern and Western dates are observed.
May 1	Labour Day	عيد العمّال	Fête du Travail
May 25	Resistance and Liberation Day	عيد المقاومة والتحرير	Fête de la Libération et Résistance	Withdrawal of the Israeli Army from Southern Lebanon in 2000.
August 15	Feast of the Assumption	عيد إنتقال العذراء	Assomption de Marie
November 22	Independence Day	عيد الإستقلال	Fête nationale	Lebanon gained its independence from France in 1943.
December 25	Christmas Day	عيد الميلاد	Noël
Dates following the lunar Islamic calendar
1 Muharram	Islamic New Year	رأس السنة الهجرية	Nouvel an islamique	In French, it is also known as 1^{er} Muharram.
10 Muharram	Day of Ashura	ذكرى عاشوراء	Fête de l’Achoura	Maqtal al-Husayn is sometimes read on this day.
12 Rabi' al-awwal	Mawlid	مولد النبي	Mawlid	The holiday is celebrated on 12 Rabi' al-awwal by the Sunnis while it is celebrated on 17 Rabi' al-awwal by the Shi'ites. Also known as mouloud, mouled, maoulide or Mawlid al-Nabi in French.
1 Shawwal	Eid al-Fitr	عيد الفطر	Aïd el-Fitr	The holiday lasts for three days until 3 Shawwal. Also known as Id-ul-Fitr, Eid, and the Festival of the Breaking of the Fast.
10 Dhu al-Hijjah	Eid al-Adha	عيد الأضحى	Aïd el-Kebir	The holiday lasts three days, ending on 13 Dhu al-Hijjah. Also known as la Fête du sacrifice, Aïd al Adha, or Eid el-Kebir in French.

== Other Holidays ==
Date	English name	Arabic name	French name	Remarks
February 15	St. Vartan Day			Only celebrated by the Armenian population in Lebanon.
March 9	Teachers' Day	عيد المعلم	Fête des professeurs	The holiday ends on March 9.
March 21	Mother's Day	عيد الأم	Fête des Mères	The holiday also falls on the Vernal Equinox.
May 6	Martyrs' Day	عيد الشهداء	Jour des martyrs	Syrian and Lebanese national holiday commemorating the Syrian and Lebanese nationalists executed in Damascus and Beirut on May 6, 1916 by Jamal Pasha.
November 1	All Saints' Day	عيد جميع القديسين	Toussaint
moveable	Ascension Day	عيد الصعود	Jour de l'Ascension
September 8	Nativity of Mary	ميلاد مريم العذراء	Nativité de Marie
December 4	Saint Barbara's Day	عيد البربارة	Jour de Barbara

== See also ==
- Culture of Lebanon
