= Jennifer Alexander =

Canadian ballerina (1972–2007)

Jennifer Carrie Alexander (August 15, 1972 – December 2, 2007) was a Canadian ballet dancer.

Alexander was born in Calgary, Alberta. She studied at the Alberta Ballet Company and at the Royal Winnipeg Ballet, where she danced from 1991 to 1993. She appeared in the Broadway production of The Red Shoes in 1993 and in Carousel in 1994. In 1994, she joined the corps de ballet of the American Ballet Theatre. Her first marriage was to Canadian and former New York City Ballet dancer Andrew Robertson. She married fellow ABT dancer Julio Bragado-Young on 28 July 2007.

Alexander, Bragado-Young and a third dancer were returning to Manhattan after Bragado-Young had performed in The Nutcracker in Williamsport, Pennsylvania when they came upon a multiple-vehicle collision on Route 3, in East Rutherford, New Jersey. After they exited their car, Bragado-Young then Alexander were each struck by an out-of-control vehicle skidding on the icy road. He broke his leg; she died at the scene.

The American Ballet Theatre created The Jennifer Alexander Scholarship to acknowledge an outstanding corps de ballet dancer.
