= Tomasz Suwary =

Polish footballer

Personal information
- Full name: Tomasz Suwary
- Date of birth: 15 August 1974 (age 52)
- Place of birth: Gorzów Wielkopolski, Poland
- Height: 1.81 m (5 ft 11 in)
- Position: Striker

Youth career
- –1992: Stilon Gorzów

Senior career*
Years	Team	Apps	(Gls)
1992–1995	Stilon Gorzów	74	(10)
1995–1998	Amica Wronki	61	(6)
1998–1999	Śląsk Wrocław		
1999–2000	FC Sachsen Leipzig		
2000	Lech Poznań		
2000–2001	Tennis Borussia Berlin	7	(1)
2001–2005	Berliner FC Dynamo		
2005	Diagoras	6	(0)
2005–2007	Berliner FC Dynamo	21	(5)
2007	VSG Altglienicke		
2016–2018	Stilon Gorzów II		
2018–2020	Róża Różanki	4	(0)
- * Club domestic league appearances and goals

Tomasz Suwary (born 15 August 1974) is a Polish former professional footballer who played as a striker.

Suwary made a total of 61 appearances in the Ekstraklasa for Amica Wronki during his playing career.

== Honours ==
Amica Wronki

- Polish Cup: 1997–98

Stilon Gorzów II

- Klasa B Gorzów Wielkopolski II: 2016–17

Róża Różanki

- Klasa A Gorzów Wielkopolski I: 2018–19
