= Public holidays in Liechtenstein =

This is a list of public holidays in Liechtenstein.

Holidays
Date	English name	German name	Notes
1 January	New Year's Day	Neujahr	
2 January	Berchtold's Day	Berchtoldstag	Bank holiday only
6 January	Epiphany	Drei Könige	
2 February	Candlemas	Mariä Lichtmess	
movable	Shrove Tuesday	Fasnachtsdienstag	Bank holiday only 17 February 2026; 9 February 2027
19 March	Saint Joseph's Day	Josefstag	
movable	Good Friday	Karfreitag	Bank holiday only 3 April 2026; 26 March 2027
movable	Easter Sunday	Ostersonntag	5 April 2026; 28 March 2027
movable	Easter Monday	Ostermontag	6 April 2026; 29 March 2027
1 May	Labour Day	Tag der Arbeit	
movable	Ascension Day	Auffahrt	14 May 2026; 6 May 2027
movable	Whit Sunday	Pfingstsonntag	24 May 2026; 16 May 2027
movable	Whit Monday	Pfingstmontag	25 May 2026; 17 May 2027
movable	Corpus Christi	Fronleichnam	4 June 2026; 27 May 2027
15 August	National Day	Staatsfeiertag	
8 September	Nativity of Mary	Maria Geburt	
1 November	All Saints Day	Allerheiligen	
8 December	Immaculate Conception	Maria Empfängnis	
24 December	Christmas Eve	Heiliger Abend	Bank holiday only
25 December	Christmas Day	Weihnachten	
26 December	Saint Stephen's Day	Stefanstag	
31 December	New Year's Eve	Silvester	Bank holiday only
