= Thomas-Alfred Bernier =

Canadian politician

The Honourable Thomas-Alfred Bernier
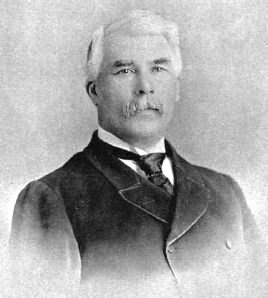

Canadian Senator from Manitoba
- In office October 27, 1892 – December 30, 1908
- Appointed by: John Abbott

Personal details
- Born: August 15, 1844 Henryville, Canada East
- Died: December 30, 1908 (aged 64) Saint Boniface, Manitoba, Canada
- Party: Conservative

Thomas-Alfred Bernier (August 15, 1844 – December 30, 1908) was a Canadian journalist, lawyer, and politician.

== Early life ==
Born in Henryville, Quebec, to parents Thomas Bernier and Julia Létourneau, Bernier was educated at the College of St. Hyacinthe. He was married in August 1871 to Julia Malvina and they had ten children, three of whom died in infancy.

== Career ==
He worked in journalism and was a lawyer who practiced for some years in St. John d'Iberville, and in 1880, he moved to Manitoba. He was Superintendent of Education for the Catholic schools in Manitoba from 1881 to 1890 until public funding for the Catholic schools was abolished. From 1881 to 1893, he was Registrar of the University of Manitoba. He was a member of the Executive Committee of the Provincial Agricultural Board, and Chairman of the Eastern Judicial District Board. Bernier was Mayor of St. Boniface in 1883, 1884, 1886, 1891, and 1897. He was also a Commissioner to revise the municipal law, and a Commissioner to inquire into the working of the law in connection with the sale of Métis lands.

In 1892, he was appointed to the Senate on the advice of John Joseph Caldwell Abbott representing the senatorial division of St-Boniface, Manitoba. A Conservative, he died in office in 1908 after serving for 16 years.
