= Carl Joachim Classen =

German classical scholar (1928–2013)

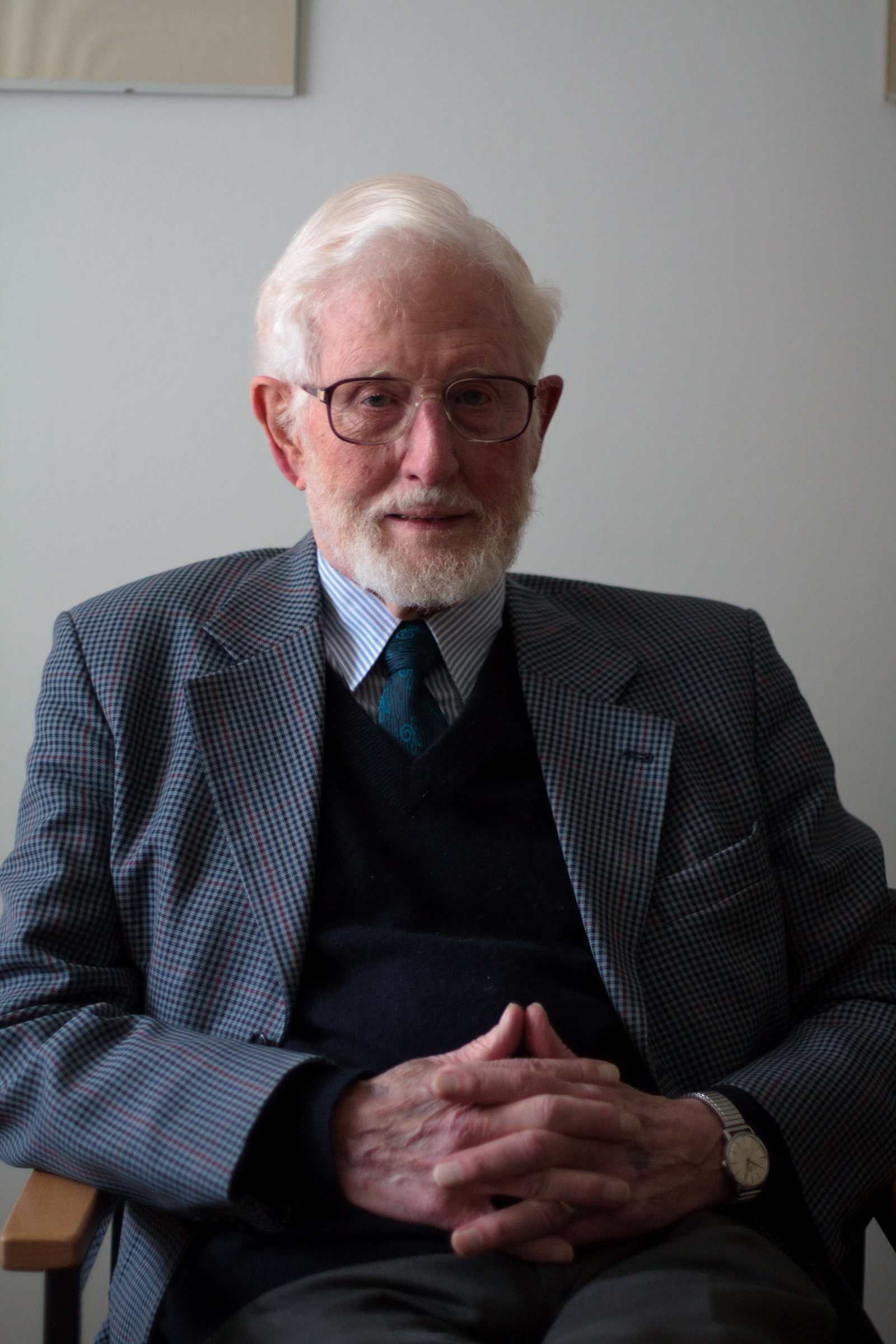
- Born: August 15, 1928; Hamburg, Germany
- Died: September 29, 2013 (aged 85)

Academic background
- Education: University of Göttingen; University of Oxford; University of Hamburg

Academic work
- Discipline: Classics
- Institutions: Technische Universität Berlin; University of Würzburg; University of Göttingen

Carl Joachim Classen (15 August 1928 - 29 September 2013) was a German classical scholar.

== Biography ==
Classen studied classics at Göttingen and Hamburg. His academic teachers include Ernst Zinn and Bruno Snell in Hamburg and Kurt Latte in Göttingen. After being promoted to Dr. phil. in 1952 he took the first and second state examination in 1952 and 1956, respectively. He attained the B. Litt. at the University of Oxford in 1956 and worked as a lecturer of classics at the University of Ibadan for three years. After his return to Germany (in 1959) he worked as a lecturer at the Göttingen university, completing his Habilitation in 1961.

From 1966 on Classen held classics chairs at three universities: In 1966 he was called to one of the two newly instituted chair of classics at the Technische Universität Berlin. From there he went to Würzburg in 1969, until going to Göttingen in 1973 where he stayed the remainder of his career until his death in 2013.

As a classicist, Classen had an exceptional international reputation. He was invited as visiting professor to the University of Texas at Austin (1967/68) and as visiting member to the Institute for Advanced Study (1975). He also was visiting professor in Changchun (1992), Tartu (1994 and 1996), Rome (1995 and 1997) and visiting fellow at All Souls College, Oxford (1980) and Merton College, Oxford (1995). In 2000, the University of Tartu awarded him the honorary degree of Dr. phil.

His main scientific interests included Ancient Historiography, Greek and Roman Rhetorics, Roman Satire, Humanism and the History of Classical Scholarship. He was the author and editor of several monographs and essays on those subjects, his works being published in German, English, Serbian and Estonian.

Classen died on 29 September 2013, aged 85. He was survived by his wife Roswitha and their three sons.

== Major writings ==
- Untersuchungen zu Platons Jagdbildern. Hamburg 1951. Revised edition, Berlin 1960
- Sprachliche Deutung als Triebkraft platonischen und sokratischen Philosophierens. Munich 1959
- Sophistik. Darmstadt 1976
- Die Stadt im Spiegel der Descriptiones und Laudes urbium in der antiken und mittelalterlichen Literatur bis zum Ende des zwölften Jahrhunderts. Hildesheim/New York 1980
- Recht – Rhetorik – Politik: Untersuchungen zu Ciceros rhetorischer Strategie. Darmstadt 1985
- Probleme der Lukrezforschung. Hildesheim/Zurich/New York 1986
- Ansätze: Beiträge zum Verständnis der frühgriechischen Philosophie. Würzburg/Amsterdam 1986
- Zu Heinrich Bebels Leben und Schriften. Göttingen 1996
- Zur Literatur und Gesellschaft der Römer. Stuttgart 1998
- Rhetorical criticism of the New Testament. Tübingen 2000
- Antike Rhetorik im Zeitalter des Humanismus. Munich/Leipzig 2003
- Vorbilder – Werte – Normen in den homerischen Epen. Berlin/New York 2008.
- Aretai i virtutes: o vrednosnim predstavama i idealima kod Grka i Rimljana. Belgrade 2008
- Herrscher, Bürger und Erzieher: Beobachtungen zu den Reden des Isokrates. Hildesheim/Zurich/New York 2010
- Aretai und Virtutes: Untersuchungen zu den Wertvorstellungen der Griechen und Römer. Berlin/New York 2010
