= We Three Kings =

Epiphany carol

Three Kings of Orient
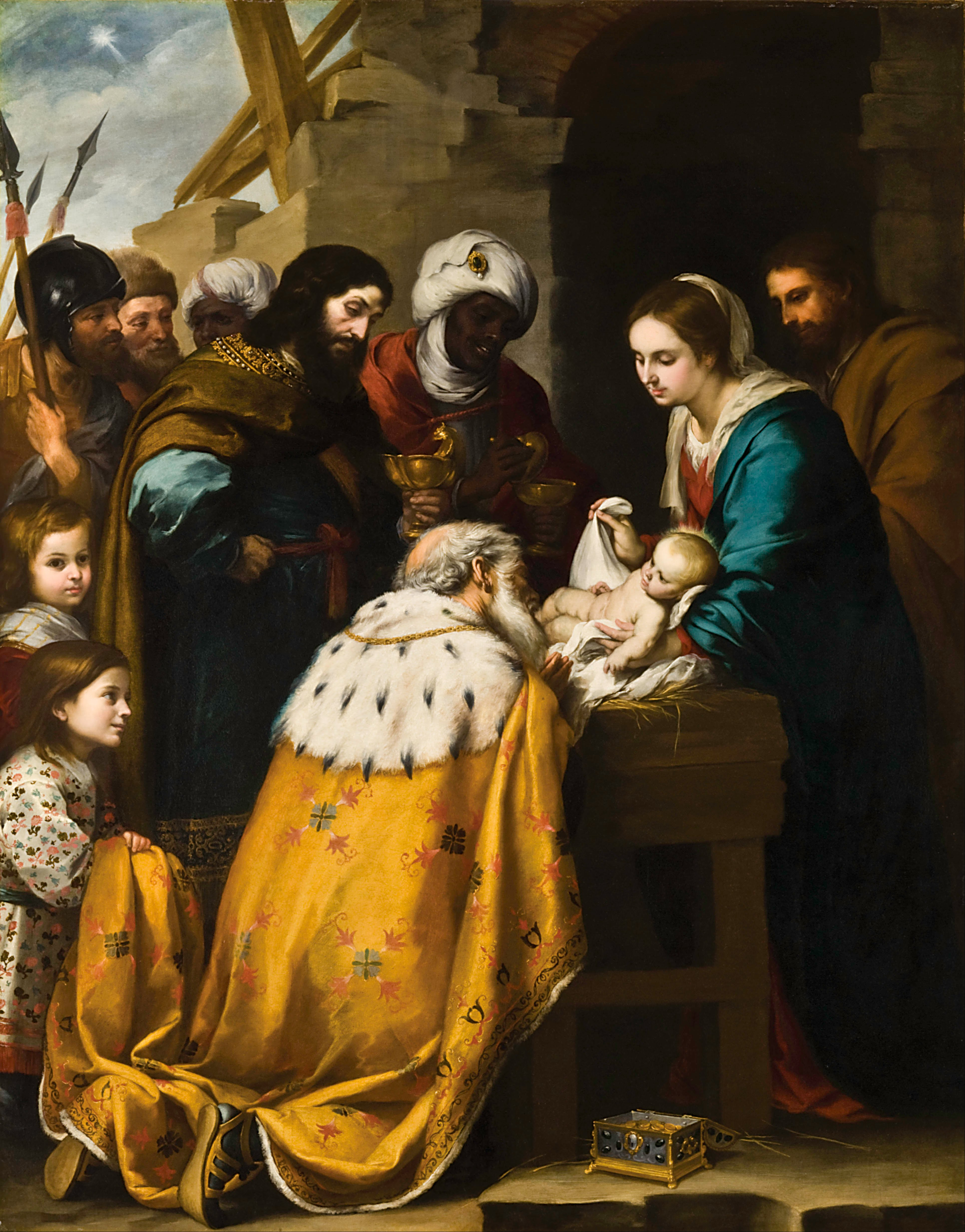
- The Adoration of the Magi by Bartolomé Esteban Murillo, about 1655–1660. Toledo Museum of Art, Toledo, Ohio.
- Genre: Christmas carol
- Written: 1857
- Text: John Henry Hopkins Jr.
- Based on: Matthew 2:1
- Meter: 8.8.4.4.6 with refrain
- Melody: "Three Kings of Orient" by John Henry Hopkins Jr.
- Published: 1863

"We Three Kings", original title "Three Kings of Orient", also known as "We Three Kings of Orient Are" or "The Quest of the Magi", is a Christmas carol that was written by John Henry Hopkins Jr. in 1857. At the time of composing the carol, Hopkins served as the rector of Christ Episcopal Church in Williamsport, Pennsylvania, and he wrote the carol for a Christmas pageant in New York City. It became the first widely popular Christmas carol written in America.

== Lyrics ==
Three Kings of Orient

All

We Three Kings of Orient are,
Bearing gifts we traverse afar,
Field and fountain,
Moor and mountain,
Following yonder Star.

Refrain

O Star of Wonder, Star of Night,
Star with Royal Beauty bright,
Westward leading,
Still proceeding,
Guide us to Thy perfect Light.

Gaspard

Born a King on Bethlehem plain,
Gold I bring to crown Him again,
King for ever,
Ceasing never
Over us all to reign.
Refrain

Melchior

Frankincense to offer have I,
Incense owns a Deity nigh:
Prayer and praising
All men raising,
Worship Him God on High.
Refrain

Balthazar

Myrrh is mine; its bitter perfume
Breathes a life of gathering gloom;—
Sorrowing, sighing,
Bleeding, dying,
Sealed in the stone-cold tomb.
Refrain

All

Glorious now behold Him arise,
King, and God, and Sacrifice;
Heav'n sings Hallelujah:
Hallelujah the earth replies.
Refrain

=== Composition ===
John Henry Hopkins Jr. organized the carol in such a way that three male voices would each sing a solo verse in order to correspond with the three kings. The first and last verses of the carol are sung together by all three as "verses of praise", while the intermediate verses are sung individually with each king describing the gift he was bringing. The refrain proceeds to praise the beauty of the Star of Bethlehem. The Magi's solos are typically not observed during contemporary performances of the carol.

The carol's melody has been described as "sad" and "shifting" in nature. Because of this, it highly resembles a song from the Middle Ages and Middle Eastern music, both of which it has been frequently compared to.

=== Context ===
The carol centers around the Biblical Magi, who visited Jesus as a child in a manger (Matthew 2:1) sometime after his Nativity and gave him gifts of gold, frankincense, and myrrh while paying homage to him. Though the event is recounted in the Gospel of Matthew, there are no further details given in the New Testament with regards to their names, the number of Magi who were present, or whether they were even royal. There are, however, verses in the Old Testament that foretell of the visitors: Isaiah 60:6: "The wealth of the nations will come to you. A multitude of camels will cover you. The young camels of Midian and Ephah; All those from Sheba will come; They will bring gold and frankincense, and will bear good news of the praises of the Lord." (New American Standard Bible), and two selections from the Psalms – Psalm 72:10: "The kings of Tarshish and of the isles shall pay tribute, and the kings of Arabia and Saba offer gifts" and Psalm 72:15: "...and may there be given to him gold from Arabia" (New American Standard Bible). Hence, the names of the Magi—Melchior, Caspar, and Balthazar—and their status as kings from the Orient are legendary and based on tradition. The number three stems from the fact that there were three separate gifts that were given. The solo verses and final verse make explicit a tradition according to which the three gifts symbolize three aspects of Jesus, as "King" (gold, representing wealth and power) and "God" (incense, representing worship) and "sacrifice" (myrrh, used to embalm the dead).

== Background and influence ==
At the time he was writing "We Three Kings" in 1857, John Henry Hopkins Jr. was serving as the rector of Christ Episcopal Church in Williamsport, Pennsylvania. Although he originally worked as a journalist for a New York newspaper and studied to become a lawyer, he chose to join the clergy upon graduating from the University of Vermont. Hopkins studied at the General Theological Seminary in New York City and after graduating and being ordained a deacon in 1850, he became its first music teacher five years later, holding the post until 1857 alongside his ministry in the Episcopal Church.

During his final year of teaching at the seminary, Hopkins wrote "We Three Kings" for a Christmas pageant held at the college. It was noteworthy that Hopkins composed both the lyrics and music; contemporary carol composers usually wrote either the lyrics or music but not both. Originally titled "Three Kings of Orient", it was sung within his circle of family and friends. Because of the popularity it achieved among them, Hopkins decided to publish the carol in 1863 in his book Carols, Hymns, and Songs. It became the first Christmas carol originating from the United States to achieve widespread popularity, as well as the first to be featured in Christmas Carols Old and New, a collection of carols that was published in the United Kingdom. In 1916, the carol was printed in the hymnal for the Episcopal Church; that year's edition was the first to have a separate section for Christmas songs. "We Three Kings" was also included in The Oxford Book of Carols published in 1928, which praised the song as "one of the most successful of modern composed carols".

== In popular music ==
Jazz, rock, and reggae musicians recorded "We Three Kings".

- Percy Faith (1958)
- Ramsey Lewis (1964)
- The Beach Boys (1964)
- Patti Smith (1997)
- Jethro Tull (2003) "We Five Kings"
- Blondie (2009)

In the televised cartoon A Claymation Christmas Celebration (1987), the Three Kings sing the verses in traditional choral style, while their camels perform the chorus as a doo-wop song. The kings were voiced by Dan Sachs, Jim Steinberger, and Pat Harryman, and the camels by Ron Tinsley and Patric J. Miller, the arrangement was written by Miller.

== Parodies ==
Since the early 1950s, the carol has been parodied by British and American children. The subject of the lyrics varies widely depending upon the region. One well-known parody involves the three kings smoking explosive rubber cigars; another involves them following yonder star in/on a taxi, car, and scooter. "We Four Beatles" involves John Lennon, Paul McCartney, and George Harrison following Ringo Starr in/on the aforementioned vehicles.

== See also ==
- List of Christmas carols
