= Protasius =

Protasius (anglicized Protase) may refer to:

- Protasius (martyr)
- Protasius (bishop of Milan), reigned 328–343, saint
- Protasius, an archbishop of Tarragona in 637–646
- Protasius (bishop of Lausanne) (died c. 650)
- Protasius of Boskowitz and Černahora (died 1482), bishop of Olomouc
- Protase Rugambwa, Tanzanian Catholic cardinal
