= I Sing a Song of the Saints of God =

Christian hymn

- Hymn
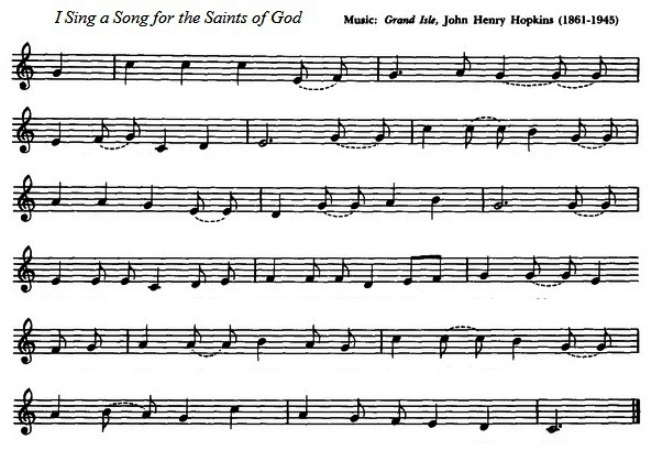
- Text: by Lesbia Scott
- Melody: by John H. Hopkins (tune to "Grand Isle")
- Published: 1929

"I Sing a Song of the Saints of God" is a Christian hymn written in Britain by Lesbia Scott and first published in 1929. The hymn is little-known in Britain, not featuring in the Anglican New English Hymnal, but has become very popular in the United States – particularly in the Episcopal Church, where it has been incorporated into the Episcopal Hymnal 1940. The hymn is especially recommended for corporate worship on All Saints Day.

== The story behind the hymn ==
Lesbia Scott (1898–1986) composed a number of children's hymns which she sang to her own children as a young mother in her twenties. She wrote both the words and the tunes and in 1929 published them in a collection, Everyday Hymns For Little Children, which she also illustrated. Each hymn was devised for a different occasion, and one of them, "Saints' Days", found its way to the United States and was set to a new tune ("Grand Isle") composed especially for it by retired Episcopal priest John H. Hopkins, Jr. (1861-1945) who was the son of the Rev. Theodore Austin Hopkins and the grandson of the first bishop of Vermont, also named John Henry Hopkins; and nephew of John Henry Hopkins Jr., author and composer of "We Three Kings of Orient Are".

"Grand Isle" was written in 1940 and named for the community on the island of the same name in Lake Champlain in Vermont where Hopkins lived in his retirement.

In this setting it was incorporated into the Episcopal Hymnal 1940, under the title of its first line. It has been retained in the subsequent The Hymnal 1982 as Hymn #293, after its proposed removal for "lack of theological profundity" prompted a letter-writing campaign to keep it.

The hymn also appears in the 1974 Book of Worship for United States Forces as Hymn #444 and in the United Methodist 1989 Hymnal as Hymn #712 (with some altered words), the 1990 Presbyterian Hymnal, and the NACCC's 2006 Hymns for a Pilgrim People.

== Popularity ==
The hymn remains a popular favourite with American churchgoers who have grown up with it. In a 2003 survey of 'desert island' hymns run by the website Anglicans Online, the hymn was voted 14th.

The hymn was used as the signature tune of the BBC Scotland radio programme Fireside Sunday School in the 1960s running through until December 1970 when the programme ended. It was sung by the Scottish Junior Singers who participated in the programme.
