= Oratorio di San Protaso =

Church building in Milan, Italy

Coordinates: 45°27′16″N 9°09′00″E

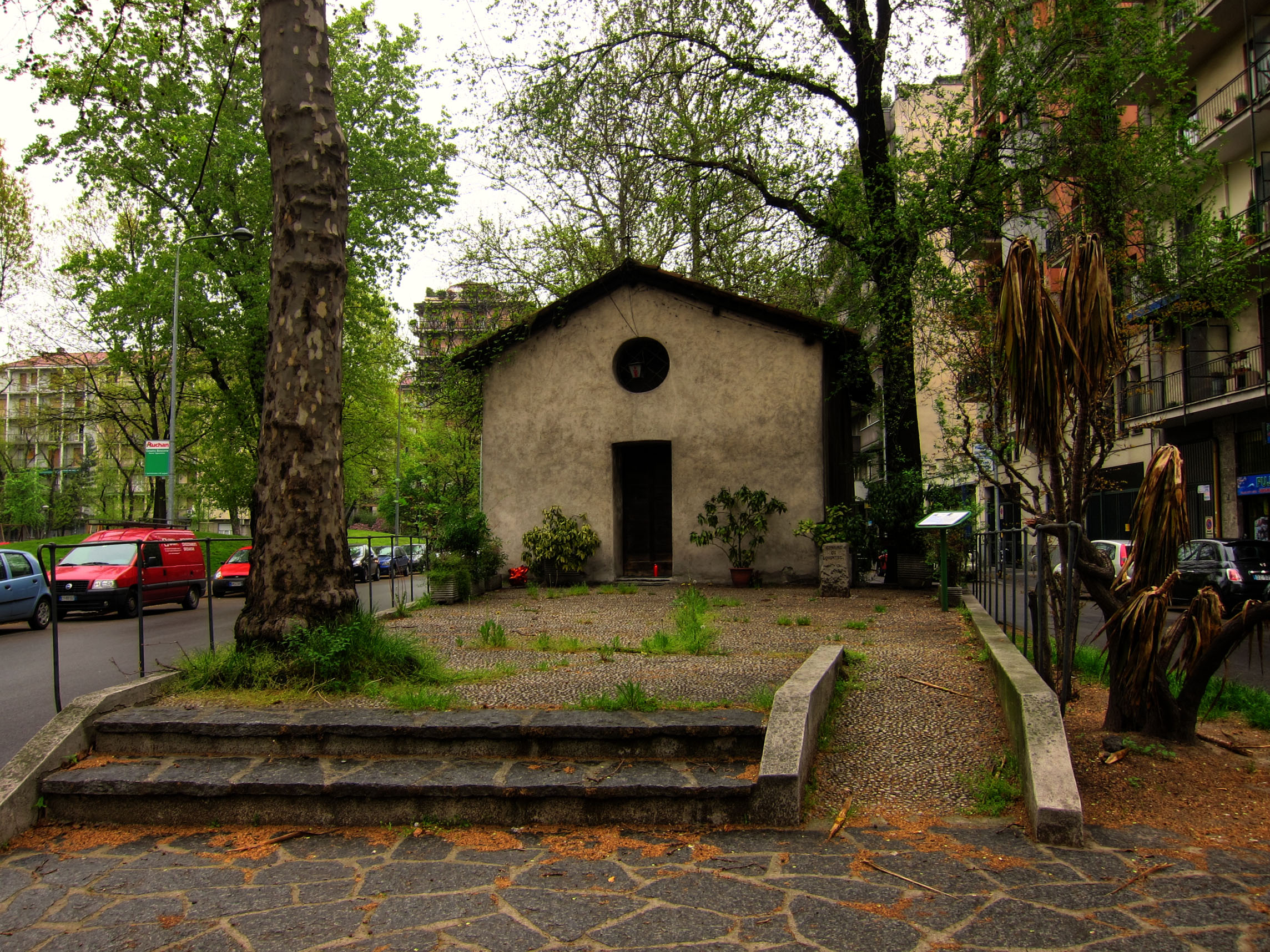
Oratorio di San Protaso al Lorenteggio

The Oratorio di San Protaso ("Oratory of Saint Protasius"; Lombard: Oratori de San Protas [uraˈtɔri de ˌsãː pruˈtaːs], colloquially known as Gesetta di Lusert [dʒeˈzɛta di lyˈzɛrt] "Little Church of the Lizards") is a church in via Lorenteggio, Milan, Lombardy.

== History ==
The Oratorio was built around the year 1000 AD, far outside the walls of Milan at the time, as a small place of worship for the peasants. It was a property of the Basilica di San Vittore al Corpo, which provided a priest for the Mass; Saint Protasius, whom the Oratorio is named for, was martyrized and buried in the San Vittore Basilica.

The building, not in line with via Lorenteggio, the road by which it was built, was probably in line with either another street which, starting from the Medieval walls of Milan, went westwards along the Olona river, or in line with the summer solstice as it was a custom in pagan times: this could mean that the Oratorio was built on the site of a former pagan place of worship.

According to a Milanese legend, during the siege of Milan of 1161-62 by the armies of Holy Roman Emperor Frederick I Barbarossa, the Milanese forces had put on a particularly strong resistance in the area of Lorenteggio; once his armies managed to drive the Milanese back, the Emperor stopped in this oratory and prayed, thanking God for the victory. Another legend tells that, during the Black Death in the 14th century, a hermit settled in the oratory to pray and his faith protected the whole village from the pandemic.

In the next centuries the Oratorio was then used for some years as a chapel by a group of female monks of the Order of the Angeliche of Saint Paul (founded in 1530 by countess Ludovica Torelli) who lived in a nearby farmhouse, probably a convent at the time. In the 17th century control of the church was taken over by the Olivetans.

The oratory then lost its use as a place of worship during the Napoleonic era, when it was used by the Emperor's troops as weapons' storage. It was also apparently used by Count Federico Confalonieri as a secret hideout where he met with other carbonari to prepare the revolutionary uprisings against the Austrians of 1820-21.

The Oratorio got back to being used as a place of worship about a century later, allegedly after a miraculous event, but it was abandoned when the construction of the neighboring church of San Vito al Giambellino was completed in 1937.

It was in the 50s that the Oratorio, still abandoned and home to many lizards only, got its colloquial name Gesetta di Lusert, "Little Church of the Lizards", which is still in common use among Lombard speakers in the area. The iconic building, at the time still surrounded by open fields, became an inspiration for many painters and also for Milanese songwriter Piero Mazzarella who wrote a song about it.

At the end of the 50s, the existence of the Oratorio was endangered as, during the urbanization boom of Milan, the municipality planned to tear it down along with the Cascina San Protaso farmhouse in order to widen via Lorenteggio, which had become in the meantime a major road in a heavily populated suburb. After many protests by local inhabitants, the church was spared from demolition, so that it now stands in the median strip of via Lorenteggio.

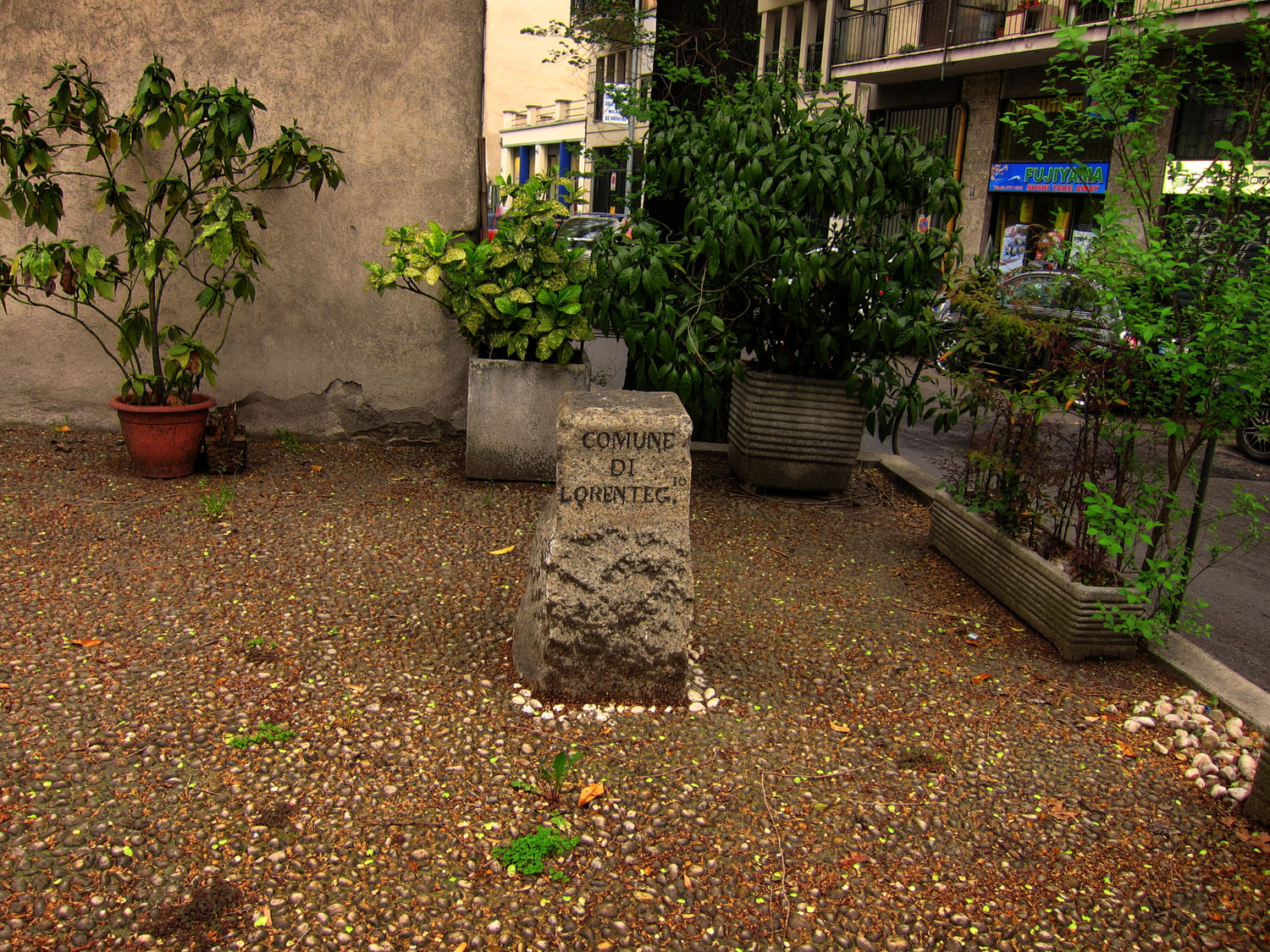
The 18th-century boundary stone placed in front of the Oratorio in 2008.

Still, the Oratorio was kept abandoned and in decay; only in the 80s a restoration was carried out, financed by the Lions Club of Milan, the Association of Traders of Lorenteggio, some banks, and local citizens. During the restoration works, a pebble parvis was built in front of the church; there, in 2008 has been placed a 19th-century boundary stone found by the nearby via Inganni, marking the boundary between the then-independent municipalities of Lorenteggio and Corpi Santi di Milano.

Today, it opens for the neighborhood festival Festa del Lorenteggio, the first Sunday of May and the last of November.

== Architecture ==
The architectural structure of the Oratorio is simple, in Lombard Romanesque style, with a rectangular plan, a hut-shaped façade, and a wooden coffered ceiling. The entrance is a small wooden door with architrave and a circular window above it; internal lighting is also provided by three ogival slots in the lateral walls: two in the right-side wall and one in the left-side one, between two frescos; they replaced the two original larger lateral windows.

The inside of the oratory is still simple, with interesting frescos dating to different times. In the lower part of the apse there are the remains of the most ancient one, dating to the 11th or 12th century, contemporaneous to the oratory's construction, representing scenes of hunting or from a bestiary.

On the left-side wall there is a fresco representing Saint Catherine of Siena; it is signed by the author, Fra' de Porta Vercellina, while the writing marking the purchaser, Michele de Zeni Grando, is nowadays almost impossible to read. There is a doubt about the correct dating being July 14, 1428 or 1498.

On the same wall there are a few remains of a late 15th century fresco, probably a work by the Zavattari family who at the time was tasked with painting frescos in the Ducal Chapel of the nearby church of San Cristoforo sul Naviglio. These remains represent a crucifixion scene with a deformed figure standing on the side (probably Saint John) and part of a church façade, possibly the back of an enthroned Virgin Mary.

Finally, in the upper part of the apse there is a Baroque fresco known as Madonna del Divino Aiuto (Italian for "Virgin Mary of Divine Help") surrounded by angels and saints: Saint Bernardo Tolomei (founder of the Olivetans order, canonized in 2009), Saint Frances of Rome (founder of the Order of Benedictine Oblates) and Saint Victor the Moor, martyrized in Milan and buried in San Vittore al Corpo.
