= Christ Episcopal Church (Williamsport, Pennsylvania) =

Coordinates: 41.243°N 77.000°W

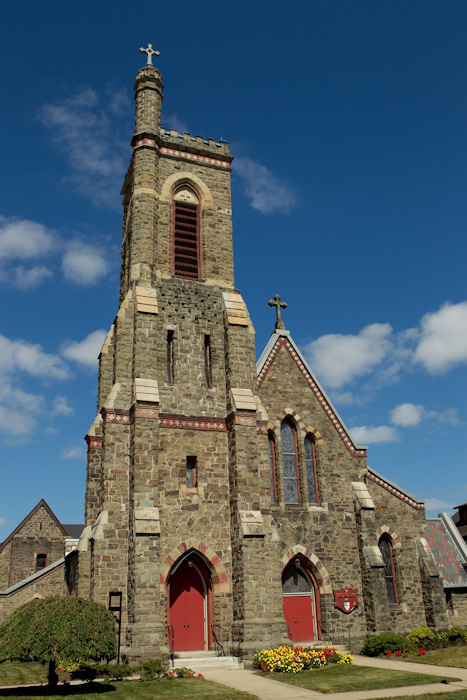
Christ Episcopal Church

Christ Episcopal Church is an historical church in Williamsport, Pennsylvania. The church reported 94 members in 2016 and 151 members in 2023; no membership statistics were reported in 2024 parochial reports. Plate and pledge income reported for the congregation in 2024 was $177,176 with average Sunday attendance (ASA) of 82 persons.

The church was founded in 1841 as the first Episcopal Church of Williamsport. The church building was consecrated in 1843. It has a distinctive characteristic as the high-church or Anglo-catholic Episcopal parish in the city. Its sanctuary is regarded as one of the most beautiful classical worship spaces in central Pennsylvania, being appointed with several genuine Tiffany stained-glass windows, encaustic tile, and much fine brass and artisanal woodwork. It is also noted historically for the tenure of its eleventh rector, the Rev. Dr. John Henry Hopkins, Jr., composer of the beloved Epiphany Hymn "We Three Kings of Orient Are."
