= Caspar (magus) =

One of three Magi who visited Jesus

Saint Caspar
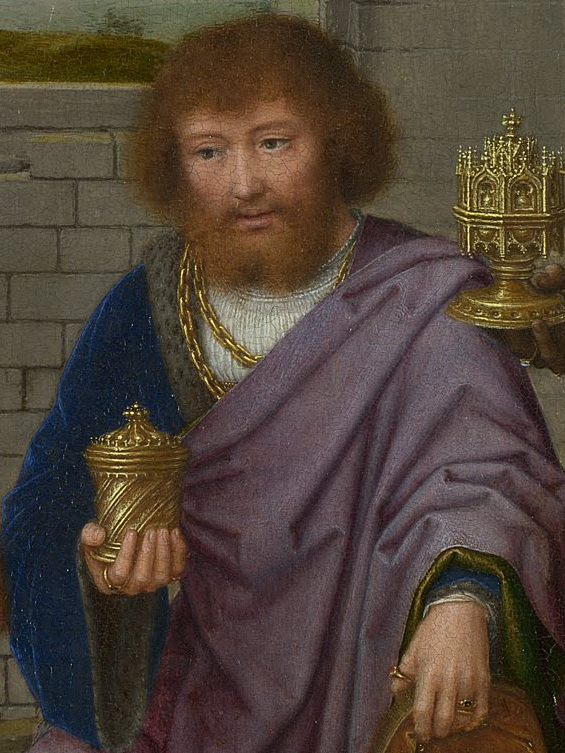
- Detail of Caspar in Adoration of the Kings by Gerard David, c. 1515

Three Magi, Three Kings, Three Wise Men
- Venerated in: Roman Catholic Church; Eastern Orthodox Church; Anglican Communion; Lutheran Church
- Canonized: Pre-Congregation
- Major shrine: Shrine of the Three Kings, Cologne Cathedral
- Feast: 6 January (Epiphany); 11 January (Date of his death)
- Attributes: King bearing gifts, king on a camel, three crowns
- Patronage: Epilepsy, thunder, motorists, pilgrims, playing card manufacturers, sawmen, sawyers, travellers, travelling merchants, Cologne, Germany, Saxony

Caspar (otherwise known as Casper, Gaspar, Kaspar, Jasper, and other variations) was one of the 'Three Kings', along with Melchior and Balthazar, representing the wise men or Biblical Magi mentioned in Matthew 2:1-9. Although the Bible's Gospel books do not specify who or what the Magi were, they have been identified in the Catholic Churches as Caspar, Melchior and Balthasar ever since the seventh century. Caspar and the other two Magi are venerated as saints in the Roman Catholic Church, the Orthodox Catholic Church, the Anglican Church and the Lutheran Church.

== Name origin ==
While it is generally accepted that Caspar was one of the Biblical Magi or 'three wise men' who were said to have visited the infant Jesus – bearing gifts of gold, frankincense and myrrh – there is some debate in academic literature over the rendering of his name. It is probable that these various renderings are due to regional and linguistic differences among scholars in different times, places and tongues.

Jasper is traditionally identified as having brought the frankincense, hence the Persian etymology of Jasper as a given name, meaning 'bringer of gifts' or 'treasurer'.

The name Caspar or Casper is derived from "Gaspar". In turn, "Gaspar" is from an ancient Chaldean word, "Gizbar", which, according to Strong's Concordance, means "treasurer". The form "Gizbar" appears in the Hebrew version of the Old Testament Book of Ezra (1:8). In fact, the modern Hebrew word for "treasurer" is still "Gizbar". By the 1st century B.C., the Septuagint gave a Greek translation of "Gizbar" in Ezra 1:8 as "γασβαρηνου" ("Gasbarinou", literally son of "Gasbar"). The transition from "Gizbar" to "Caspar" and "Kaspar" can therefore be summarised as: Gizbar > Gasbar > Gaspar > Caspar > Kaspar ("C" being a misreading of the manuscript "G", and "K" having the same phonetic value as "C". Another derivation proposed by Gutschmid (1864) might be the corruption of the Iranic name "Gondophares".

== Place of origin ==
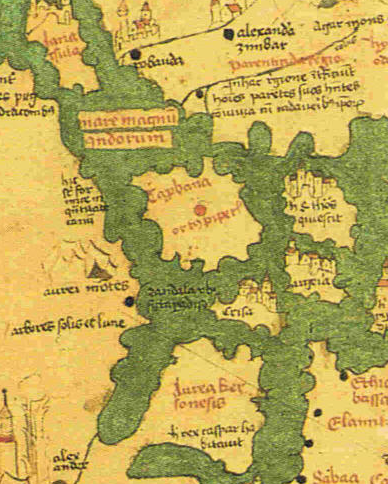
The homeland of King Caspar in the Aurea Cersonese, the Golden Peninsula, near Java in the Indian Ocean, on the map by Andreas Walsperger, c. 1448

Who the Magi were is not specified in the Bible; there are only traditions. Since English translations of the Bible refer to them as "men who studied the stars", they are believed to have been astrologers, who could foresee the birth of a "Messiah" from their study of the stars.

Caspar is often considered to be an Indian scholar. An article in the 1913 Encyclopædia Britannica states that "according to Western church tradition, Balthasar is often represented as a king of Arabia, Melchior as a king of Persia, and Caspar as a king of India." The historian John of Hildesheim relates a tradition in the ancient silk road city of ancient Taxila that one of the Magi passed through the city on the way to Bethlehem.

Some consider Caspar to be King Gondophares (AD 21 – c. AD 47) mentioned in the Acts of Thomas. Others consider him to have come from the southern parts of India where, according to tradition, Thomas the Apostle visited decades later. The town of Piravom in Kerala State, Southern India has long claimed that one of the three Biblical Magi set out from there. The name Piravom in the local Malayalam language translates to "birth". It is believed that the name originated from a reference to the Nativity of Jesus. There are no fewer than three churches named after the Biblical Magi in and around Piravom, compared to a total of only three eponymous churches in the rest of India.

Some people consider that Caspar's kingdom was located in the region of Egrisilla in India Superior on the peninsula that forms the eastern side of the Sinus Magnus (Gulf of Thailand) by Johannes Schöner on his 1515 globe. Egrisilla Bragmanni ("Egrisilla of the Brahmans") can be seen on this globe, as well as in the accompanying explanatory treatise. Schöner noted: "The region of Egrisilla, in which there are Brahman [i.e. Indian] Christians; there Gaspar the Magus held dominion". The phrase hic rex caspar habitavit (here lived King Caspar) is inscribed over the Golden Chersonese (Malay Peninsula) on the mappemonde by Andreas Walsperger made in Constance round about 1448. Nor do we know whether he was a latter-day king who took the name of Caspar.

Johannes Schöner on Gaspar magus, or Saint Caspar: "The region of Egrisilla, in which there are Brahman [i.e. Indian] Christians; there Gaspar the Magus held dominion," Luculentissima quaedam terrae totius descriptio.

Some people nowadays are of the opinion that the Magi were not actually kings. The reference to "kings" is believed to have originated due to the reference in Psalms "The kings of Tharsis and the islands shall offer presents; the kings of the Arabians and of Saba shall bring him gifts: and all the kings of the earth shall adore him" Psalm 72:10.

Some late medieval depictions of Caspar as an African king may have been influenced by accounts of the hajj pilgrimage of the Malian ruler Mansa Musa.

== Gift to the Infant Jesus ==
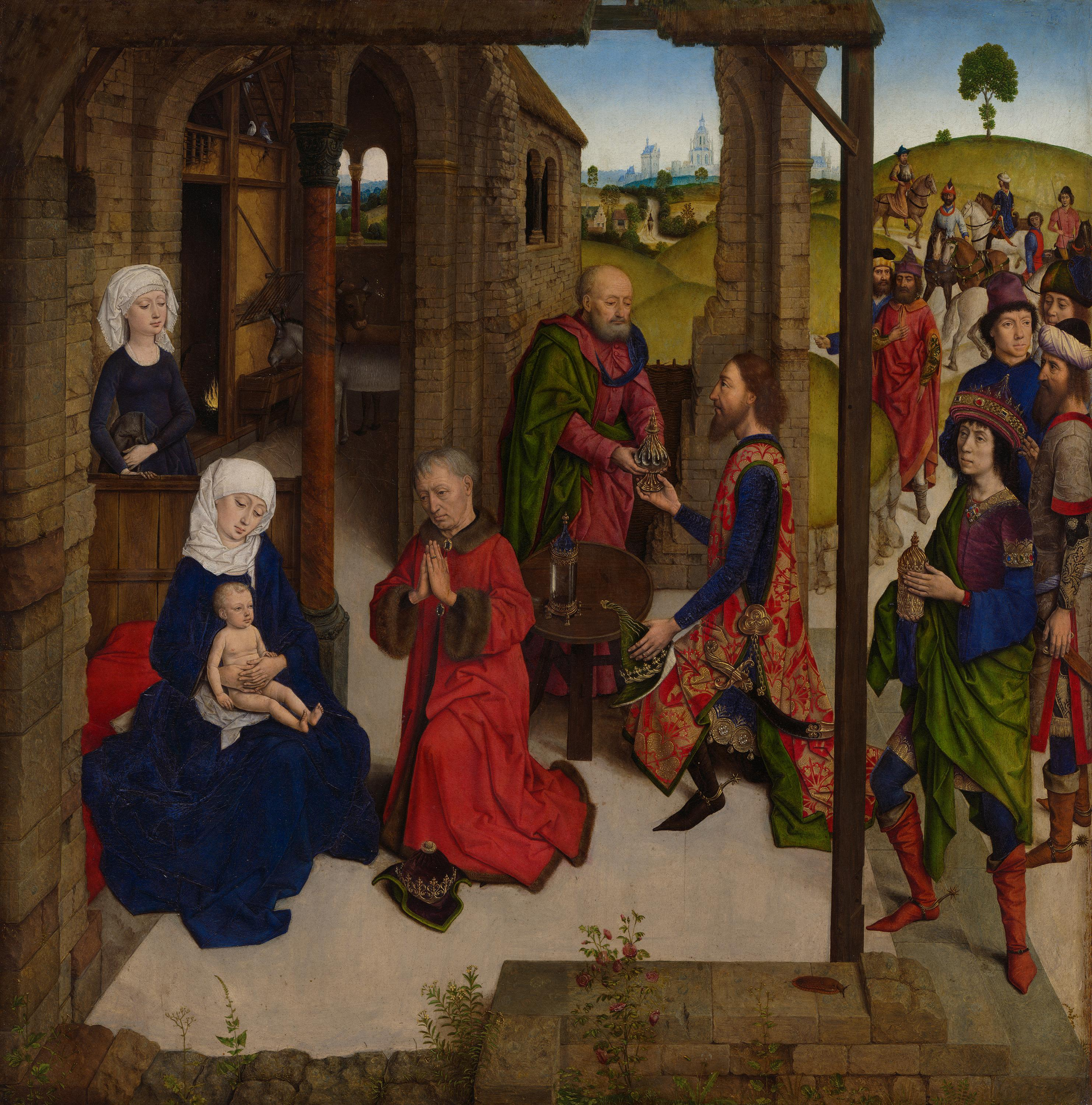
Caspar is behind the kneeling Melchior in The Magi visiting the Infant Jesus, by Dieric Bouts.

In the Book of Matthew it is stated that the Magi brought three gifts – gold, frankincense and myrrh. These gifts apparently have deeper significance, the gold signifying the regal status of Jesus, the frankincense his divinity, and the myrrh his human nature. Caspar is traditionally portrayed with a reddish beard in the middle of the three kings, as younger than Melchior and older than Balthasar; he is waiting behind Melchior to give the gift of frankincense to the Infant Jesus. He is often portrayed in the act of accepting his gift from an assistant, or in the act of removing his crown: signs of preparing to be next at the feet of the Infant Jesus.

== Death ==
According to tradition, Caspar became a martyr; some people are of the opinion that the other two Magi also met with the same fate. The relics of the Magi were found in Persia by Helena, but were later brought to Constantinople and then to Milan in Italy. From there, they were taken to Germany, where they are now housed in Cologne Cathedral.

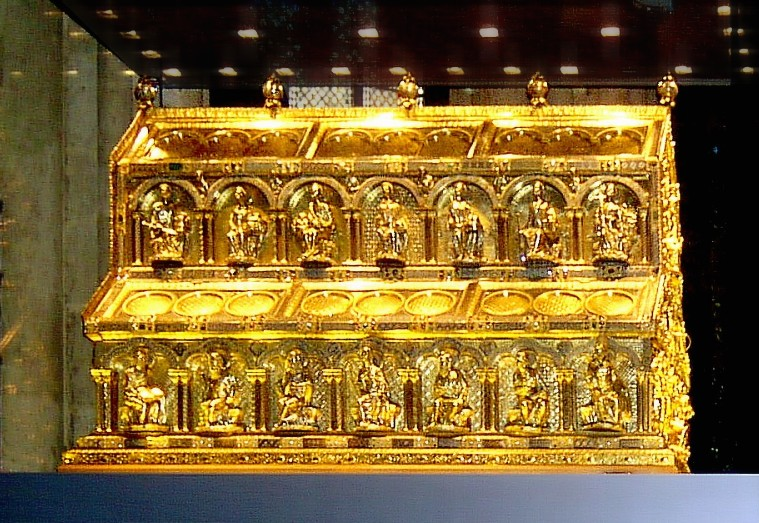
The relics of the Magi kept in the Shrine of the Three Kings in Cologne Cathedral, Germany

Caspar is commemorated on the Feast of Epiphany along with the other members of the Magi; he is also commemorated in the Roman Catholic Church on his own feast day, 11 January. Following his return to his own country, avoiding King Herod, it is purported that Caspar celebrated Christmas with the other members of the Magi in Armenia in 54 AD. Caspar died on January 11, 55 AD, aged 109.

== Veneration ==
In some parishes, it is traditional to bless chalk for each family so that they may mark the first initial of each of the three Magi over their doors as a blessing for protection.

== Commemoration ==
The red epiphytic alga Chlidophyllon kaspar (originally named Porphyra kaspar) from Manawatāwhi Three Kings Islands is named after Caspar.

== See also ==
- Casper
