= Shrine of the Three Kings =

Reliquary of the Biblical Magi

Coordinates: 50°56′29″N 6°57′32″E

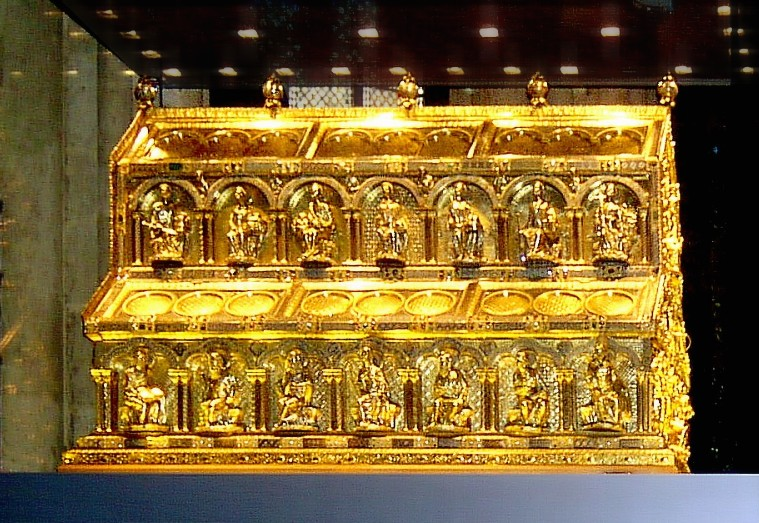
The Shrine of the Three Kings in Cologne Cathedral

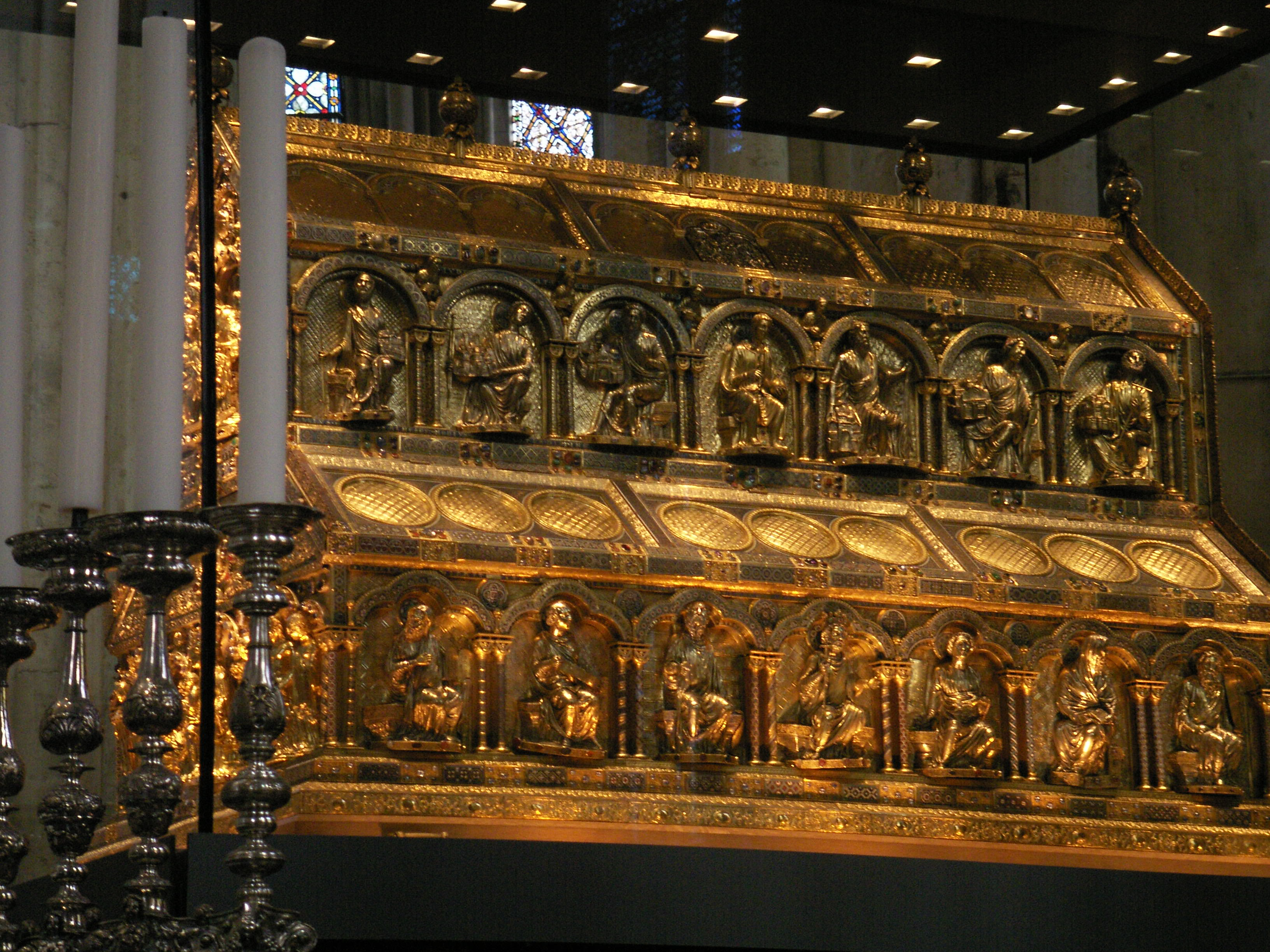
Another view

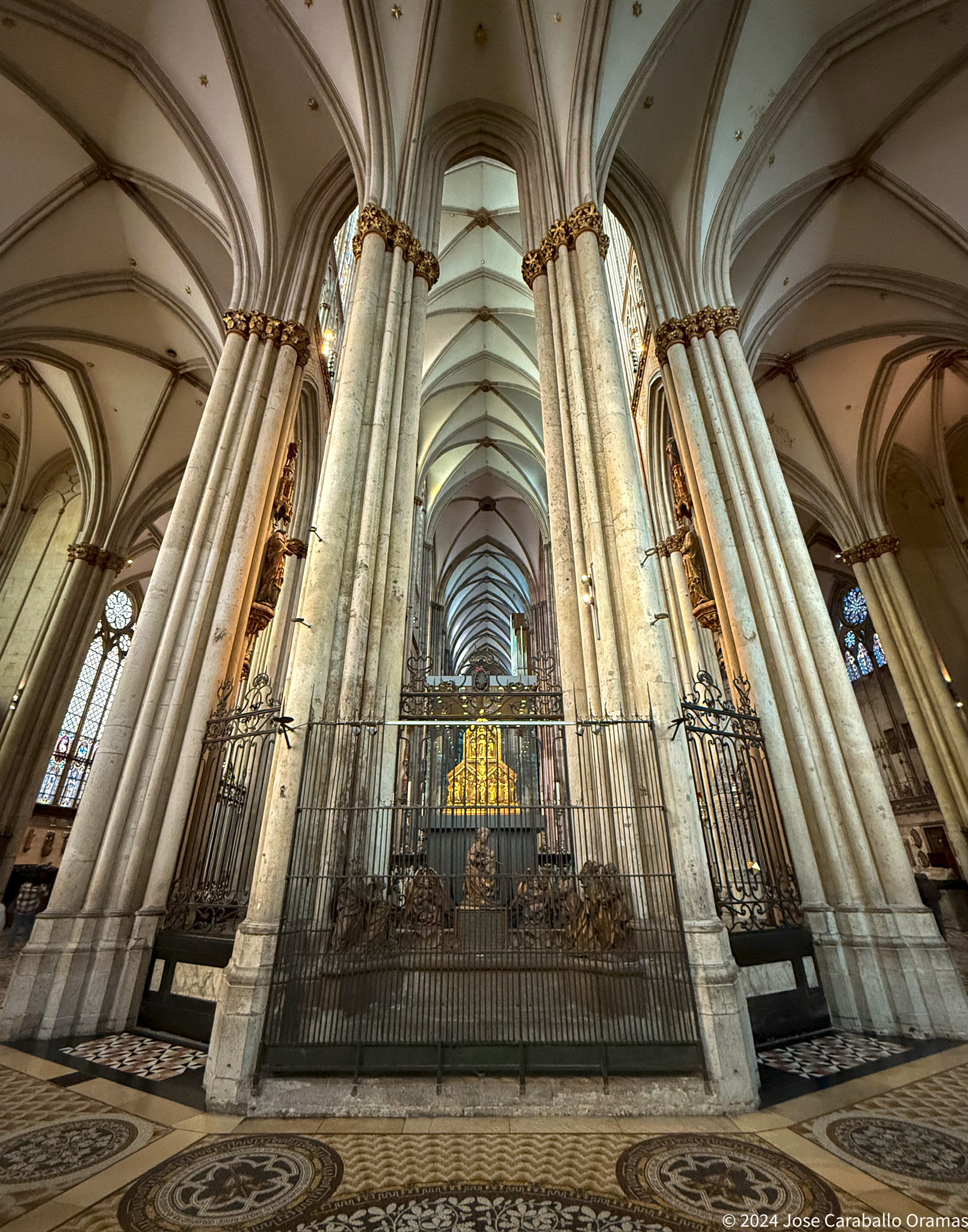
Shrine of the Three Kings, Köln

The Shrine of the Three Kings (German: Dreikönigsschrein or Der Dreikönigenschrein), Tomb of the Three Kings, or Tomb of the Three Magi is a reliquary traditionally believed to contain the bones of the Biblical Magi, also known as the Three Kings or the Three Wise Men. This shrine is a large gilded and decorated triple sarcophagus situated above and behind the high altar of Cologne Cathedral in western Germany. Constructed approximately between 1180 and 1225, it ranks amongst the largest reliquaries in the Western world; various historians and scholars regard it as the high point of Mosan art.

The shrine experienced periods of damage and restoration during the 16th century. Although the shrine has always been on display, it was not until the 19th century that the relics were unveiled to the public. The relics of the three kings were first exhibited on public display in the 12th century.

Adorned with intricate decorations, the shrine's surfaces narrate the stories of the three Magi, of the Virgin Mary, and of the life of Christ. These narratives are depicted with figures meticulously rendered in gold-plated silver.

== History ==
=== Origin ===
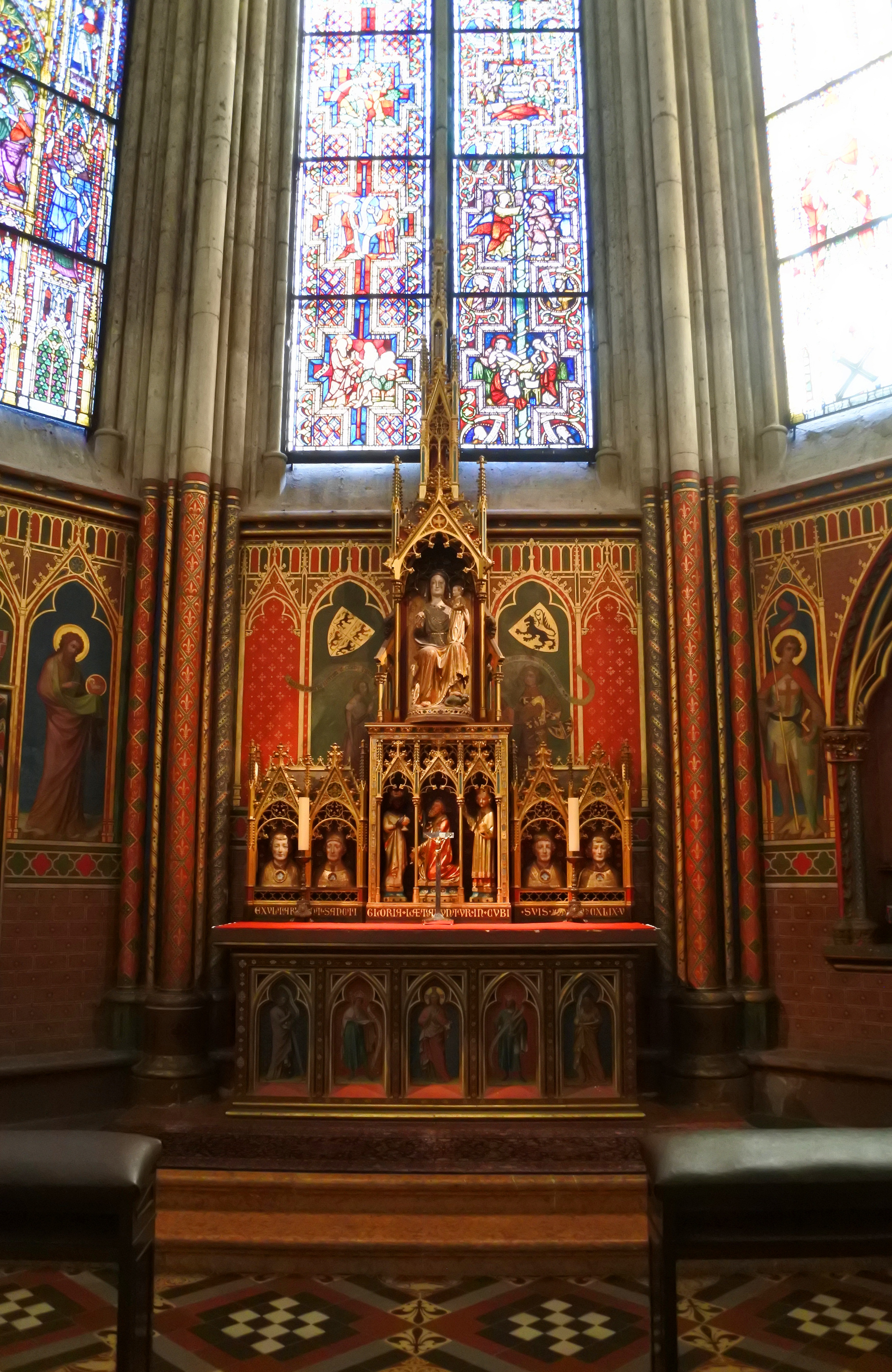
Chapel of the Magi, Cologne Cathedral, where the Shrine of the Three Kings was kept from 1322 until 1948

The "relics of the Magi" were originally brought to Constantinople by Empress Helena, Constantine the Great's mother, then taken to Milan in an oxcart by Eustorgius I, the city's bishop, to whom they were entrusted by Constantine in 314. Eight centuries later in 1164, Holy Roman Emperor Frederick Barbarossa took the relics of the Magi from the church of Saint Eustorgio in Milan and gave them to the Archbishop of Cologne, Rainald of Dassel, who was also the imperial Archchancellor of Italy. In 1164, Rainald transferred these relics to Cologne where the shrine for the three kings was built. Their bones were wrapped in white silk and returned to the shrine. The relics have since attracted a constant stream of pilgrims to Cologne.

Parts of the shrine were designed by the famous medieval goldsmith Nicholas of Verdun, who began to work on it in 1180. It was completed circa 1225. Other parts of the shrine were decorated during the time of Archbishop Philip von Hensberg with additional jewels and gold placed on it. Scholar Lisa Victoria Ciresi notes that these precious jewels are said to evoke images of the Heavenly Jerusalem.

Around 1199, King Otto IV gave three golden crowns, purported to be made for the three wise men, as a present to the cathedral of Cologne. Because of the importance of the shrine and the cathedral for the later development of the city, the coat of arms of Cologne still shows these three crowns symbolizing the Three Kings. Hugo Stehkämper theorizes that King Otto IV of Brunswick was often depicted as the fourth king. He ascended to the throne in 1198 and became Holy Roman Emperor in 1209. He donated all of the materials that were needed to complete the shrine. On the shrine, he is depicted in the procession behind the Magi with inscription that labels him: "Otto Rex." Although King Otto IV offered the three kings the gold crowns, he, himself, does not wear one with them in his depiction on the shrine. Jürgen Petersohn writes that King Otto IV wanted to be seen as having equal rank with the Three Magis, thus, he joins in on the Adoration of Christ.

Construction of the present Cologne Cathedral begun in 1248 to house these important relics. The cathedral took 632 years to complete and is now the largest Gothic church in northern Europe.

=== Disturbances and preservations ===
The shrine has undergone numerous disturbances and recoveries; however, aside from what was already lost, the shrine remains lavishly preserved. The last restoration of the shrine took place between 1961 and 1973 after it was removed during World War II from the cathedral.

The shrine has been carefully preserved by an officiate or custodes regum that made it possible for the relics to remain in good condition for five hundred years. However, Renaissance collectors highly valued the gems on the shrine, making the shrine a target for robbery. On 28 January 1574, several gems and pearls along with a large cameo were stolen from the trapezoid plate of the shrine.

==== Ptolemy cameo ====
On 28 January 1574, the highly decorative parts of the shrine were stolen, including the Ptolemy cameo, from the trapezoid plate. The thief looted the shrine at a time when the priest celebrated mass and his back faced the laity. Unfortunately, the gems and jewels have never been recovered, nor has the identity of the thief been found.

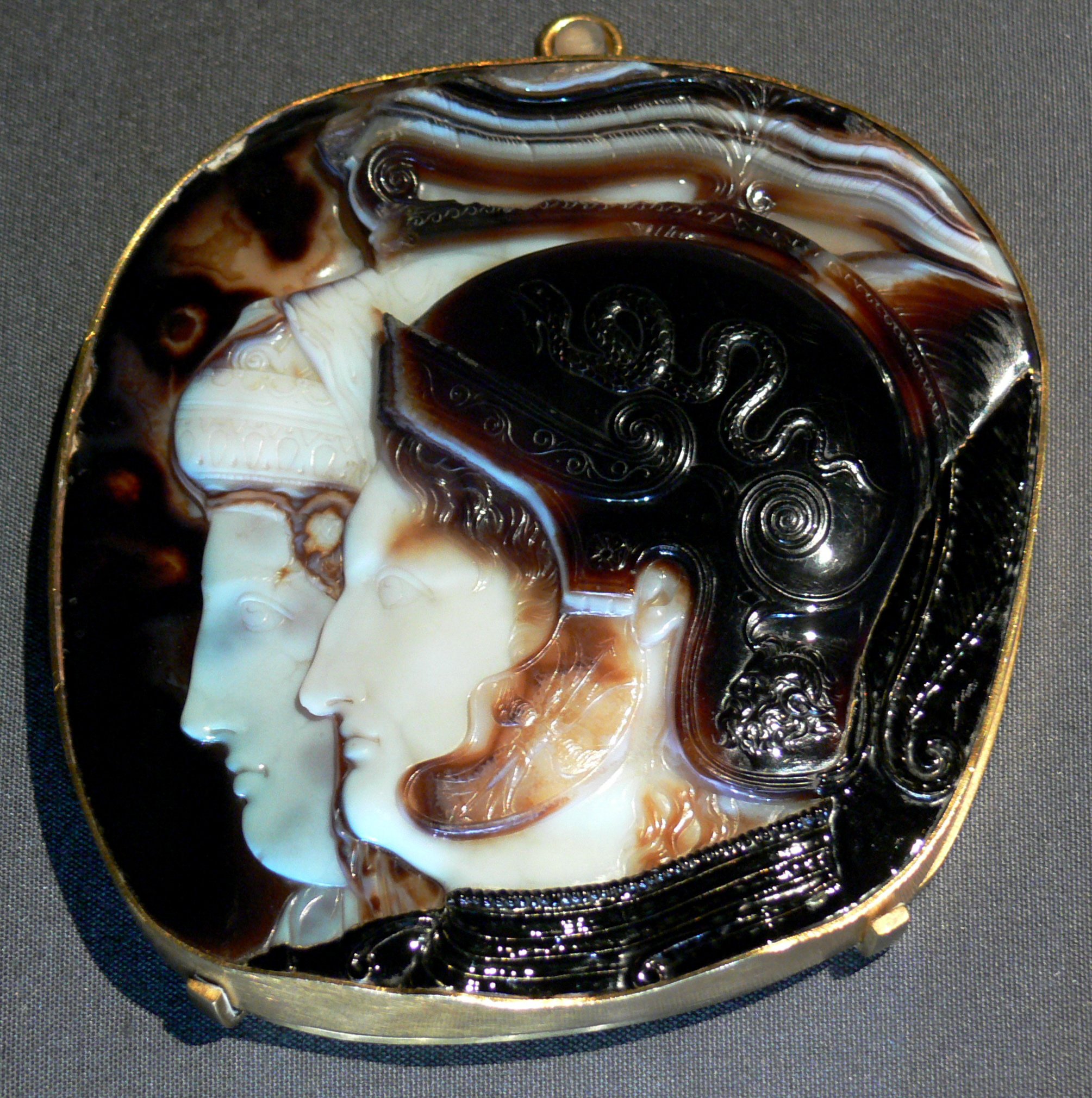
Ptolemy Cameo

The stolen cameo, an Indian sardonyx with seventeen layers, eleven of which were used for engraving, was said to have two heads on it, and the measurement was about the size of a hand. The two heads represent the portrait of Ptolemy II and his wife, Arsinoë II. It was created during the Hellenistic period, 3rd century, in Egypt.

Albertus Magnus described the appearance of the stolen cameo in a note. In October 1586, the cameo was later offered in Rome to Fulvio Orsini, a Flemish dealer. It was discovered to have been fractured during the times of the robbery, but it was repaired with an armored piece called a gorget, which was made of steel or leather, and a golden frame. From 1586 onward, it has not been returned to the shrine, rather, it resides in the imperial collection at Vienna, which was confirmed by Clifford Brown.

=== Nineteenth-century history ===
On 20 July 1864, the shrine was opened, revealing human remains and the coins of Philip I, Archbishop of Cologne. An eyewitness report reads:

"In a special compartment of the shrine now there showed – along with remains of ancient old rotten or moulded bandages, most likely byssus, besides pieces of aromatic resins and similar substances – numerous bones of three persons, which under the guidance of several present experts could be assembled into nearly complete bodies: the one in his early youth, the second in his early manhood, the third was rather aged. Two coins, bracteates made of silver and only one side stricken, were adjoined; one, probably from the days of Philipps von Heinsberg, displayed a church (See Note), the other showed a cross, accompanied by the sword of jurisdiction, and the crosier (bishop's crook) on either side."

Note: "Just as the coin of Philipp in Hartzheim, historia rei nummariae coloniensis Table 3 No. 14, 16, (1754), yet without its circumscription; the other (coin) is in square form, showed in the center a cross, accompanied by the sword of jurisdiction, and the crosier (bishop's crook) on either side, also without transcription, most certainly it is not younger and can be assumed perhaps to turn out to be a coin by Rainald [of Dassel]."

== Identity of the Three Magi ==
Images of the three Kings are located in the bottom middle of the sanctuary, offering gifts in this order according to the Gospel of Matthew: gold, frankincense, and myrrh, to Mary on the throne holding infant Jesus. These ventured from the east to Bethlehem where Christ was born after seeing a star. The identities of these Magi are in the order they appear on the shrine as golden figures: Caspar, Melchior, Balthasar. Melchior, shown on the shrine with a long beard, is the oldest of the three. He is King of Persia, and was given the gift of gold to give the Christ Child. Balthasar, depicted as an old Middle Eastern or Black man with African features on the shrine, was the King of Arabia or sometimes Ethiopia; he is giving the gift of myrrh to the Christ Child. Lastly, Caspar (or Gaspar) was the youngest of the three, and shown with a short beard on the shrine; he was given the gift of frankincense to give the Christ child.

== Description ==
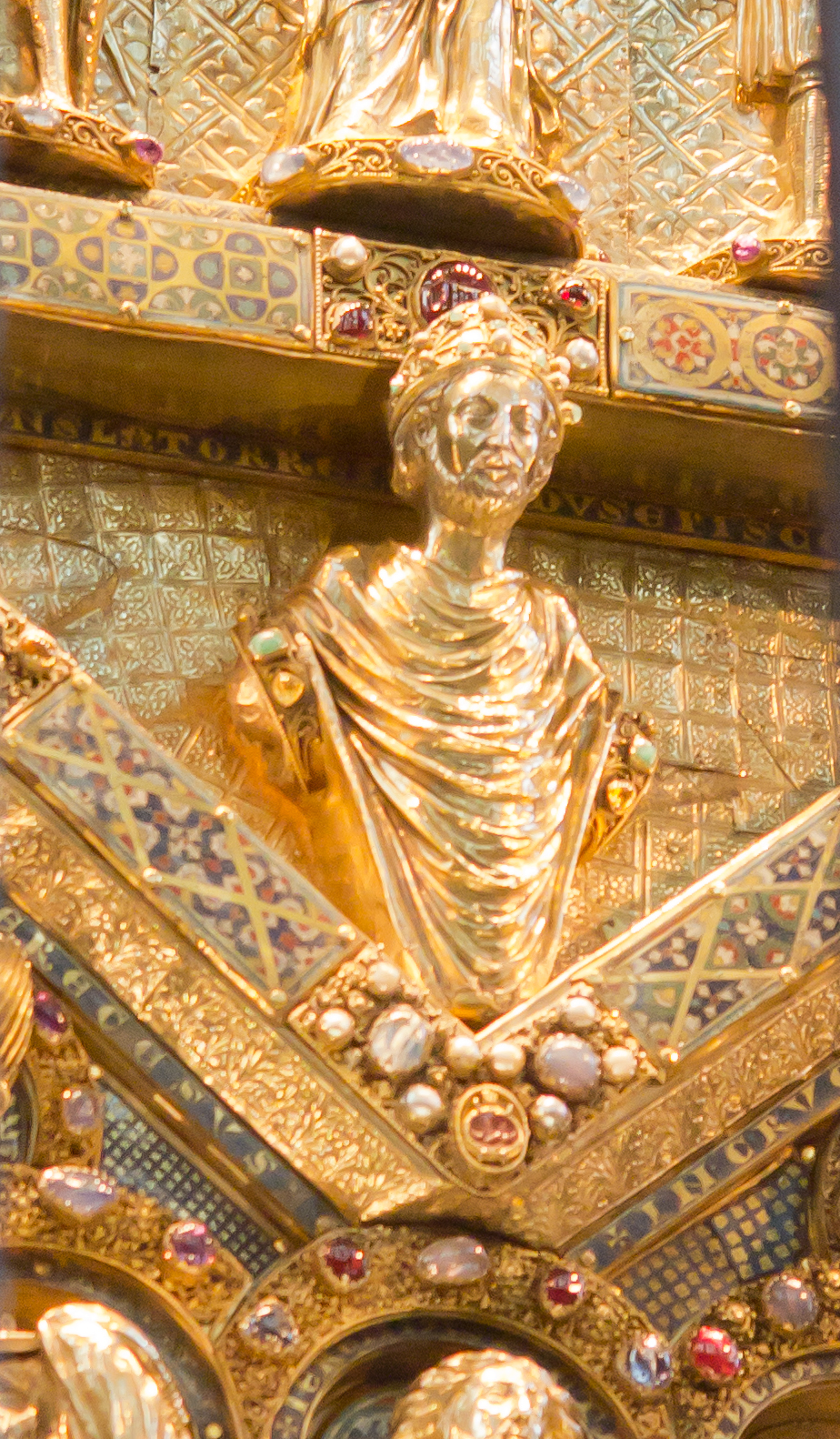
Detail with bust of Rainald von Dassel

=== Size and construction ===
The Shrine of the Three Kings is approximately 110 cm (43 in) wide, 153 cm (60 in) high, and 220 cm (87 in) long. It is shaped like a basilica: two sarcophagi stand next to each other, with the third sarcophagus resting on their roof ridges. The ends are completely covered, so there is no space visible between the sarcophagi. The basic structure is made of wood, with gold and silver overlay decorated with filigree, enamel, and over 1,000 jewels and beads. The latter include a large number of cameos and intaglio pieces, some pre-Christian.

=== Decoration ===
The entire outside of the shrine is covered with an elaborate decorative overlay. There are 74 high relief figures in silver-gilt in all, not counting smaller additional figures in the background decoration. On the sides, images of the prophets decorate the lower part, while images of the apostles and evangelists decorate the upper part. It contains 304 engraved gems, where 142 of these gems have belonged to its initial embellishments. It is encircled by offertory candles and by twenty-four lamps. A grand chandelier hangs above the shrine that symbolizes the Heavenly Jerusalem.

A removable trapezoid allows the viewer to see the relics through a latticed opening. Supported by angels and dominating the center until 1574 was the large Ptolemy cameo. The function of these angels were to have been the holy messengers of God the Father when they were seen beside Christ holding a chalice, paten, and diadem.

==== Front ====
The front of the shrine, completed sometime after 1200, resembles that of a cathedral with a high central midpoint. The figures located here are made of pure gold. This area contains the most precious gems, though they had been stolen in the 16th century. Across the bottom, from left to right, are images of the Adoration of the Magi, the Virgin Mary enthroned with the infant Jesus, and the Baptism of Christ, and above, Christ enthroned at the Last Judgment. A removable filigree panel reveals a grille displaying the names of Caspar, Melchior, and Balthasar. When the grille is removed, the skulls of the three Magi are shown wearing crowns.

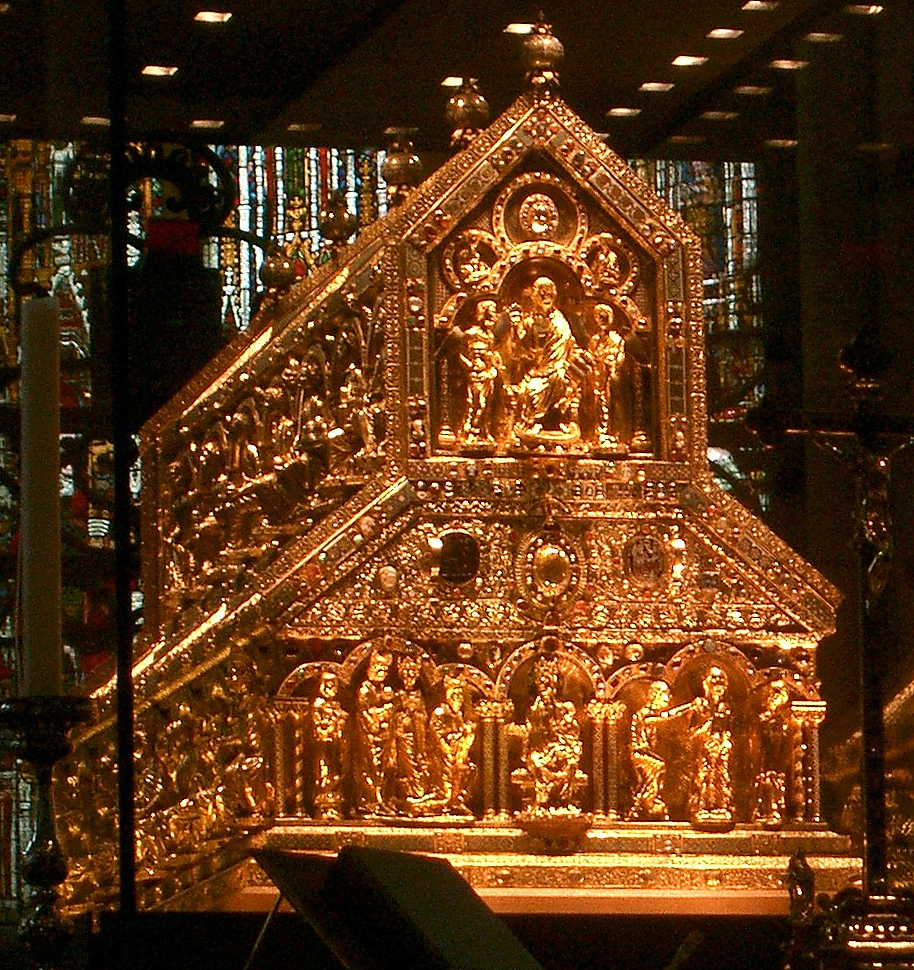
Front of the Shrine with the trapezoid plate

The present front has been remodeled since the original design made by Nicolas of Verdun. However, the original plan for it is unknown. The Ptolemy cameo, the angels, and the row of crowns in the spandrels have been cleared away; however, the figure of Otto IV remains unchanged except for his little gold box that he is holding.

==== Back ====
The back is similar in appearance to the two reliquaries on top. The relics of the three Kings are arranged in the bottom part of the shrine whereas martyrs Felix and Nabor are located in the smaller upper part. There are 74 high relief figures in silver-gilt in all, not counting smaller additional figures in the background decoration. The surface is divided into 3 zones: lower, middle and upper zones. The standing figure of Jeremiah separates the events of Flagellation and Crucifixion in the lower zone. Above the lower zone, the middle zone, contains the portrait bust of Rainald of Dassel, the Archbishop of Cologne. In the upper zone, the resurrected Christ is seen crowning the martyrs Felix and Nabor. Christ in Majesty is shown holding the Book of Life in his left hand whilst his right hand is held high for an act of judgment. The inscription reads along the inner band of the gable:

"ADVENIO DIGNOS SALVARE FERIRE MALIGNOS ERGO BONI METITE FELICIA GAVDIA VITE ITE REI VOS IRA DEI TRANSMITTIT IN IGNem QUISQue METIT QUOD ProMERVIT SUB IUDICE IVSTO."

==== Sides ====
On the lateral sides, there are two series of aches that join the upper and lower levels. The figures of the prophets decorate the lower part, while the apostles and evangelists decorate the upper part, are all identified by their inscriptions and made of gilded silver. A cherub whose name is Plentinudo Scientiae (Abundant Wisdom) is seated in the middle of the apostles, while a seraph named Ardens Caritate (Ardent Sacred Love) sits on the other side.

=== Mosan art ===
Mosan art (Latin name Mosa meaning "Meuse") is a regional style drawing from Carolingian art, mostly produced in the Meuse river valley, during the 12th and 13th centuries. The Meuse valley is in present-day Belgium, Netherlands, and Germany. The elaborate metalwork on the shrine was made by Nicholas of Verdun, from Verdun, now in France, a small city on the banks of the Meuse River. The enamel panels depict Biblical narratives and iconographies of the life of Christ, the Virgin Mary, various saints and the Biblical Magi. Sculptural elements are seen on the shrine's figures. Mosan artists used techniques such as champlevé enamel, filigree, and cloisonné in their works.
