= Melchior (magus) =

One of the Biblical Magi

Saint Melchior
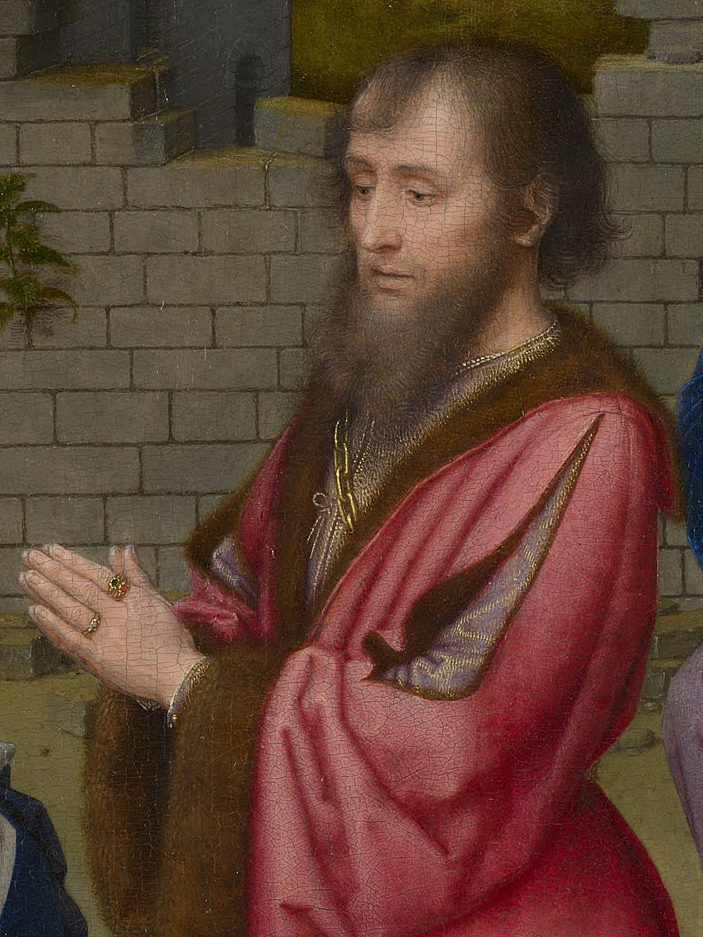
- Detail of Melchior in Adoration of the Kings by Gerard David, c. 1515

Three Magi, Three Kings, Three Wise Men
- Venerated in: Roman Catholic Church; Eastern Orthodox Church; Anglican Communion; Lutheran Church
- Canonized: Pre-Congregation
- Major shrine: Shrine of the Three Kings, Cologne Cathedral
- Feast: 1 January (Date of his Death); 6 January (Epiphany)
- Attributes: King bearing gifts, king on a camel, three crowns
- Patronage: Epilepsy, thunder, motorists, pilgrims, playing card manufacturers, sawmen, sawyers, travellers, travelling merchants, Cologne, Germany, Saxony

Melchior, or Melichior, was purportedly one of the Biblical Magi (along with Caspar and Balthazar) who visited the infant Jesus after he was born. Melchior was often referred to as the oldest member of the Magi. He was traditionally called the King of Persia and brought the gift of gold to Jesus. In the Western Christian church, he is regarded as a saint (as are the other two Magi).

== Tradition ==
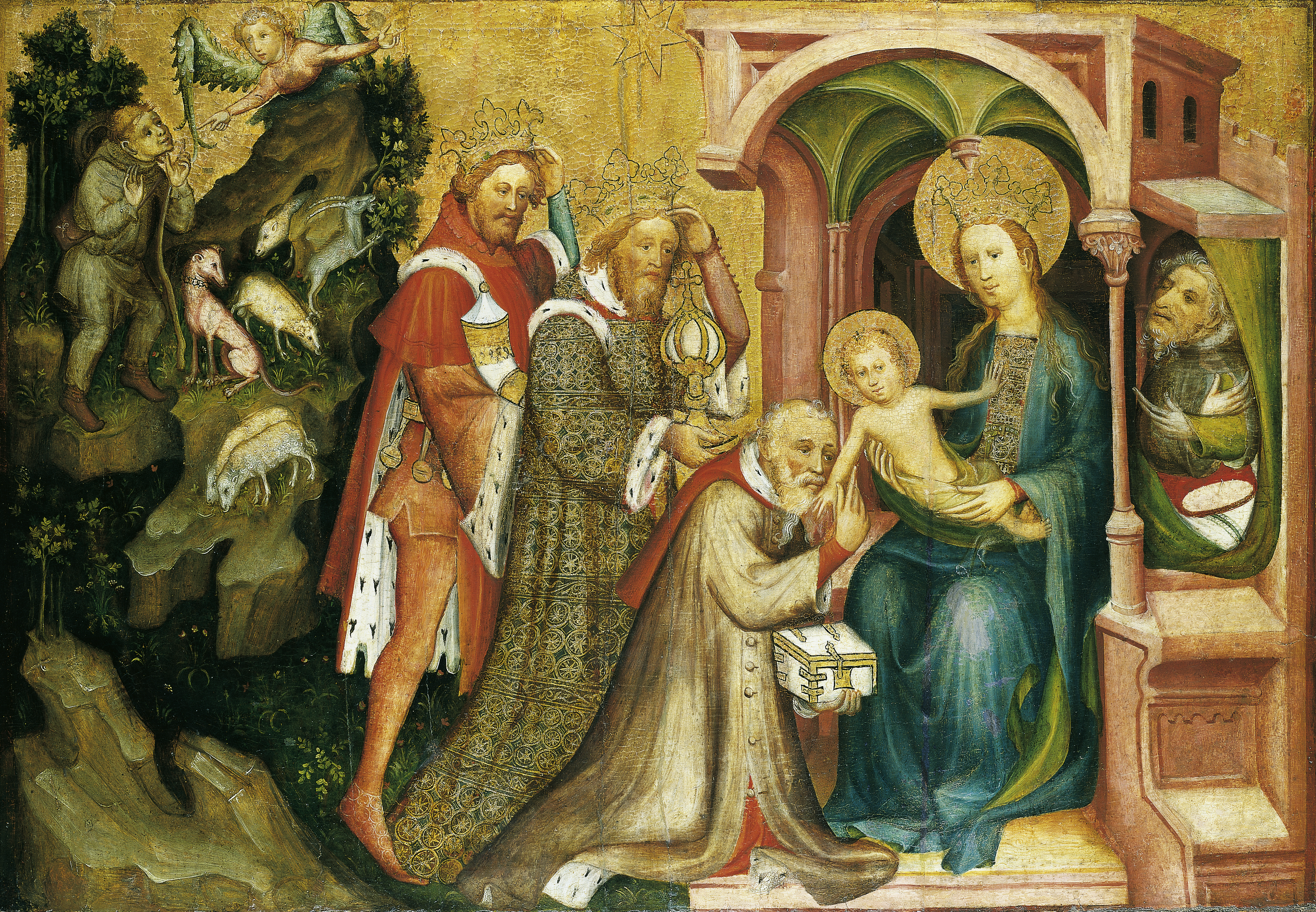
The Adoration of the Magi by the 'Master of the Middle Rhine', c. 1400 AD

The Gospels in the New Testament do not give the names of the Magi, or even their number; however, their traditional names are ascribed to a Greek manuscript from 500 AD translated into Latin and commonly accepted as the source of the names. Melchior was described by Bede in the 8th century as being "an old man, with white hair and long beard." Melchior is also commonly referred to as the King of Persia. Following the Star of Bethlehem, the Magi first travelled to the palace of Herod the Great, who then asked for the Magi to find the Child Jesus and report back to him. Upon arriving at the house, the Magi worshipped him and opened their gifts, with Melchior giving the gift of gold to signify Jesus' kingship over the world. According to a medieval saints calendar, following his return to Persia, Melchior met up with the other Magi again in 54 AD in the Kingdom of Armenia to celebrate Christmas before dying aged 116 on 1 January 55 AD.

== Commemoration ==
Melchior, along with the other Magi, is purported to be buried in the Shrine of the Three Kings in Cologne Cathedral following his remains being moved from Constantinople by Eustorgius I in 314 AD to Milan. In 1164, Holy Roman Emperor Fredrick Barbarossa moved them to Cologne. Melchior is commemorated on the Feast of Epiphany along with the other members of the Magi but is also commemorated in Catholicism with his feast day, 6 January.

The red alga Adamsiella melchiori from Manawatāwhi Three Kings Islands is named after Melchior.
