= Balthazar (magus) =

King of Arabia and youngest of three Magi who visited Jesus

Saint Balthazar
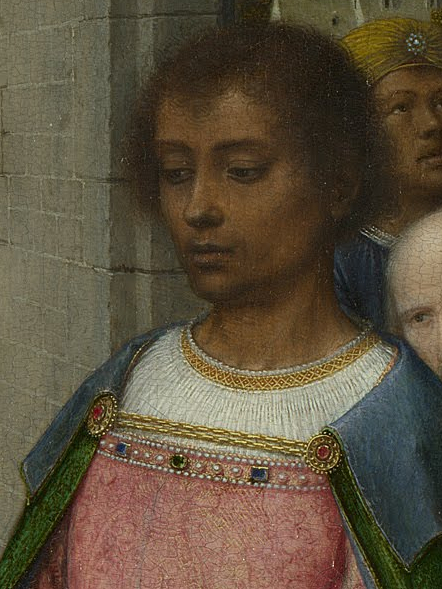
- Detail of Balthazar in Adoration of the Kings by Gerard David, c. 1515

Three Magi, Three Kings, Three Wise Men
- Venerated in: Catholic Church; Eastern Orthodox Church; Lutheranism
- Canonized: Pre-Congregation
- Major shrine: Shrine of the Three Kings, Cologne Cathedral
- Feast: 6 January (Epiphany); 6 January (date of his death)
- Attributes: King bearing gifts, king on a camel, three crowns, dark skin
- Patronage: Epilepsy, thunder, motorists, pilgrims, playing card manufacturers, sawmen, sawyers, travellers, travelling merchants, Cologne, Germany, Saxony

Balthazar, also called Balthasar, Balthassar, and Bithisarea, was, according to Western Christian tradition, one of the three biblical Magi (also known as wise men or kings) along with Caspar and Melchior who visited the infant Jesus after he was born. Balthazar is traditionally referred to as the King of Arabia and gave the gift of myrrh to Jesus. In the Catholic Church, he is regarded as a saint (as are the other two Magi).

== Tradition ==
The Gospel of Matthew does not give the names of the Magi (or even how many there were), but their traditional names are ascribed to a Greek manuscript from 500 AD translated into Latin and commonly accepted as the source of the names. In this original manuscript, Balthazar is called Bithisarea, which later developed into Balthazar in Western Christianity.

In early artistic depictions, Balthazar was represented as a white man. In an 8th century text by the author Pseudo-Bede, he is described as being "a dark, fully bearded king”. From the 13th century onwards, he was occasionally depicted with black African servants. Balthazar was first depicted as a black African himself in the 15th century, in European Renaissance art. The increase in depictions of Balthazar as a black man from the 15th century onwards coincided with the development of the Portuguese Atlantic slave trade in the late 15th century.

By the 15th century, Balthazar was depicted in devotional triptychs more and more often as a man of color, though with European attributes of royalty:

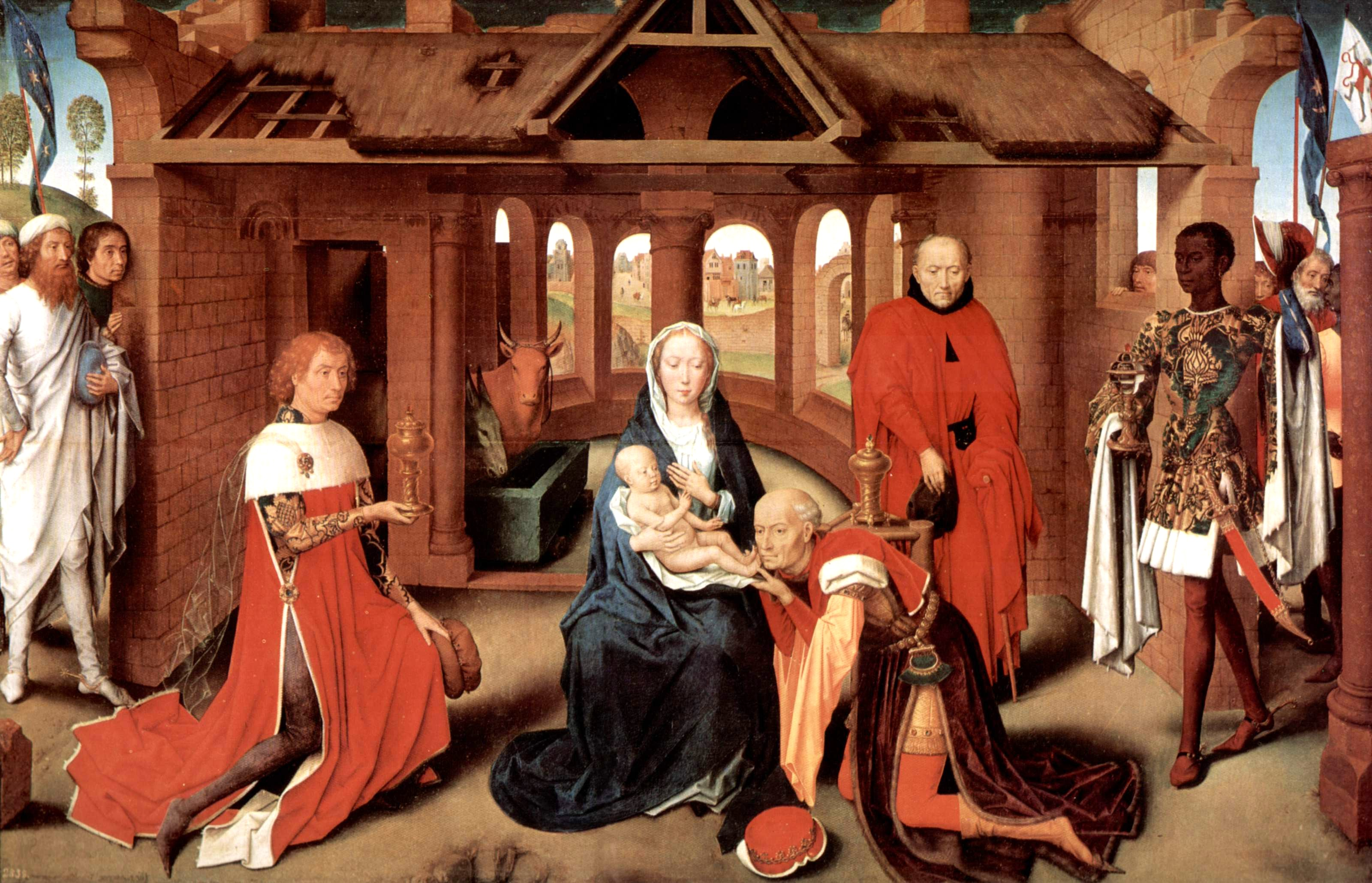
Hans Memling painted Balthazar in 1470 wearing ermine fur and holding a gift in the form of a covered beaker

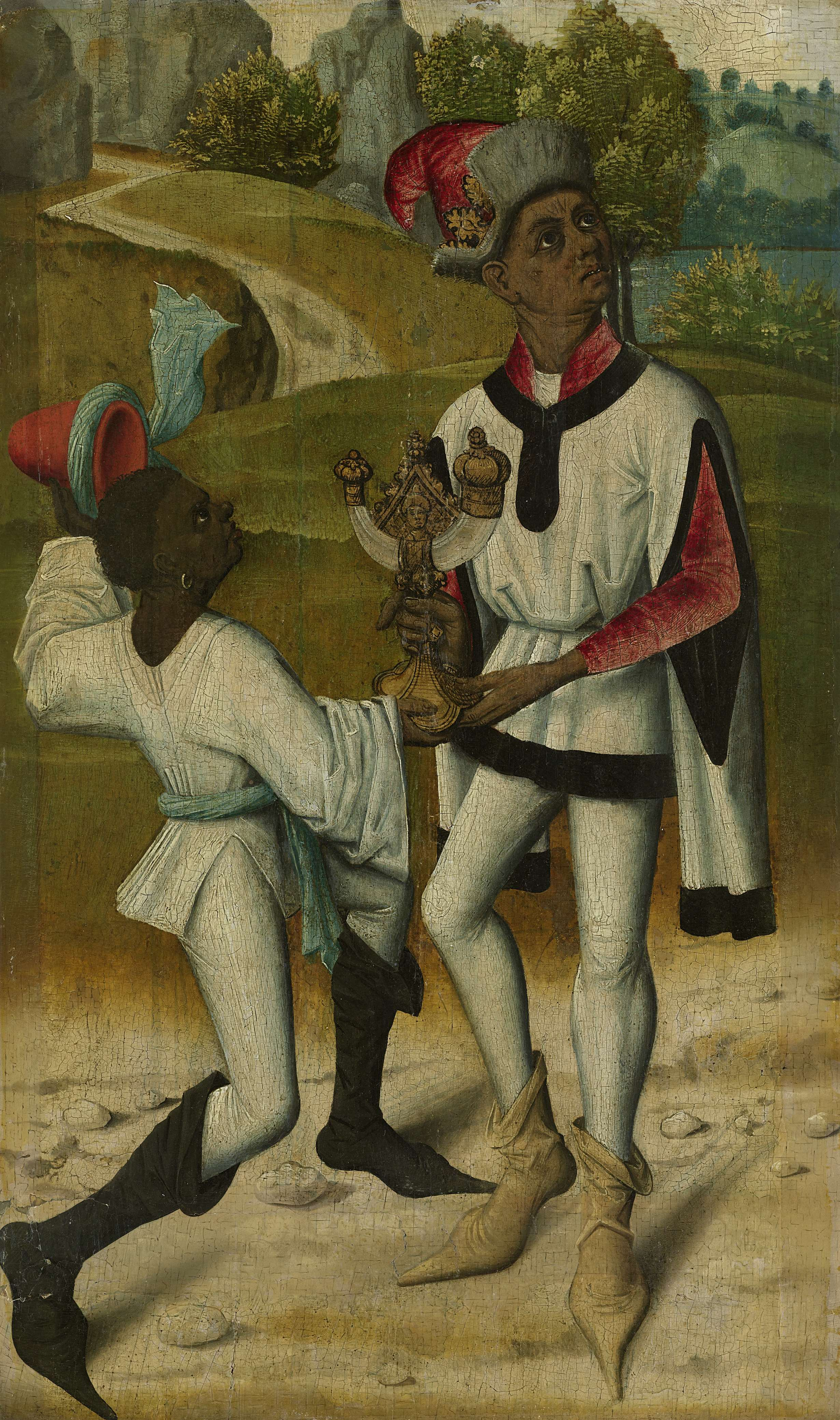
By the 1490s this gift was often in the shape of a horn

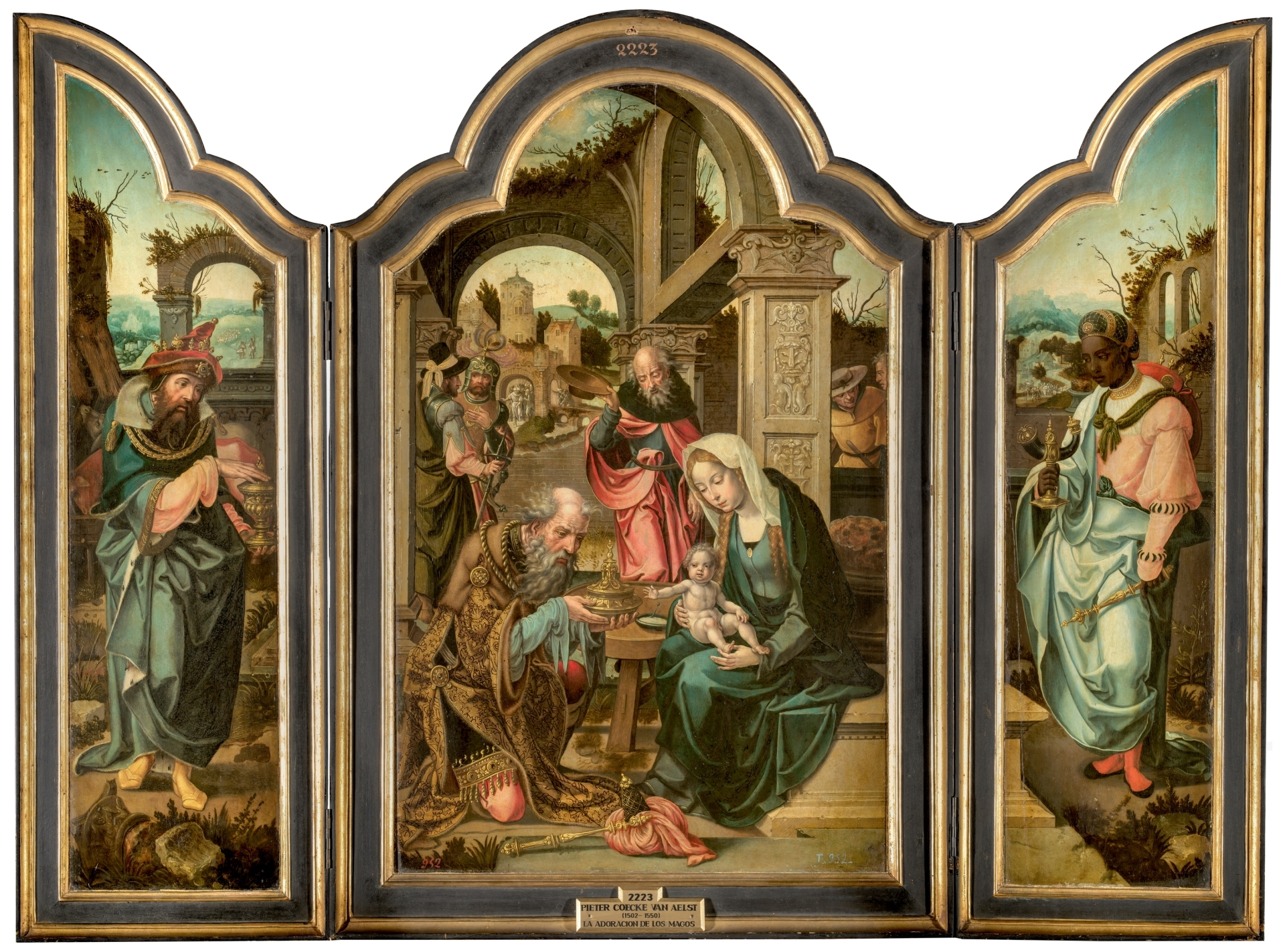
Pieter Coecke van Aelst painted Balthazar in 1530 with a similar horn beaker

As part of the Magi, Balthazar followed the Star of Bethlehem first to the palace of Herod the Great, who instructed them to return to him when they had found the Child Jesus. When they arrived at the manger, the Magi worshipped him and presented their gifts. Balthazar gave the gift of myrrh, which symbolised the future death of a king, as myrrh was an expensive item at the time. Following his return to his own country, avoiding King Herod, it is purported that Balthazar celebrated Christmas with the other members of the Magi in Armenia in 54 AD but later died on 6 January 55 AD, aged 112. The feast day of Balthazar is also 6 January, as the date of his death.

Balthasar and Gaspar, another of the Magi, are characters in the 1880 novel Ben-Hur: A Tale of the Christ and the various film adaptions of the novel, which chronicles his later years.

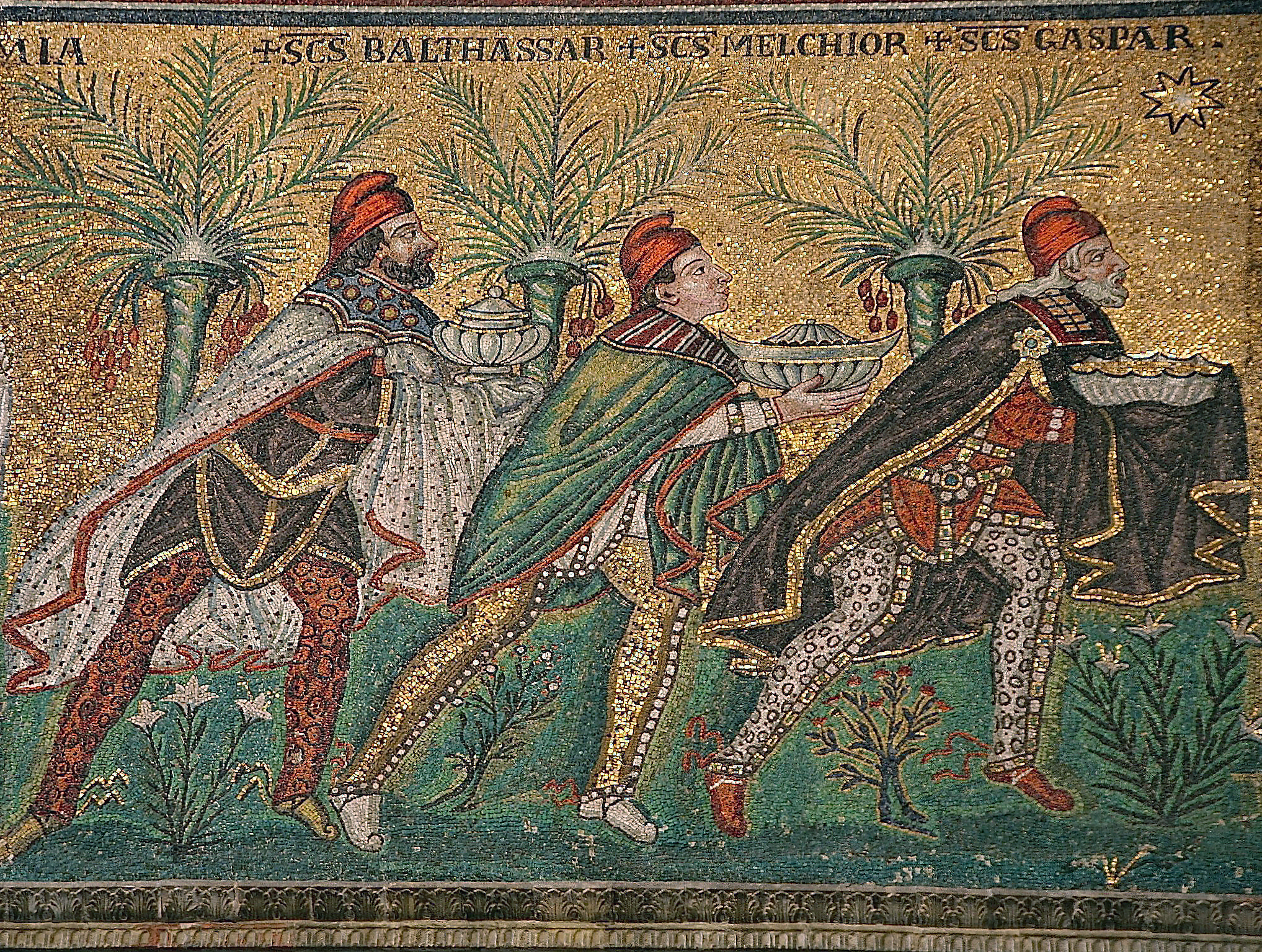
The Three Magi, Byzantine mosaic, c. 565 AD, Basilica of Sant'Apollinare Nuovo, Ravenna, Italy. Balthazar is depicted on the left.

== Identity ==
It is generally assumed that the Magi were of Zoroastrian origin. The Ethiopian Orthodox Tewahedo Church has an ancient tradition identifying Balthazar with Bazen of Axum.

== Commemoration ==
Balthazar, along with the other Magi, are purported to be buried in the Shrine of the Three Kings in Cologne Cathedral following his remains being moved from Constantinople by Eustorgius I in 344 AD to Milan. In 1164, Holy Roman Emperor Fredrick Barbarossa moved them to Cologne. Balthazar is commemorated on Epiphany with the other members of the Magi but in Catholicism, Balthazar's feast day is on 6 January because it was the day that he died.

The red alga Curdiea balthazar from Manawatāwhi Three Kings Islands is named after Balthazar.

== Blackface controversy and traditional iconic representation ==
Many traditionally Christian countries stage pageants that include roles for the three wise men. In some European countries it is customary for Balthazar to be portrayed by a man in blackface. In the 21st century, as modern immigration increased the Sub-Saharan African population, a number of campaigns in Spain pushed for an actual black person to play Balthazar, which potentially goes against the tradition that local city councillors play the role.

Since King Balthazar, in traditional pictorial representations from the Late Middle Ages, is often represented as a black person (as an integrating or cosmopolitan graphic symbol, in the tradition that the "wise men" or "magi" who worshipped Jesus in Bethlehem represented the peoples of the whole world), fitting in with this traditional icon motivated his representation in the cavalcades of Three Wise Men by a person made up in black. In many Spanish towns that custom continues, while others now ask a prominent resident of African descent to take on this role in the cavalcades.

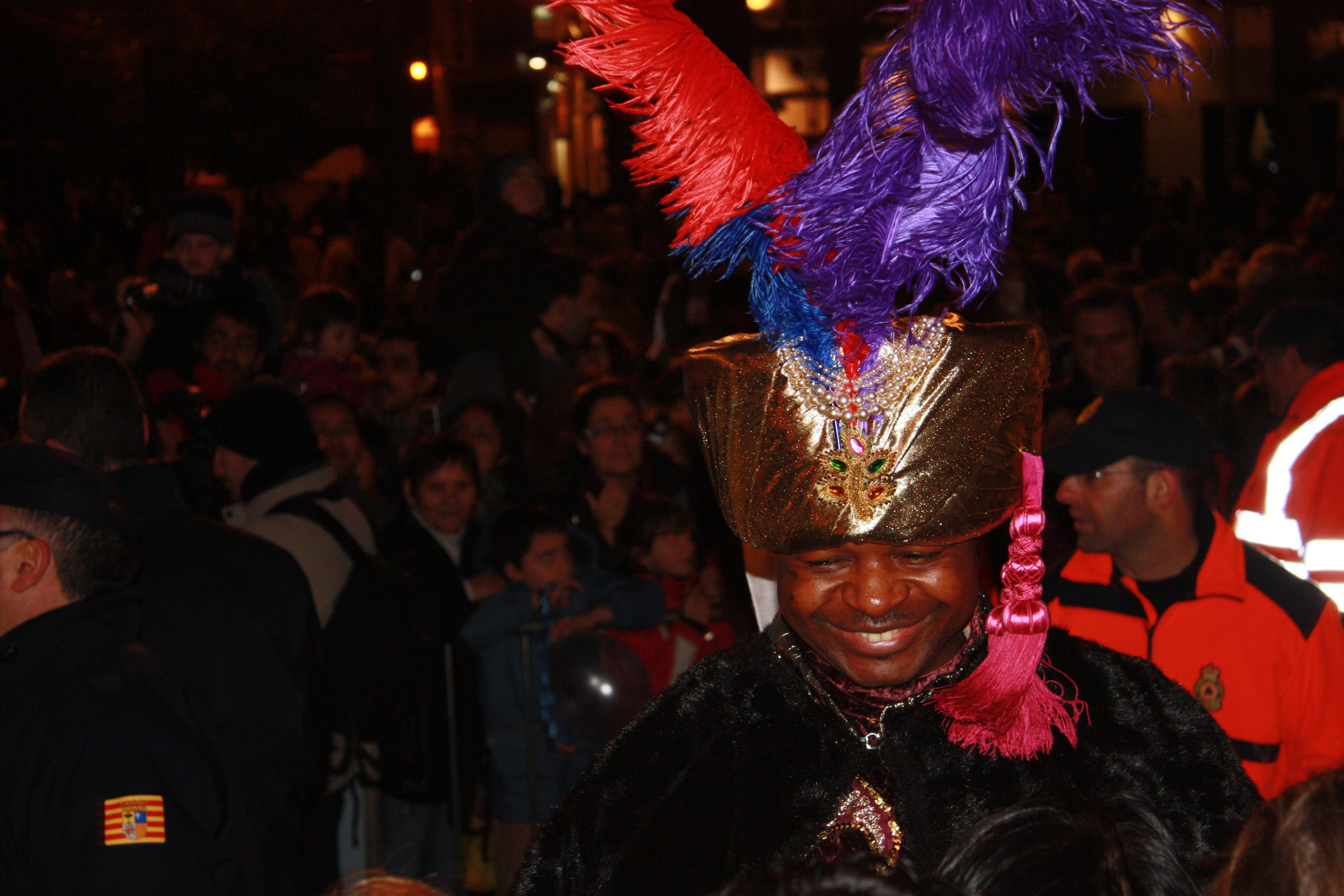
A black man parading as Balthazar in Zaragoza in 2009

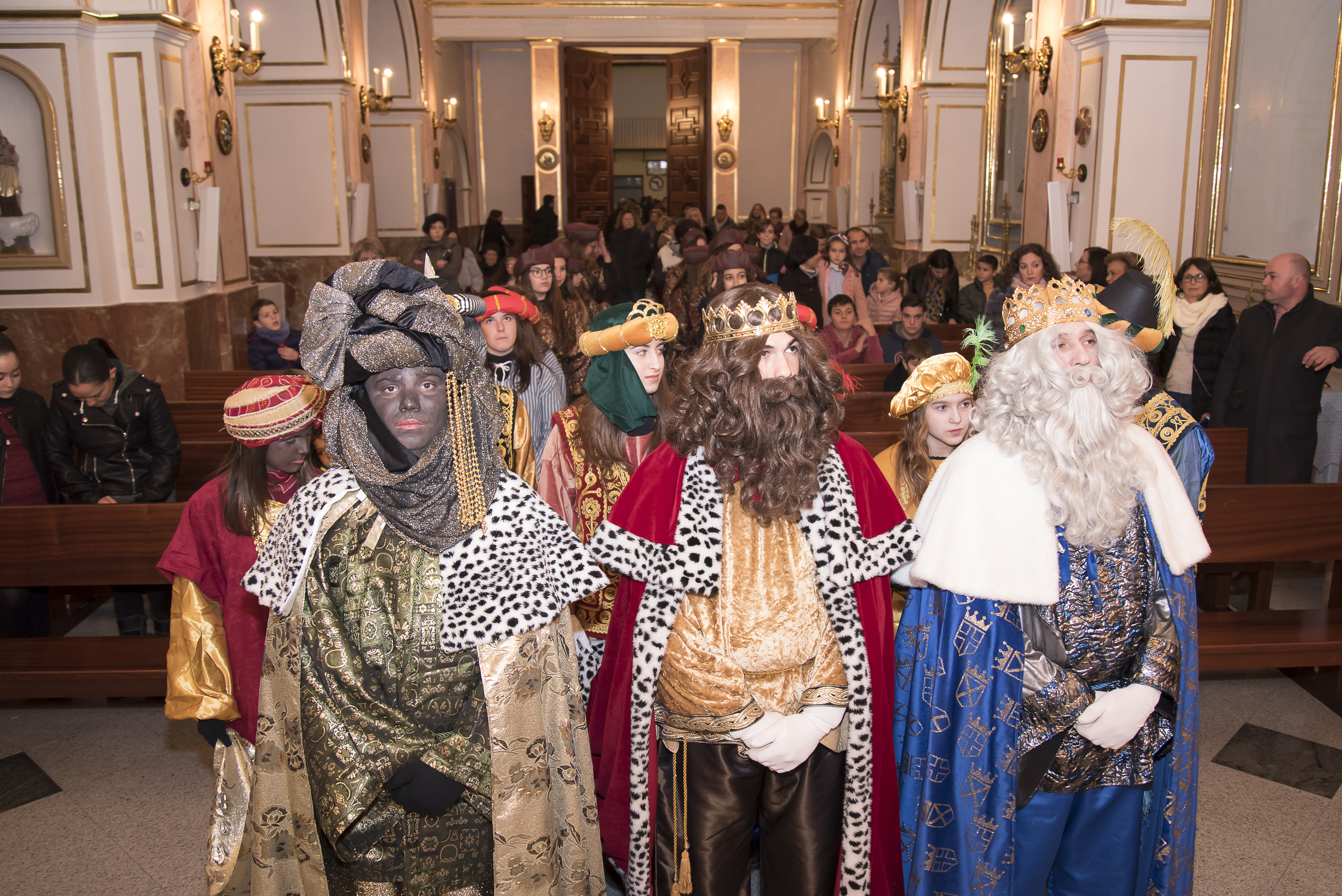
The three magi in Massalfassar in 2019. Balthazar and his servant are played by white people in blackface.

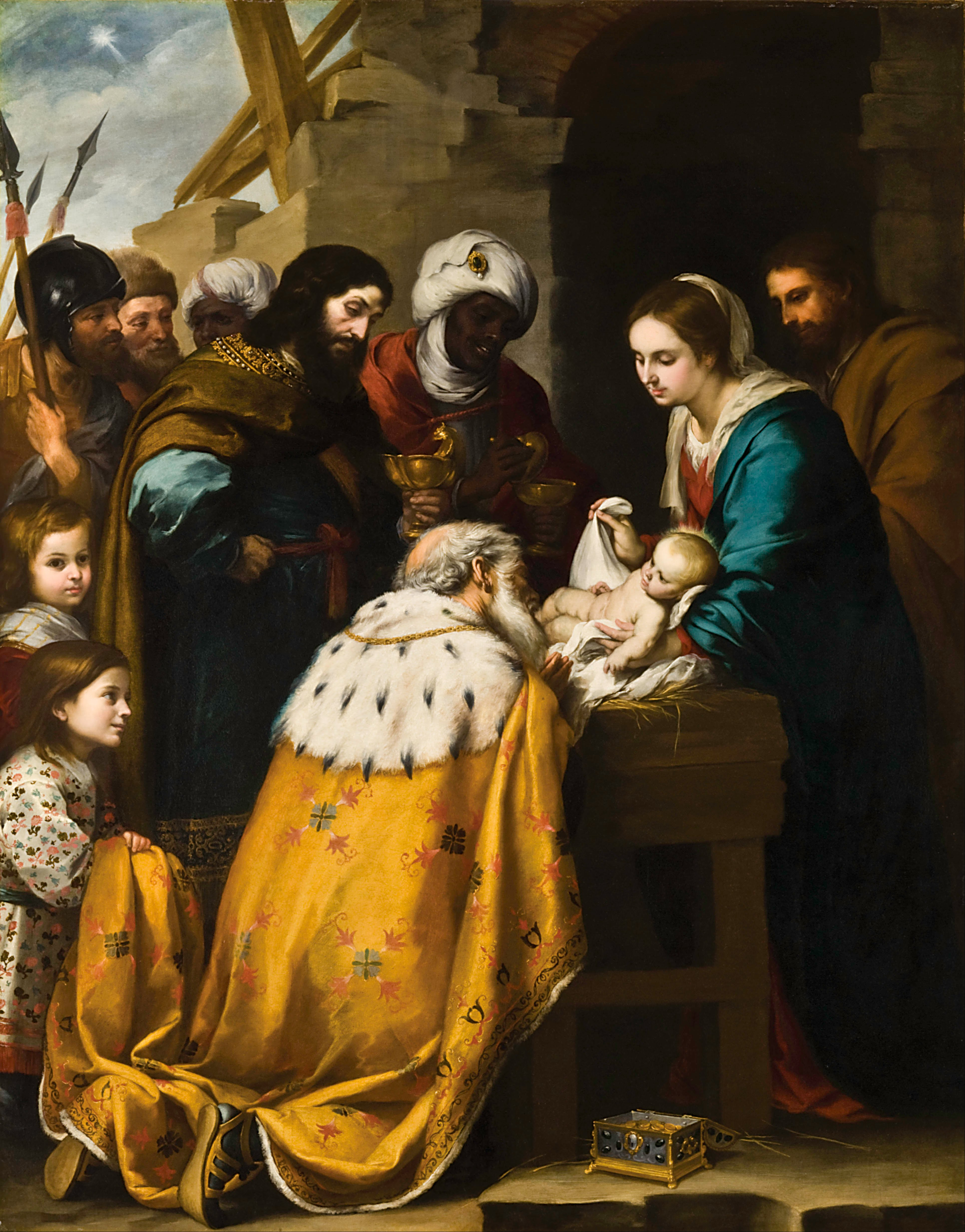
Adorazione dei Magi (Adoration of the Magi) by Bartolomé Esteban Murillo, c. 1655 (Toledo Museum of Art, Ohio)

== Bibliography ==
- Collins, Kristen; Keene, Bryan C., eds. (2023). Balthazar: A Black African King in Medieval and Renaissance Art. Getty Publications. ISBN 9781606067857.

== See also ==
- San Baltasar
