= John Henry Hopkins Jr. =

American clergyman and hymnodist (1820–1891)

- Born: October 28, 1820; Pittsburgh, Pennsylvania, U.S.
- Died: August 14, 1891 (aged 70); Hudson, New York, U.S.
- Education: University of Vermont (A.B.); General Theological Seminary
- Occupations: Clergyman; hymnodist
- Employers: General Theological Seminary; Trinity Church, Plattsburgh; Christ Episcopal Church, Williamsport
- Notable work: "Three Kings of Orient"
- Father: John Henry Hopkins

John Henry Hopkins Jr. (October 28, 1820 – August 14, 1891) was an American clergyman and hymnodist, most famous for composing the song "Three Kings of Orient" (presently known as "We Three Kings") in 1857 (although it does not appear in print until his Carols, Hymns, and Songs in 1863).

== Life ==
Hopkins was born in Pittsburgh, Pennsylvania, the son of John Henry Hopkins, an Episcopal bishop. Hopkins graduated from the University of Vermont with an A.B. in 1839, and then a Master's Degree in 1845. After a stint as a journalist, he graduated from the General Theological Seminary in 1850, and became a deacon, author, illustrator, and designer. He was the seminary's first music teacher from 1855 to 1857, composed several hymns, and edited the Church Journal.

He wrote words and music to his most famous hymn, "Three Kings of Orient", as part of a Christmas pageant for his nieces and nephews. It is suggested to have been written in 1857 but did not appear in print until his Carols, Hymns, and Songs in 1863.

Hopkins served as rector of Trinity Church in Plattsburgh, New York, from 1872 to 1876 and of Christ Episcopal Church in Williamsport, Pennsylvania from 1876 to 1887. He delivered the eulogy at the funeral of President Ulysses S. Grant in 1885 and, in 1891, died in Hudson, New York. He was buried next to his father at Bishop's House, Rock Point, Burlington, Vermont. Hopkins's nephew, Charles Filkins Sweet, wrote a biography of him entitled A Champion of the Cross, Being the Life of John Henry Hopkins, S.T.D.

Another nephew, John Henry Hopkins III, is credited with writing the music for "I Sing a Song of the Saints of God", a popular children's hymn in the Episcopal Church in America.
