= San Cristoforo sul Naviglio =

Church in Milan, Italy

Coordinates: 45°26′52″N 9°09′17″E

Church of Saint Christopher sul Naviglio (Chiesa di San Cristoforo sul Naviglio)
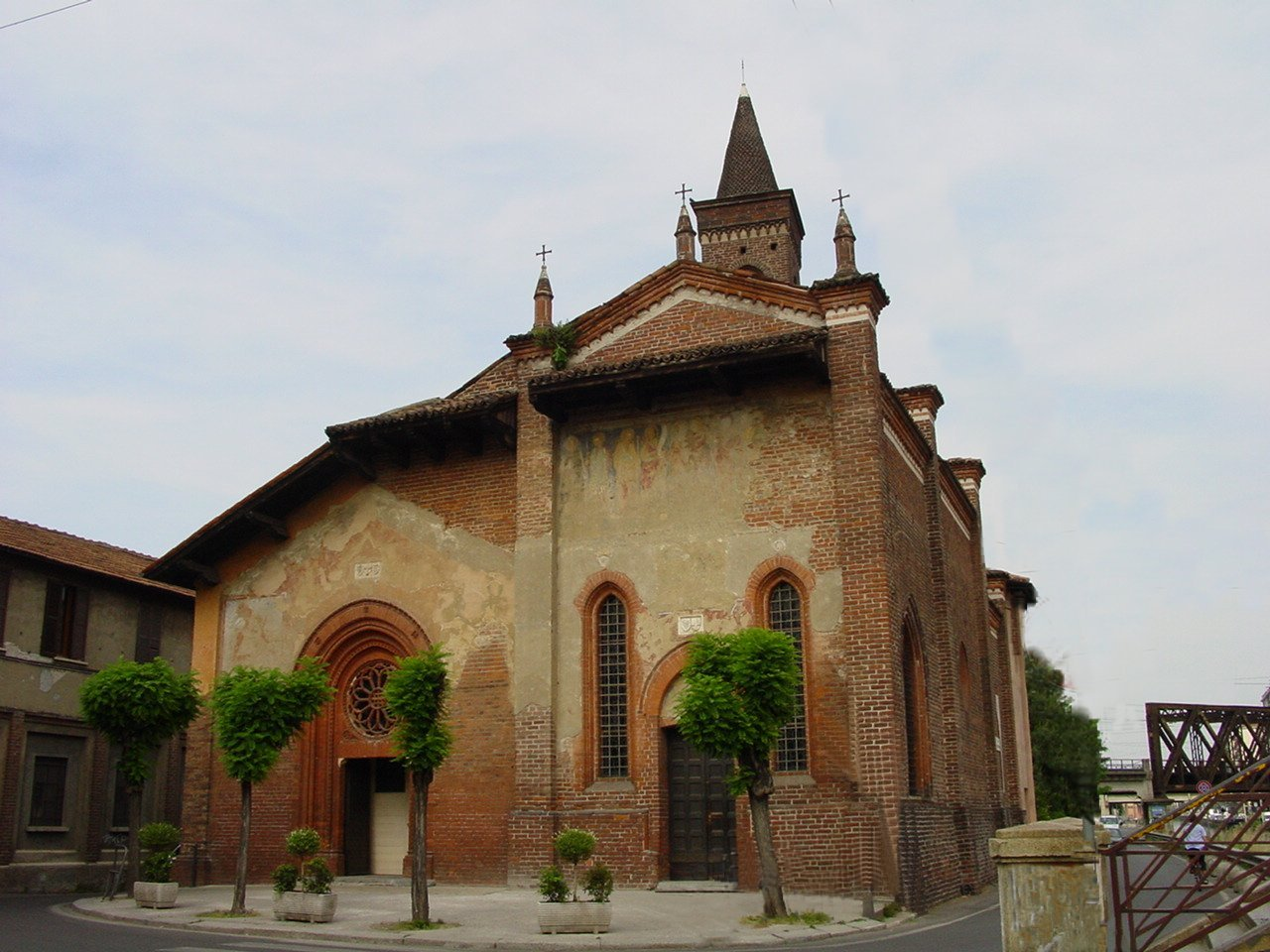
- The façade of the church.

Religion
- Affiliation: Roman Catholic
- Province: Milan
- Status: Active

Location
- Location: Milan, Italy
- Interactive map of Church of Saint Christopher sul Naviglio (Chiesa di San Cristoforo sul Naviglio)

Architecture
- Type: Church
- Style: Gothic

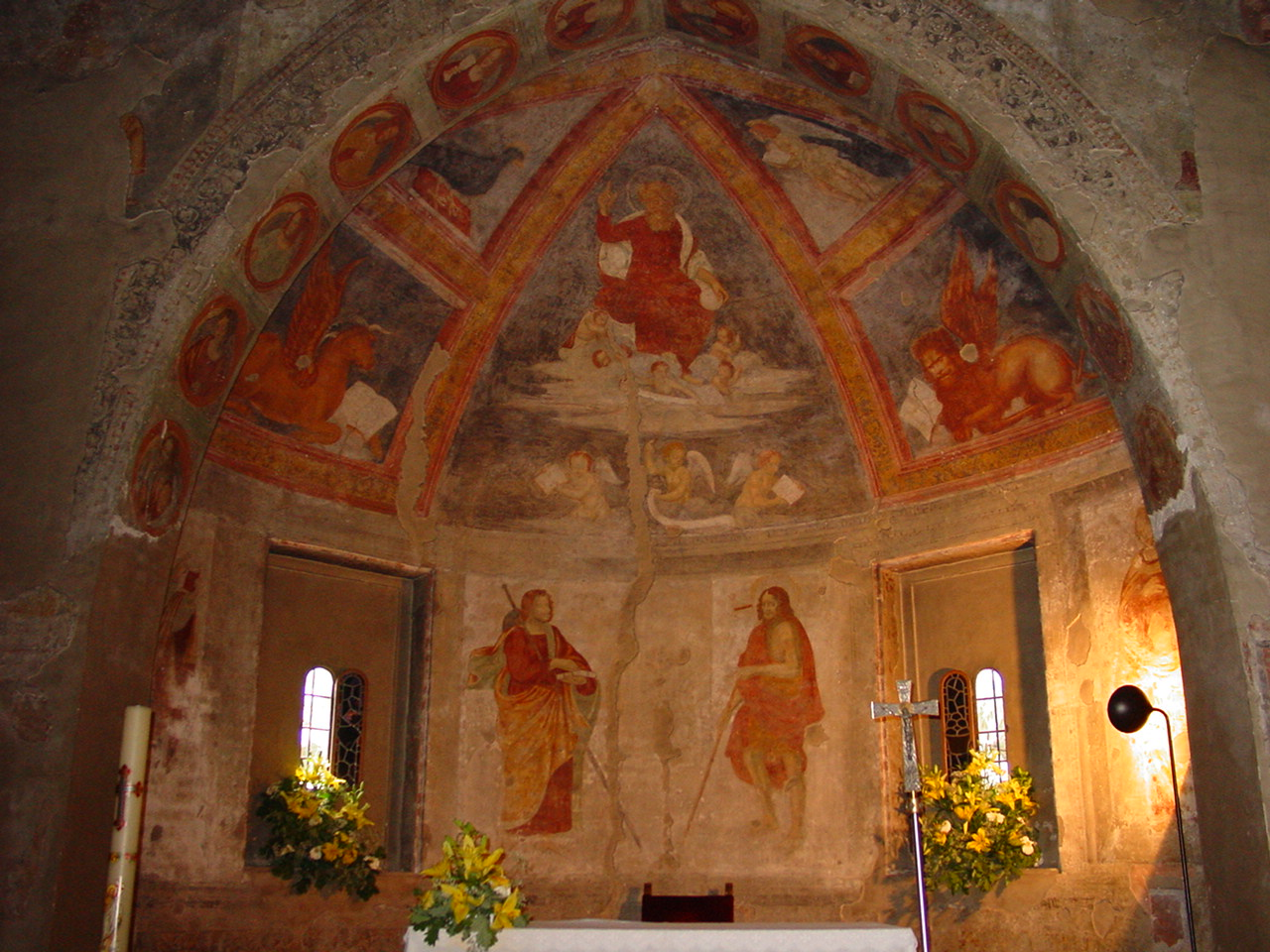
The frescoed apse

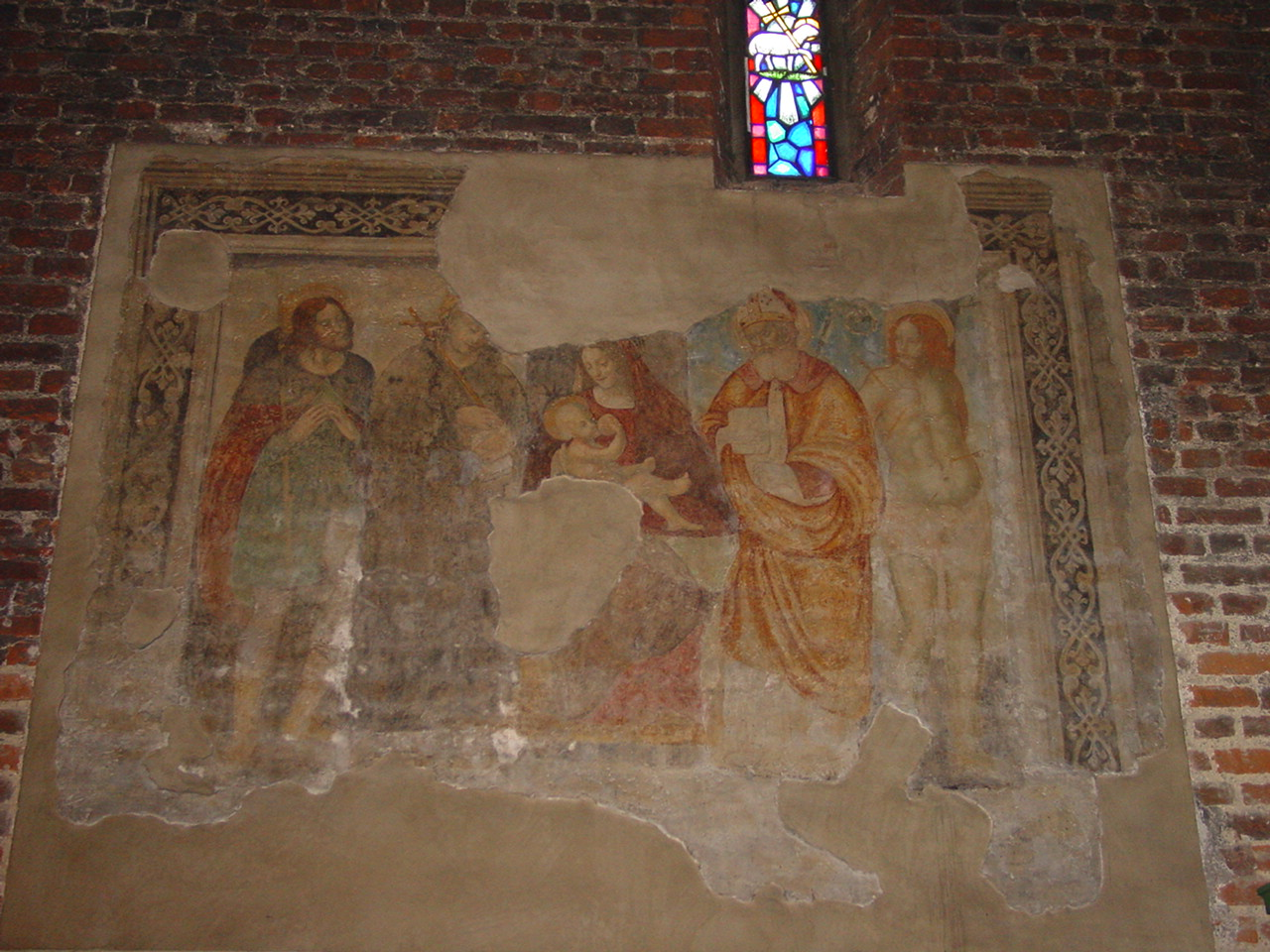
Fresco in the wall of the older church

San Cristoforo sul Naviglio is a church in Milan, northern Italy.

== History ==
The complex is composed of two churches. The left one is the most ancient, which is known to be a Romanesque reconstruction of a far more ancient edifice (probably in turn located on the site of a Roman temple). The Romanesque edifice was again rebuilt in the 13th century, when the Naviglio Grande was excavated. In the mid-14th century it received the Gothic portal and rose window.

The Gothic church was flanked by a hospital, built around 1364.

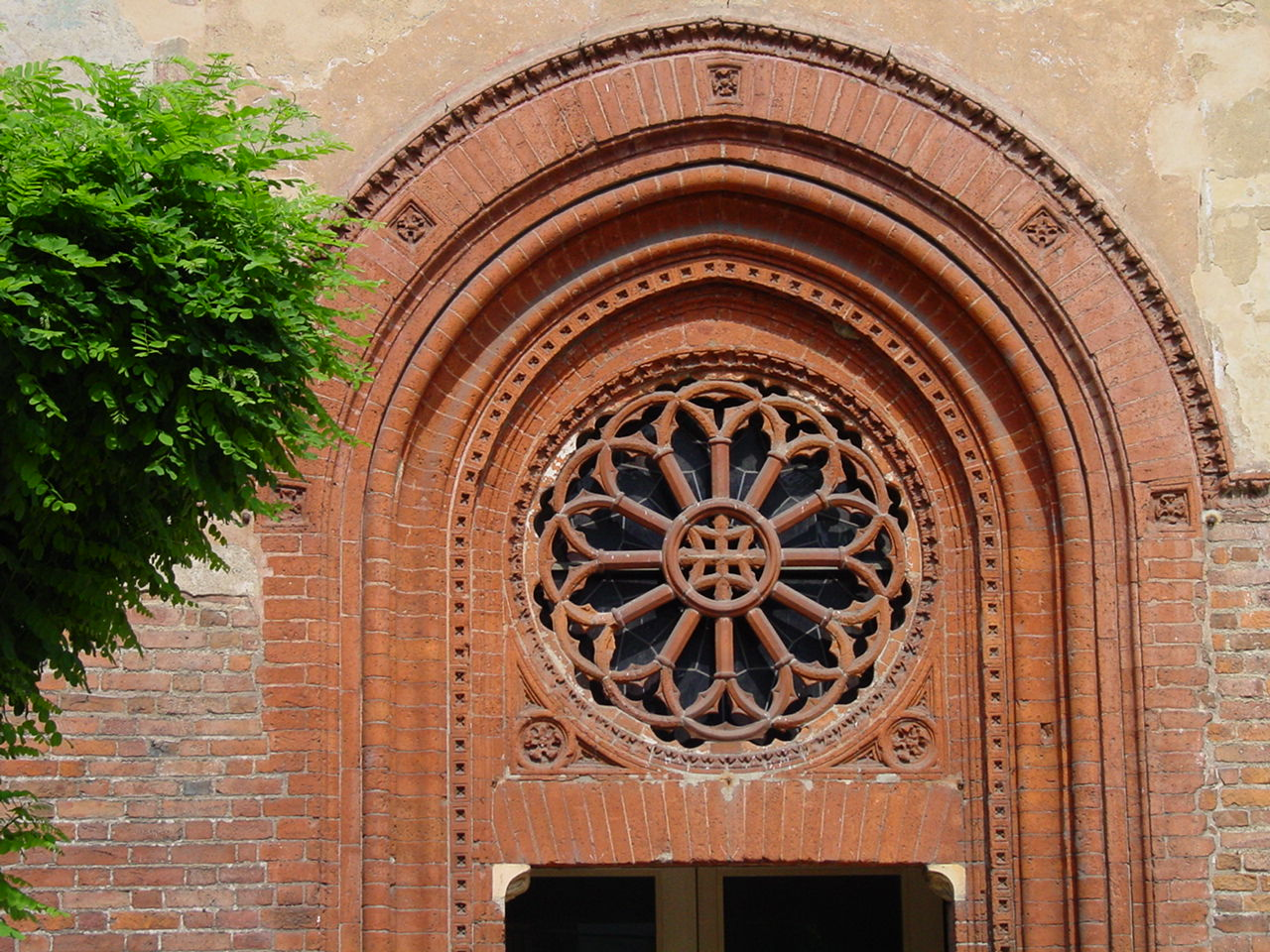
The Gothic portal with rose window.

The more recent church, which currently is united to the other and gives the appearance of a single edifice, was constructed along the naviglio (navigational canal) bank in the 15th century, and then called Ducal Chapel. It was commissioned by Duke Gian Galeazzo Visconti in order to provide a holy edifice and dedicated to St Christopher, the protector of ill people. The intercession of St Christopher was said to have ended the onslaught of the plague during 1399, that had killed some 20,000 Milanese. The chapel was also dedicated to the Saints John the Baptist and James, Blessed Christina, all protectors of the House of Visconti. The façade sports the Visconti coat of arms, while the older church has the heraldic symbols of Cardinal Pietro Filargo, then bishop of Milan and later pope as Alexander V.

In 1405 the counterfaçade of the Ducal Chapel was decorated with a Madonna Enthroned and Saints and a Crucifixion inspired by that in San Marco of Milan.

== Architecture and art ==
The Romanesque church is a small hall ending with a small semicircular apse. The façade has a richly decorated brickwork portal with a Gothic rose window. The façade of the Ducal Chapel has a simple portal flanked by Gothic mullioned windows, according to a model established by Guiniforte Solari, and traces of frescoes of Saints from the 15th century.

The current bell tower is a 15th-century enlargement of the original one, with conical cusp and mullioned windows.

The interior, turned into two naves in 1625 with the demolition of the wall separating the two churches, has a wooden ceiling in the left nave with fragments of frescoes by Bergognone on the wall. The apse houses frescoes of Bernardino Luini's school, portraying the Father with Angels and the symbols of the Evangelists, and Saints. The right nave has two spans with Gothic frescoes on the walls. There is also a notable wooden statue (14th century) representing St. Christopher and the Child.
