= Protasius (bishop of Milan) =

Italian bishop and saint

- Archbishop of Milan
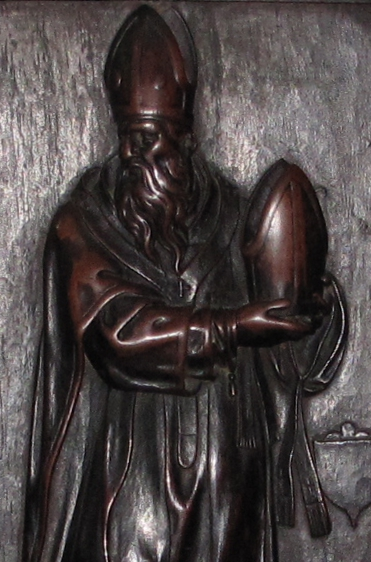
- Wooden statue of St Protasius
- Church: Catholic Church; Eastern Orthodox Church
- Appointed: 328 AD
- Term ended: c. 343 AD
- Predecessor: Maternus
- Successor: Eustorgius I

Personal details
- Born: c. 3rd century AD
- Died: c. 343 AD Milan, Italy, Roman Empire

Sainthood
- Feast day: 24 November
- Venerated in: Roman Catholic Church; Eastern Orthodox Church; Lutheranism; Anglicanism
- Shrines: Oratorio di San Protaso

Protasius (Italian: Protaso) was Archbishop of Milan. He is honored as a saint in the Catholic Church, with his feast day celebrated on 24 November, the day of his death.

== Life ==
Almost nothing is known about the life of Protasius. He was elected bishop of Milan in 328, and served until his death, about 343.

Athanasius of Alexandria, in his Apologia ad Constantium, mentioned that Protasius was with him when he spoke to the Roman Emperor Constantius II; this episode can be dated about 342 or 343. In 343, Protasius attended the Council of Sardica and signed its decrees, standing up against the Arians and supporting the faith of the Council of Nicaea.

Protasius died about 343 on 24 November. His body was buried in Milan in the Church of San Vittore al Corpo (Saint Victor Maurus), where it is venerated still. A late tradition, with no historical basis, associates Protasius with a Milanese family, the Algisi.
