= Eustorgius I =

Bishop of Milan from 343 to about 349

Saint Eustorgius I
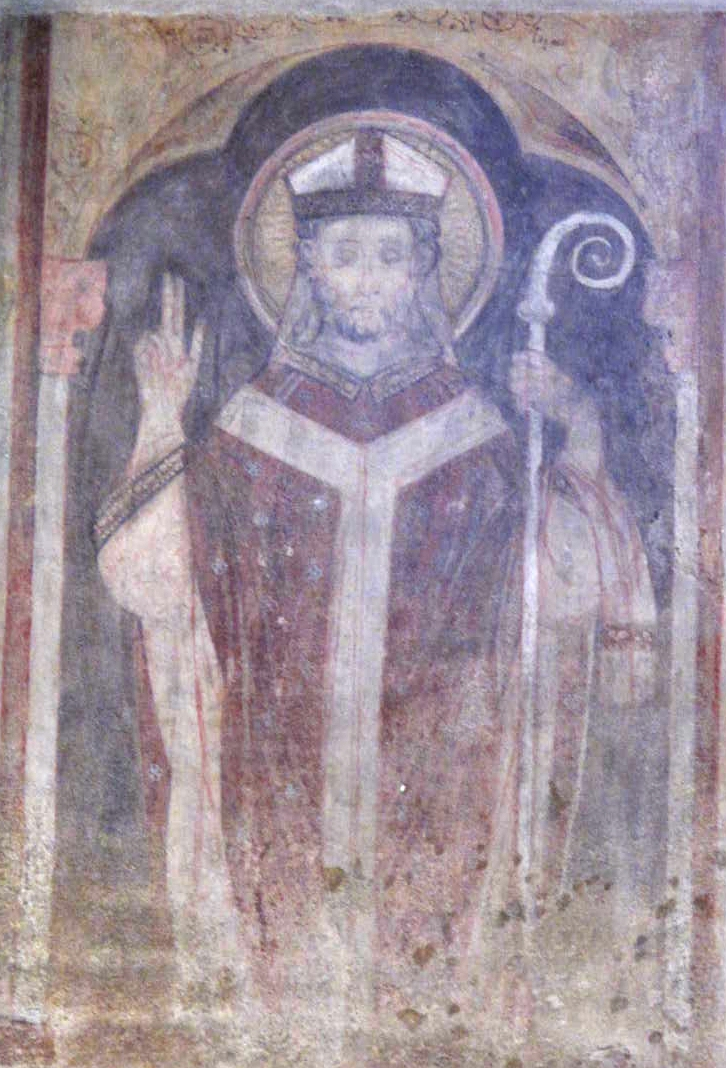
- Fresco of Saint Eustorgius, in Basilica of Sant'Eustorgio, Milan
- See: Mediolanum
- Appointed: 343 AD
- Term ended: c. 349 AD
- Predecessor: Protasius
- Successor: Dionysius

Personal details
- Born: 275 AD Greece, Roman Empire
- Died: 18 September c. 349 AD Milan, Roman Italy, Roman Empire

Sainthood
- Feast day: September 18
- Venerated in: Catholic Church; Eastern Orthodox Church
- Shrines: Basilica of Sant'Eustorgio, Milan

Eustorgius I (Italian: Eustorgio, born 275 AD - died c. 349 AD) was bishop of Milan from 343 to about 349. He is honoured as a Saint in both the Catholic Church and the Eastern Orthodox Church. His feast day is on the September 18.

== Life ==
According to tradition, Eustorgius was a noble Greek. He was the legate of Milan and was elected as bishop at the death of Protasius in 343. Eustorgius traveled to Constantinople to have his election as bishop confirmed by the Emperor, and on that occasion, the Emperor donated to him the relics of the Three Magi which he translated from Constantinople to Milan.

From 345 to 346 and from 347 to 348, he held two synods. He also began the construction of churches and basilicas in Milan. Saint Athanasius called him a "defender of the faith" and mentions him as an opponent of Arianism. Saint Ambrose called him by the honorable title of "confessor", and just in such a way some verses concerning Milan in ca. 700. His name was included in the Ambrosian Rite and his cult in Milan is testified by the presence of five churches dedicated to him (as testified in a 14th-century document, Liber notitiae sanctorum Mediolani ), the best known of which is the Basilica of Sant'Eustorgio. A 5th or 6th century song indicates that he was a famous holy man and that he had built a great sarcophagus and two little cows had transported the large shrine. Eustorgius was perhaps buried in the cemetery on the grounds of Sant'Eustorgio, which was located outside the Roman walls along the road to Pavia., and then in his church which was dedicated by him. His relics are in the main altar. For September 18, the Roman Martyrology states: "At Milan, St. Eustorgius I, Bishop of that city, rendered by the testimony of blessed Ambrose."

== Legend ==
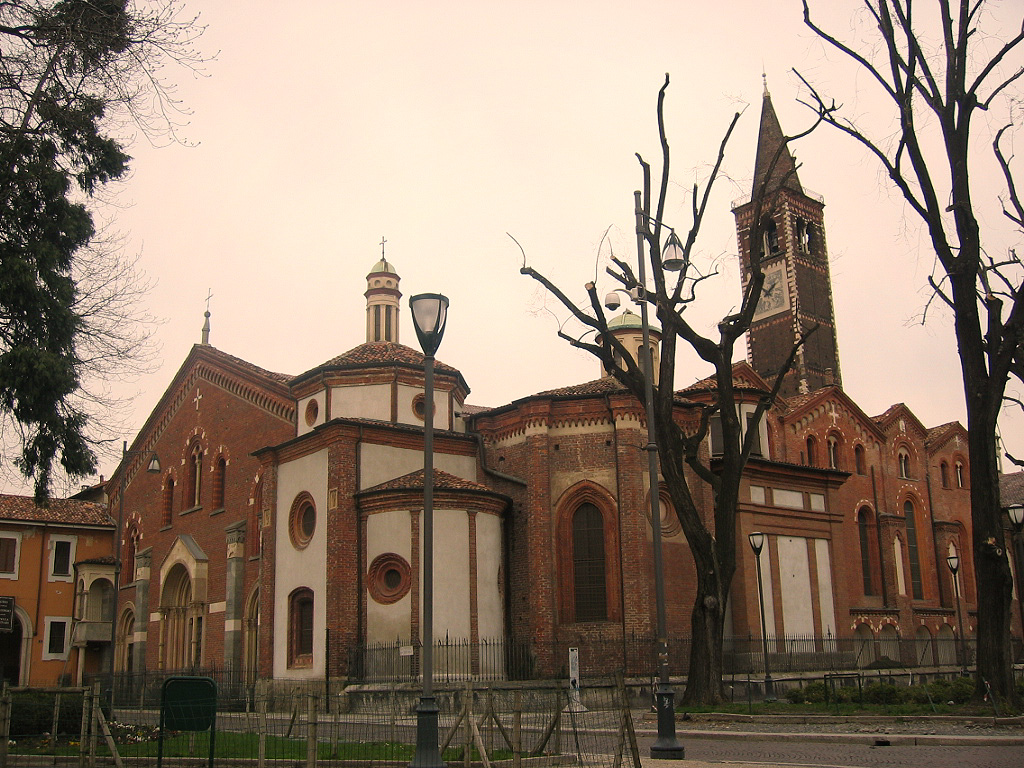
The right side of the Basilica of Sant'Eustorgio.

His legendary Vita dates from the 12th century and exists in 20 different documents. His legend states that in 344, he brought the relics of the Three Magi from Constantinople to Milan, with two small cows which transported a large sarcophagus of marble. (Photo: Empty shrine in St. Eustorgio, ca. 300 AD)

The relics of the Magi - Stefan Lochner paints a picture in 1445 - were taken from Milan by Holy Roman Emperor Fredrick Barbarossa and given to the Archbishop of Cologne, Rainald of Dassel, in 1164. A Shrine of the Three Kings at Cologne Cathedral still exists (a part of these relics were returned to the Basilica of Sant'Eustorgio of Milan in 1904).

"In the days of Philipp of Heinsberg, who followed Reinaldus, the shrine of the three magi was built. This was told to me by some eyewitnesses who were present when the three magi were put into the shrine." (Vita Eustorgii))

The Vita Beati Eustorgii Confessoris reports around the year 1200:

"... The holy Helena, mother of the emperor Constantine, was one with all virtues affected and a very much pious woman regarding the Christian religion. ... She traveled in own person through those widen countries of the Roman realm to the Orient and to the Western World. There she built over the bodies of the martyrs, who were killed by cruelty of tyrants because their Christian names, substantial memorials. Apart from the many fameful proofs of her piety to God she also accumulated the bodies of the Three Magi together, who were buried in different places, and Helena brought the bodies towards Constantinople. In this city they remained in large honours until the times of the emperor Manuel."
