= Victory Day (9 May) =

Public holidays in Russia and some post-Soviet states

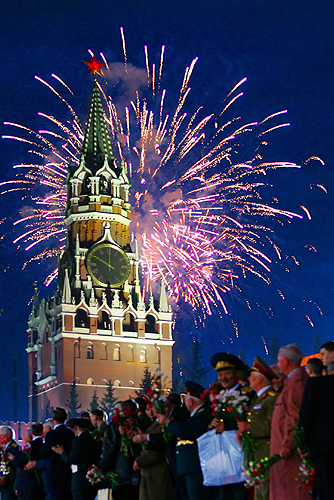
- Victory Day celebrations in Moscow, 9 May 2005
- Official name: Russian: День Победы etc. (Note: Russian: День Победы, romanized: Den' Pobedy Belarusian: Дзень Перамогі, romanized: Dzěň Pěramohi Uzbek: Ғалаба куни, romanized: Gʻalaba kuni/Ğalaba kuni Kazakh: Жеңіс Күні, romanized: Jeñis Küni Georgian: გამარჯვების დღე, romanized: Gamarjvebis dğe Azerbaijani: Qələbə Günü Romanian: Ziua Victoriei (Moldovan Cyrillic: Зиуа Викторией) Kyrgyz: Жеңиш майрамы, romanized: Jeñiş mayramı Tajik: Рӯзи Ғалаба, romanized: Rúzi Ğalaba Armenian: Հաղթանակի օրը, romanized: Haqtanaki orë Turkmen: Ýeňişlar Harçlaarsiň Hebrew: יום הניצחון)
- Observed by: Several post-Soviet states: Armenia, Azerbaijan, Belarus, Georgia, Kazakhstan, Kyrgyzstan, Russia, Tajikistan, Turkmenistan, Uzbekistan; Other countries: Bosnia and Herzegovina, Croatia, Israel, Mongolia, Montenegro, Serbia
- Date: 9 May
- Next time: 9 May 2027
- Frequency: Annual
- Related to: Victory in Europe Day

Victory Day is a holiday that commemorates the victory of the Soviet Union over Nazi Germany in 1945. It was first inaugurated in the 15 republics of the Soviet Union (Note: There were 16 republics in the Soviet Union in 1945. The Karelo-Finnish SSR was abolished in 1956.) following the signing of the German Instrument of Surrender late in the evening on 8 May 1945 (9 May Moscow Time). The Soviet government announced the victory early on 9 May after the signing ceremony in Berlin. Although the official inauguration occurred in 1945, the holiday became a non-labor day only in 1965.

In East Germany, 8 May was observed as Liberation Day from 1950 to 1966, and was celebrated again on the 40th anniversary in 1985. In 1967, a Soviet-style "Victory Day" was celebrated on 8 May.

The Russian Federation has officially recognized 9 May since its formation in 1991 and considers it a non-working holiday even if it falls on a weekend (in which case any following Monday will be a non-working holiday). The holiday was similarly celebrated while the country was part of the Soviet Union. Most other countries in Europe observe Victory in Europe Day (often abbreviated to VE Day, or V-E Day) on 8 May, and Europe Day (Note: In 1950 on Victory Day (9 May), French foreign minister Robert Schuman made the Schuman Declaration proposing creation of the European Coal and Steel Community as a way to prevent further war between France and Germany. He declared he aimed to "make war not only unthinkable but materially impossible". It is now celebrated as Europe Day on 5 May by the Council of Europe.) on 9 May as national remembrance or victory days.

== History ==
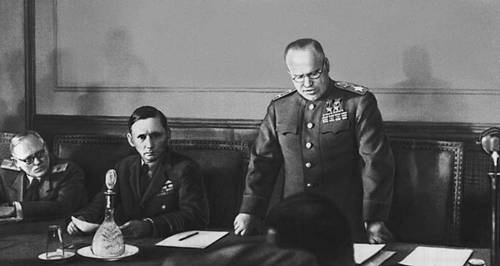
Marshal Zhukov reading the German capitulation. Seated on his right is Air Chief Marshal Arthur Tedder.

Field-Marshal Keitel signing the ratified surrender terms for the German military

"Victory Banner #5", raised on the roof of the Reichstag building

The German Instrument of Surrender was signed twice. An initial document was signed in Reims, France on 7 May 1945 by Alfred Jodl (chief of staff of the German OKW) for Germany, Walter Bedell Smith (USA), on behalf of the Supreme Commander of the Allied Expeditionary Force, and Ivan Susloparov, on behalf of the Soviet High Command, in the presence of Free French Major-General François Sevez as the official witness. Since the Soviet High Command had not agreed to the text of the surrender, and because Susloparov, a relatively low-ranking officer, was not authorized to sign this document, the Soviet Union requested that a second, revised, instrument of surrender be signed in Berlin. Joseph Stalin declared that the Soviet Union considered the Reims surrender a preliminary document, and Dwight D. Eisenhower immediately agreed with that. Another argument was that some German troops considered the Reims instrument of surrender as a surrender to the Western Allies only, and fighting continued in the East, especially in Prague.

[Quoting Stalin:] Today, in Reims, Germans signed the preliminary act on an unconditional surrender. The main contribution, however, was done by Soviet people and not by the Allies, therefore the capitulation must be signed in front of the Supreme Command of all countries of the anti-Hitler coalition, and not only in front of the Supreme Command of Allied Forces. Moreover, I disagree that the surrender was not signed in Berlin, which was the center of Nazi aggression. We agreed with the Allies to consider the Reims protocol as preliminary.

A second surrender ceremony was organized in the outskirts of Berlin late on 8 May, when it was already 9 May in Moscow due to the difference in time zones. Field-Marshal Wilhelm Keitel, chief of OKW, signed a final German Instrument of Surrender, which was also signed by Marshal Georgy Zhukov, on behalf of the Supreme High Command of the Red Army, and Air Chief Marshal Arthur Tedder (Britain), on behalf of the Allied Expeditionary Force, in the presence of General Carl Spaatz (USA) and General Jean de Lattre de Tassigny (Free French), as witnesses. The surrender was signed in the Soviet Army headquarters in Berlin-Karlshorst. Both English and Russian versions of the instrument of surrender signed in Berlin were considered authentic texts.

The revised Berlin text of the instrument of surrender differed from the preliminary text signed in Reims in explicitly stipulating the complete disarmament of all German military forces, handing over their weapons to local Allied military commanders.

Both the Reims and Berlin instruments of surrender stipulated that forces under German control to cease active operations at 23:01 hours CET on 8 May 1945. However, due to the difference in Central European and Moscow time zones, the end of war is celebrated on 9 May in the Soviet Union and most post-Soviet countries.

To commemorate the victory in the war, the ceremonial Moscow Victory Parade was held in the Soviet capital on 24 June 1945.

== Celebrations ==
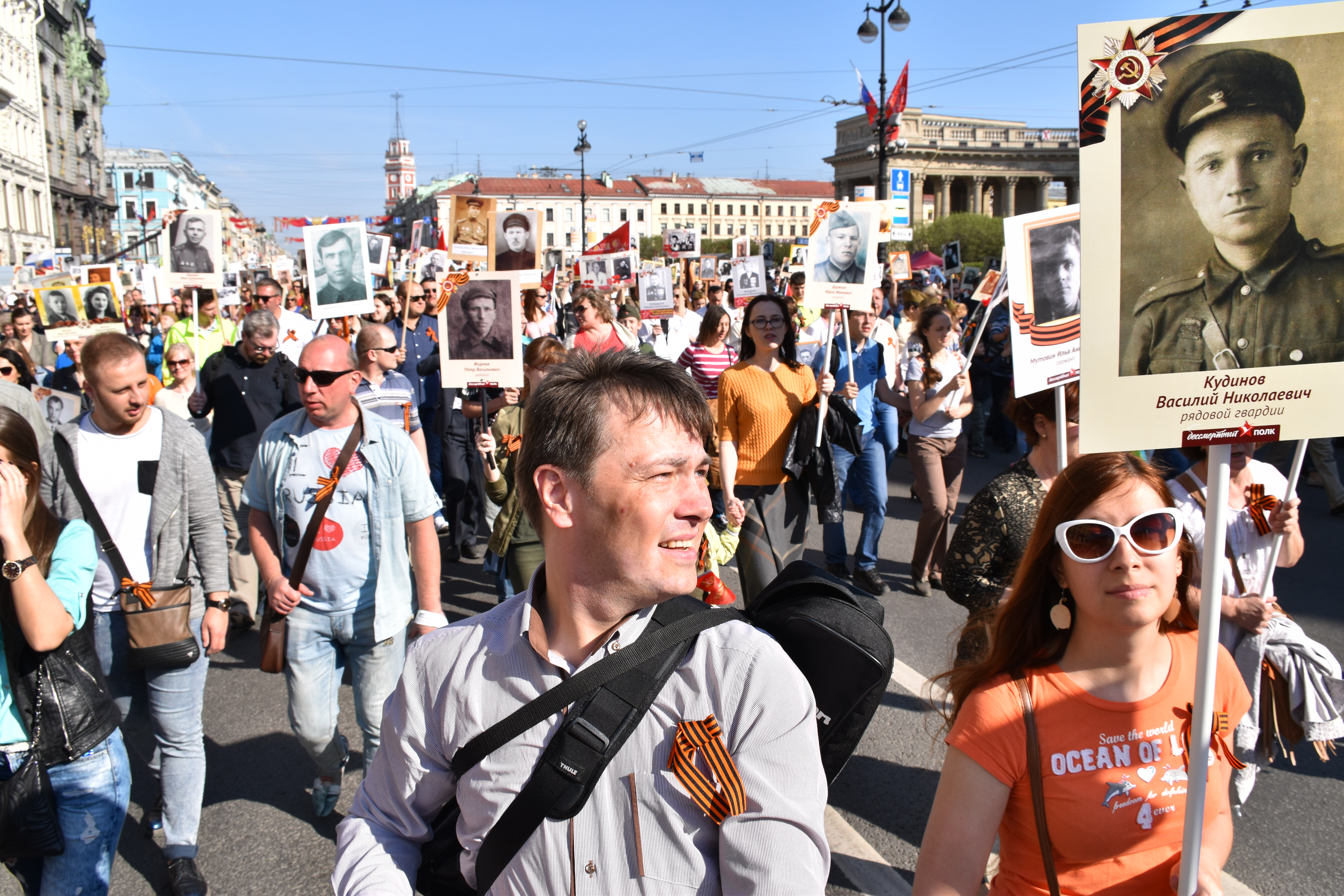
People in Saint Petersburg at the Immortal Regiment, carrying portraits of their ancestors who fought in the Great Patriotic War (World War II)

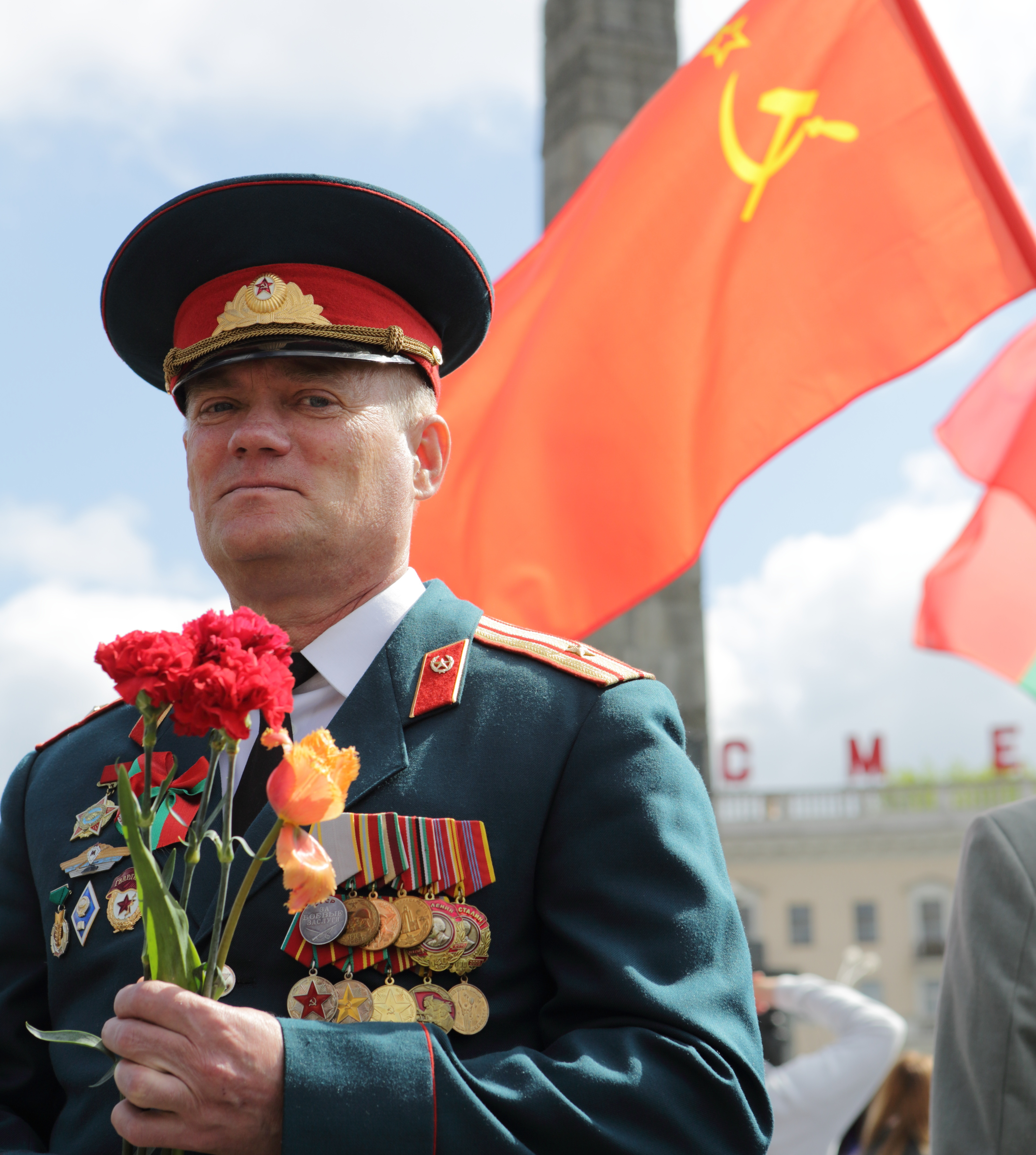
A member of the Armed Forces of Belarus on Victory Day in 2014 under the Soviet flag

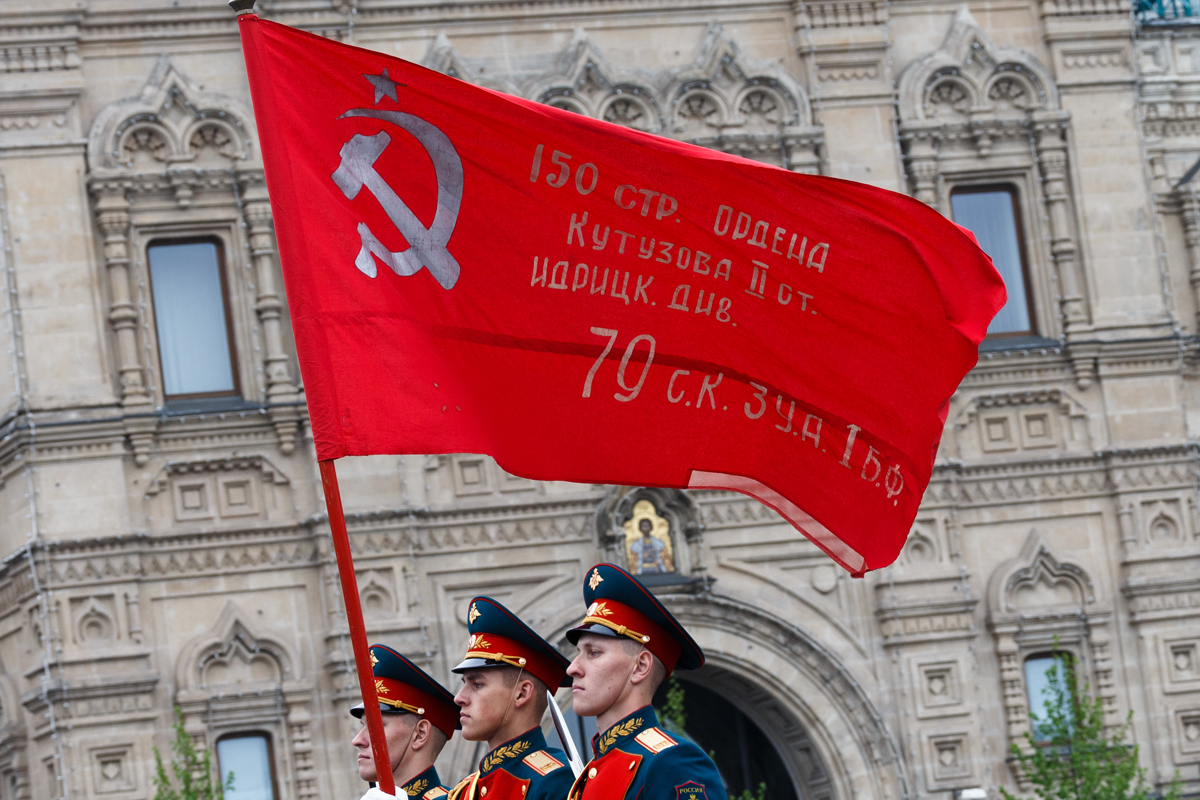
During the 2019 Moscow Victory Day Parade

=== In Russia ===
During the Soviet Union's existence, 9 May was celebrated throughout it and in the Eastern Bloc. Though the holiday was introduced in many Soviet republics between 1946 and 1950, it became a non-working day only in the Ukrainian SSR in 1963 and the Russian SFSR in 1965. In the Russian SFSR, a weekday off (usually a Monday) was given if 9 May fell on a Saturday or Sunday.

The celebration of Victory Day continued during subsequent years. The war became a topic of great importance in cinema, literature, history lessons at school, the mass media, and the arts. The ritual of the celebration gradually obtained a distinctive character with a number of similar elements: ceremonial meetings, speeches, lectures, receptions and fireworks.

In Russia during the 1990s, the 9 May holiday was not celebrated with large Soviet-style mass demonstrations due to the policies of successive Russian governments. Following Vladimir Putin's rise to power, the Russian government began promoting the prestige of the governing regime and history, and national holidays and commemorations became a source of national self-esteem. Victory Day in Russia has become a celebration in which popular culture plays a central role. The 60th and 70th anniversaries of Victory Day in Russia (2005 and 2015) became the largest popular holidays since the collapse of the Soviet Union.

In 1995, as the world celebrated the 50th anniversary of the end of the war, many world leaders converged on Moscow to attend the city's first state sponsored ceremonies since the end of the Soviet Union. In 2015 around 30 leaders, including those of China and India, attended the 2015 celebration, while Western leaders boycotted the ceremonies because of the Russian military intervention in Ukraine that started in 2014. The 2020 edition of the parade, marking the 75th anniversary of the victory over Nazi Germany, was postponed due to the COVID-19 pandemic.

Russophone populations in many countries celebrate the holiday regardless of its local status, organize public gatherings and even parades on this day. Some multilanguage broadcasting television networks translate the "Victory speech" of the Russian president and the parade on Red Square for telecasts for viewers all over the globe, making the parade one of the world's most watched events of the year. RT also broadcasts the parade featuring live commentary, and also airs yet another highlight of the day – the Minute of Silence at 6:55 pm MST, a tradition dating back to 1965.

Because of massive losses among both military and civilians during World War II, Victory Day is one of the most important and emotional dates in Russia.

=== Other countries currently celebrating 9 May ===
Belarusian President Alexander Lukashenko delivering a speech on Victory Day in 2019

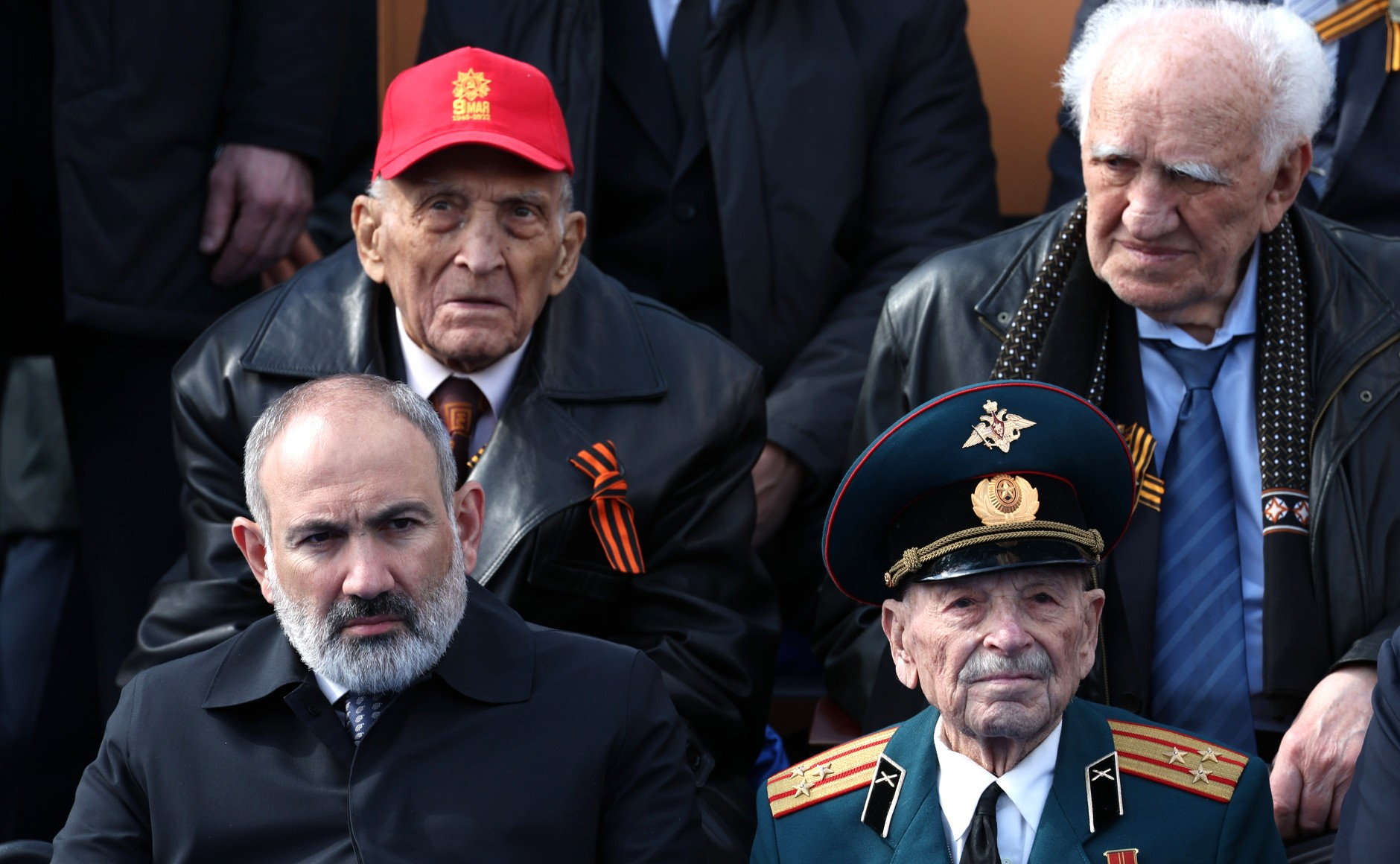
Armenian Prime Minister Nikol Pashinyan at the 2023 Moscow Victory Day Parade

- Armenia has officially recognized 9 May since its independence in 1991. It is officially known as Victory and Peace Day. The holiday was similarly celebrated there while the country was part of the Soviet Union. Shushi Liberation Day is also commemorated with the holiday.
- Azerbaijan has officially recognized 9 May since 1994. Upon its independence in 1991, the Azerbaijani Popular Front Party and later the government of Abulfaz Elchibey deliberately erased the holiday from the calendar, with veterans being subjected to a targeted anti-Russian/Soviet media campaign. Upon coming to power, Heydar Aliyev restored the holiday to the national calendar. The holiday is similarly celebrated as it was while the country was part of the Soviet Union.
- Belarus has officially recognized 9 May since its independence in 1991 and considers it a non-working day. The holiday was similarly celebrated there while the country was part of the Soviet Union. Belarus has had seven Victory Day Parades, on Independence Square and Masherov Avenue (1995, 2000, 2005, 2010, 2015, 2020 and 2025) and has had an annual ceremony on Victory Square since independence.
- Bosnia and Herzegovina has officially recognized 9 May since its independence. However, it is not a working day only in Republic of Srpska.
- Croatia has officially recognized 9 May as Victory Day over Fascism as a memorial day since 2019, which is a legally-recognised day, but is not a public holiday.
- (Georgia (country)) Georgia has officially recognized 9 May since its independence in 1991. The holiday was similarly celebrated there while the country was part of the Soviet Union. It is particularly celebrated in this way with the Russian community in the country.
- In Israel, Victory Day on 9 May has historically been celebrated as an unofficial national remembrance day. However, in 2017, Victory in Europe Day was upgraded to the status of an official national holiday day of commemoration by the Knesset, with schools and businesses operating as usual. As a result of immigration of many Red Army veterans, Israel now hosts the largest and most extensive Victory Day celebrations outside the former Soviet Union. Traditions and customs of Victory Day are the same as in Russia, with marches of Immortal Regiments held in cities with large populations of Red Army veterans and their descendants.
- Kazakhstan has officially recognized 9 May since its independence in 1991 as a national holiday. The holiday is sometimes celebrated in connection with the Defender of the Fatherland Day holiday on 7 May. From 1947 the holiday was similarly celebrated there while the country was part of the Soviet Union.
- Kyrgyzstan has officially recognised 9 May since its independence in 1991. The holiday was similarly celebrated there while the country was part of the Soviet Union.
- Mongolia had officially recognized 9 May during its existence as a satellite state of the Soviet Union. The holiday continues to be celebrated unofficially throughout the country.
- Montenegro officially recognised 9 May as Victory Day over Fascism as an official holiday.
- Serbia celebrates 9 May as Victory Day over Fascism but it is a working holiday. Still many people gather to mark the anniversary with the war veterans, including the President, Minister of Defense and the highest officers of the Serbian Armed Forces.
- Tajikistan has officially recognised 9 May since its independence following the dissolution of the Soviet Union. The holiday was similarly celebrated there while the country was part of the Soviet Union.
- Turkmenistan has officially recognised 9 May since its independence in 1991. It officially known as the Day of Remembrance of National Heroes of Turkmenistan in the 1941–1945 World War. It was established by a special decree of President of Turkmenistan Saparmurat Niyazov in 2000. The holiday was similarly celebrated there while the country was part of the Soviet Union. Since 2018, it has not been a public holiday. Various events are conducted at famous parks such as Altyn Asyr Park and the National Cultural Centre's Palace of Mukams. In recent years, Turkmen prisoners have received pardons from the President of Turkmenistan on Victory Day.
- Uzbekistan has officially recognised 9 May from 2 March 1999, where the holiday was introduced as the "Day of Remembrance and Honour" (Xotira va Qadirlash Kuni). It is the only country in the Commonwealth of Independent States to not officially recognize the 9 May holiday as Victory Day. Under President Islam Karimov, the holiday was toned down, with many veterans being told not to wear their Soviet-era decorations or uniforms on the holiday. Since Karimov's death in 2016, the holiday has been celebrated there similarly to how it was celebrated while the country was part of the Soviet Union.

=== Countries formerly celebrating 9 May ===
- Bulgaria officially recognized 9 May during its existence as a satellite state of the Soviet Union. Since 1989, all official celebrations of 9 May have been cancelled. As in other EU countries, Victory Day in Bulgaria is 8 May, whereas 9 May is Europe Day. However, many still gather unofficially to celebrate Victory Day on 9 May. Flowers are generally laid at the Monument to the Soviet Army in Sofia.
- Moldova officially recognized 9 May as a public holiday from its independence in 1991 to 2023. From 1951 to 1991, the holiday had also been celebrated during the country's rule by the Soviet Union as the Moldavian SSR. It is now officially known as the "Victory Day and Commemoration of the Fallen Heroes for the Independence of the Fatherland" (Romanian: Ziua Victoriei și a Comemorării Eroilor Căzuți pentru Independența Patriei). Victory Day was a major national holiday, particularly due to Moldova's Russian community and also due to the Party of Socialists of the Republic of Moldova (PSRM) and its state-sponsored Victory Day rallies of 2017 on the Great National Assembly Square at Chișinău. Wreath-laying ceremonies were commonly held at the Eternity Memorial Complex of Chișinău during the day.
- Poland officially recognised 9 May as a state holiday, where it was known as Narodowe Święto Zwycięstwa i Wolności ("National Victory and Freedom Day") from 1945 until 2015. Until 1950 it was also a day free from work. The holiday served both as a celebration of victory against Nazi Germany as well as to highlight the union between the Polish People's Republic and the USSR. It was a key celebration that was observed with parades and major events throughout the entire country. Since the fall of the Eastern Bloc, the holiday had become controversial in Poland. Since 24 April 2015, Poland officially recognised Narodowy Dzień Zwycięstwa ("National Victory Day") on 8 May (like Victory in Europe Day) in place of the previous holiday.
- Romania officially recognized Victory Day as a public holiday during the communist era. Since Romania's 1877 independence day from the Ottoman Empire also coincides with Victory Day on 9 May, the holiday was made a double celebration, especially under Nicolae Ceaușescu who sought to portray communism in Romania as a continuation of Romania's independence struggles from previous centuries. Victory Day in Romania is now celebrated on 8 May, whereas 9 May is celebrated as Europe Day. However, some Russophiles, Eurosceptics and leftists gather at informal meetings to celebrate Victory Day on 9 May. Thus, it may mark a triple celebration in the country.
- Ukraine officially recognised 9 May from its independence in 1991 until 2013, where it was a non-working day. If it fell on a weekend the following Monday was non-working. (Note: In 2010, Lviv Oblast started to not recognize Victory Day, but rather recognizing the day as a memorial to all wartime victims of both the Soviet and Nazi regimes, as well as all of those caught in between. Starting in 2011, 8 and 9 May were celebrated as Days of Remembrance of the Victims of World War II.) The holiday was similarly celebrated there while the country was part of the Soviet Union. According to opinion polling by Kyiv International Institute of Sociology, in 2010 almost 60% of Ukrainians considered Victory Day one of the biggest holidays of Ukraine. In 2015, Ukraine started to officially celebrate Victory Day over Nazism in World War II on 9 May, per a decree of parliament (the Verkhovna Rada). Additionally the term "Great Patriotic War" as a reference was replaced with "World War II" in all Ukrainian legislation. Since 15 May 2015, Communist and Nazi symbols are prohibited in Ukraine. Before 15 May 2015, Ukraine held military parades in the capital on Khreshchatyk in 1995, 2001, 2010, and 2011, and 2013. On May 8, 2023, Ukrainian President Volodymyr Zelenskyy signed a decree according to which Ukraine would celebrate Europe Day on May 9, and submitted to the Verkhovna Rada a bill establishing May 8, the Day of Remembrance and Victory over Nazism in World War II 1939 – 1945, as a day off instead of Victory Day over Nazism in World War II on May 9. On May 29, 2023, the Verkhovna Rada made the Day of Remembrance and Victory over Nazism in World War II 1939 – 1945 on May 8 as a public holiday, canceling the Victory Day over Nazism in World War II on May 9. In 2022, following the Russian invasion of Ukraine, only 13% of Ukrainians were ready to celebrate May 9. According to a study conducted by the Kyiv International Institute of Sociology in February 2024, 11% of Ukrainians celebrate Victory Day as the most popular holiday, while Christmas is 70%, Easter is 68% and New Year is 47%. Sociologists note that in 2010, Victory Day on May 9 was one of the most important holidays, as 58% of Ukrainians thought so. However, already in 2021, only 30% of Ukrainians considered it an important holiday. The decline in the popularity of Victory Day in Ukraine is explained by the fact that this day is very actively celebrated in Russia as a militaristic holiday.

=== Unrecognized states celebrating Victory Day ===
- Abkhazia has officially recognised 9 May since its declaration of independence in 1990. From 1951 the holiday was similarly celebrated there while the country was part of the Soviet Union.
- South Ossetia has officially recognised 9 May since its declaration of independence in 1990. From 1951 the holiday was similarly celebrated there while the country was part of the Soviet Union.
- Transnistria has officially recognised 9 May since its declaration of independence in 1990. From 1951 the holiday was similarly celebrated there while the polity was part of the Soviet Union.

=== Former states ===
- From 1948 to 1993, the communist-dominated Czechoslovak Socialist Republic celebrated the holiday on 9 May in concert with the Soviet Union. Then, it was mainly celebrated with a military parade of the Czechoslovak People's Army (ČSLA) on Letná every five years to mark the end of World War II and the anniversary of the Prague uprising (the first one took place in 1951 while the last of these parades took place in 1985). Since the Dissolution of Czechoslovakia in 1993, Czech Republic has officially recognized 8 May as Liberation Day (Den osvobození). In recent years the Prague uprising and liberation of Plzeň by American troops have been commemorated on 5 May.
- (East Germany) The German Democratic Republic recognized Tag der Befreiung (Day of liberation) on 8 May, it was celebrated as a public holiday from 1950 to 1966, and on the 40th anniversary in 1985. Only in 1975 was the official holiday on 9 May instead and that year called Tag des Sieges (Victory Day). In Federal Republic of Germany, events are held on 8 May to commemorate those who fought against Nazism and died in World War II. Also, on 8 May, the German state of Mecklenburg-Vorpommern since 2002 has recognised a commemorative day Tag der Befreiung vom Nationalsozialismus und der Beendigung des 2. Weltkrieges (Day of Liberation from National Socialism, and the End of the Second World War).
- Soviet Union celebrated 9 May since 1945, with the day becoming a public holiday since 1965 in some Soviet Republics.
- Yugoslavia officially recognised 9 May from 1965 to its disestablishment after the Yugoslav Wars. The first victory parade was held on Bulevar revolucije in the presence of Marshal Josip Broz Tito in 1965 and was held every 5 years since (save for 1980) until the final parade in 1985.

=== Former unrecognized states ===
- The Republic of Artsakh had officially recognised 9 May since its declaration of independence in 1991. From 1951 the holiday was similarly celebrated there while the country was part of the Soviet Union. It coincided with the country's Liberation Day, celebrating the Armenian victory in the Capture of Shushi.

=== Holiday traditions ===
==== Victory Day Parades ====
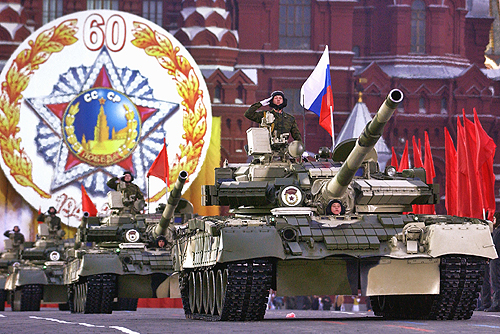
The 2005 Victory Day parade on Moscow's Red Square

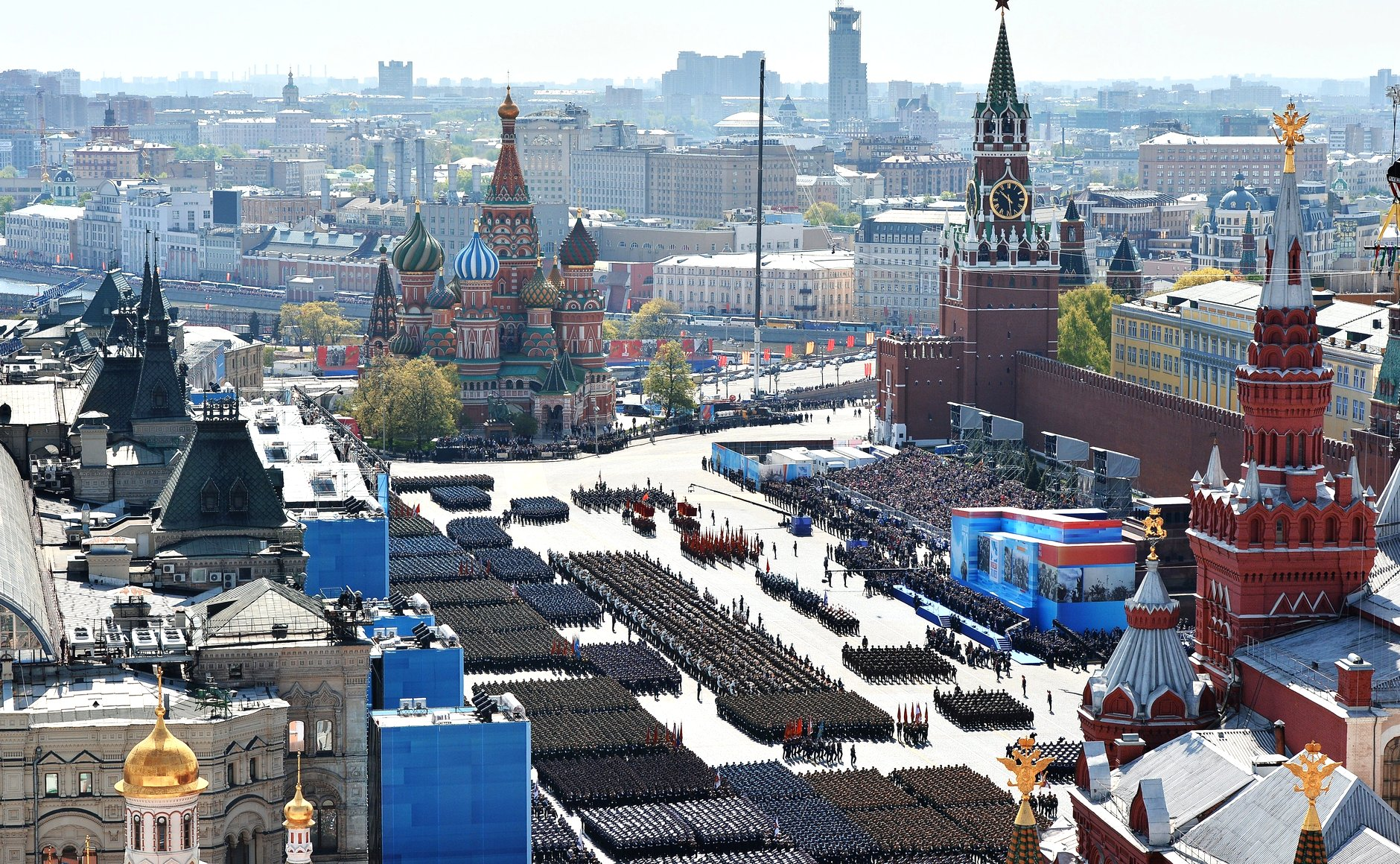
2015 Victory Day parade on Moscow's Red Square

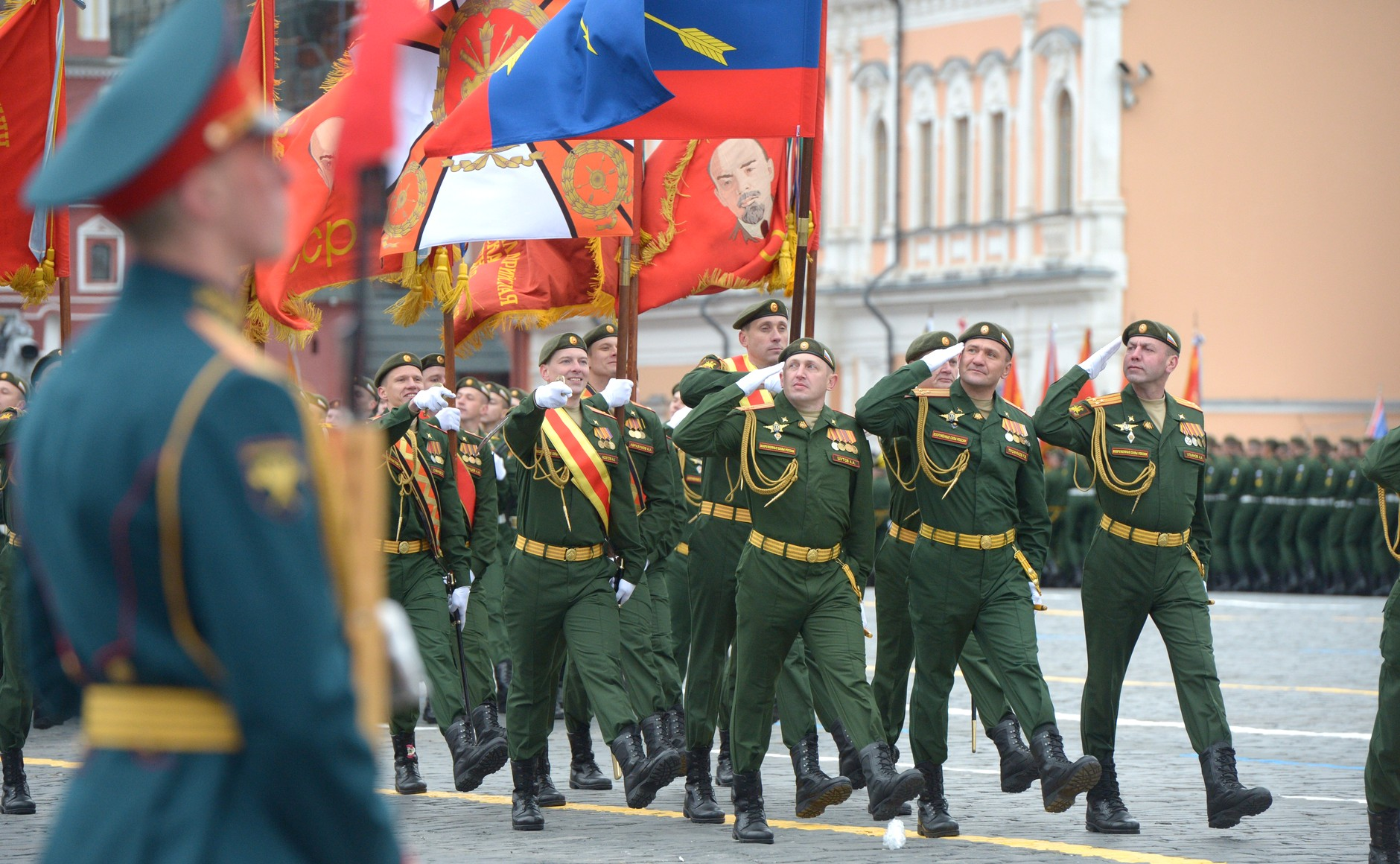
2021 Moscow Victory Day Parade. Military parades and Soviet military symbolism play an important role in the 9 May celebrations across Russia.

Victory Day Parades are military parades that are held on 9 May, particularly in various post-soviet nations such as Russia, Kazakhstan, Belarus, and until 2015, Ukraine. Outside of the former Soviet Union, military victory parades have also been held in Serbia, Poland and the Czech Republic. The first victory day parade on Red Square took place with the participation of the Red Army and a small detachment from the First Polish Army on 24 June 1945. After a 20-year hiatus, the parade was held again and became a regular tradition among Eastern Bloc countries and Soviet allies. Countries that had this tradition included Yugoslavia and Czechoslovakia, both of which had their last parades in 1985. After the fall of the Soviet Union, they quickly fell out of style in Europe and soon became a practice among post-Soviet nations, many of which have large Russian populations. In 1995, Russia, Kazakhstan, Belarus, and Ukraine held parades for the first time since 1991.

==== Mass processions ====
In Belarus on non-jubilee years, a procession is held from October Square, which ends with the laying of wreaths on Victory Square. In 2015, a parade of young people, cadets of military lyceums, young athletes took place on Bishkek's Ala-Too Square, attended by President Almazbek Atambayev and Prime Minister Temir Sariev. The Immortal Regiment (Russian: Бессмертный полк; Bessmertniy Polk) is a massive civil event staged in major cities in Russia and around the world every 9 May. Since it was introduced in 2012, it has been conducted in cities such as Moscow, Washington D.C., Dushanbe, Berlin, and Yekaterinburg. Participants carry pictures of relatives or family members who served during the Second World War. The front line of the procession carries a banner with the words Bessmertniy Polk written on it. Up to 12 million Russians have participated in the march nationwide in recent years. Since 2015, the President Vladimir Putin and senior Russian officials have participated in the procession in Moscow. It has come under criticism by those who charge that participants are carrying photographs and discarding them after the event. (Note: Critics of the Immortal Regiment have accused the government of co-opting the tradition to promote patriotism and loyalty rather than remember the country's war dead. The event remains popular nonetheless, as many Russian families were affected by the war.)

==== Gatherings at monuments ====
Members of government usually take part in a wreath-laying ceremony at their national war memorial, usually dedicated to the specific war victory. Wreaths are often laid at memorials such as the Tomb of the Unknown Soldier (Moscow), the Monument to the Unknown Sailor (Odesa), and the Monument to Hazi Aslanov (Baku). Although Latvia does not officially recognize 9 May, most of the large Russian community informally celebrates the holiday, with trips to the Victory Memorial to Soviet Army being common in Riga, with some diplomats (ambassadors of Russia, Kazakhstan, and Belarus) as well as some politicians (Nils Ušakovs, Alfrēds Rubiks) also taking part. On 20 April 2023 the Latvian Parliament passed a bill to ban all public celebrations on May 9, the only exception being Europe Day. The law was meant to stop the "glorification of warfare and to stem the propagandist distortions of World War II history often implicit in Victory Day celebrations."

==== Religious commemorations ====
In the Easter message of 1945, the Patriarch Alexy I of Moscow wrote:

The Easter joy of the Resurrection of Christ is now combined with the bright hope of an imminent victory of truth and light over the untruth and darkness of German fascism, which before our eyes is crushed by the combined force of our valiant troops and the troops of our allies. The dark forces of fascism were not able to resist the light and power of Christ, and God's omnipotence appeared over the imaginary power of man.

Every 26 April (Old Style, O.S.; 9 May, New Style or N.S.), the Russian Orthodox Church commemorates the dead, being the only special remembrance day for the dead with a fixed date. After the liturgy, a memorial service for the fallen soldiers is served in all churches and monasteries of the Orthodox Church. The annual commemoration on Victory Day "of the soldiers who for faith, the Fatherland and the people laid down their lives and all those who died in the Great Patriotic War of 1941–1945" was established by the Bishops' Council of the Russian Orthodox Church in 1994. On the eve of the 65th anniversary in 2010, Patriarch Kirill of Moscow gave his blessing for all the churches of the Russian Orthodox Church to perform a "prayer service in memory of the deliverance of our people from a terrible, mortal enemy, from a danger that our Fatherland has not known in all history". The patriarch composed a special prayer for this rite, taking as a basis the prayer of Philaret Drozdov, written in honor of the victory of the Imperial Russian Army over the French Grande Armee during the Napoleonic Wars. The completion of the Main Cathedral of the Russian Armed Forces was timed to Victory Day in 2020.

==== Other events ====
Traditions such as the Victory Relay Race are held on jubilee anniversaries. In 2013, Turkmenistan conducted live-fire military exercises "Galkan-2013" (Shield-2013) dedicated to the 68th anniversary of the Victory, observed by President Gurbanguly Berdymukhamedov at the Kelyata Training Center of the Ministry of Defence of Turkmenistan in the Bäherden District of the Ahal Region. In 2016, Moldovan Defence Minister Anatol Șalaru attended a display of vehicles from the Moldovan National Army and the United States Army in the central park of Chișinău. In April 2020, an official in the Western Military District of Russia announced that an air show would be held at Kubinka air base in Victory Day.

On Victory Day, many books on topics such as the war such as Panfilov's Twenty-Eight Guardsmen are published. On the eve of the diamond jubilee, President Vladimir Putin, at the request of Chancellor Sebastian Kurz, gave a live address broadcast Austrian TV channel ORF.

== Soviet and post-Soviet symbols associated with Victory Day ==
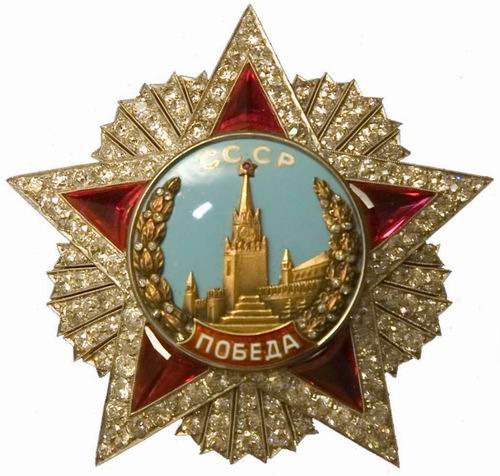
Soviet Order of Victory

=== Banner of Victory ===
The Victory Banner refers to the Soviet military banner raised by the Soviet soldiers on the Reichstag building in Berlin on 1 May 1945. Made during the Battle of Berlin by soldiers who created it while under battlefield conditions, it has historically been the official symbol of the Victory of the Soviet people against Nazi Germany. Being the 5th banner to be created, it was the only army flag that was prepared to be raised in Berlin to survive the battle. The Cyrillic inscription on the banner reads: "150th Rifle, Order of Kutuzov 2nd class, Idritsa Division, 79th Rifle Corps, 3rd Shock Army, 1st Belorussian Front", representing the unit that soldiers who raised the banner were from. On 9 May, a specially made replica of the Victory Banner is carried by a color guard of the 154th Preobrazhensky Independent Commandant's Regiment through Red Square. The Victory Banner was brought to Kyiv from Moscow in October 2004 to take part in the parade in honor of the 60th Anniversary of the Liberation of Ukraine. In 2015, the banner was brought to Astana to participate in the Defender of the Fatherland Day parade on 7 May.

=== Saint George's Ribbon ===
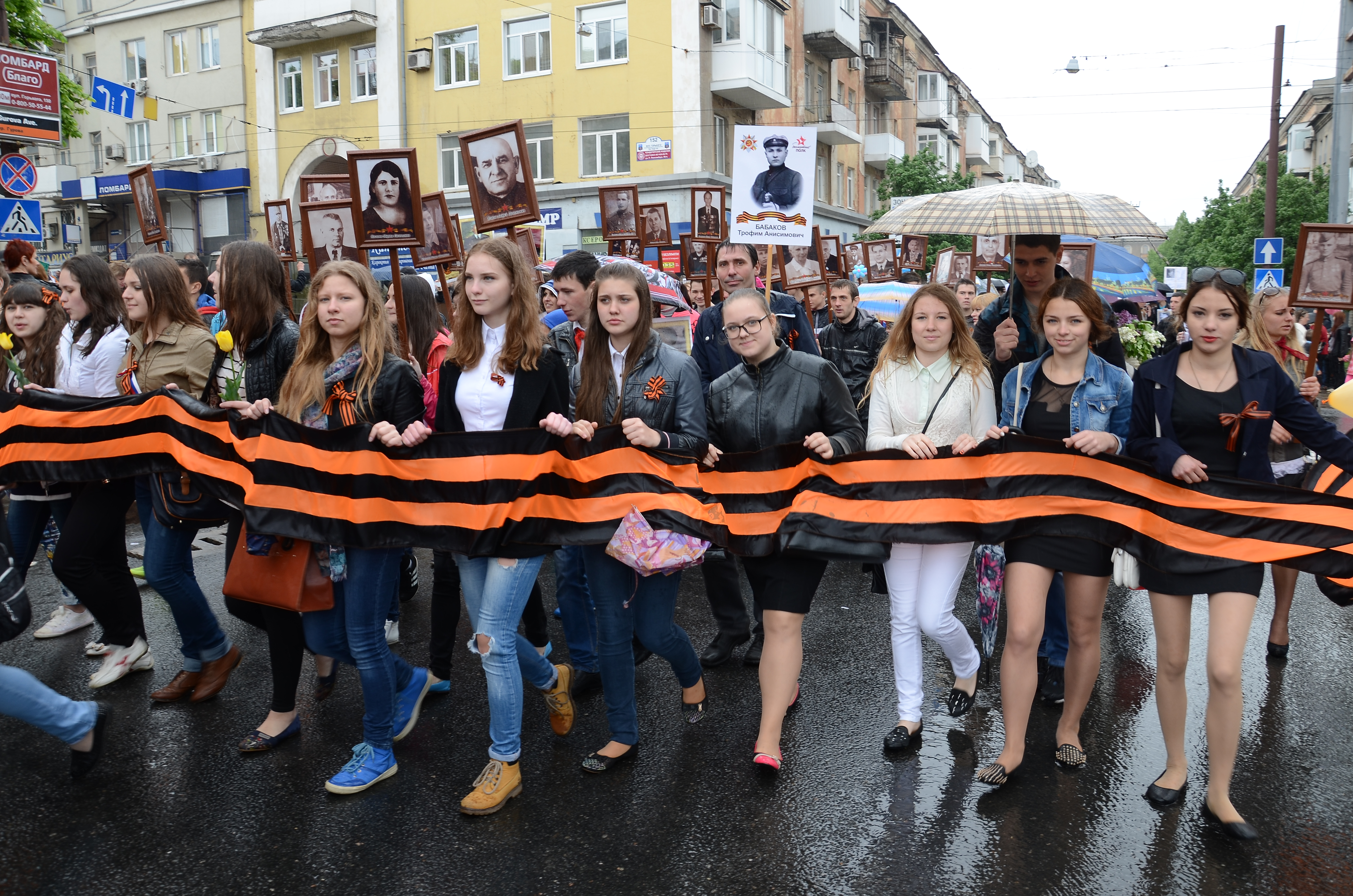
Residents of Donetsk carry the ribbon and portraits of ancestors who fought in World War II, 9 May 2015

The Ribbon of Saint George is a military symbol that dates back to the era of the Russian Empire. It consists of a black and orange bicolour pattern, with three black and two orange stripes. In the early 21st century, it became an awareness ribbon to commemorate the veterans of the war, being recognized as a patriotic symbol. In countries such as Ukraine and the Baltic states, it has been associated recently with Russophilia and Russian irredentism. It has become especially associated with Russian support for the 2022 Russian invasion of Ukraine. In Ukraine the government chose to replace it with the remembrance poppy which is associated with the Remembrance Day commemorations in the United Kingdom and the British Commonwealth.

On 5 May 2014, the Belarusian Republican Youth Union encouraged activists not to use the ribbon due to the situation in Ukraine. In time for Victory Day 2015, the ribbon's colors were replaced there by the red, green and white from the Flag of Belarus.

=== Awards ===
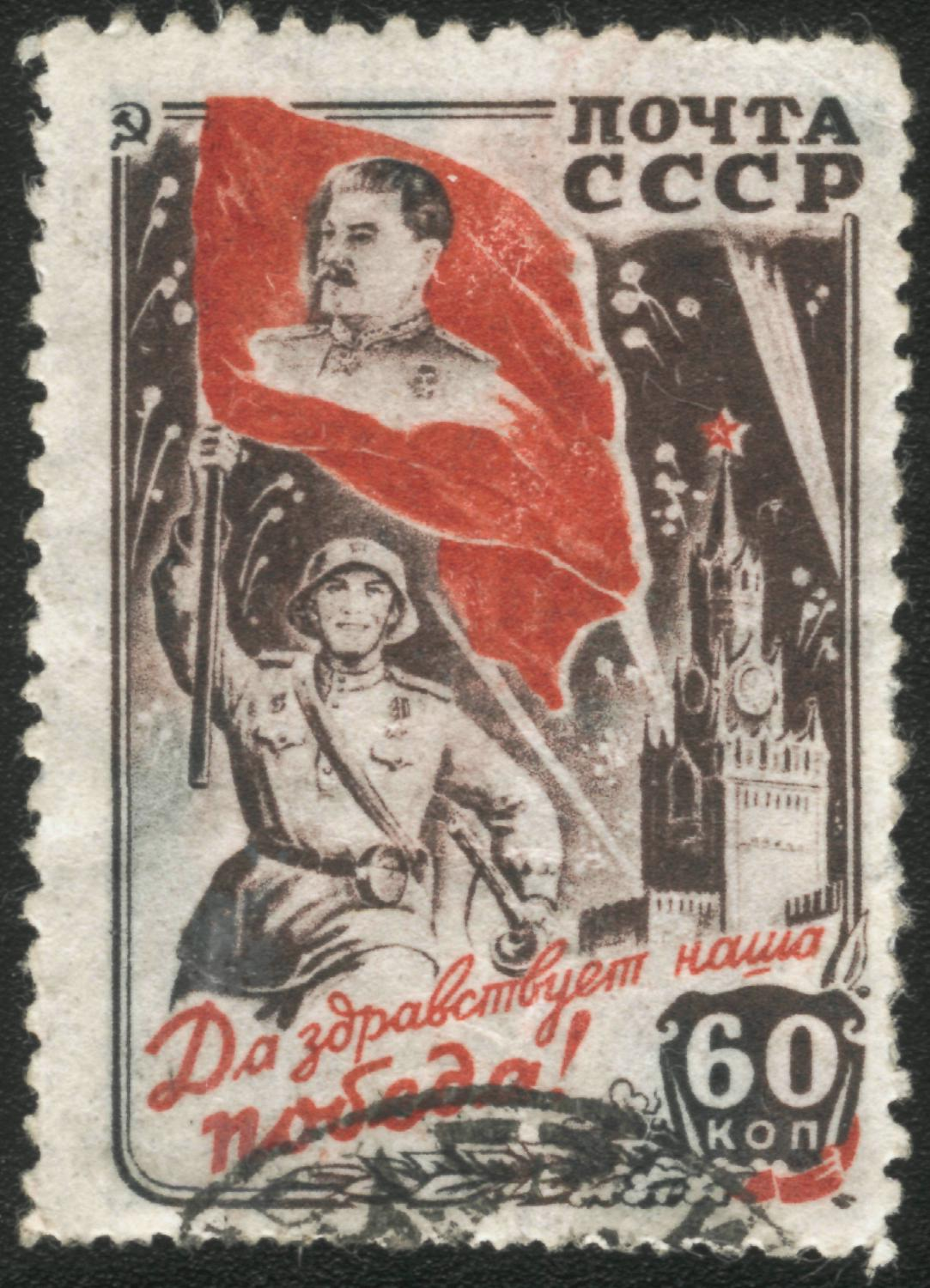
1945 Soviet stamp; the Russian inscription below the Soviet soldier waving the red flag with Joseph Stalin on it, says, "Long live our victory!"

==== Soviet Union ====
Order of Victory

Medal For the Victory Over Germany in the Great Patriotic War 1941–1945	Medal For the Victory Over Germany in the Great Patriotic War 1941–1945
Medal For the Capture of Berlin	Medal For the Capture of Berlin
Medal For the Twentieth Anniversary of the Victory Over Germany in the Great Patriotic War 1941–1945	Jubilee Medal "Twenty Years of Victory in the Great Patriotic War 1941–1945"
Medal for the 30th Anniversary of the Victory in the Great Patriotic War of 1941–1945	Jubilee Medal "Thirty Years of Victory in the Great Patriotic War 1941–1945"
Medal for the 40th Anniversary of the Victory in the Great Patriotic War of 1941–1945	Jubilee Medal "Forty Years of Victory in the Great Patriotic War 1941–1945"

==== Russia ====
Медаль «50 лет Победы в Великой Отечественной войне 1941–1945 гг.»	Medal for the 50th Anniversary of the Victory in the Great Patriotic War of 1941–1945
Медаль 60 лет Победы в Великой Отечественной войне 1941–1945 гг.	Medal for the 60th Anniversary of the Victory in the Great Patriotic War of 1941–1945
Медаль 65 лет Победы в Великой Отечественной войне 1941–1945 гг.	Medal for the 65th Anniversary of the Victory in the Great Patriotic War of 1941–1945
Медаль 70 лет Победы в Великой Отечественной войне 1941–1945 гг.	Medal for the 70th Anniversary of the Victory in the Great Patriotic War of 1941–1945
Медаль 75 лет Победы в Великой Отечественной войне 1941–1945 гг.	Medal for the 75th Anniversary of the Victory in the Great Patriotic War of 1941–1945

==== Ukraine ====
Медаль 60 лет Победы в Великой Отечественной войне 1941–1945 гг.	Medal for the 60th Anniversary of the Victory in the Great Patriotic War of 1941–1945
Medal for the 70th Anniversary of the Victory over Nazism	Medal for the 70th Anniversary of the Victory over Nazism
Order of Bohdan Khmelnytsky	Order of Bohdan Khmelnytsky

==== Azerbaijan ====
Medal for the 75th Anniversary of the Victory in the Great Patriotic War of 1941–1945

==== Kazakhstan ====
Медаль 60 лет Победы в Великой Отечественной войне 1941–1945 гг. (Казахстан)	Medal for the 60th Anniversary of the Victory in the Great Patriotic War of 1941–1945
Медаль 70 лет Победы в Великой Отечественной войне 1941–1945 гг.	Medal for the 70th Anniversary of the Victory in the Great Patriotic War of 1941–1945

==== Turkmenistan ====
- Jubilee Medal "60 Years of the Victory in the Great Patriotic War 1941–1945"
- Jubilee Medal "75 Years of the Victory in the Great Patriotic War 1941–1945"

==== Israel ====
אות הלוחם בנאצים	Fighters against Nazis Medal

== Gallery of the celebrations ==
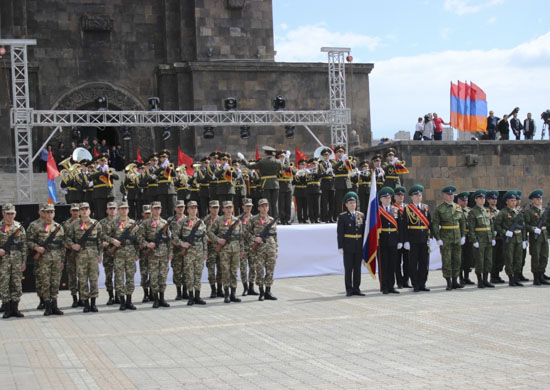
2018 celebrations at the Mother Armenia monument in Yerevan

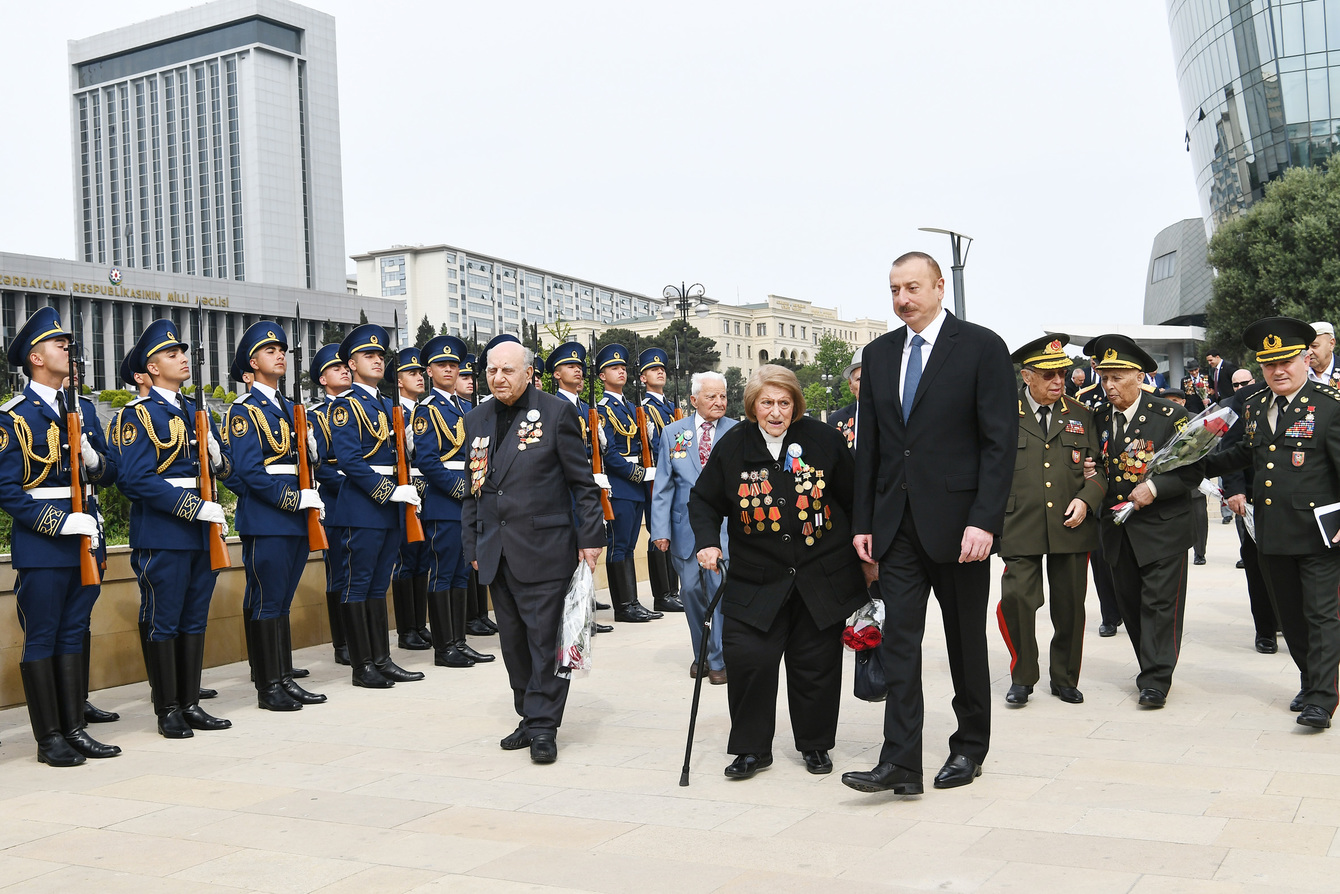
President Ilham Aliyev with war veterans in Baku in 2018

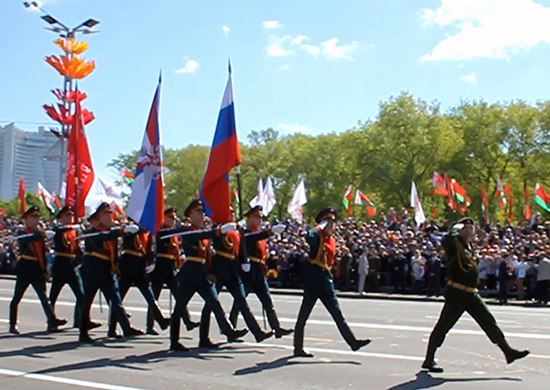
The victory parade in Minsk in 2015

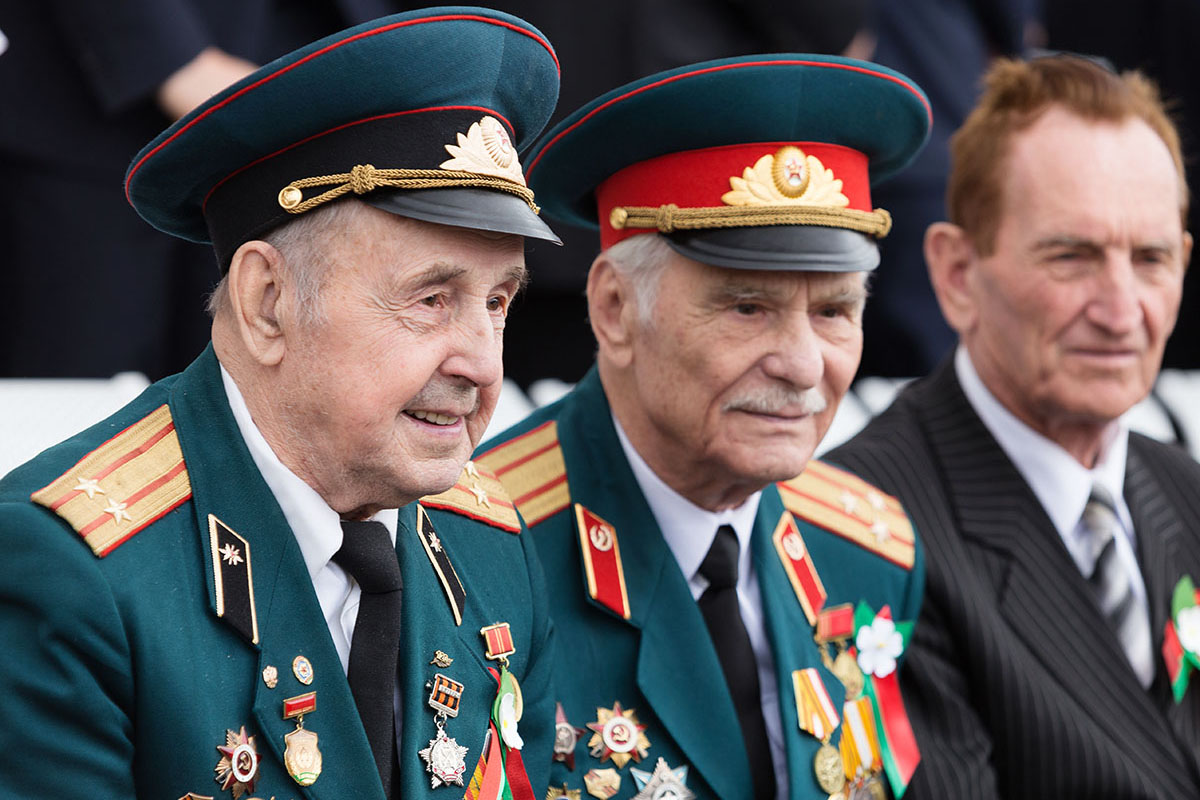
Belarusian veterans during Victory Day in 2017

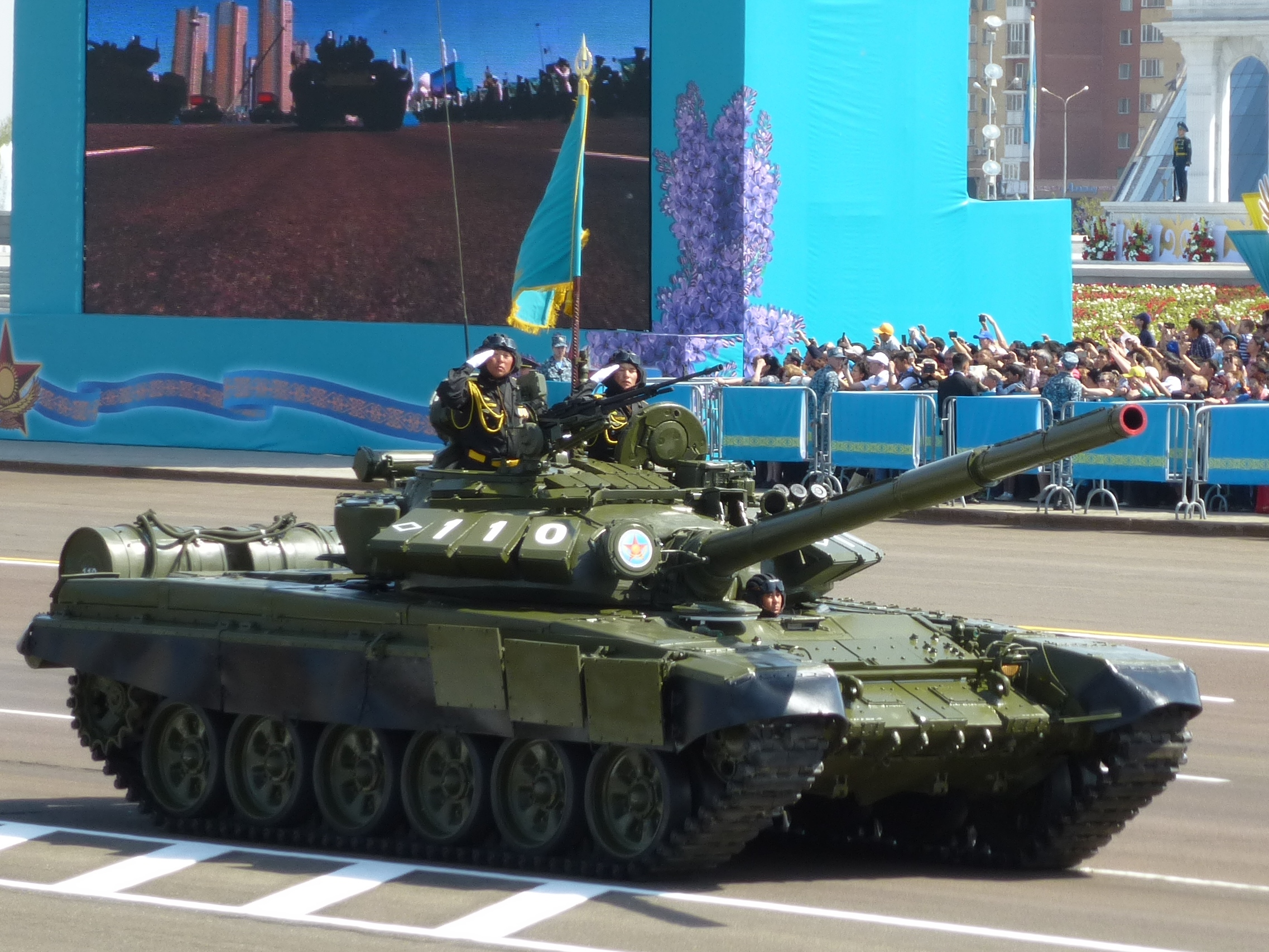
A T-72 tank during a Victory Day parade in Kazakhstan 2015

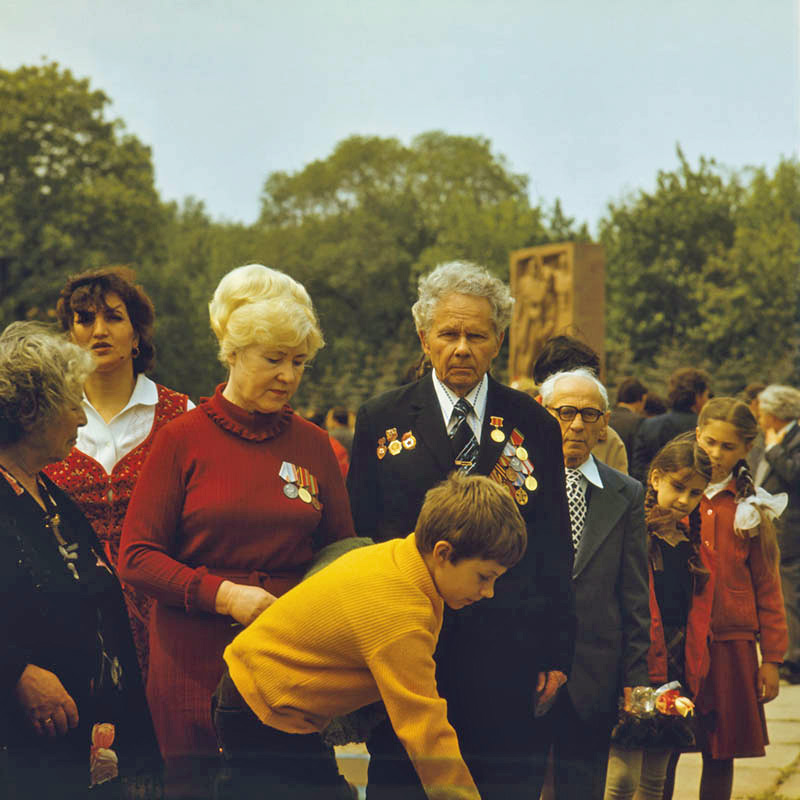
Victory Day in the Moldavian SSR in 1980

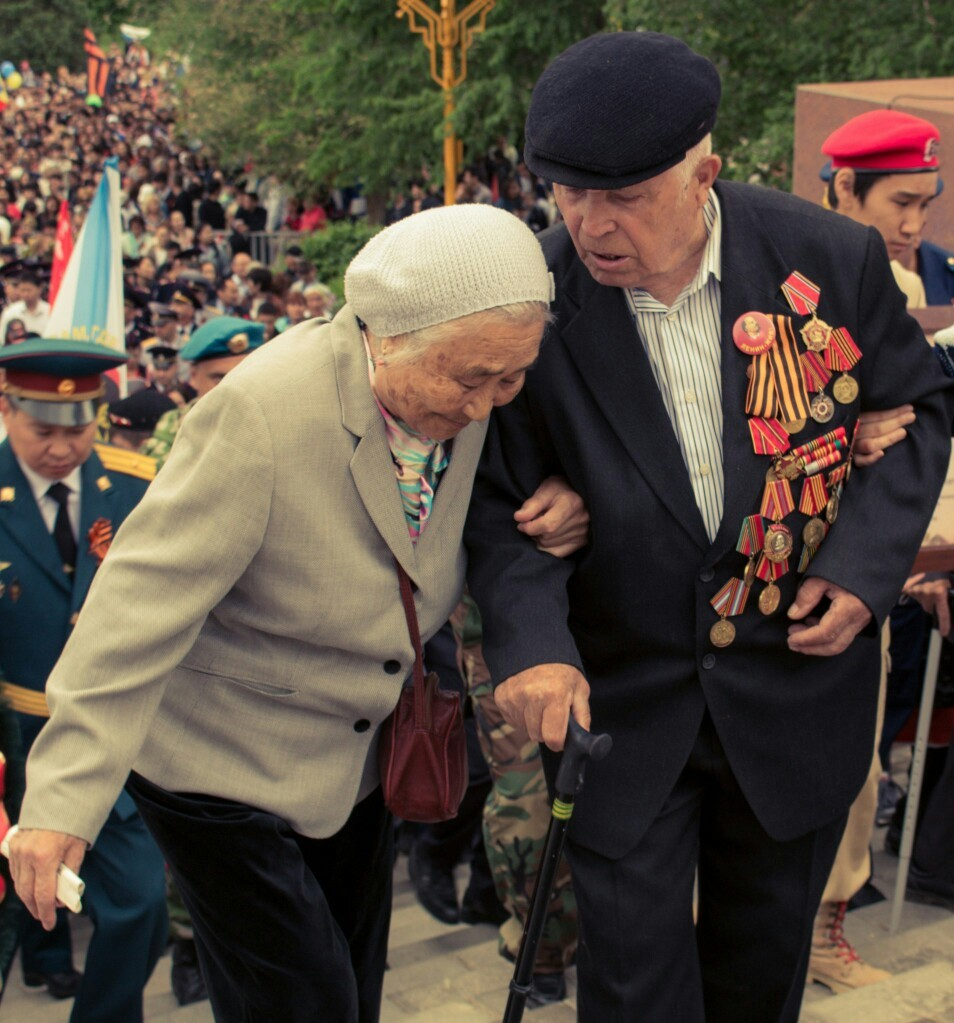
Veterans during Victory Day in Russia

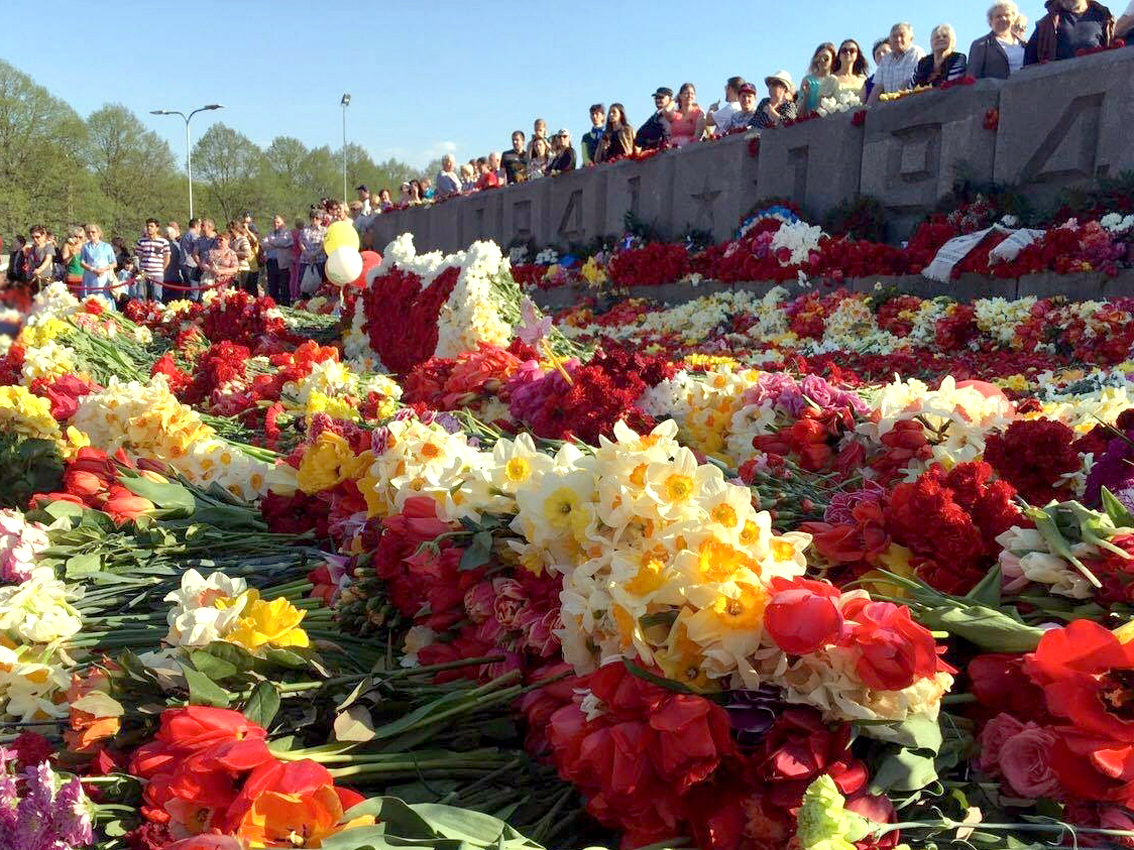
Flowers near Victory Memorial in Riga, Latvia in 2016

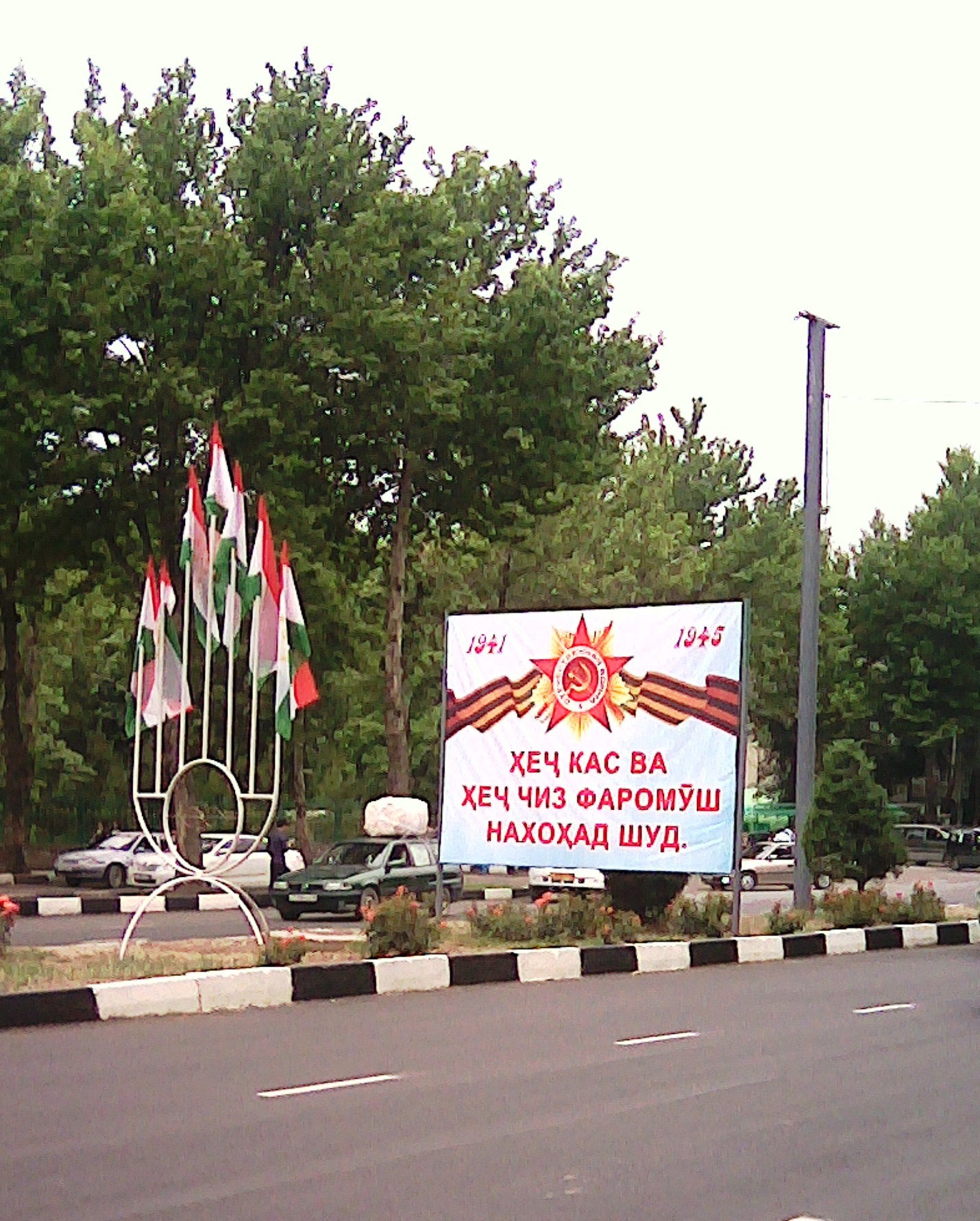
A sign on a Dushanbe Avenue for Victory Day

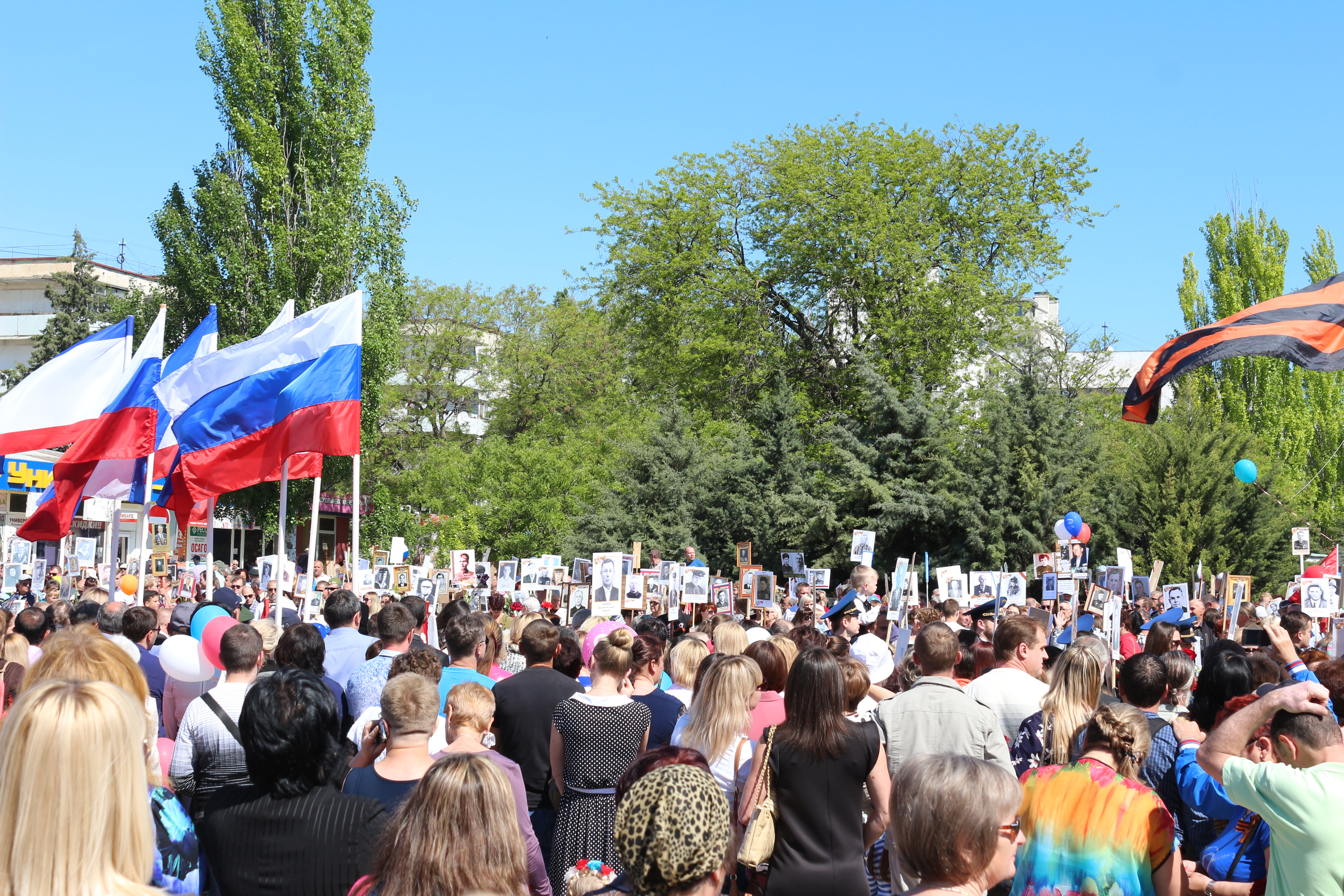
Local residents in Crimea at «Immortal regiment», carrying portraits of their ancestors and participants in World War II, 9 May 2016

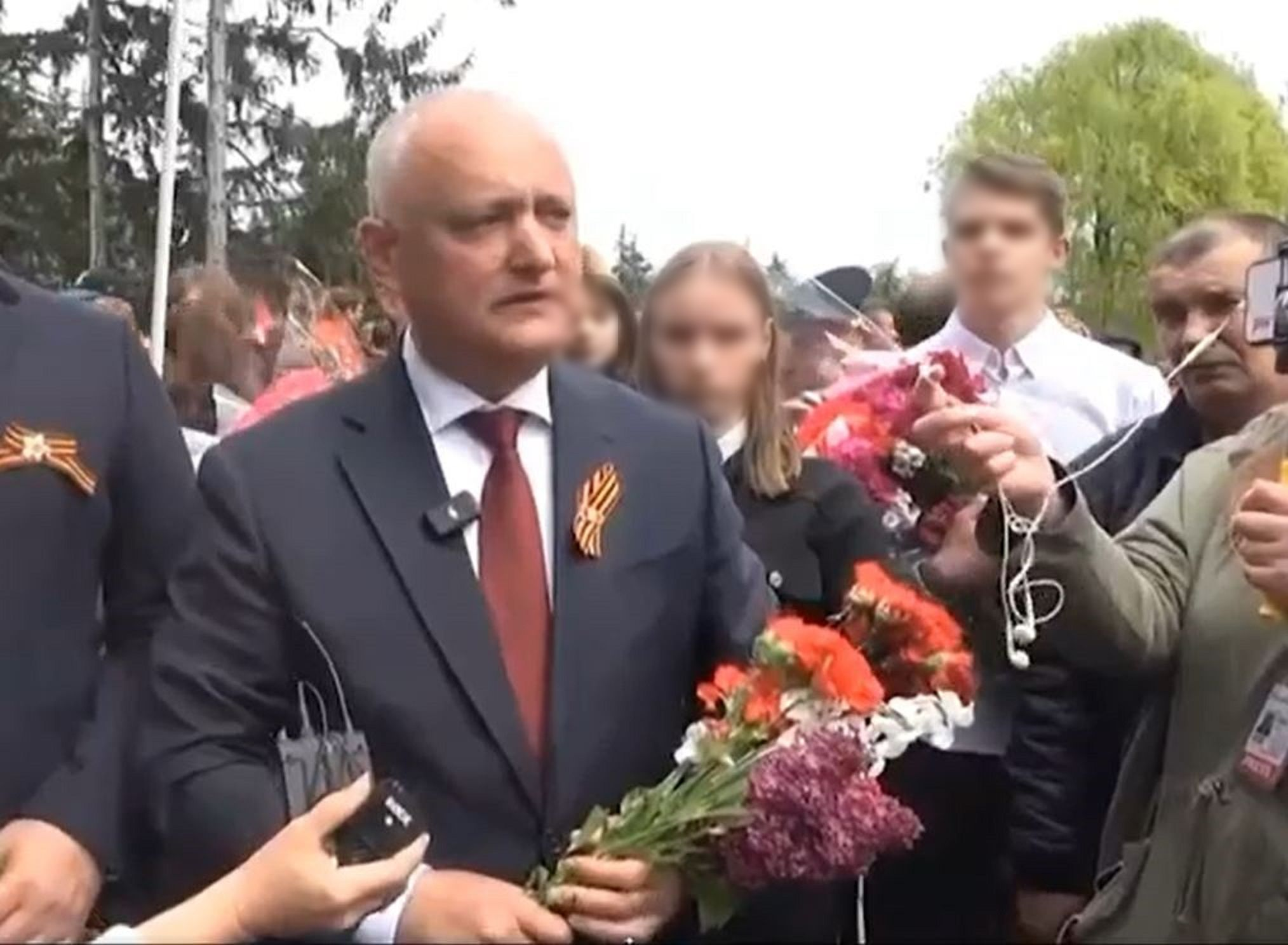
Moldovan former president Igor Dodon (wearing the Ribbon of Saint George) with members of the Șor Party at a Victory Day rally in Moldova on 9 May 2023

== See also ==
- End of World War II in Europe
- Hero city
- Immortal Regiment
- Moscow Victory Day Parade
- Pobediteli
- Pobedobesie
- Stalinobus
- Time of Remembrance and Reconciliation
- Victory Day in other countries
- Victory Day Parades
- Victory over Japan Day
