= Public holidays in Croatia =

Public holidays in Croatia are regulated by the Holidays, Memorial Days and Non-Working Days Act (Croatian: Zakon o blagdanima, spomendanima i neradnim danima).

== Holidays and non-working days ==
Date	English name	Croatian name	Notes
1 January	New Year's Day	Nova godina	
6 January	Epiphany	Sveta tri kralja	
moveable	Easter	Uskrs	
moveable	Easter Monday	Uskrsni ponedjeljak	
1 May	Labour Day	Praznik rada	
30 May	Statehood Day	Dan državnosti	Holiday from 1991 until 2001 and since 2020*
moveable	Corpus Christi	Tijelovo	
22 June	Anti-Fascist Struggle Day	Dan antifašističke borbe	
5 August	Victory and Homeland Thanksgiving Day	Dan pobjede i domovinske zahvalnosti	
15 August	Assumption Day	Velika Gospa	
1 November	All Saints' Day	Dan svih svetih	
18 November	Day of Remembrance for the Victims of the Homeland War	Dan sjećanja na žrtve Domovinskog rata	Holiday since 2020*
25 December	Christmas	Božić	
26 December	Saint Stephen's Day	Sveti Stjepan	

* In 2020 there was a change in holidays: 25 June (was Statehood Day until 2019, became Independence Day in 2020) and 8 October (was Independence Day until 2019, became Day of the Croatian Parliament in 2020) changed names and were demoted from public holidays to memorial days (working). 30 May (was Day of the Croatian Parliament until 2019, became National Day in 2020) was promoted from a memorial day to a public holiday, and 18 November (Homeland War Victims Remembrance Day) was added as a new public holiday.

Citizens of the Republic of Croatia who celebrate different religious holidays have the right not to work on those dates. Christians who celebrate Christmas, Easter and Easter Monday per the Julian calendar, Muslims on the days of Ramadan Bayram and Kurban Bayram, and Jews on the days of Rosh Hashanah and Yom Kippur.

== Memorial days ==
Date	English name	Croatian Name	Notes
9 January	Day of the Unification of Međimurje with its Parent Body Croatia	Dan sjedinjenja Međimurja s maticom zemljom Hrvatskom	
15 January	Day of the international recognition of the Republic of Croatia and Day of the peaceful reintegration of the Croatian Danube Region	Dan međunarodnoga priznanja Republike Hrvatske i Dan mirne reintegracije hrvatskog Podunavlja	
15 March	Day of the Establishment of the National Protection	Dan osnivanja Narodne zaštite	
30 April	Day of the Death of Zrinski and Frankopan	Dan pogibije Zrinskog i Frankopana	
3 May	Day of Remembrance for Children Killed and Injured in the Homeland War	Dan sjećanja na ubijenu i stradalu djecu u Domovinskom ratu	
9 May	Europe Day and Victory Day over Fascism	Dan Europe i Dan pobjede nad fašizmom	
moveable	Day of Remembrance for Croatian Victims in the Fight for Freedom and Independence	Dan spomena na hrvatske žrtve u borbi za slobodu i nezavisnost	Saturday/Sunday nearest to 15 May
5 June	Croatian Flag Day	Dan hrvatske zastave	
25 June	Independence Day	Dan neovisnosti	was a Holiday until 2020
23 August	European Day of Remembrance for Victims of Stalinism and Nazism	Europski dan sjećanja na žrtve totalitarnih i autoritarnih režima – nacizma, fašizma i komunizma	
30 August	Day of Remembrance of Missing Persons in the Homeland War	Dan sjećanja na nestale osobe u Domovinskom ratu	
25 September	Day of the Decision about the Unification of Istria, Rijeka, Zadar and the Islands with the Parent Body Croatia	Dan donošenja Odluke o sjedinjenju Istre, Rijeke, Zadra i otoka s maticom zemljom Hrvatskom	
8 October	Day of the Croatian Parliament	Dan Hrvatskoga sabora	was a Holiday until 2020

== Unofficial holidays and observances ==
- Popular carnival celebrations are held in most cities and towns in the country on Shrove Tuesday (Pokladni utorak), when customarily businesses in the public sector and hospitality industry cease work for the day earlier than usual, but the day is not officially designated as a public holiday.
- Some cities also celebrate de facto public holidays on their patron saints' feast days. For example, in Split, the day of Saint Domnius (Sveti Duje) is celebrated on May 7, while Dubrovnik marks the day of Saint Blaise (Sveti Vlaho) on 3 February; businesses usually cease work earlier than usual on these days. Most rural village parishes in Slavonia celebrate their patron saints' with a kirbaj / kirvaj festival (from German kirche weihe) when schools are usually closed for a day.
- During the second Yugoslavia, the country as a federal unit, celebrated the Day of the Republic on 29 November to commemorate the second session of AVNOJ. It is still celebrated by Yugo-nostalgists in Croatia today.
- Even though Christmas Eve (24 December) and New Year's Eve (31 December) are not public holidays, businesses customarily close earlier (as early as 2pm).

== See also ==
- Public holidays in Yugoslavia
