= Europe Day =

Annual observance by the European Union

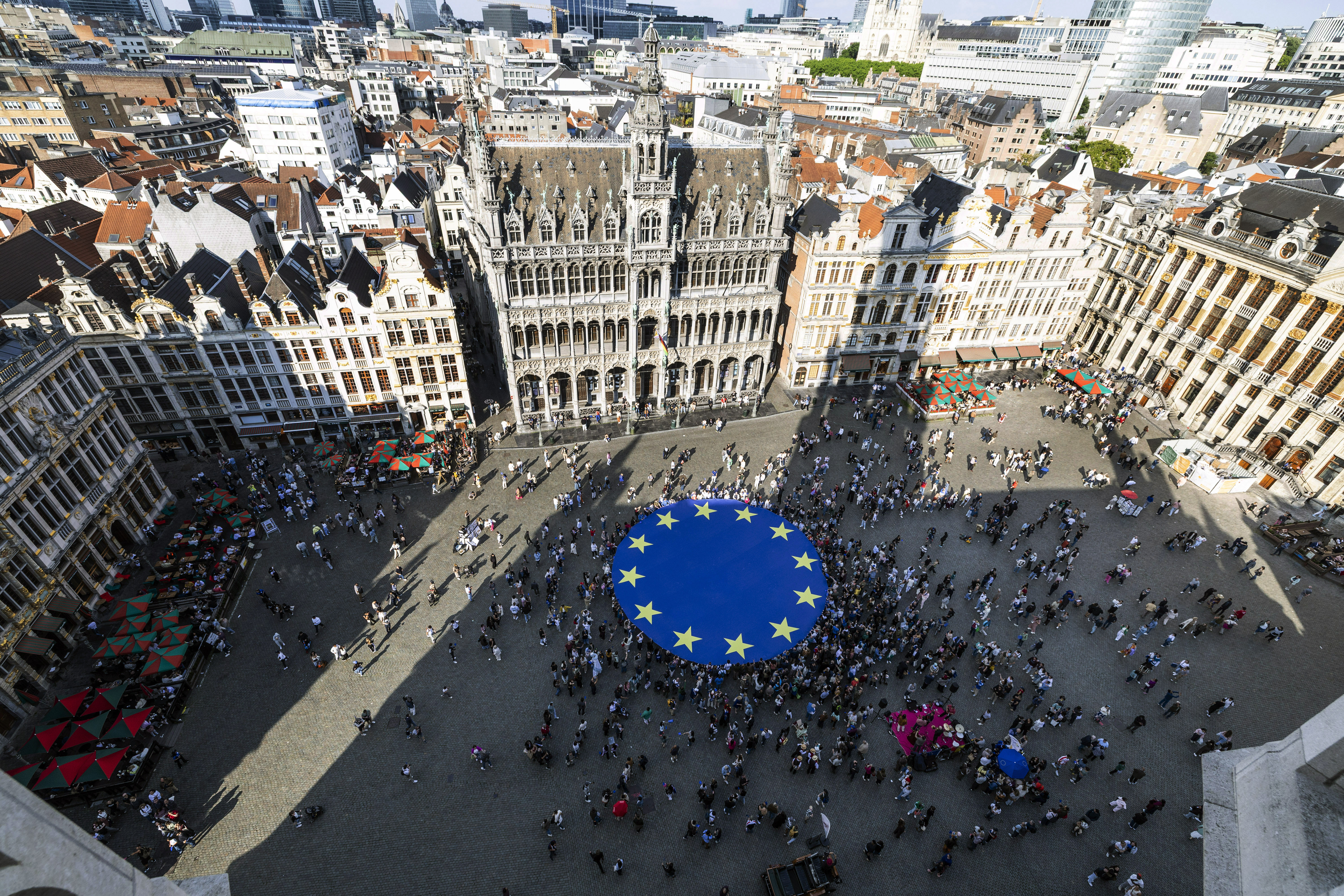
- European Flag displayed in Brussels (Belgium) during Europe Day 2026
- Observed by: Council of Europe; European Union; Luxembourg (since 2019); Kosovo (since 2008); Ukraine (since 2024); Moldova (since 2026)
- Type: Pan-European; cultural and historical
- Significance: European integration
- Date: 5 and 9 May
- Frequency: Annual

Europe Day is a day celebrating "peace and unity in Europe" celebrated on 5 May by the Council of Europe and on 9 May by the European Union.

The first recognition of Europe Day was by the Council of Europe, introduced in 1964. The European Union later started to celebrate its own European Day in commemoration of the 1950 Schuman Declaration which first proposed the European Coal and Steel Community, leading it to be referred to by some as "Schuman Day" or "Day of the united Europe". Both days are celebrated by displaying the flag of Europe.

== History ==
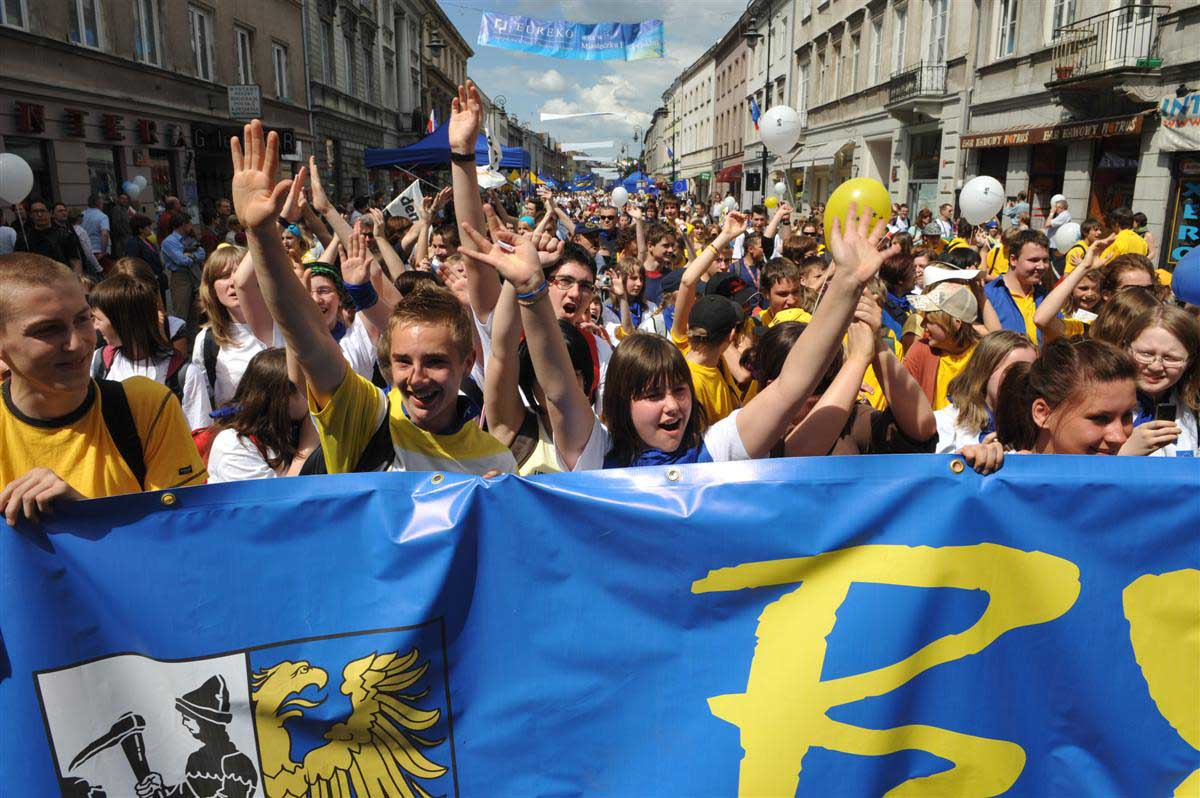
A Europe Day parade in Warsaw, Poland.

The Council of Europe was founded on 5 May 1949, and hence it chose that day for its celebrations when it established the holiday in 1964.

The "Europe Day" of the EU was introduced in 1985 by the European Communities (the predecessor organisation of the EU). The date commemorates the Schuman Declaration of 9 May 1950, put forward by Robert Schuman, which proposed the pooling of French, Italian and West German coal and steel industries. This led to the creation of the European Coal and Steel Community, the first European Community, established on 18 April 1951.

A "raft of cultural icons" was launched by the European Commission in 1985, in reaction to the report by the ad hoc commission "for a People's Europe" chaired by Pietro Adonnino. The aim was to facilitate European integration by fostering a Pan-European identity among the populations of the EC member states. The European Council adopted "Europe Day" along with the flag of Europe and other items on 29 June 1985, in Milan.

Europe Day festivities in Yerevan, Armenia.

Following the foundation of the European Union in 1993, observance of Europe Day by national and regional authorities increased significantly. Germany in particular has gone beyond celebrating just the day, since 1995 extending the observance to an entire "Europe Week" (Europawoche) centered on 9 May. In Poland, the Schuman Foundation, a Polish organisation advocating European integration established in 1991, first organised its Warsaw Schuman Parade on Europe Day 1999, at the time advocating the accession of Poland to the EU.

Observance of 9 May as "Europe Day" was reported "across Europe" as of 2008. In 2019, 9 May became an official public holiday in Luxembourg each year, to mark Europe Day. The EU's choice of the date of foundation of the European Coal and Steel Community rather than that of the EU itself established a narrative in which Schuman's speech, concerned with inducing economic growth and cementing peace between France and Germany, is presented as anticipating a "vocation of the European Union to be the main institutional framework" for the much further-reaching European integration of later decades.

The European Constitution would have legally enshrined all the European symbols in the EU treaties; however, the treaty failed to be ratified in 2005, and usage would continue only in the present de facto manner. The Constitution's replacement, the Treaty of Lisbon, contains a declaration by sixteen members supporting the symbols. The European Parliament "formally recognised" Europe Day in October 2008.

== Celebrations and commemorations ==
=== Open Doors Day ===
The EU institutions open their doors to the public every year in Brussels and Strasbourg, allowing citizens to visit these places. Moreover, many of these organize commemorative events to honor the historical importance of the date.

The bodies that choose to make this symbolic gesture are:

- European Parliament (EP)
- Council of the European Union
- European Commission (EC)
- European Economic and Social Committee (EESC)
- The European Committee of the Regions (CoR)

In 2020 and 2021, due to the COVID-19 pandemic and the consequent inability to host physical events, the EU institutions organized virtual acts to pay tribute to all those Europeans who were collaborating in the fight against the pandemic. Furthermore, 2020 marked the 70th anniversary of the Schuman declaration and the 75th anniversary of the end of the Second World War. Given the occasion, the above-mentioned EU institutions launched several online events to commemorate the importance of the date.

== Legal recognition ==
Europe Day is a public holiday for employees of European Union institutions. In 2019, it was declared a public holiday in Luxembourg, and is also a public holiday in Kosovo. It is a "memorial day" in Croatia, which is a legally-recognised day, but is not a public holiday, and a legally-recognised commemorative day in Lithuania. Europe Day in Germany and Austria is considered a flag day (German: Beflaggungstag), where flags are ordered to be shown by federal decree, while in Finland, it is considered a customary flag flying day. Europe Day is also celebrated in Romania, where it coincides with the State Independence Day of Romania (Romania's independence day).

Between 2003 and 2023, Europe Day was celebrated in Ukraine on the third Saturday of May. On 8 May 2023, the President of Ukraine established a decree to celebrate Europe Day on May 9, coinciding with EU member states.

== See also ==
- Symbols of the European Union
- Public holidays in the European Union
- Liberation Day
- Victory Day (9 May)
- Commonwealth Day
- United Nations Day
- Africa Day
- Mediterranean Day
