= Public holidays in Yugoslavia =

During the existence of Yugoslavia various public holidays were celebrated throughout or in some parts of the country. The most significant changes in the official calendar occurred in the aftermath of the World War II in Yugoslavia when the pre-war Kingdom of Yugoslavia was succeeded by the new Federative People's Republic of Yugoslavia.

== Kingdom of Yugoslavia ==
- 1 December - Unification Day
- various dates - King's Birthday

== SFR Yugoslavia State holidays ==
State (federal) holidays were:

- 1–2 January - New Year's Day
- 1–2 May - Labour Day
- 9 May - Victory Day
- 25 May - Youth Day
- 4 July - Fighter's Day
- 29 November - Republic Day

Republic holidays were celebrated in republics:

- 27 April - Day of the Liberation Front which was renamed the Day of the Resistance Against the Occupier (SR Slovenia)
- 7 July - Day of the uprising of the people of Serbia (SR Serbia)
- 13 July - Day of the uprising of the people of Montenegro (SR Montenegro)
- 22 July - Day of the uprising of the people of Slovenia (SR Slovenia)
- 27 July - Day of the uprising of the people of Croatia and Day of the uprising of the people of Bosnia and Herzegovina (SR Croatia and SR BiH)
- 2 August - First session of ASNOM (SR Macedonia)
- 11 October - Day of the uprising of the people of Macedonia (SR Macedonia)
- 1 November - All Saints' Day, renamed Day of the Dead (SR Slovenia)
- 25 November - First session of ZAVNOBiH (SR BiH)

== See also ==
- Public holidays in Bosnia and Herzegovina
- Public holidays in Croatia
- Public holidays in Kosovo
- Public holidays in Montenegro
- Public holidays in North Macedonia
- Public holidays in Serbia
- Public holidays in Slovenia
