= Public holidays in Luxembourg =

This is a list of public holidays in Luxembourg.

== Public holidays ==
Holidays
Date	English name	Luxembourgish name	German name	French name	Notes
1 January	New Year's Day	Neijoerschdag	Neujahr	Jour de l'an	
movable	Easter Monday	Ouschterméindeg	Ostermontag	Lundi de Pâques	6 April 2026; 29 March 2027
1 May	Labour Day	Dag vun der Aarbecht	Tag der Arbeit	Fête du Travail	
9 May	Europe Day	Europadag	Europatag	Journée de l'Europe	First enacted in 2019
movable	Ascension Day	Christi Himmelfaart	Christi Himmelfahrt	Ascension	14 May 2026; 6 May 2027
movable	Whit Monday	Péngschtméindeg	Pfingstmontag	Lundi de Pentecôte	25 May 2026; 17 May 2027
23 June	National Day	Nationalfeierdag	Nationalfeiertag	Fête nationale	
15 August	Assumption Day	Mariä Himmelfaart	Maria Himmelfahrt	Assomption	
1 November	All Saints' Day	Allerhellgen	Allerheiligen	Toussaint	
25 December	Christmas Day	Chrëschtdag	Weihnachten	Noël	
26 December	Saint Stephen's Day	Stiefesdag	Stefanstag	Saint Etienne	

The National Holiday celebrates the birthday of the Grand Duke and used to be movable to coincide with the actual birthday of monarch. To avoid cold weather on the 5 January birthday of Grand Duke Jean (reigned 1964-2000), the Grand Duke's Official Birthday celebration was pinned since 1962 to Jean's name day on 23 June, and was maintained under the reign of his successor Henri.

== Unofficial holidays ==
Good Friday (Friday before Easter Sunday) is a bank holiday, meaning that it is only a public holiday for bank employees.

Local complementary unofficial holidays may exist, like the Kermesse Day (known as Kiermes) that always fall on a Monday in the city of Luxembourg, or the Carnival Day also happening in the capital city.

Civil servants are also entitled to two additional half-day public holidays: Whit Tuesday and the afternoon of Christmas Eve.
