= National Protection (Croatia) =

- Narodna zaštita
- Active: 15 March 1991 – 31 December 1991
- Disbanded: Integrated into the Croatian Army
- Country: Croatia
- Type: Auxiliary force
- Size: 140,000
- Anniversaries: 15 March
- Engagements: Battle of the Barracks
- Decorations: Charter of the Republic of Croatia

Commanders
- Commander of the National Protection of Zagreb: Milivoj Kujundžić

The National Protection (Croatian: Narodna zaštita) was a voluntary civil defence force established in Croatia in 1991 during the early phase of the Croatian War of Independence.

== History ==
At a meeting of the HDZ Central Committee on March 13, 1991, Milivoj Kujundžić proposed the establishment of an organization called the National Protection. On March 15, at the 1st session of the Inter-Party Council of the Republic of Croatia, a conclusion on the establishment of the National Protection was adopted. On March 22, at the 2nd session of the council chaired by president Franjo Tuđman, the Inter-Party Council of National Protection was formed with the main task of defending Croatia.

On April 5, 1991, Tuđman issued a proclamation, calling on everyone who wished to join the "volunteer units of the National Protection and stand in defence of the homeland, the Republic of Croatia - which is in danger". On that same day, the National Protection of Zagreb was formed and Milivoj Kujundžić was appointed as its commander.

At first, the National Protection presented itself as an unarmed organization, as Croatia was not independent at the time and could not have an army. According to data from the Defense Office, the National Protection had around 140,000 members, around 50,000 of whom later joined the army or police. Its task was to secure all significant municipal and health facilities, food warehouses, roads, and strategic raw material warehouses. The National Protection also enabled the establishment of the Croatian National Guard on April 23, 1991.

On September 13, 1991, Tuđman made a decision to blockade JNA barracks in Croatia. On September 14, forces of the National Guard, the Ministry of the Interior, and the National Protection started a blockade of barracks and airports across Croatia, beginning the Battle of the Barracks. During the battle, the National Protection blockaded most military facilities, participated in and independently captured military facilities from the JNA and extracted combat equipment and ammunition from captured military facilities and warehouses, among other tasks.

On December 24, 1991, Tuđman issued the Decision on the organization of the Home Guard which declared that "conscripts who are members of the National Protection, who are not assigned for combat operations, shall be transferred to Home Guard units". The decision took effect on December 31, 1991. The National Protection of Osijek ceased operations on April 24, 1992, while the National Protection of Rijeka ended its activities in June 1992.

== Legacy ==
On March 15, 2011, the twentieth anniversary of the establishment of the National Protection, president Ivo Josipović awarded the Charter of the Republic of Croatia to the National Protection.

In November 2011, the Croatian Parliament declared the Day of the Establishment of the National Protection an official memorial day in Croatia.
