= Public holidays in Kosovo =

This is a list of public holidays in Kosovo.

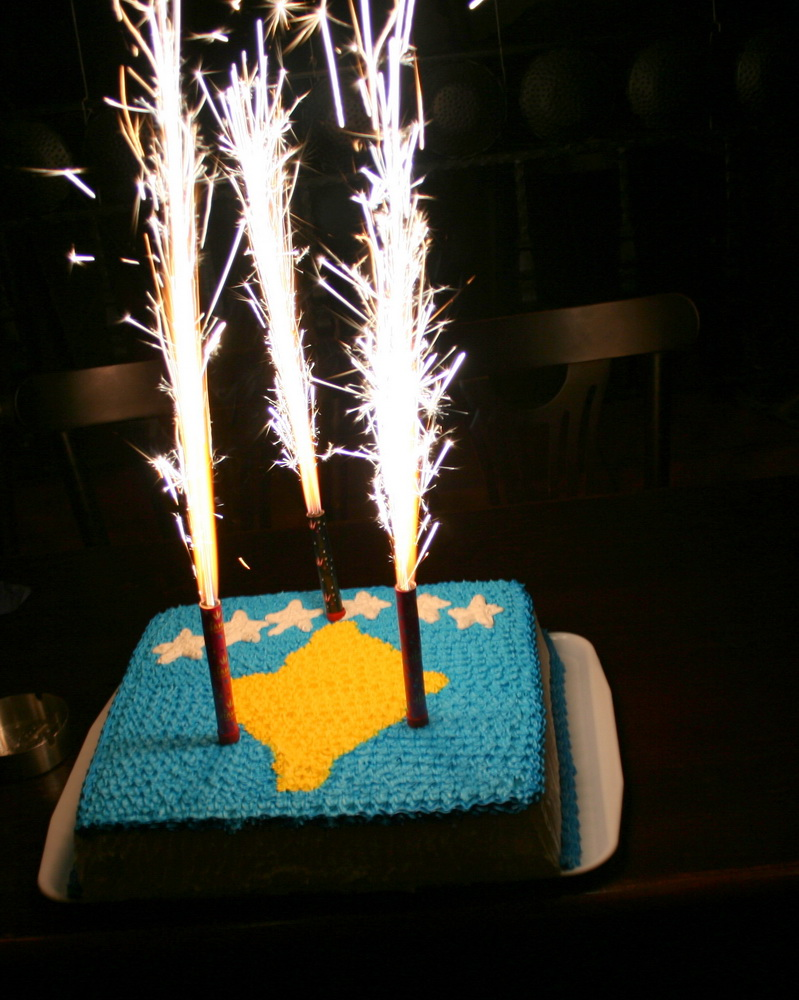
Kosovo celebrates Independence Day on February 17

Date	English name	Local name	Notes
1–2 January	New Year's Day	Viti i Ri	
7 January	Orthodox Christmas	Krishtlindjet Ortodokse	Orthodox
17 February	Independence Day	Dita e Pavarësisë së Republikës së Kosovës	
9 April	Constitution Day	Dita e Kushtetutës së Republikës së Kosovës	
1 May	International Labor Day	Dita Ndërkombëtare e Punës	
9 May	Europe Day	Dita e Evropës	
25 December	Catholic Christmas	Krishtlindjet Katolike	Catholic
1 Shawwal	Eid al-Fitr	Bajrami i Madh, dita e parë	Muslim
10 Dhu al-Hijjah	Eid al-Adha	Bajrami i Vogël, dita e parë	Muslim
Variable	Catholic Easter	Pashkët Katolike	Catholic
Variable	Orthodox Easter	Pashkët Ortodokse	Orthodox

== See also ==
- Public holidays in Yugoslavia
