= Public holidays in Bosnia and Herzegovina =

The holidays of Bosnia and Herzegovina include, in various jurisdictions:

== Public holidays ==
Public holiday of Bosnia and Herzegovina
Public holiday of the Federation of Bosnia and Herzegovina
Public holiday of Republika Srpska
Public holiday of Brčko District
Catholic feast (public holiday of cantons and municipalities in which Croats are the majority)
Serbian Orthodox feast (public holiday of municipalities in which Serbs are the majority)
Islamic feast (public holiday of cantons and municipalities in which Bosniaks are the majority)

Date	English name	Local name	Remarks
1 January	New Year's Day	Nova Godina	
2 January	2nd day of the New Year	Drugi dan Nove Godine	
6 January	Epiphany	Bogojavljenje (Sveta Tri kralja)	
7 January	Serbian Orthodox Christmas	Božić (Божић)	
9 January	Republic Day	Dan Republike	The Bosnian Constitutional Court declared the annual holiday unconstitutional
14 January	New Year's Day	Nova godina (Нова година)	According to the Julian calendar
1 March	Independence Day	Dan nezavisnosti	
8 March	Brčko District Establishment Day	Dan uspostavljanja Brčko Distrikta	
...	Easter	Uskrs	Easter always falls on a Sunday from 22 March to 25 April inclusive.
...	Easter Monday	Uskrsni ponedjeljak	Easter Monday always falls on a Monday from 23 March to 26 April inclusive.
...	Easter	Vaskrs (Васкрс)	
1 May	Labour Day	Dan rada	
2 May	2nd day of the Labour Day	Drugi dan Dana rada	
60 days post Easter	Corpus Christi	Tijelovo or Brašančevo	
9 May	Victory Day	Dan pobjede	
15 August	Assumption of Mary	Uznesenje Blažene Djevice Marije (Velika Gospa)	
28 August	Assumption of Mary	Velika Gospojina (Велика Госпојина)	
1 November	All Saints Day	Svi Sveti	
2 November	All Souls Day	Dušni dan	
21 November	Dayton Agreement Day	Dan uspostave Opšteg okvirnog sporazuma za mir u Bosni i Hercegovini	
25 November	Statehood Day	Dan državnosti	This holiday is celebrated in all cantons of the Federation entity except West Herzegovina
25 December	Catholic Christmas	Božić	
26 December	Saint Stephen's Day	Stipandan (Stjepandan)	
1–3 Shawwal	Feast of Breaking the Fast	Ramazanski Bajram	Religious holiday for 3 days
10–13 Dhu'l-Hijja	Feast of the Sacrifice	Kurban Bajram	Religious holiday for 4 days

== See also ==
- Public holidays in Yugoslavia
