= Holidays in Europe =

Holidays in Europe may refer to:

- Holidays in Europe (The Naughty Nought), the third and final album by Icelandic post-punk group KUKL, released in 1986
- Public holidays in the European Union
