= Mediterranean Day =

Commemoration of the founding of the Union for the Mediterranean

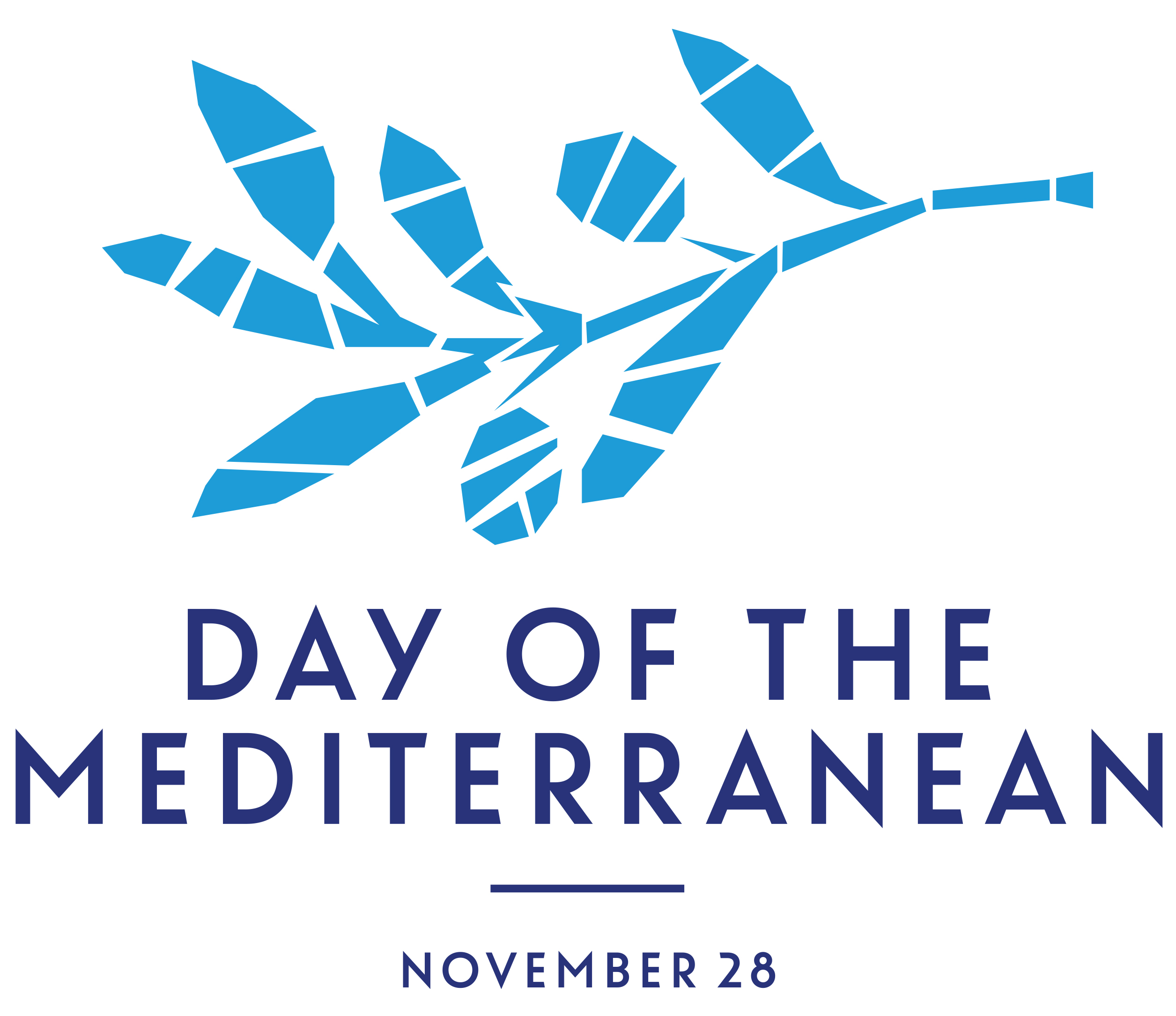
- Official Logo of the Day of the Mediterranean (in English)
- Observed by: Member states of the Union for the Mediterranean
- Type: International; cultural and historical
- Significance: Anniversary of the conference starting the Barcelona Process
- Date: 28 November
- Next time: 28 November 2026
- Frequency: annual

Mediterranean Day (also known as International Day of the Mediterranean and Day of the Mediterranean) is the annual commemoration of the foundation of the Barcelona Process on 28 November 1995. It is celebrated in the Mediterranean Basin, as well as in the European Union countries.

== Background ==
The Barcelona Process was launched in the Euro-Mediterranean Conference in Barcelona on 28 November 1995 with the aim of strengthening relations between Europe and the Southern Mediterranean countries. On that date, the ministers of Foreign Affairs of the EU and 12 southern and eastern Mediterranean countries held the conference and signed an agreement to launch the Euro-Mediterranean Partnership Process. The Barcelona Process was born as a new dialogue framework out of a vocation to convert the Mediterranean region into a common space for peace, stability, security and shared socio-economic progress and dialogue between peoples.

The Barcelona Process would lead to the creation of the Union for the Mediterranean (UfM) in 2008.

The first Day of the Mediterranean was celebrated on 28 of November 2021, with over 75 activities in 18 Euro-Mediterranean countries.
