= Public holidays in Montenegro =

This is a list of public holidays in Montenegro.

== Official holidays ==
All state and other holidays are non-working days. The religious holidays are non-working days for the specific religious communities.

Note: If the first day of State and Other holidays falls on Sunday, then the next two working days are non-working days (Monday and Tuesday). If the first day of State and Other holidays falls on Saturday, then only one next working day is a non-working day (Monday).

Date	Name	Local name	2015 Date	Remarks
State holidays
21 May	Independence Day	Dan nezavisnosti Дан независности	21 May	Anniversary of the Montenegrin independence referendum in 2006.
22 May	Independence Day	Dan nezavisnosti Дан независности	21 May	Anniversary of the Montenegrin independence referendum in 2006.
22 May	Independence Day	Dan nezavisnosti Дан независности	22 May	Anniversary of the Montenegrin independence referendum in 2006.
13 July	Statehood Day	Dan državnosti Дан државности	13 July	Anniversary of the day in 1878 on which the Berlin Congress recognized Montenegro as an independent state, as well as the 13 July Uprising against the Axis forces in 1941
14 July	Statehood Day	Dan državnosti Дан државности	14 July	Anniversary of the day in 1878 on which the Berlin Congress recognized Montenegro as an independent state, as well as the 13 July Uprising against the Axis forces in 1941
Other holidays
1 January	New Year's Day	Nova godina Нова година	1 January	
2 January	New Year's Day	Nova godina Нова година	2 January	
1 May	Labour Day	Praznik rada Празник рада	1 May	
2 May	Labour Day	Praznik rada Празник рада	2 May	
13 November	Njegos Day	Njegošev dan Његошев дан	13 November	
14 November	Njegos Day	Njegošev dan Његошев дан	14 November	
Religious holidays
Orthodox holidays
6 January	Orthodox Christmas Eve	Badnji dan Бадњи дан	6 January	Orthodox Church uses the Julian Calendar.
7 January	Orthodox Christmas	Božić; Божић	7 January	Orthodox Church uses the Julian Calendar.
8 January	Orthodox Christmas	Božić; Божић	8 January	Orthodox Church uses the Julian Calendar.
varies	Orthodox Good Friday	Veliki petak Велики петак	10 April	Orthodox Church calculates Easter using Orthodox Computus. By the law only the second day of Easter, the Easter Monday, is a holiday.
varies	Orthodox Easter Monday	Veliki ponedeljak Велики понедељак	13 April	Orthodox Church calculates Easter using Orthodox Computus. By the law only the second day of Easter, the Easter Monday, is a holiday.
Religious holidays				Orthodox Church calculates Easter using Orthodox Computus. By the law only the second day of Easter, the Easter Monday, is a holiday.
Catholic holidays
24 December	Christmas Eve	Badnji dan	24 December	
25 December	Christmas	Božić	25 December	
26 December	Christmas	Božić	26 December	
varies	Good Friday	Veliki petak	3 April	
varies	Easter	Uskrs	5 April	By the law only the second day of Easter, the Easter Monday, is a holiday.
varies	Easter	Uskrs	6 April	By the law only the second day of Easter, the Easter Monday, is a holiday.
1 November	All Saints' Day	Svi Sveti	1 November	
Muslim holidays
1 Shawwal	Eid al-Fitr	Ramazanski bajram	17 July	End of Ramadan.
2 Shawwal	Eid al-Fitr	Ramazanski bajram	18 July	End of Ramadan.
3 Shawwal	Eid al-Fitr	Ramazanski bajram	19 July	End of Ramadan.
10 Dhu al-Hijjah	Eid al-Adha	Kurbanski bajram	24 September	Although Eid al-Adha lasts four days only three days are holidays according to the law.
11 Dhu al-Hijjah	Eid al-Adha	Kurbanski bajram	25 September	Although Eid al-Adha lasts four days only three days are holidays according to the law.
12 Dhu al-Hijjah	Eid al-Adha	Kurbanski bajram	26 September	Although Eid al-Adha lasts four days only three days are holidays according to the law.
Jewish holidays
15 Nisan	Pesach	Pasha	3 April	
16 Nisan	Pesach	Pasha	4 April	
10 Tishrei	Yom Kippur	Jom Kipur	23 September	
11 Tishrei	Yom Kippur	Jom Kipur	24 September	

== Unofficial holidays ==
In addition to the official state, other and religious holidays; many other religious, ethnic, and other traditional holidays populate the calendar. These are rarely observed by businesses as non-working days.

Date	Name	Local name	2015 Date	Remarks
Religious holidays
Orthodox holidays
14 January	Orthodox New Year	Pravoslavna Nova godina Православна Нова година	14 January	Celebrated as the start of the New Year by the Julian calendar.
Catholic holidays
15 August	Assumption of Mary	Velika Gospa	15 August	
Muslim holidays
1 Muharram	Islamic New Year	Nova hidžretska godina	14 October	
12 Rabi' al-awwal	Mawlid	Mevlud	23 December	
27 Rajab	Laylat al-Mi'raj	Lejletul Mi'radž	16 May	
15 Sha'aban	Laylat al-Bara'at	Lejletul berat	2 June	
1 Ramadan	First day of Ramadan	Prvi dan posta	18 June	
27 Ramadan	Laylat al-Qadr	Lejletul kadr	14 July	
Jewish holidays
1 Tishrei	Rosh Hashanah	Roš Hašana	13 September	

== See also ==
- Public holidays in Yugoslavia
