= John of Hildesheim =

John of Hildesheim, O.Carm. (Latin: Johannes de Hildesheim) (born in 1310/1320, Hildesheim, and died in 1375, Marienau) was a writer and Carmelite friar from the German town of Hildesheim, then the capital of the Prince-Bishopric of Hildesheim, an independent state within the Holy Roman Empire. Due to his status as a friar, he was able to travel through Germany, France and Italy, and his broad literary opus includes works of philosophy, theology and poetry.

John is chiefly known as the author of the popular Historia Trium Regum (History of the Three Kings), which records the history of the Three Magi, derived from the Biblical story, including their background before their journey to Bethlehem trailing the famous Star, their lives after the Adoration, and the history of their relics (reputed to lie in the Shrine of the Three Kings at Cologne Cathedral in Cologne, Germany). Also included is a lengthy account of the Magi's descendant, the fabled priest-king Prester John of medieval legend. The work was attributed to John of Hildesheim by later commentators like Johannes Trithemius, but not all modern historians take this for granted.

Others of John's works include The Mirror of the Source of Life, a treatise on the nature of life, and writings in defense of the Carmelite Order.
