= Santi Re Magi, Milan =

Church in Milan, Italy

Coordinates: 45°30′09″N 9°14′36″E

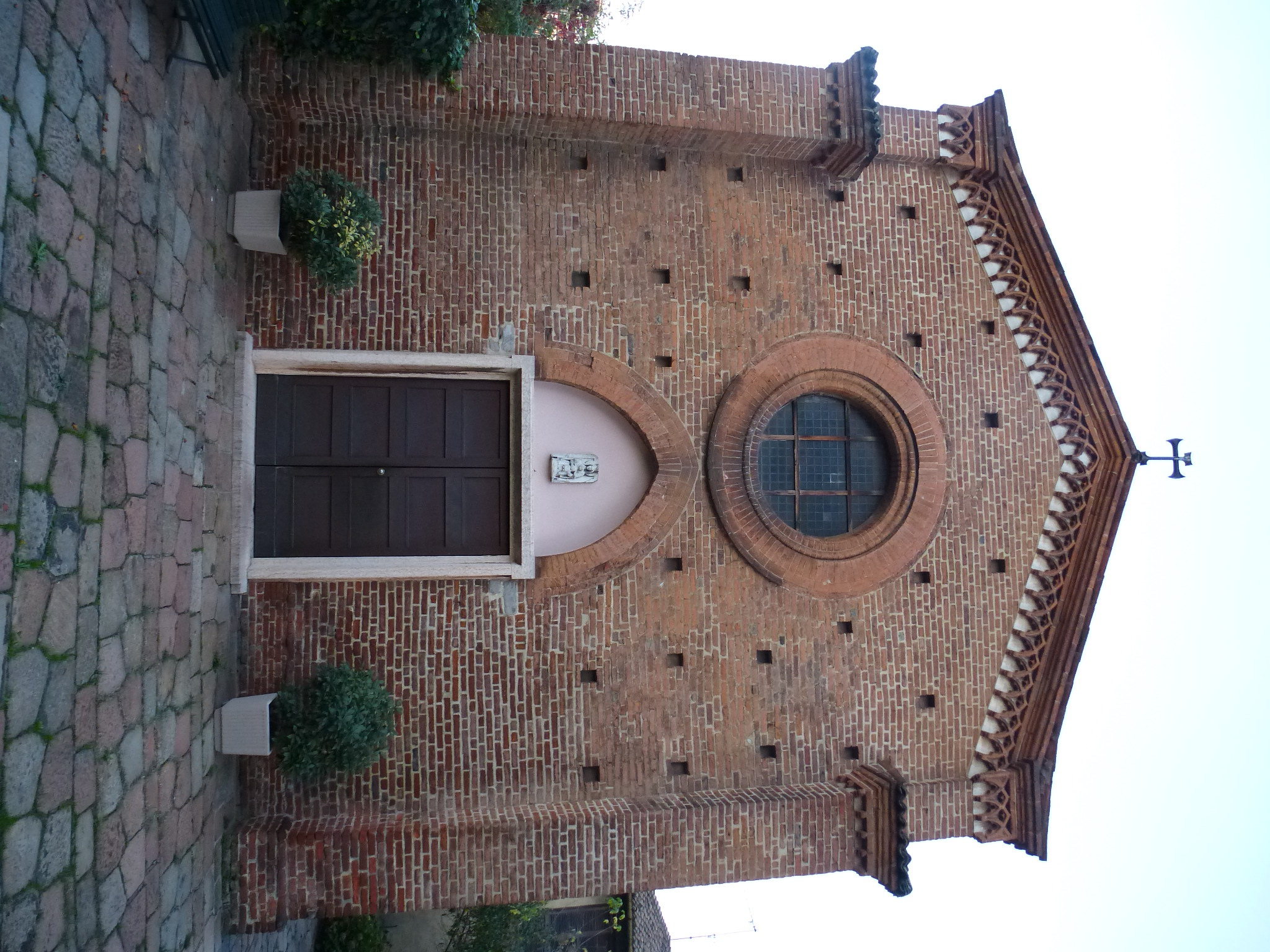
Façade of the Church

Chiesa dei Santi Re Magi (literally, Church of the Holy Magi Kings in English) is a church in Milan, Italy. Constructed from the 7th through 14th centuries, the Church is considered a cultural good of the Lombardy.

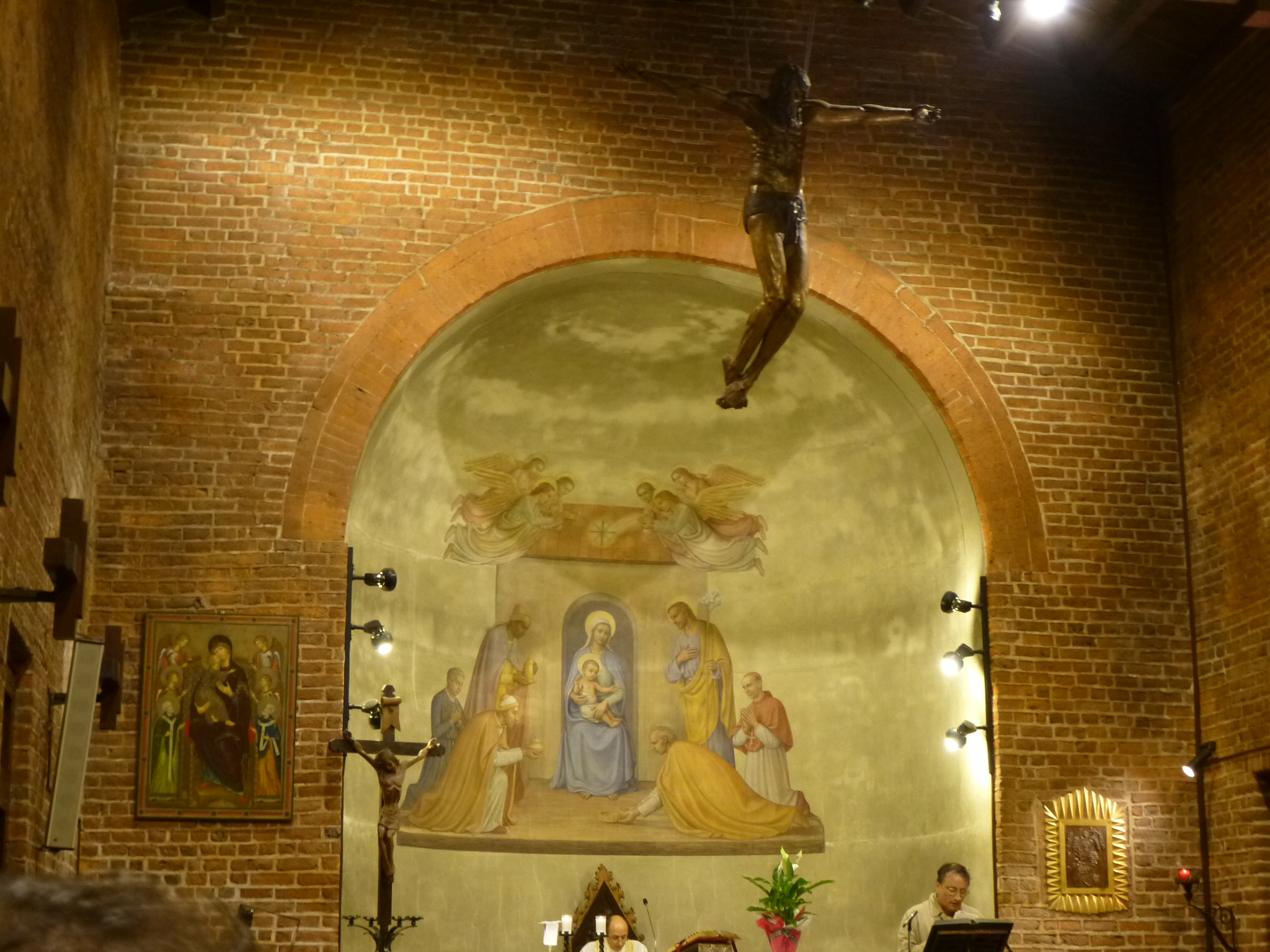
Inside of the Church
