= Biblical Magi =

Group of distinguished foreigners who visited the infant Jesus after his birth

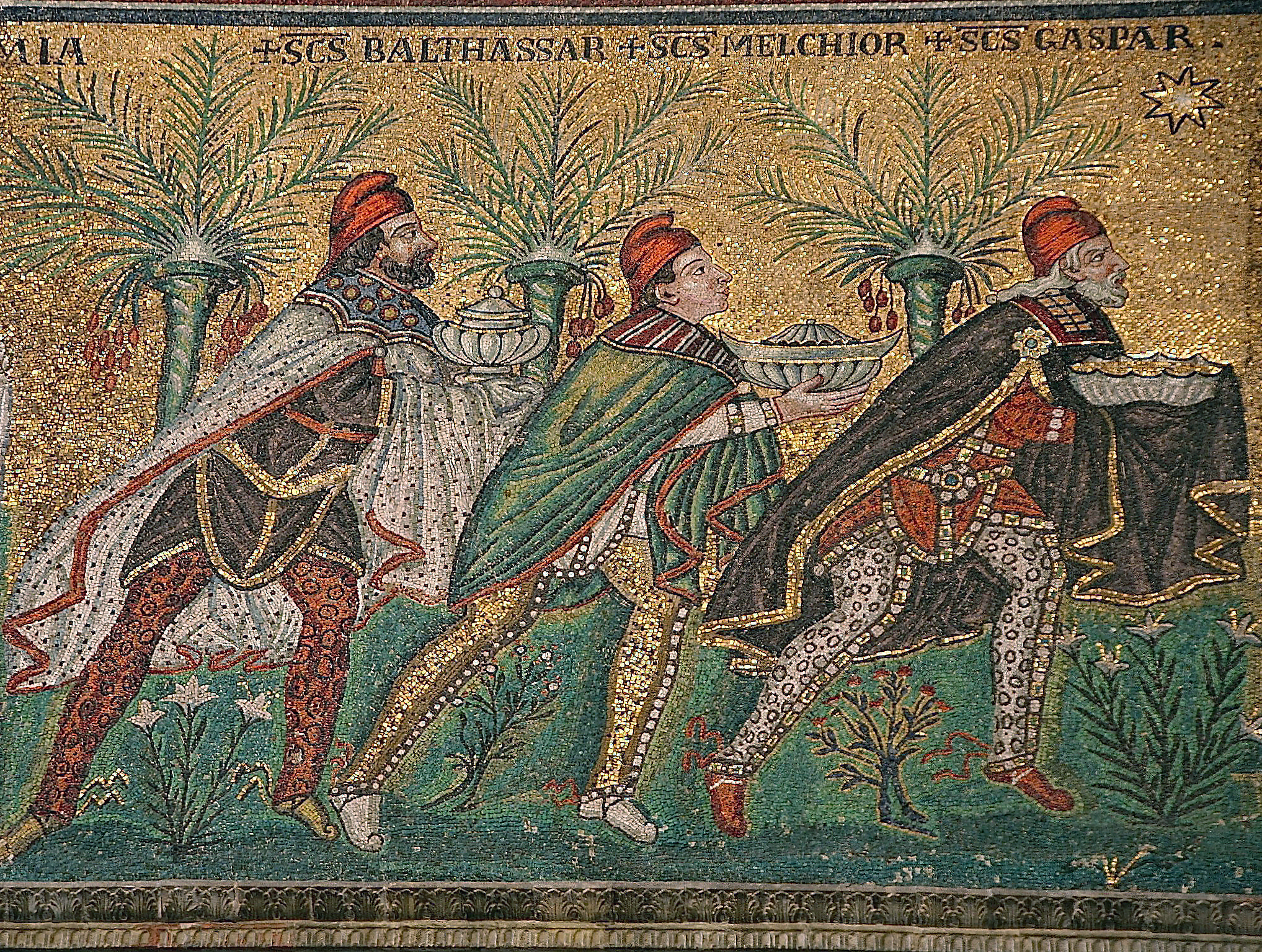
The Three Magi, Byzantine mosaic, c. 565, Basilica of Sant'Apollinare Nuovo, Ravenna, Italy (restored during the 19th century). As here, Byzantine art usually depicts the Magi in Persian clothing, which includes breeches, capes, and Phrygian caps.

In Christianity, the Biblical Magi (Note: Koine Greek: μάγοι, romanized: mágoi; from Middle Persian moɣ(mard), from Old Persian magu- 'Zoroastrian clergyman'.) (/ˈmeɪdʒaɪ/ MAY-jy or /ˈmædʒaɪ/ MAJ-eye; singular: magus), also known as the Three Wise Men, Three Kings, and Three Magi, (Note: Sometimes referred to simply as Wise Men, Kings, and Magi.) are distinguished foreigners who visit the infant Jesus after his birth, bearing gifts of gold, frankincense, and myrrh. In Western Christianity, they are commemorated on the feast day of Epiphany—sometimes called "Three Kings Day"—and commonly appear in the nativity celebrations of Christmas; in Eastern Christianity, they are commemorated on Christmas day.

The Magi appear solely in the Gospel of Matthew, which states that they "saw his star in the east" (Note: Greek: ἀπὸ ἀνατολῶν, romanized: apo anatolōn) and came to worship the "one who has been born king of the Jews". Their names, origins, appearances, and exact number are unmentioned and derive from the inferences or traditions of later Christians. In Western and Eastern Orthodox Christianity, they are usually assumed to have been three in number, corresponding with each gift; in Syriac Christianity, they often number twelve. Likewise, the Magi's social status is never stated. Although some biblical translations describe them as astrologers, they were increasingly identified as kings by at least the third century, which conformed with Christian interpretations of Old Testament prophecies that the messiah would be worshipped by kings.

The mystery of the Magi's identities and background, combined with their theological significance, has made them prominent figures in the Christian tradition; they are venerated as saints or even martyrs in many Christian communities, and are the subject of numerous artworks, legends, and customs. Both secular and Christian observers have noted that the Magi popularly serve as a means of expressing various ideas, symbols, and themes. Many scholars regard the Magi as legendary rather than historical figures.

== Biblical account ==
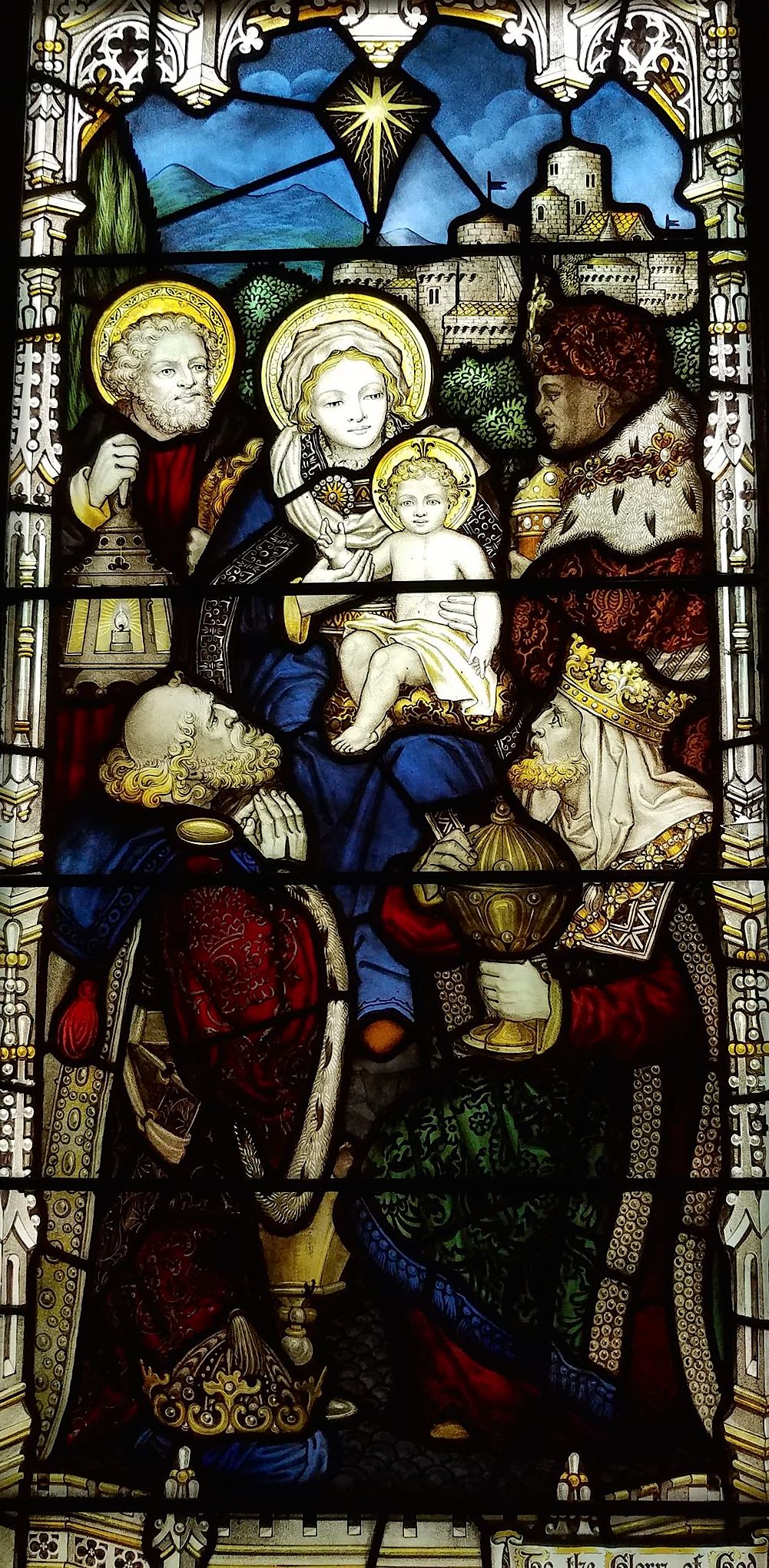
Biblical Magi stained glass window, c. 1896, at the Church of the Good Shepherd (Rosemont, Pennsylvania), showing the Three Magi with Joseph, Mary, and Jesus.

Traditional nativity scenes depict three "wise men" visiting the infant Jesus on the night of his birth, in a manger accompanied by the shepherds and angels, but this should be understood as an artistic convention allowing the two separate scenes of the Adoration of the Shepherds on the birth night and the later Adoration of the Magi to be combined for convenience. The single biblical account in Matthew 2 simply presents an event at an unspecified point after Jesus's birth in which an unnumbered party of unnamed "wise men" (μάγοι, mágoi) visit him in a house (οἰκίαν, oikian), not a stable. The New Revised Standard Version of Matthew 2:1–12 describes the visit of the Magi in this manner:

In the time of King Herod, after Jesus was born in Bethlehem of Judea, wise men from the East came to Jerusalem, asking, "Where is the child who has been born king of the Jews? For we observed his star at its rising, and have come to pay him homage." When King Herod heard this, he was frightened and all Jerusalem with him; and calling together all the chief priests and scribes of the people, he inquired of them where the Messiah was to be born. They told him, "In Bethlehem of Judea; for so it has been written by the prophet: 'And you, Bethlehem, in the land of Judah, are by no means least among the rulers of Judah; for from you shall come a ruler who is to shepherd my people Israel.'" Then Herod secretly called for the wise men and learned from them the exact time when the star had appeared. Then he sent them to Bethlehem, saying, "Go and search diligently for the child; and when you have found him, bring me word so that I may also go and pay him homage." When they had heard the king, they set out; and there, ahead of them, went the star that they had seen at its rising, until it stopped over the place where the child was. When they saw that the star had stopped, they were overwhelmed with joy. On entering the house, they saw the child with Mary his mother; and they knelt down and paid him homage. Then, opening their treasure chests, they offered him gifts of gold, frankincense, and myrrh. And having been warned in a dream not to return to Herod, they left for their own country by another path.

The text specifies no interval between the birth and the visit, and artistic depictions and the closeness of the traditional dates of December 25 and January 6 encourage the popular assumption that the visit took place the same winter as the birth, but later traditions varied, with the visit taken as occurring up to two winters later. This maximum interval explained Herod's command at Matthew 2:16–18 that the Massacre of the Innocents included boys up to two years old. Some more recent commentators, not tied to the traditional feast days, suggest a variety of intervals.

The wise men are mentioned twice shortly thereafter in verse 16, in reference to their avoidance of Herod after seeing Jesus, and what Herod had learned from their earlier meeting. The star which they followed has traditionally become known as the Star of Bethlehem.

== Description ==
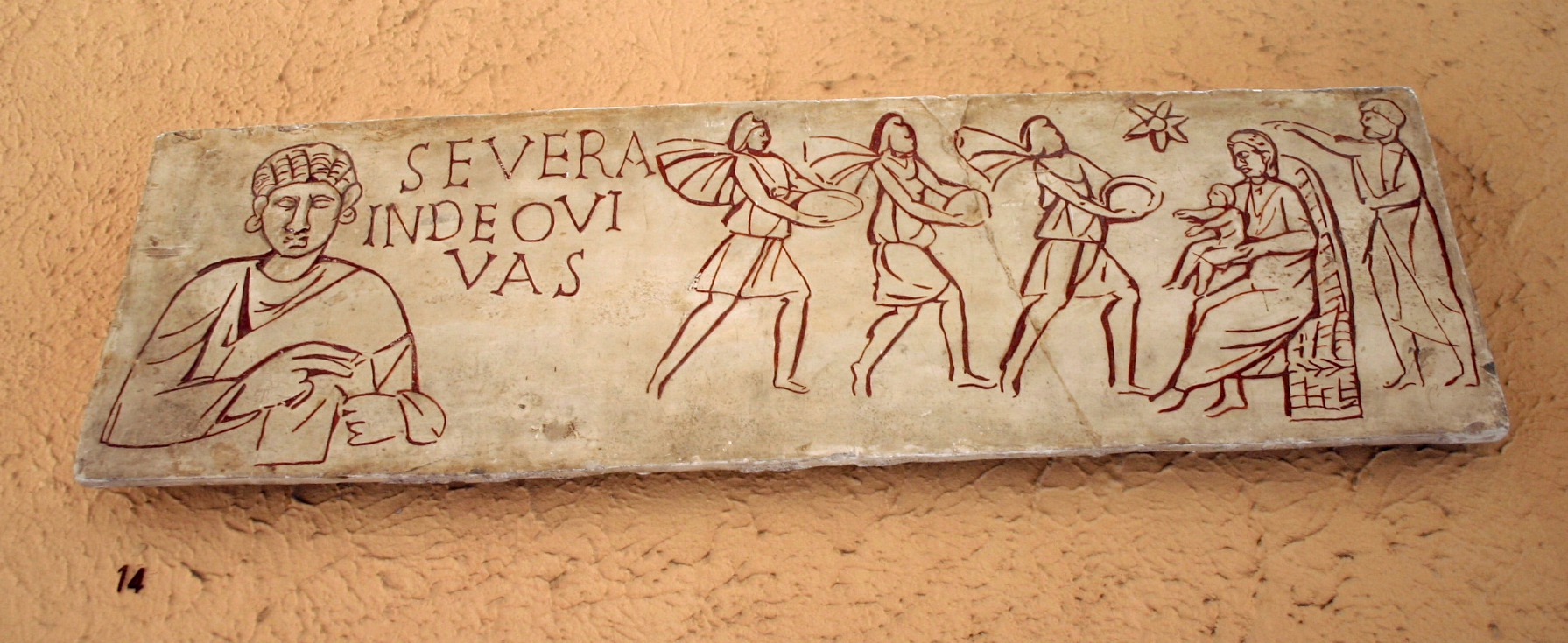
Incised third century A.D. sarcophagus slab depicts the Adoration of the Magi, from the Catacombs of Rome – translated as, "Severa, may you live in God", Severa being the woman buried in the sarcophagus and likely the figure to the left of the inscription.

The Magi are popularly referred to as wise men and kings. The word magi is the plural of Latin magus, borrowed from Greek μάγος (magos), as used in the original Greek text of the Gospel of Matthew (in the plural: μάγοι, magoi). The Greek magos itself is derived from Old Persian maguš, which in turn originated from the Avestan magâunô, referring to the Iranian priestly caste of Zoroastrianism. Within this tradition, priests paid particular attention to the stars and gained an international reputation for astrology, which was at that time highly regarded as a science. Their religious practices and astrological abilities caused derivatives of the term Magi to be applied to the occult in general and led to the English term magic.

The King James Version translates "magi" as wise men; the same translation is applied to the wise men led by Daniel of earlier Hebrew Scriptures (Daniel 2:48). The same word is given as sorcerer and sorcery when describing "Elymas the sorcerer" in Acts 13:6–11, and Simon Magus, considered a heretic by the early Church, in Acts 8:9–13. Several translations refer to the men outright as astrologers at Matthew Chapter 2, including New English Bible (1961); The New Testament in Modern English (J.B.Phillips, 1972); Twentieth Century New Testament (1904 revised edition); Amplified Bible (1958, New Testament); An American Translation (1935, Goodspeed); and The Living Bible (K. Taylor, 1962, New Testament).

Although the Magi are commonly referred to as "kings", there is nothing in the Gospel of Matthew that implies they were rulers of any kind. The identification of the Magi as kings is linked to Old Testament prophecies that describe the Messiah being worshipped by kings in Isaiah 60:3, Psalm 68:29, and Psalm 72:10, which reads, "Yea, all kings shall fall down before him: all nations serve him." Early readers reinterpreted Matthew in light of these prophecies and elevated the Magi to kings, which became widely accepted by at least 500 A.D. Later Christian interpretation stressed the adoration of the Magi and shepherds as the first recognition by humans of Christ as the Redeemer. However, the Protestant reformer John Calvin was vehemently opposed to referring to the Magi as kings, writing: "But the most ridiculous contrivance of the Papists on this subject is, that those men were kings... Beyond all doubt, they have been stupefied by a righteous judgment of God, that all might laugh at [their] gross ignorance."

== Identities and background ==
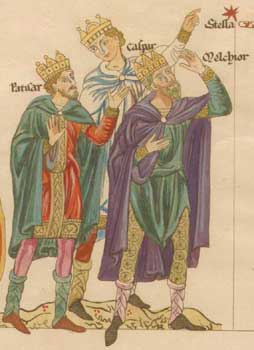
The three Magi (named Balthazar, Caspar, and Melchior), from Herrad of Landsberg's Hortus deliciarum (12th century)

The names and origins of the Magi are never given in scripture, but have been provided by various traditions and legends.

Among Western Christians, the earliest and most common names are:

- Melchior (/ˈmɛlkiɔːr/; also Melichior).
- Caspar (/ˈkæspər/ or /ˈkæspɑːr/; also Gaspar, Jaspar, Jaspas, Gathaspa, and other variations).
- Balthazar (/ˈbælθəzɑːr/ or /bælˈθæzər/; also Balthasar, Balthassar, and Bithisarea).

These names first appear in an eighth-century religious chronicle, Excerpta Latina Barbari, which is a Latin translation of a lost Greek manuscript probably composed in Alexandria roughly two centuries earlier. Another eighth century text, Collectanea et Flores, which was likewise a Latin translation from an original Greek account, continues the tradition of three kings and their names and gives additional details.

One candidate for the origin of the name Caspar appears in the apocryphal Acts of Thomas, which gives the account of Thomas the Apostle's visit to the Indo-Parthian King Gondophares I (AD 21– c. 47), also known as Gudapharasa, from which "Caspar" might derive as corruption of "Gaspar". Gondophares had declared independence from the Arsacids and ruled a kingdom spanning present-day Iran, Afghanistan, and Pakistan. According to Ernst Herzfeld, his name is perpetuated in the name of the Afghan city Kandahar, which he is said to have founded under the name Gundopharron.

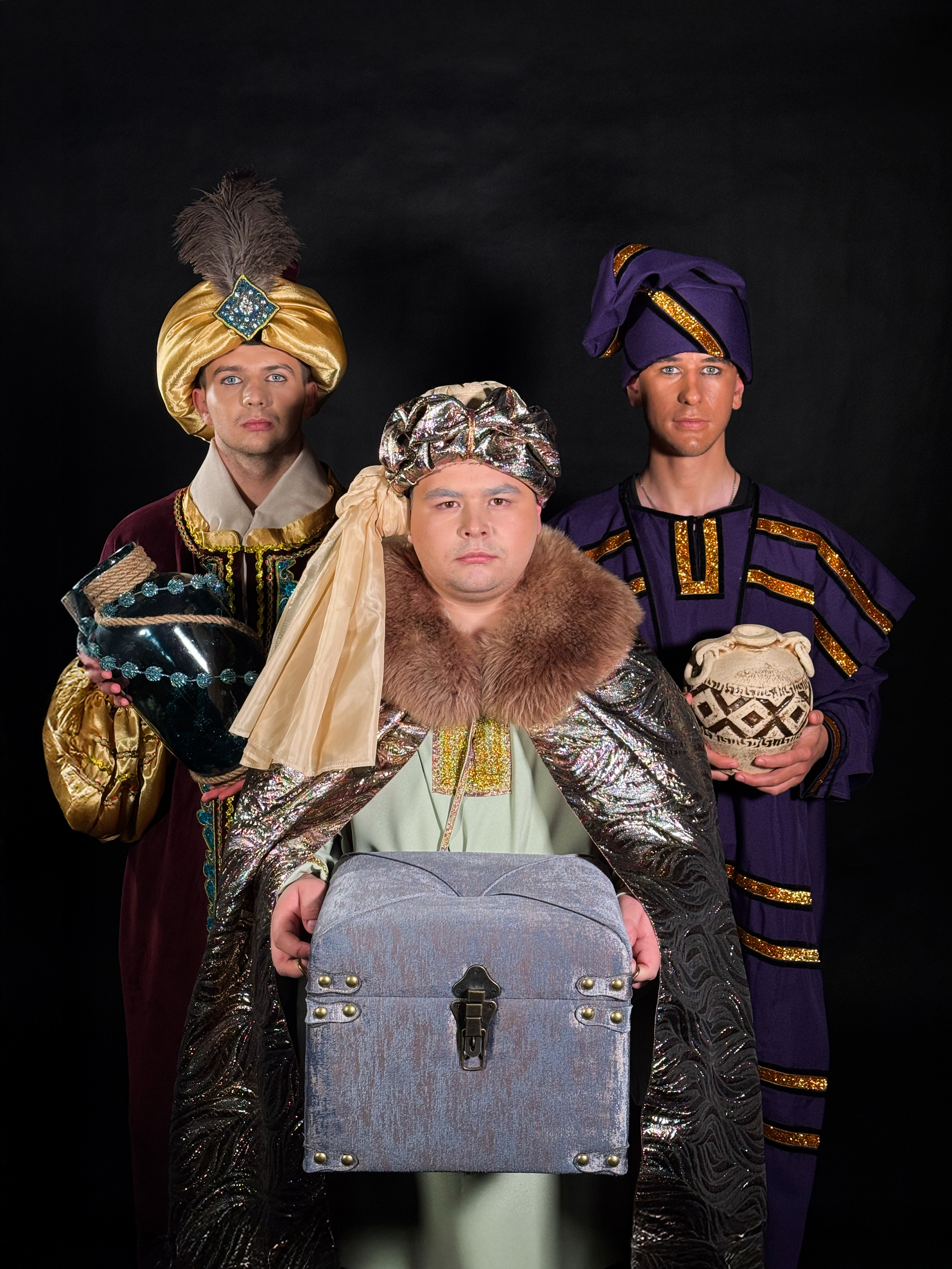
The Three Kings (Biblical Magi): Melchior, Balthazar, and Caspar. Photo from the "Virtual Vertep Vision" collection. Project "BoykoTravel: Vertep PreServes Ukraine".

Within Eastern Christianity, the Magi have varied names. Among Syrian Christians, they are Larvandad, Gushnasaph, and Hormisdas, which are approximations of typical Zoroastrian names, in the Ethiopian Orthodox Church, they are Hor, Karsudan, and Basanater, while Armenian Catholics have Kagpha, Badadakharida and Badadilma.

The list given by Michael the Syrian in his chronicle has these eleven names:

- Dahdnadur, son of Artaban
- Waštaph, son of Gudpir
- Aršak, son of Mahduq
- Zerwand, son of Warudud
- Ariwah, son of Khosrow
- Arṭaḥšišt, son of Ḥōlīṭ
- Eštanbuzan, son of Šišrawan
- Mahduq, son of Hawahm
- Aḥšireš, son of Ṣaḥban
- Ṣardanaḥ, son of Baladan
- Marduk, son of Bīl

These are all Iranian, or pseudo-Iranian, Zoroastrian names. Waštaph certainly reflects Vishtaspa, the name of the first king to have converted to Zoroastrianism, but also a common Zoroastrian name at the time. Arṭaḥšišt is an archaic form of the common name Ardashir. Marduk should be a variant of mard "man" with the suffix -ōk. This fits with the fact that, in Michael's Chronicle, "mage" in other parts simply means "Zoroastrian", and with the idea that these mage kings should simply be Zoroastrian officials, coming to recognise Jesus as a holy figure.

Many Chinese Christians believe that one of the magi came from China.

=== Country of origin and journey ===
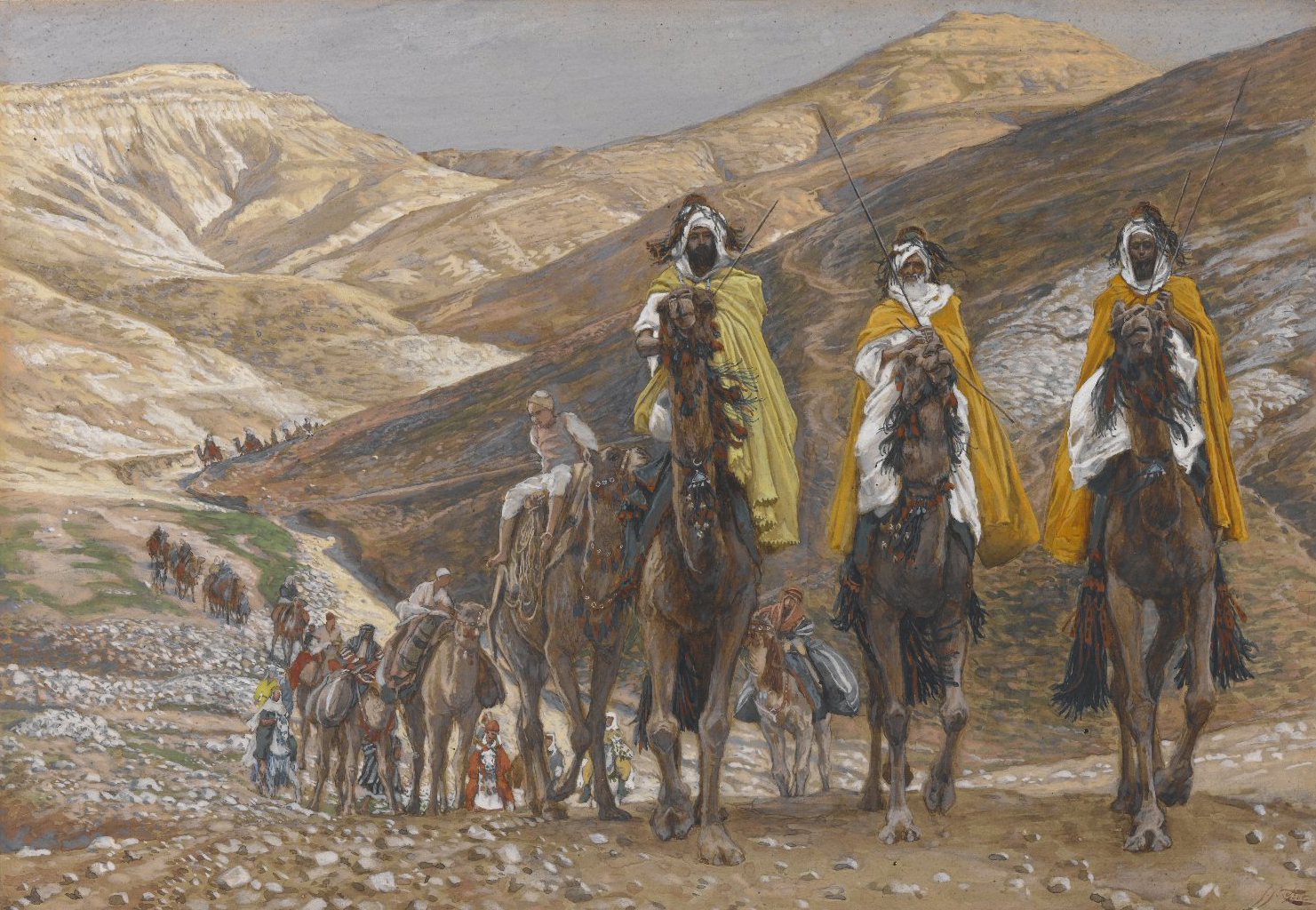
The Magi Journeying by James Tissot, c. 1890, Brooklyn Museum, New York City

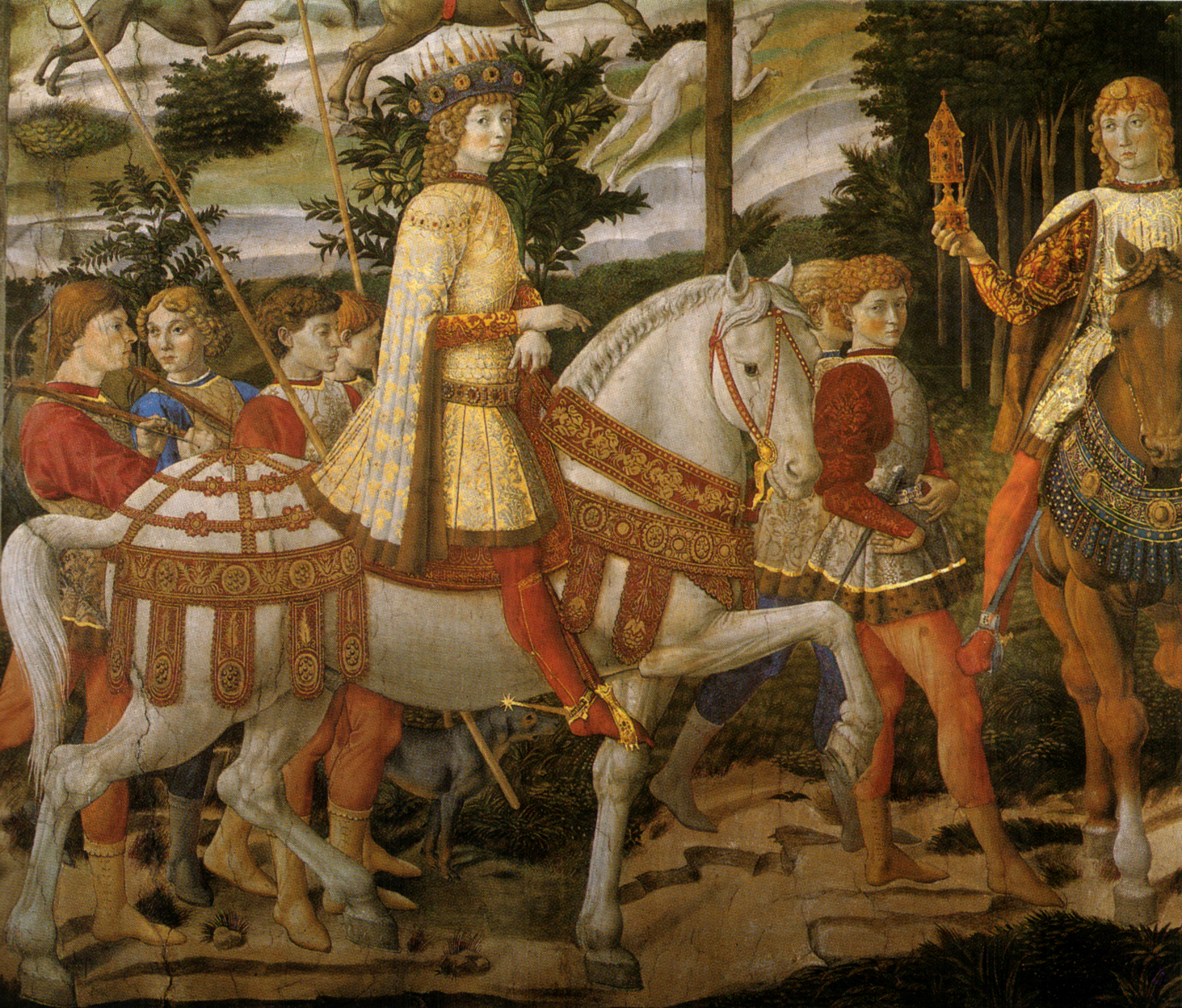
A Renaissance fresco of King Caspar in the Magi Chapel (Palazzo Medici Riccardi, Florence).

The phrase "from the east" (ἀπὸ ἀνατολῶν, apo anatolon), more literally "from the rising [of the sun]", is the only information Matthew provides about the region from which they came. The Parthian Empire, centered in Iran (Persia), stretched from eastern Syria to the fringes of India. Though the empire was tolerant of other religions, its dominant religion was Zoroastrianism, with its priestly magos class.

Although Matthew's account does not explicitly cite the motivation for their journey (other than seeing the star in the east, which they took to be the star of the King of the Jews), the apocryphal Syriac Infancy Gospel states in its third chapter that they were pursuing a prophecy from their prophet, Zoradascht (Zoroaster).

In 1995, Cambridge University professor Colin Humphreys published a study based on comet records from the Book of Han. According to this hypothesis, the Star of Bethlehem was a comet that appeared in 5 BC, the only astronomical object that would explain the three characteristics described by Matthew: a new star that moved slowly across the sky and stopped over Bethlehem with an almost vertical tail. The Magi would have first seen it in the morning sky in the east, traveled from Iraq, Iran, or Saudi Arabia for one or two months to Jerusalem, and, as they headed for Bethlehem, the comet was already in the south, seeming to guide them and stop over the place. Chinese records would confirm its visibility for more than 70 days. Previously, the triple conjunction of Jupiter and Saturn in Pisces (7 BC) would have announced, in the context of the time, a divine king in Israel, the grouping of Mars, Saturn, and Jupiter (6 BC) his power, and the comet in Capricornus (5 BC) the imminence of the birth.

According to NASA scientist Mark Matney, this comet would have guided the magi from Jerusalem to Bethlehem one morning in early June of that year, when it would have passed closest to Earth in a “temporary geosynchronous” motion, creating the illusion of “stopping” for several hours over the city where Jesus is believed to have been born.

There is an Armenian tradition identifying the "Magi of Bethlehem" as Balthasar of Arabia, Melchior of Persia, and Caspar of India. Historian John of Hildesheim relates a tradition in the ancient Silk Road city of Taxila (in present-day Punjab, Pakistan) that one of the Magi passed through the city on the way to Bethlehem.

Sebastian Brock, a historian of Christianity, has said: "It was no doubt among converts from Zoroastrianism that ... certain legends were developed around the Magi of the Gospels." And Anders Hultgård concluded that the Gospel story of the Magi was influenced by an Iranian legend concerning magi and a star, which was connected with Persian beliefs in the rise of a star predicting the birth of a ruler and with myths describing the manifestation of a divine figure in fire and light.

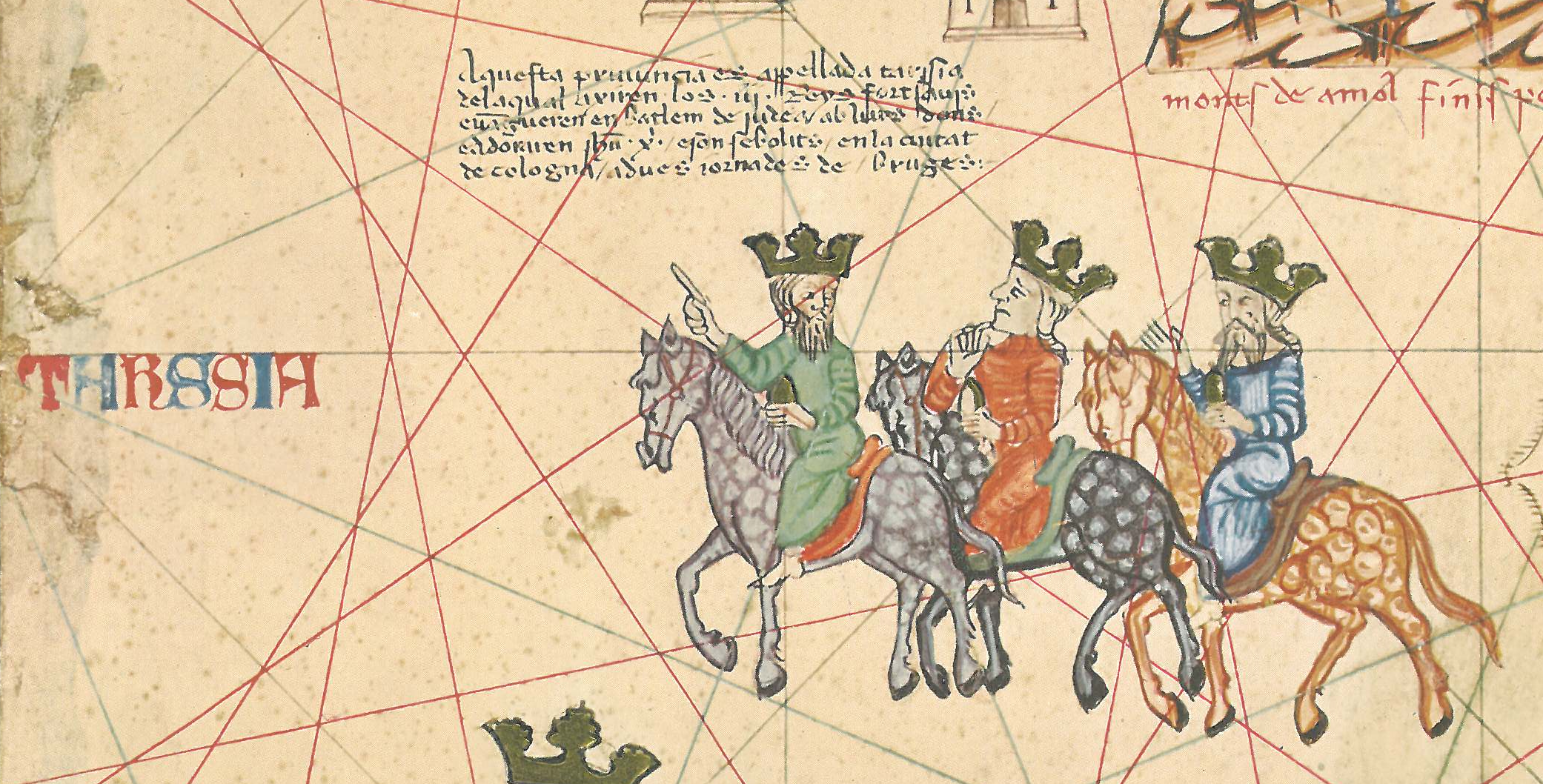
The Three Wise Kings, Catalan Atlas, 1375, fol. V: "This province is called Tarshish, from which came the Three Wise Kings, and they came to Bethlehem in Judaea with their gifts and worshipped Jesus Christ, and they are entombed in the city of Cologne two days journey from Bruges."

A model for the homage of the Magi might have been provided, it has been suggested, by the journey to Rome of King Tiridates I of Armenia, with his magi, to pay homage to the Emperor Nero, which took place in AD 66, a few years before the date assigned to the composition of the Gospel of Matthew.

There was a tradition that the Central Asian Naimans and their Christian relatives, the Keraites, were descended from the biblical Magi. This heritage passed to the Mongol dynasty of Genghis Khan when Sorghaghtani, niece of the Keraite ruler Toghrul, married Tolui, the youngest son of Genghis, and became the mother of Möngke Khan and his younger brother and successor, Kublai Khan. Toghrul became identified with the legendary Central Asian Christian king Prester John, whose Mongol descendants were sought as allies against the Muslims by contemporary European monarchs and popes. Sempad the Constable, elder brother of King Hetoum I of Cilician Armenia, visited the Mongol court in Karakorum in 1247–1250 and in 1254. He wrote a letter to Henry I King of Cyprus and Queen Stephanie (Sempad's sister) from Samarkand in 1243, in which he said: "Tanchat [Tangut, or Western Xia], which is the land from whence came the Three Kings to Bethlehem to worship the Lord Jesus which was born. And know that the power of Christ has been, and is, so great, that the people of that land are Christians; and the whole land of Chata [Khitai, or Kara-Khitai] believes those Three Kings. I have myself been in their churches and have seen pictures of Jesus Christ and the Three Kings, one offering gold, the second frankincense, and the third myrrh. And it is through those Three Kings that they believe in Christ, and that the Chan and his people have now become Christians." The legendary Christian ruler of Central Asia Prester John was reportedly a descendant of one of the Magi.

In her four volumes of visions of the life of Christ, Anne Catherine Emmerich says that the Magi came from the border between Chaldea and Elam, mentioning Ur, "Mozian" (Iraq's Maysan Province, anciently known as Mesene), "Sikdor" (Shushtar, near Susa), and a "city, whose name sounded to me something like Acajaja" (Aghajari), as well as other cities farther east.

=== Later interpretations ===
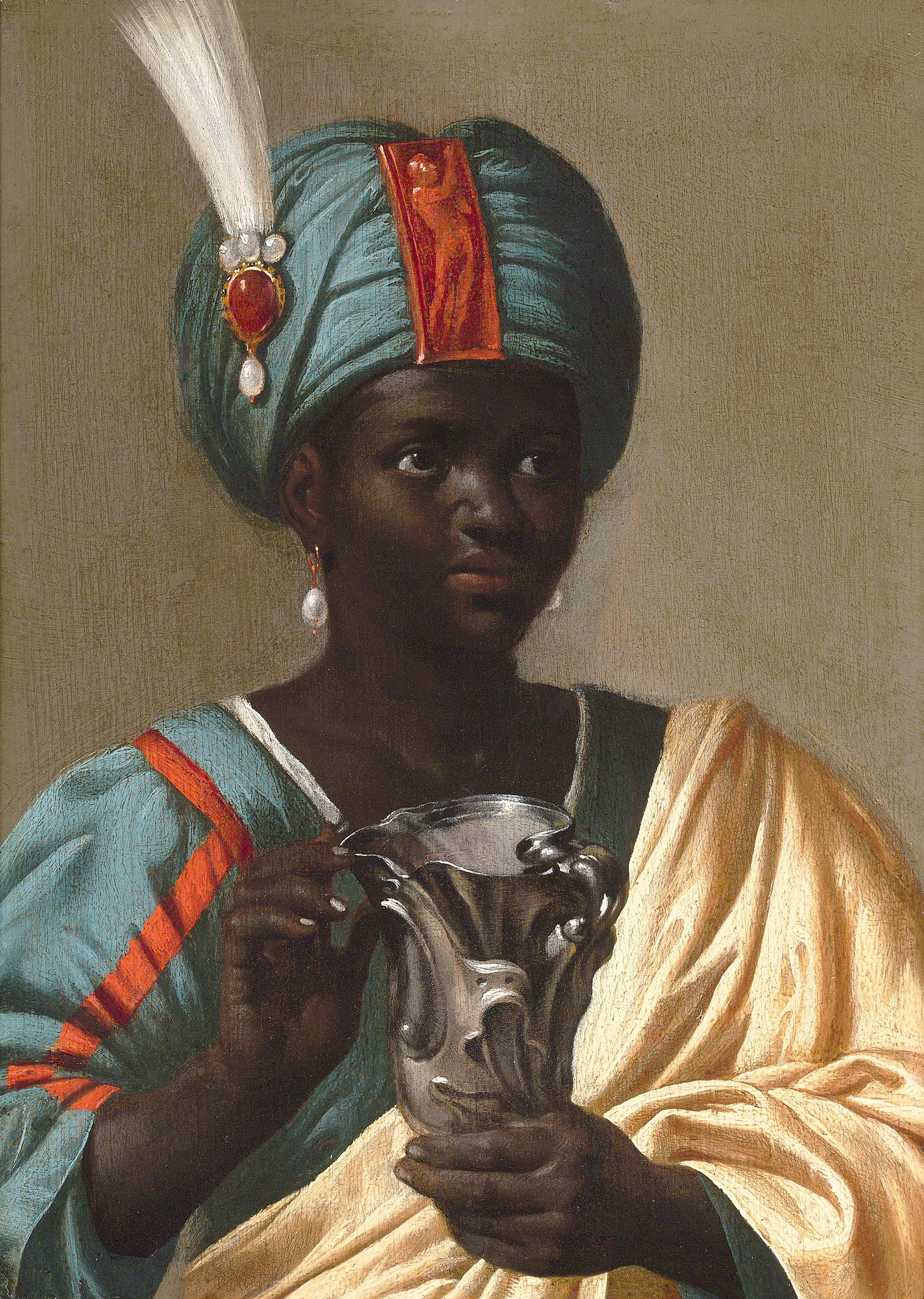
Caspar by Jan van Bijlert. Oil on panel. c. 1640 – c. 1650

Apart from their names, the three Magi developed distinct characteristics in Christian tradition, so that between them they represented the three ages of (adult) man, three geographical and cultural areas, and sometimes other concepts. In one tradition, reflected in art by at least the 14th century—for example, in the Arena Chapel by Giotto in 1305—Caspar is old, normally with a white beard, and gives the gold; he is "King of Tarsus, land of merchants" on the Mediterranean coast of modern Turkey, and is first in line to kneel to Christ. Melchior is middle-aged, giving frankincense from Arabia, and Balthazar is a young man, very often and increasingly black-skinned, with myrrh from Saba (modern southern Yemen). Their ages were often given as 60, 40 and 20 respectively, and their geographical origins were rather variable, with Balthazar increasingly coming from Aksum or other parts of Africa, and being represented accordingly.

Balthazar's blackness has been the subject of considerable recent scholarly attention; in art, it is found mostly in northern Europe, beginning from the 12th century, and becoming very common in the north by the 15th. The subject of which king is which and who brought which gift is not without some variation depending on the tradition. The gift of gold is sometimes associated with Melchior as well, and in some traditions Melchior is the oldest of the three Magi.

==== Gestures of respect ====
The Magi are described as "falling down", "kneeling", or "bowing" in the worship of Jesus (Greek: πεσόντες προσεκύνησαν, romanized: pesontes prosekynēsan, lit. 'having fallen, worshipped him'). This gesture, together with Luke's birth narrative, had an important effect on Christian religious practices. They were indicative of great respect, and typically used when venerating a king. While prostration is now rarely practised in the West, it is still relatively common in the Eastern Churches, especially during Lent. Kneeling has remained an important element of Christian worship to this day.

== Gifts of the Magi ==
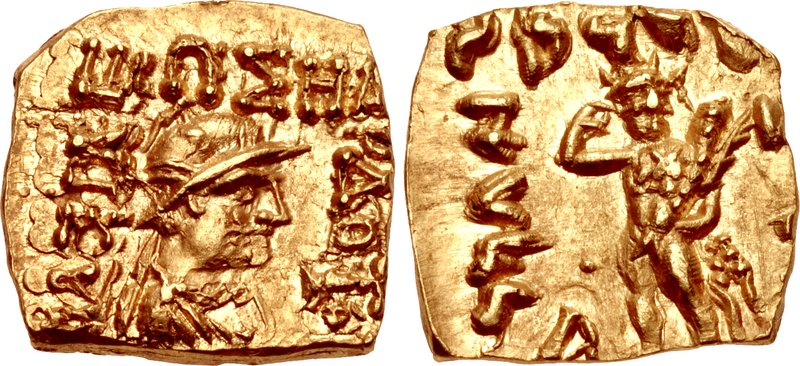
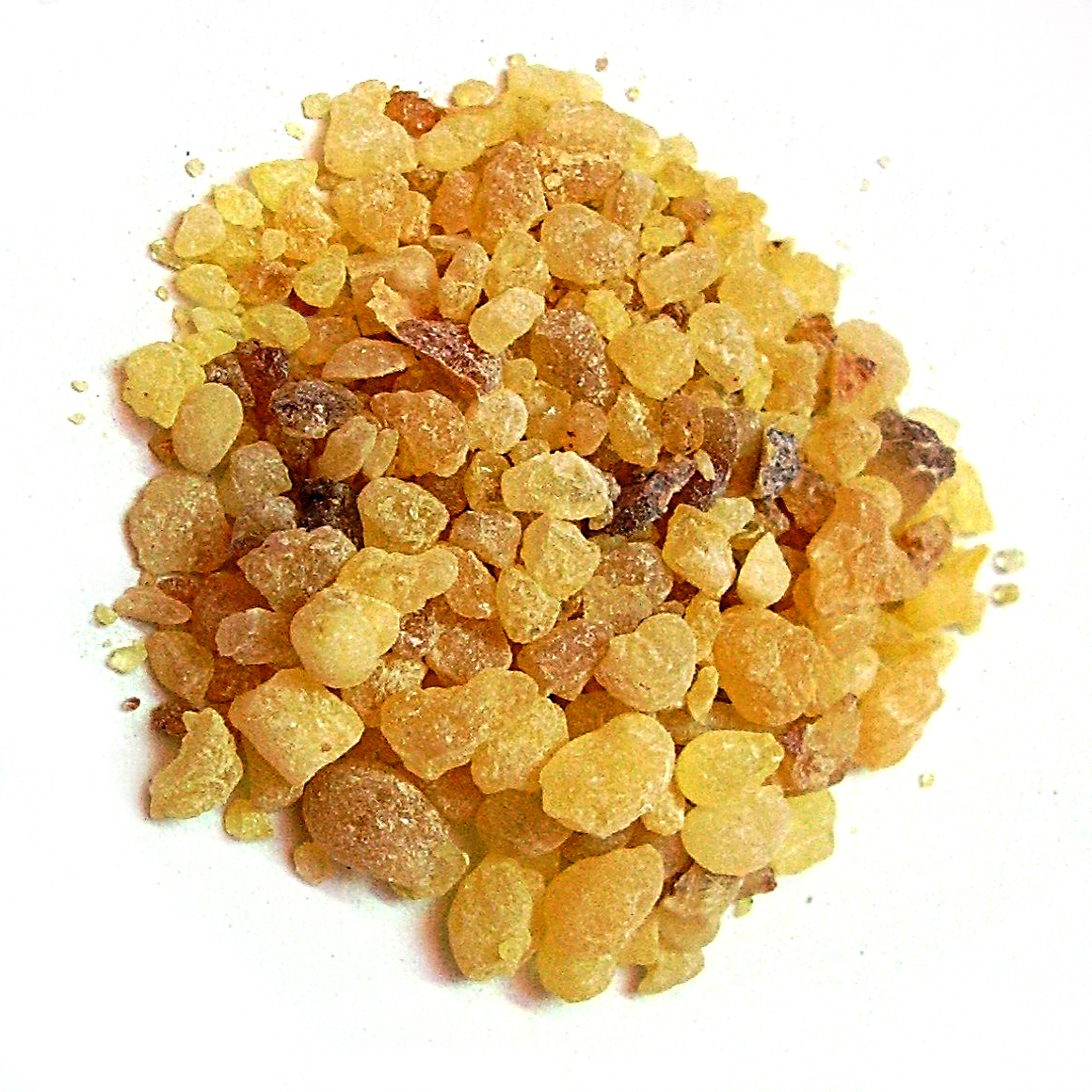
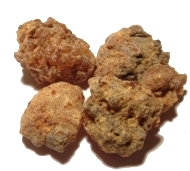
The three gifts of the magi, left to right: gold, frankincense and myrrh

Three gifts are explicitly identified in Matthew: gold, frankincense and myrrh; in Koine Greek, these are chrysós (χρυσός), líbanos (λίβανος) and smýrna (σμύρνα). There are various theories and interpretations of the meaning and symbolism of the gifts, particularly with respect to frankincense and myrrh.

The theories generally break down into two groups:

1. All three gifts are ordinary offerings and gifts given to a king. Myrrh being commonly used as an anointing oil, frankincense as a perfume, and gold as a valuable.
2. The three gifts had a spiritual meaning: gold as a symbol of kingship on earth, frankincense (an incense) as a symbol of deity, and myrrh (an embalming oil) as a symbol of death.
  *This dates back to Origen in Contra Celsum: "gold, as to a king; myrrh, as to one who was mortal; and incense, as to a God."
  *These interpretations are alluded to in the verses of the popular carol "We Three Kings" in which the magi describe their gifts. The last verse includes a summary of the interpretation: "Glorious now behold Him arise/King and God and sacrifice."
  *Sometimes this is described more generally as gold symbolising virtue, frankincense symbolising prayer, and myrrh symbolising suffering.

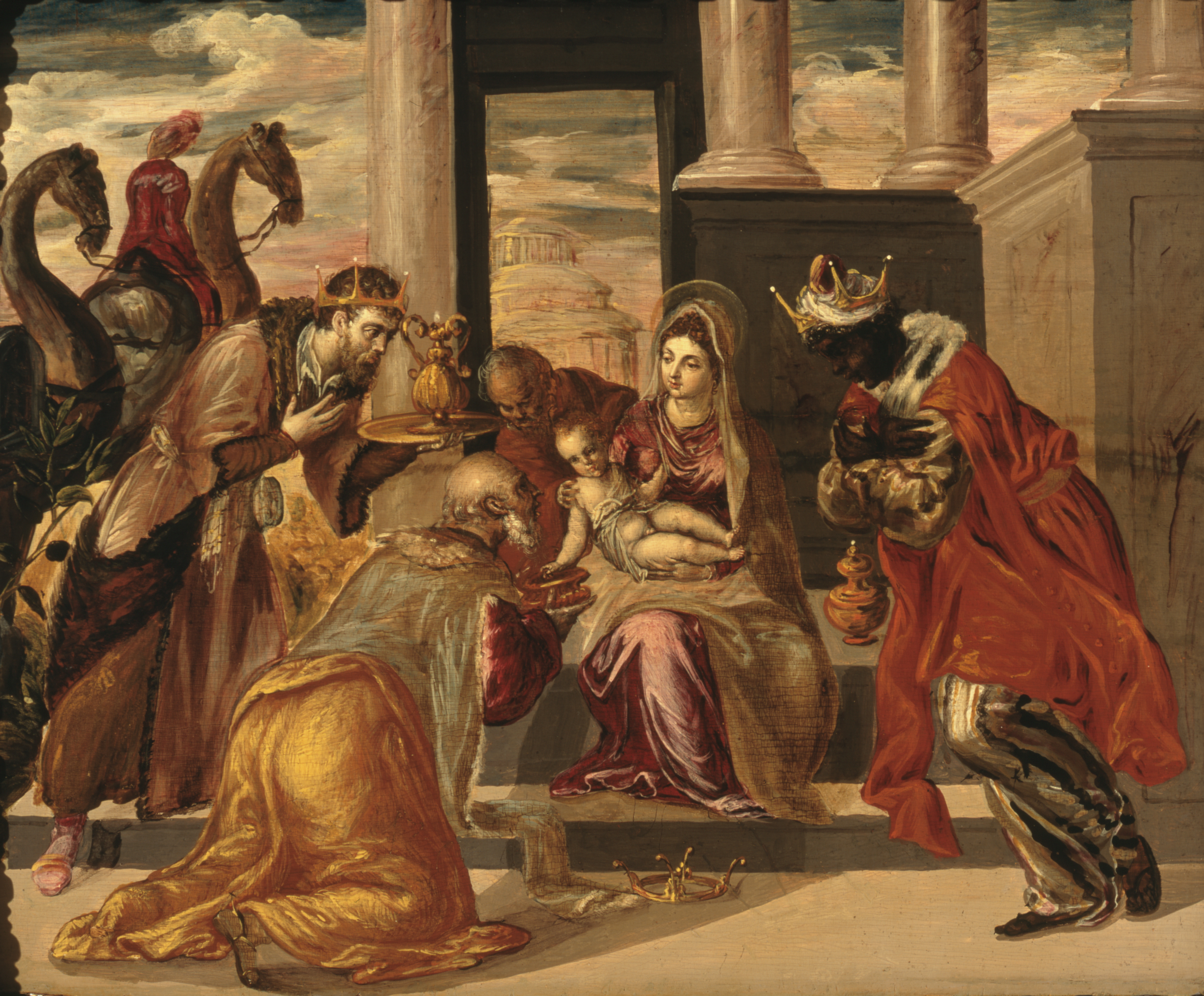
Adoración de los Reyes Magos by El Greco, 1568 (Museo Soumaya, Mexico City)

Frankincense and myrrh were burned during rituals among Egyptian, Greek and Roman societies. Ancient Egyptians used myrrh to embalm corpses and Romans burned it as a type of incense at funeral pyres. Myrrh was used as an embalming ointment and as a penitential incense in funerals and cremations until the 15th century. The "holy oil" traditionally used by the Eastern Orthodox Church for performing the sacraments of chrismation and unction is traditionally scented with myrrh, and receiving either of these sacraments is commonly referred to as "receiving the myrrh". The picture of the Magi on the 7th-century Franks Casket shows the third visitor – he who brings myrrh – with a valknut over his back, a pagan symbol referring to Death.

It has been suggested by scholars that the "gifts" were medicinal rather than precious material for tribute.

The Syrian King Seleucus I Nicator is recorded to have offered gold, frankincense and myrrh (among other items) to Apollo in his temple at Didyma near Miletus in 288/7 BC, and this may have been the precedent for the mention of these three gifts in Gospel of Matthew (2:11). It was these three gifts, it is thought, which were the chief cause for the number of the Magi becoming fixed eventually at three.

This episode can be linked to Isaiah 60 and to Psalm 72, which report gifts being given by kings, and this has played a central role in the perception of the Magi as kings, rather than as astronomer-priests. In a hymn of the late 4th-century Hispanic poet Prudentius, the three gifts have already gained their medieval interpretation as prophetic emblems of Jesus' identity, familiar in the carol "We Three Kings" by John Henry Hopkins, Jr., 1857.

John Chrysostom suggested that the gifts were fit to be given not just to a king but to God, and contrasted them with the Jews' traditional offerings of sheep and calves, and accordingly Chrysostom asserts that the Magi worshiped Jesus as God.

What subsequently happened to these gifts is never mentioned in the scripture, but several traditions have developed. One story has the gold being stolen by the two thieves who were later crucified alongside Jesus. Another tale has it being entrusted to and then misappropriated by Judas. One tradition suggests that Joseph and Mary used the gold to finance their travels when they fled Bethlehem after an angel had warned, in a dream, about King Herod's plan to kill Jesus. And another story proposes the theory that the myrrh given to them at Jesus' birth was used to anoint Jesus' body after his crucifixion.

There was a 15th-century golden case purportedly containing the Gift of the Magi housed in the Monastery of St. Paul of Mount Athos. It was donated to the monastery in the 15th century by Mara Branković, daughter of the King of Serbia Đurađ Branković, wife to the Ottoman Sultan Murat II and godmother to Mehmet II the Conqueror (of Constantinople). After the Athens earthquake of September 7, 1999, they were temporarily displayed in Athens to strengthen faith and raise money for earthquake victims. The relics were displayed in Ukraine and Belarus in Christmas of 2014, and thus left Greece for the first time since the 15th century.

According to the book The Travels of Marco Polo, gold symbolises the power over the material world as a king on earth, frankincense symbolises the power over the spiritual world as a deity, and myrrh symbolises the healing power over death.

== Religious significance and traditions ==
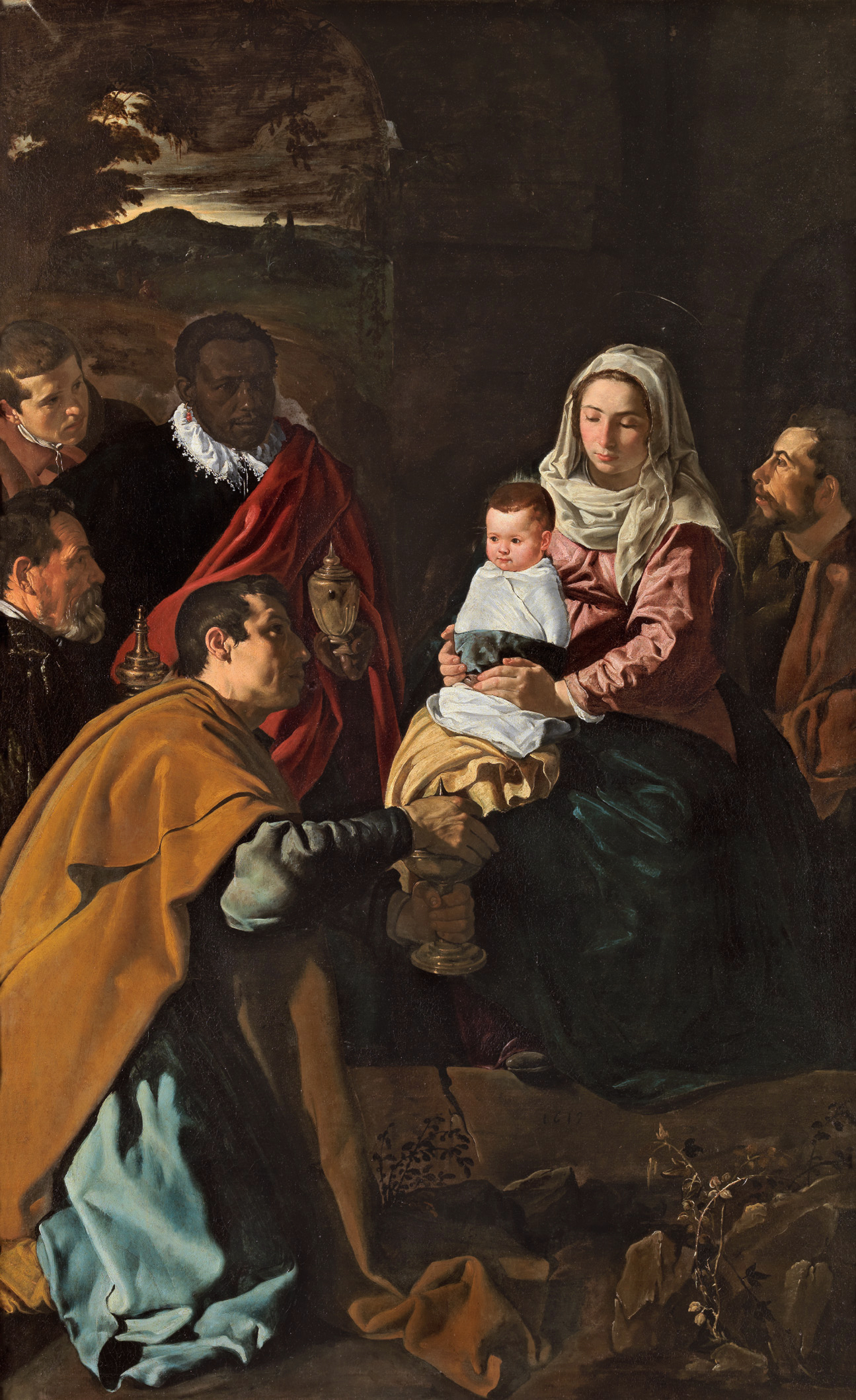
Adoration of the Magi by Velázquez (1619), Museo del Prado.

Holidays celebrating the arrival of the Magi traditionally recognise a distinction between the date of their arrival and the date of Jesus' birth. The account given in the Gospel of Matthew does not state that they were present on the night of the birth; in the Gospel of Luke, Joseph and Mary remain in Bethlehem until it is time for Jesus' dedication in Jerusalem, after which they return to their home in Nazareth.

The visit of the Magi is commemorated in most Western Christian churches separately from Christmas. The visit of the Magi is part of the Epiphany on 6 January, which concludes the Twelve Days of Christmas; on that date the Magi are also celebrated as saints.

The Eastern Orthodox celebrate the visit of the Magi on the same date as their Christmas, which is either 25 December or 7 January, depending on if they follow the Revised Julian calendar or the Julian calendar.

One story in Syriac Christianity in the era of the late Roman Empire and early post-Islamic conquest period, the Revelation of the Magi, indicates that the Magi arrived in April (rather than January). It also implies the Magi arrived before Jesus's birth, while Mary was still pregnant, yet nevertheless a celestial child of the transformed Star of Bethlehem was able to commission them, suggesting that Jesus could be in multiple places at once.

The Quran does not contain Matthew's episode of the Magi. However, the Persian Muslim encyclopedist al-Tabari, writing in the ninth century, gives the familiar symbolism of the gifts of the Magi, citing the late seventh century Persian-Yemenite writer Wahb ibn Munabbih.

=== Spanish and Hispanic customs ===
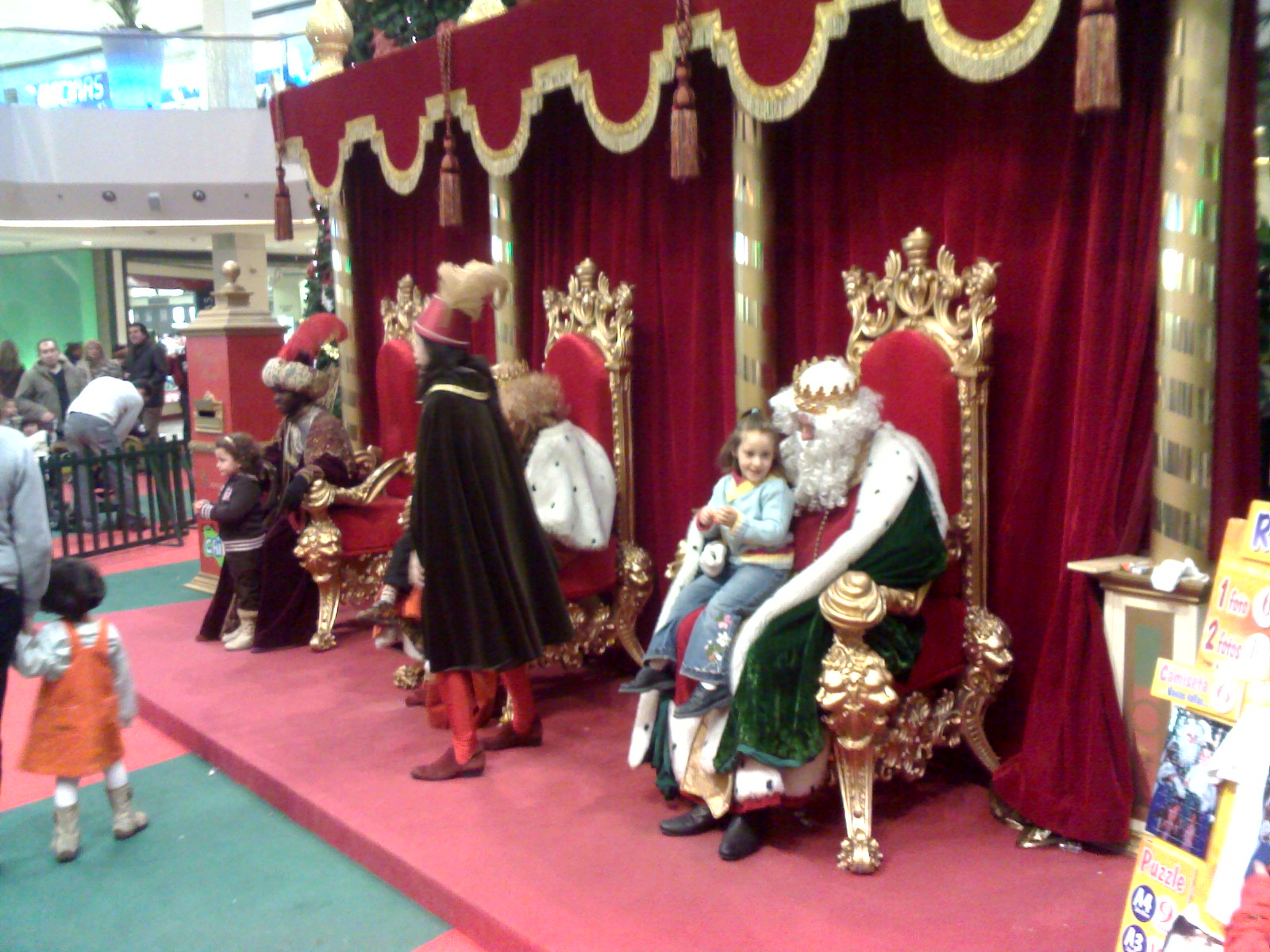
The Three Wise Men receiving children at a shopping mall in Spain. Letters with gift requests are left in the letterbox on the left-hand side.

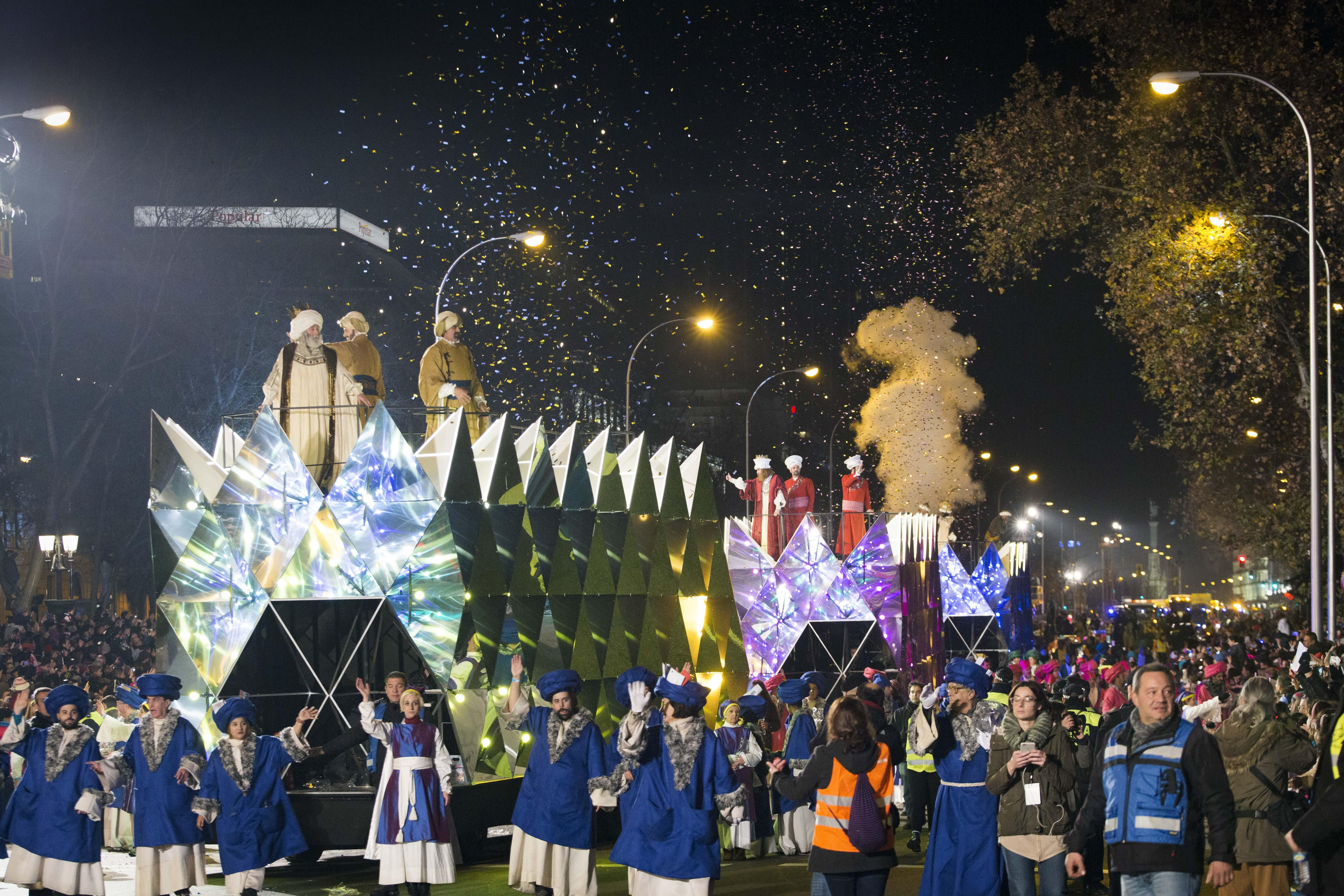
Cavalcade of Magi in Madrid.

In much of the Spanish-speaking world, the Three Kings (Los Reyes Magos de Oriente, Los Tres Reyes Magos, or simply Los Reyes Magos) receive letters from children and so bring them gifts on the morning of 6 January. In Spain, each one of the Magi is supposed to represent a different continent: Europe (Melchior), Asia (Caspar) and Africa (Balthasar). According to the tradition, the Magi come from the Orient on their camels to visit the houses of all the children, much like Sinterklaas and Santa Claus with his reindeer elsewhere.

Almost every Spanish city or town organises cabalgatas in the evening of 5 January (Epiphany Eve), in which the kings and their pages parade and throw sweets to the children (and parents) in attendance. The cavalcade of the three kings in Alcoy claims to be the longest-running in the world, having started in 1886. The Mystery Play of the Three Magic Kings is also presented on Epiphany Eve. There is also a King cake.

In Spain, due to the lack of a black population until recently, the role of Balthazar has often been played by an actor in blackface; this practice has been criticised in the 21st century.

Not only in Spain, but also in Argentina, Mexico, Paraguay, and Uruguay, there is a long tradition of children receiving presents by the three Reyes Magos on the night of 5 January (Epiphany Eve) or on the morning of 6 January (Epiphany day or Día de Reyes), because it is believed that this is the day in which the Magi arrived bearing gifts for the Christ child. In most Latin American countries children also cut grass or greenery on 5 January and fill a box or their shoes with the cuttings for the Kings' camels. They then place the box or their shoes under their bed or beside the Christmas tree. On Epiphany morning the children will find the grass gone from their shoes or box and replaced with candy and other small, sweet treats.

In Spain and most Latin American countries, which are predominantly Roman Catholic, the Christmas Season starts on 8 December (the Feast of the Immaculate Conception, also known as day of the Virgin Mary) and ends with the last hour of 6 January, Día de Reyes. In the U.S. territory of Puerto Rico, however, there are eight more days of celebration called las octavitas (the little eight days). The Catholic Church defines the liturgical season of Christmastide from 25 December to Candlemas on 2 February.

In the Philippines, beliefs concerning the Three Kings (Filipino: Tatlóng Haring Mago, lit. "Three Magi Kings"; shortened to Tatlóng Harì or Spanish Tres Reyes) follows Hispanic influence, with the Feast of the Epiphany considered by many Filipinos as the traditional end of their Christmas season. The tradition of the Three Kings' cabalgata is presently done only in a few areas, such as the old city of Intramuros in Manila, and the island of Marinduque. Another dying custom is for children to leave their shoes out on Epiphany Eve, so that they may receive gifts of sweets and money from the Three Kings. With the arrival of American culture in the early 20th century, the Three Kings as gift-bringers have been largely been supplanted in urban areas by Santa Claus, surviving in the greeting "Happy Three Kings!" and the surname Tatlóngharì. The Three Kings are also enshrined as the patron saints of the National Shrine of Virgen La Divina Pastora in Gapan, Nueva Ecija.

=== Central Europe ===
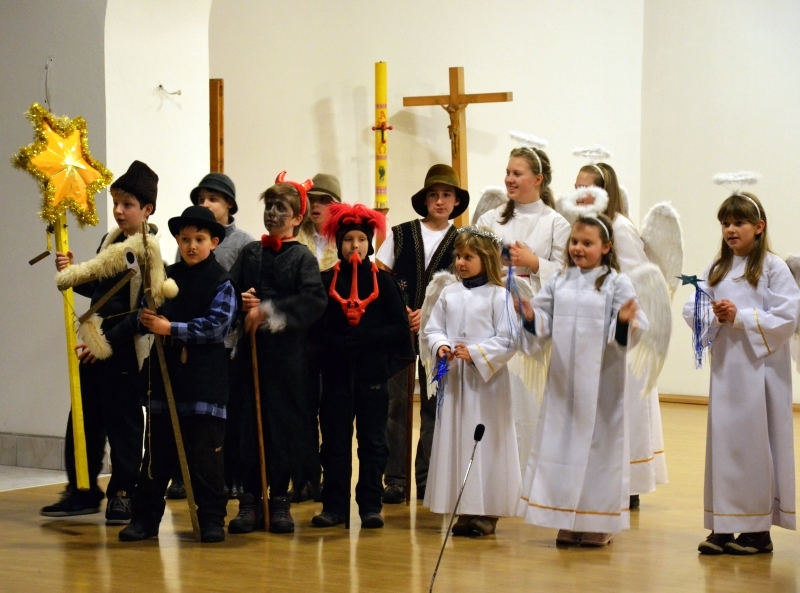
Sternsinger – Christmas carolers in Sanok, Poland

A tradition in Poland, the Czech Republic, Slovakia, Slovenia, and German-speaking Catholic areas is the writing of the three kings' initials in chalk (Note: C+M+B, C M B, G+M+B, K+M+B, in those areas where Caspar is spelled Kaspar or Gašper.) above the main door of Catholic homes. The traditional rite of blessing of chalk attests to this by the prayer:

"Bless, + O Lord God, this creature, chalk, and let it be a help to mankind. Grant that those who will use it with faith in your most holy name, and with it inscribe on the doors of their homes the names of your saints, Casper, Melchior, and Baltassar, may through their merits and intercession enjoy health in body and protection of soul; through Christ our Lord."

This is a new year's blessing for the occupants and the initials also are believed to also stand for "Christus mansionem benedicat" ("May/Let Christ Bless This House"). Depending on the city or town, this will be happen sometime between Christmas and the Epiphany, with most municipalities celebrating closer to the Epiphany. Also in Catholic parts of the German-speaking world, these markings are made by the Sternsinger (literally, "star singers") – a group of children dressed up as the magi. The Sternsinger carry a star representing the one followed by the biblical magi and sing Christmas carols as they go door to door, such as "Stern über Bethlehem". After singing, the children write the three kings' initials on the door frame in exchange for charitable donations. Each year, German and Austrian dioceses pick one charity towards which all Sternsinger donations nationwide will be contributed.

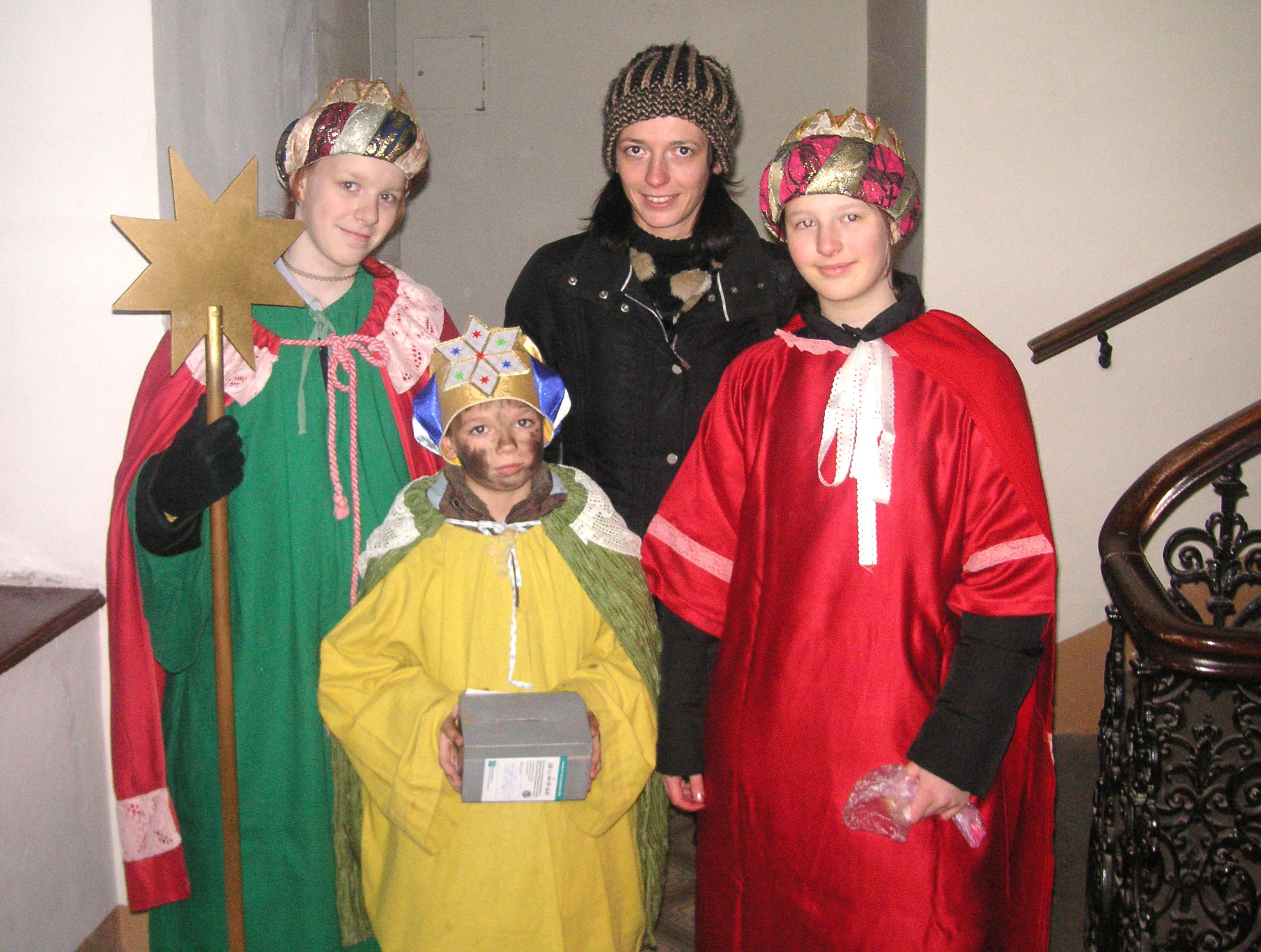
Sternsinger in Vienna, Austria

Traditionally, one child in the Sternsinger group is said to represent Baltasar from Africa and so, that child typically wears blackface makeup. Beginning in the 2020s, organizers of Sternsinger events in Germany and Austria recommend against using makeup to depict different skin colors. In the past, photographs of German politicians together with children in blackface have caused a stir in English-language press. Moreover, Afro-Germans have written that this use of blackface is a missed opportunity to be truly inclusive of Afro-Germans in German-speaking communities and contribute to the equation of "blackness" with "foreignness" and "otherness" in German culture.

In 2010, Epiphany was made a holiday in Poland, thus reviving a pre-World War II tradition. Since 2011, celebrations with biblical costuming have taken place throughout the country. For example, in Warsaw there are processions from Plac Zamkowy down Krakowskie Przedmieście to Plac Piłsudskiego.

=== Cake ===
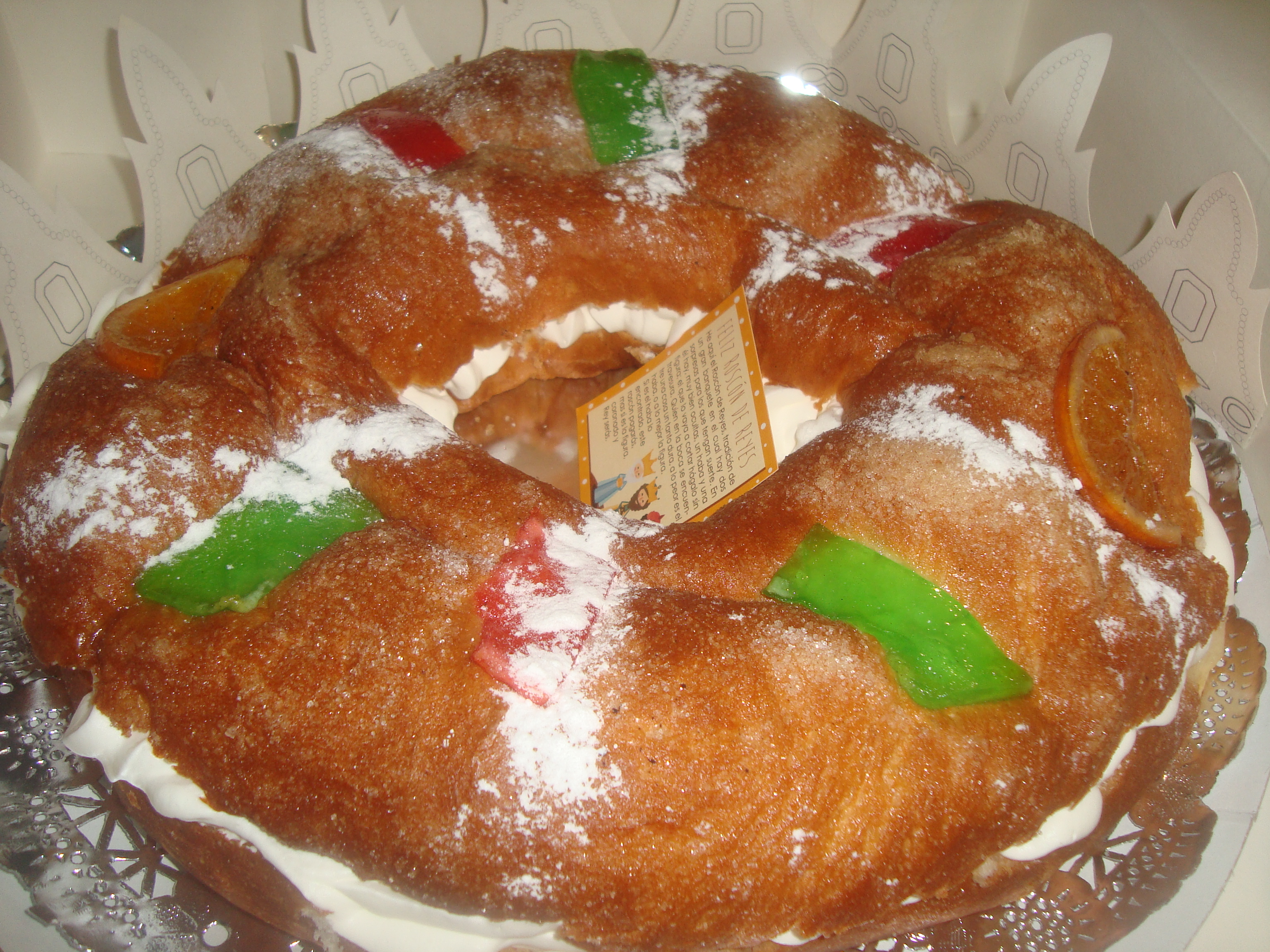
A roscón de reyes from Castellón with whipped cream.

In Spain and Portugal, a ring-shaped cake (in Portuguese: bolo-rei) contains both a small figurine of one of the Magi (or another surprise depending on the region) and a dry broad bean. The one who gets the figurine is "crowned" (with a crown made of cardboard or paper), but whoever gets the bean has to pay the value of the cake to the person who originally bought it. In Mexico they also have the same ring-shaped cake Rosca de Reyes (Kings Bagel or Thread) with figurines inside it. Whoever gets a figurine is supposed to organise and be the host of the family celebration for the Candelaria feast on February 2.

In France and Belgium, a cake containing a small figure of the baby Jesus, known as the "broad bean", is shared within the family. Whoever gets the bean is crowned king for the remainder of the holiday and wears a cardboard crown purchased with the cake. A similar practice is common in many areas of Switzerland, but the figurine is a miniature king. The practice is known as tirer les Rois (Drawing the Kings). A queen is sometimes also chosen.

In New Orleans, Louisiana, parts of southern Texas, and surrounding regions, a similar ring-shaped cake known as a "King Cake" traditionally becomes available in bakeries from Epiphany to Mardi Gras. The baby Jesus figurine is inserted into the cake from underneath, and the person who gets the slice with the figurine is expected to buy or bake the next King Cake. There is wide variation among the types of pastry that may be called a King Cake, but most are a baked cinnamon-flavoured twisted dough with thin frosting and additional sugar on top in the traditional Mardi Gras colours of gold, green and purple. To prevent accidental injury or choking, the baby Jesus figurine is frequently not inserted into the cake at the bakery, but included in the packaging for optional use by the buyer to insert it themselves. Mardi Gras-style beads and doubloons may be included as well.

=== Martyrdom traditions ===
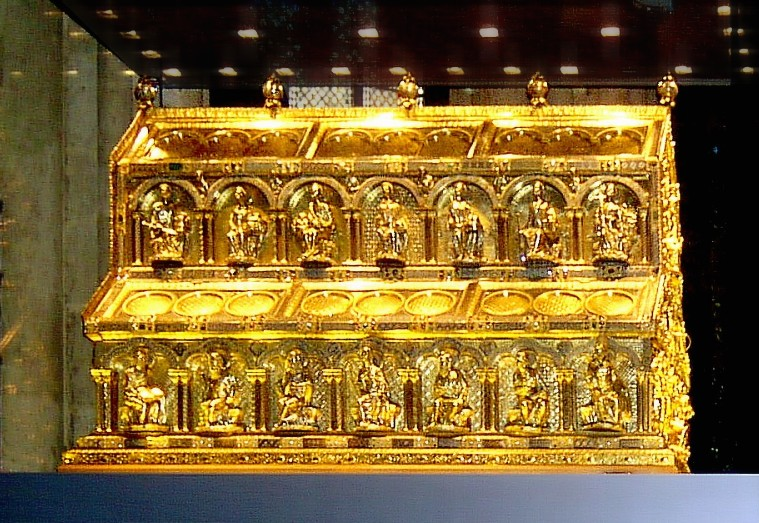
The Shrine of the Three Kings in Cologne Cathedral, Germany, c. 1200

Christian scriptures record nothing about the biblical Magi after reporting that they returned to their own country. (Note: Matthew 2:12 uses the feminine singular noun, χώραν, noting one country, territory or region of origin.) The Chronicon of Dexter, a martyrological text ascribed to Flavius Lucius Dexter, the bishop of Barcelona under Theodosius the Great (379–396), describes "the martyrdom of the holy kings, the three Magi, Gaspar, Balthassar, and Melchior who adored Christ" in "Arabia Felix, in the city of Sessania of the Adrumeti". First appearing in 1610, the Chronicon of Dexter was immensely popular throughout the 17th century, particularly in Spain. However, by the 19th century, certain historians and Catholic officials in Rome declared the work a pious forgery.

Another competing tradition, most likely originating from Germany, likewise asserts that the biblical Magi were martyred for their faith, albeit without further details.

=== Tombs ===
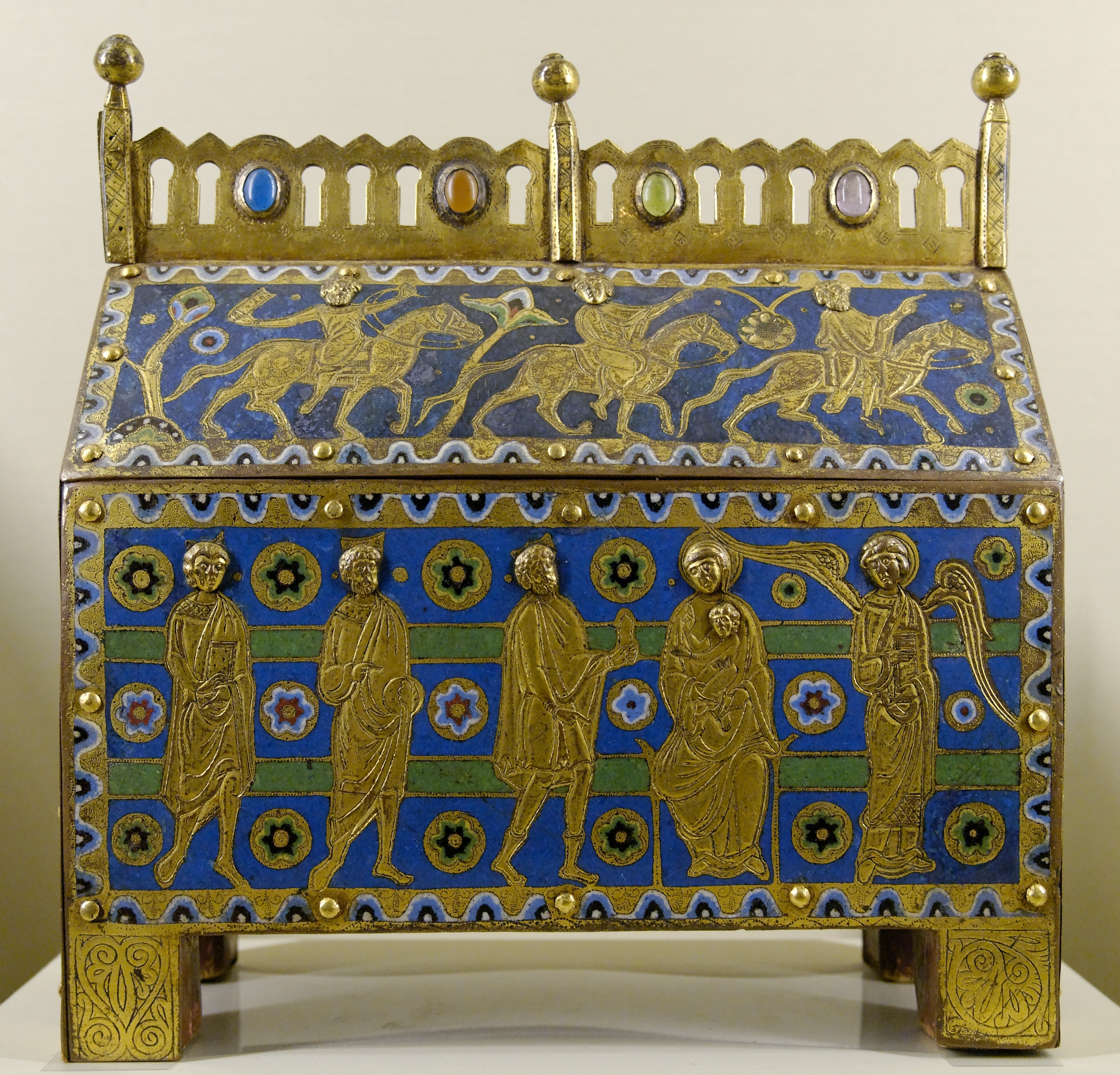
Journey of the Magi (top) and Adoration of the Magi (side) on a Limoges champlevé chasse, c. 1200 (Musée de Cluny, Paris)

There are several traditions as to where the remains of the Magi are located, none of which have been verified or given veracity by secular historians.

Marco Polo claimed that he was shown the three tombs of the Magi at Saveh, south of Tehran in present day Iran, in the 1270s:

In Persia is the city of Saba, from which the Three Magi set out when they went to worship Jesus Christ; and in this city they are buried, in three very large and beautiful monuments, side by side. And above them there is a square building, carefully kept. The bodies are still entire, with the hair and beard remaining.

— Marco Polo, The Book of the Million, book I, chapter 13

Paul William Roberts provides some modern-day corroboration of this possibility in his book Journey of the Magi.

The bones of the Magi are allegedly contained at the Shrine of the Three Kings at Cologne Cathedral in Germany. According to tradition, they were first discovered by Helena, mother of Constantine the Great, on her famous pilgrimage to Palestine and the Holy Lands in 326–28. She took the remains to the church of Hagia Sophia in Constantinople; in 344, they were transferred to Milan—in some accounts by the city's bishop, Eustorgius I—where they were interred in a special tomb beneath its basilica. In 1162, following the conquest of the city by Holy Roman Emperor Frederick I, the Magi's remains were transferred to Cologne Cathedral at the behest of its archbishop, Rainald von Dassel. The translation of the Magi's relics to Cologne is commemorated liturgically every year on 24 July. In response to growing pilgrimages to the relics, von Dassel's successor, Philipp von Hochstaden, commissioned the current Shrine of the Three Kings in the late 12th century, which remains widely visited and venerated. The Milanese treated the fragments of masonry from their now-empty tomb as secondary relics, which were widely distributed around the region, including southern France; this accounts for the frequency with which the Magi appear on chasse reliquaries in Limoges enamel produced in the region. The city continues to celebrate its part in the tradition by holding a medieval costume parade every 6 January.

A version of this account is conveyed by 14th-century cleric John of Hildesheim in Historia Trium Regum ("History of the Three Kings"), which begins with the journey of Helena to Jerusalem, where she recovered the True Cross and other relics:

Queen Helen... began to think greatly of the bodies of these three kings, and she arrayed herself, and accompanied by many attendants, went into the Land of Ind... after she had found the bodies of Melchior, Balthazar, and Gaspar, Queen Helen put them into one chest and ornamented it with great riches, and she brought them into Constantinople... and laid them in a church that is called Saint Sophia.

== Cultural depictions ==
=== Visual art ===
Adoration of the Magi, tondo by Fra Angelico and Filippo Lippi, c. 1450 (NGA, Washington)

Most depictions of the Magi in European art focus on their visit to Jesus. Also depicted, if less often, were the Journey of the Magi, the Magi before Herod, and the Dream of the Magi. In Byzantine art they are depicted as Persians, wearing trousers and phrygian caps. Crowns appear from the 10th century. Despite being saints, they are very often shown without halos, perhaps to avoid distracting attention from either their crowns or the halos of the Holy Family. Sometimes only the lead king, kneeling to Christ, has a halo the two others lack, probably indicating that the two behind had not yet performed the act of worship that would ensure their status as saints. Medieval artists also allegorised the theme to represent the three ages of man. Beginning in the 12th century, and very often by the 15th, the Kings also represent the three parts of the known (pre-Columbian) world in Western art, especially in Northern Europe. Balthasar is thus represented as a young African or Moor, and Caspar may be depicted with distinctly Oriental features.

An early Anglo-Saxon depiction survives on the Franks Casket (early 7th century, whale's bone carving), the only Christian scene, which is combined with pagan and classical imagery. In its composition it follows the oriental style, which renders a courtly scene, with the Virgin and Christ facing the spectator, while the Magi devoutly approach from the (left) side. Even amongst non-Christians who had heard of the Christian story of the Magi, the motif was quite popular, since the Magi had endured a long journey and were generous. Instead of an angel, the picture places a swan-like bird, perhaps interpretable as the hero's fylgja (a protecting spirit, and shapeshifter).

Austrian artist Gottfried Helnwein depicted a more controversial tableau in his painting, Epiphany I: Adoration of the Magi (1996). Intended to represent the "many connections between the Third Reich and the Christian churches in Austria and Germany", Nazi officers in uniform stand around an Aryan Madonna. The Christ toddler who stands on Mary's lap resembles Adolf Hitler.

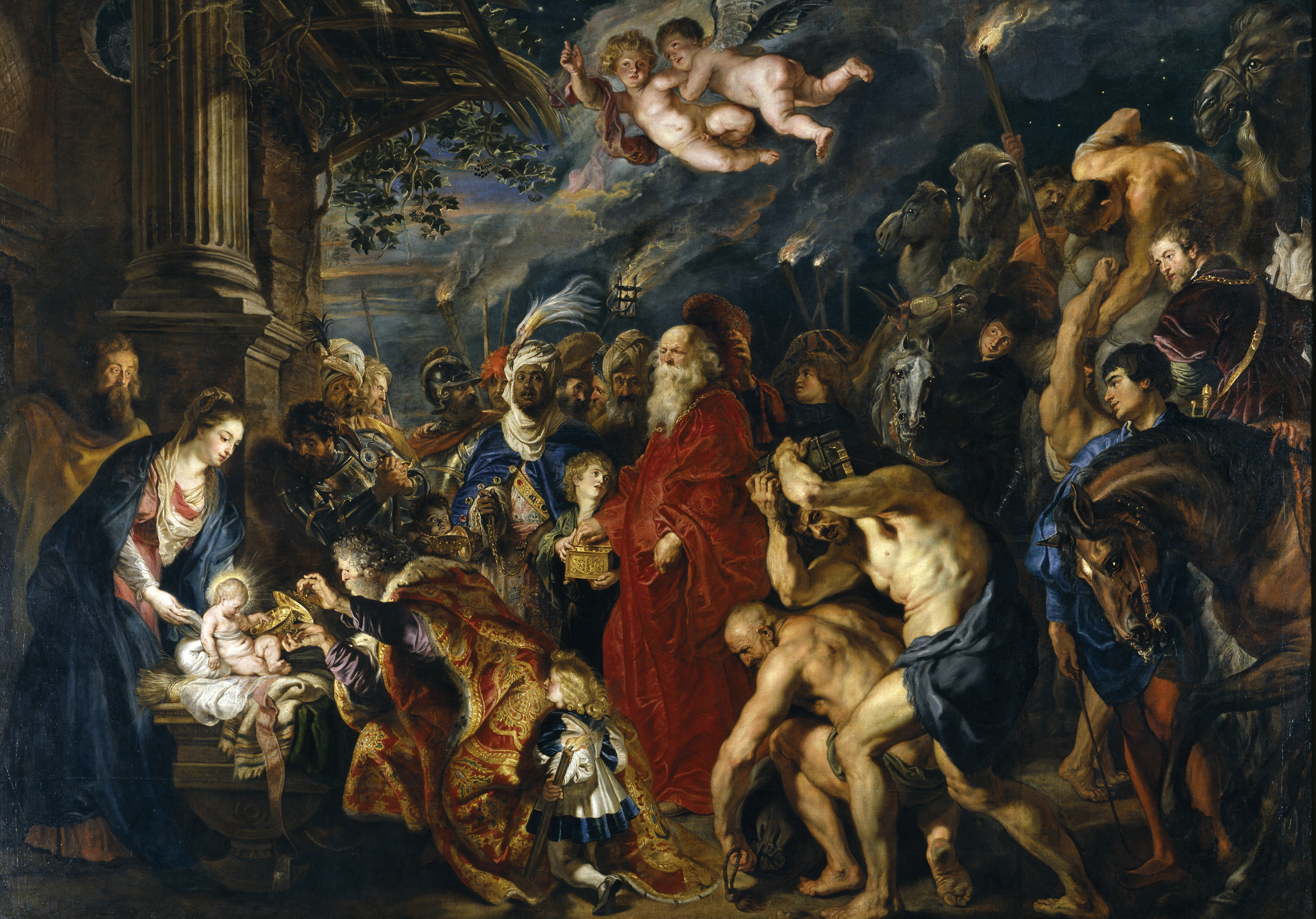
The Adoration of the Magi, Peter Paul Rubens, 1609 and 1628–29

More generally they appear in popular Nativity scenes and other Christmas decorations that have their origins in the Neapolitan variety of the Italian presepio or Nativity crèche.

=== Music ===
Some Christmas carols refer to the biblical Magi or Three Kings, especially hymns meant to be sung by the star singers, such as "Stern über Bethlehem". Peter Cornelius composed a song cycle, Weihnachtslieder, Op. 8, which contains the song "Die Könige" (The Kings), which became popular in an English choral arrangement, "The Three Kings". Balthazar, Caspar, and Melchior are also featured in Gian Carlo Menotti's 1951 opera Amahl and the Night Visitors. The popular carol "We Three Kings" is another example. Johann Sebastian Bach's Cantata #65 "Sie werden aus Saba alle kommen" ("All they from Saba shall come") also tells about the Wise Men, based on the Old Testament prophesy found in Isaiah 60:6 ("A multitude of camels shall cover you, the young camels of Midian and Ephah; all those from Sheba shall come. They shall bring gold and frankincense, and shall proclaim the praise of the Lord.")

=== Television & Cinema ===
Numerous films have included these characters in some scenes depicting the Nativity, from The Life and Passion of Jesus Christ (1903) to The Star (2017). In 2003, the Spanish animated film The 3 Wise Men was released, directed by Antonio Navarro and nominated for the Goya Awards.

The 1936 film The Three Wise Guys is a humorous story about 3 criminals who help a girl give birth in a barn in Bethlehem, Pennsylvania and give up a treasure in order to help her. The 1979 Monty Python's film Life of Brian opening scene is a parody of the visit of the Magi.

In the anime Neon Genesis Evangelion, the organization NERV has three supercomputers that help run the organization that are called the Magi and are named Balthasar, Melchior, and Caspar.

=== Literature ===
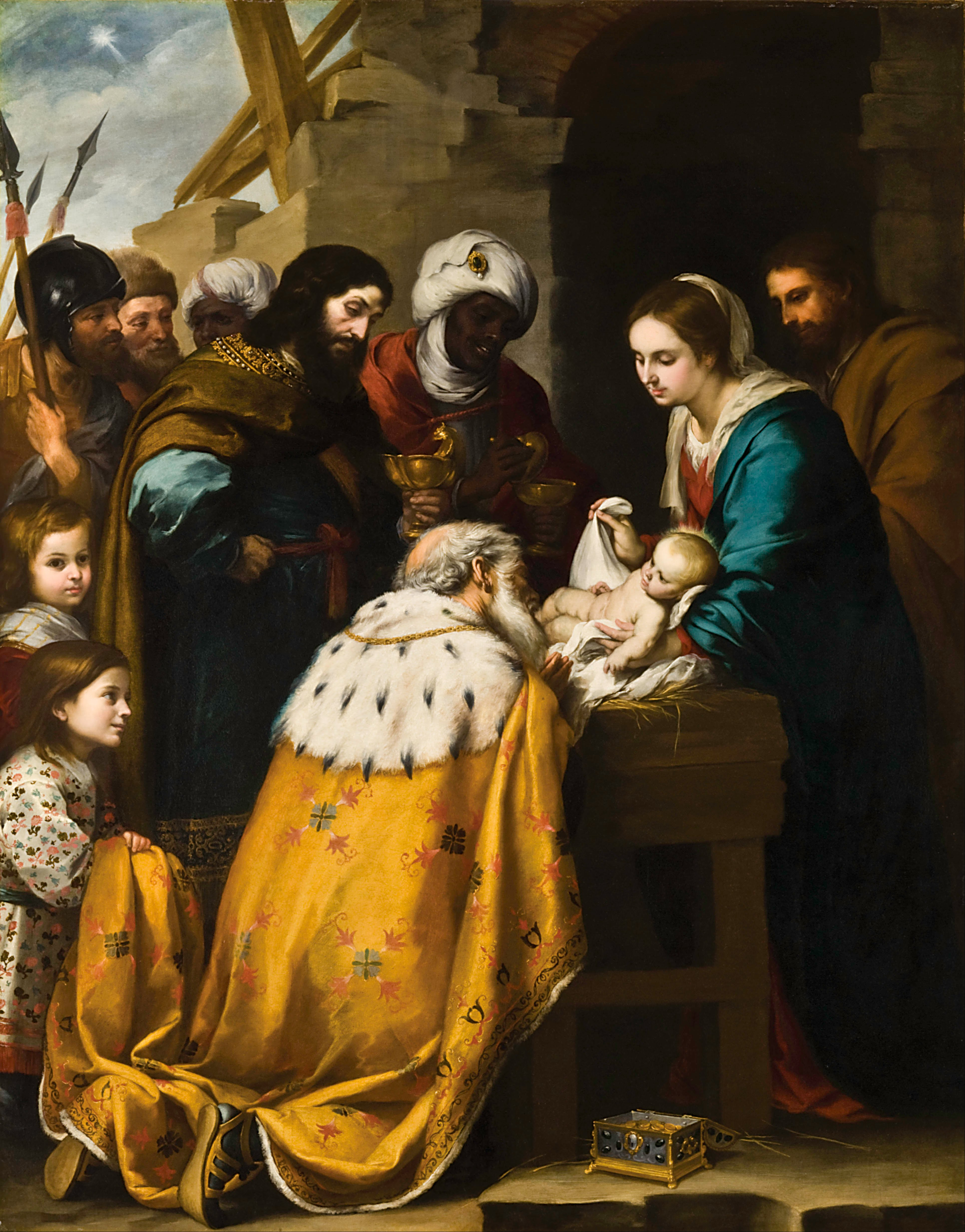
Adoration of the Magi by Bartolomé Esteban Murillo, c. 1655 (Toledo Museum of Art, Ohio)

- Henry van Dyke's 1895 novella The Other Wise Man tells the story of Artaban, a fourth magus whose mission of kindness delays his arrival in Bethlehem by one day, missing Jesus and his parents who by then had fled to Egypt. The rest of the plot revolves around Artaban traveling the world throughout Jesus's 33 years on Earth and of the protagonist's multiple attempts to pay homage to the Son of God.
- The first part of Lewis Wallace's 1880 novel Ben-Hur tells the story of the birth of Christ from Balthasar's point of view. Here Balthasar comes from Egypt and is joined by Melchior, a Hindu, and Gaspar, a Greek. Balthasar remains a recurring character throughout the novel.
- O. Henry's 1905 short story The Gift of the Magi tells of an impoverished couple named Jim and Della Dillingham Young sacrificing their prized possessions to buy each other Christmas gifts. Della sells her long brown hair to buy a platinum fob chain to go with Jim's pocket watch, only to learn that he had sold it to buy ornamental combs for her hair. In addition to the eponymous magi, the text also mentions the Queen of Sheba and King Solomon. The narrator ends the story by claiming that (in comparison between the biblical figures' wealth with the Dillingham Youngs' possessions) those who sacrifice the things they value for the people they love are as wise as the magi themselves.
- T.S. Eliot's 1927 poem Journey of the Magi is told from an aged king's point of view.

== See also ==
- Astronomy
- Christian views on astrology
- Essenes
- List of names for the biblical nameless
- Saint Nicholas
- Santi Re Magi, Milan

== Bibliography ==
- Giffords, Gloria Fraser, Sanctuaries of Earth, Stone, and Light: The Churches of Northern New Spain, 1530–1821, 2007, University of Arizona Press, ISBN 0816525897, 9780816525898, google books
- Metzger, Bruce, New Testament Studies: Philological, Versional, and Patristic, Volume 10, 1980, BRILL, ISBN 9004061630, 9789004061637.
- Penny, Nicholas, National Gallery Catalogues (new series): The Sixteenth Century Italian Paintings, Volume II, Venice 1540–1600, 2008, National Gallery Publications Ltd, ISBN 1857099133
- Schiller, Gertud, Iconography of Christian Art, Vol. I, 1971 (English trans from German), Lund Humphries, London, ISBN 0853312702

Adoration of the Wise Men Life of Jesus
Preceded by Star of Bethlehem	New Testament; Events	Succeeded by Flight into Egypt
