= August =

Eighth month in the Julian and Gregorian calendars

<<	August					>>
Su	Mo	Tu	We	Th	Fr	Sa
						1
2	3	4	5	6	7	8
9	10	11	12	13	14	15
16	17	18	19	20	21	22
23	24	25	26	27	28	29
30	31
2026

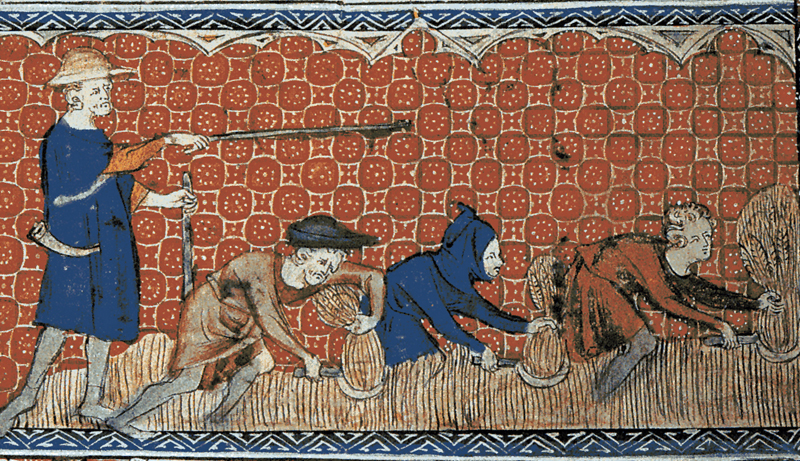
Depiction of harvesting in the August calendar page of the Queen Mary Psalter (fol. 78v), ca. 1310

In recent decades, the number of warm temperature records in August has outpaced cold temperature records over a growing portion of Earth's surface.

Chart shows changes in global average temperature annually in August of each year

August is the eighth month of the year in the Julian and Gregorian calendars. Its length is 31 days.

In the Southern Hemisphere, August is the seasonal equivalent of February in the Northern Hemisphere. In the Northern Hemisphere, August falls in summer. In the Southern Hemisphere, the month falls during winter. In many European countries, August is the holiday month for most workers. Numerous religious holidays occurred during August in ancient Rome.

Certain meteor showers take place in August. The Kappa Cygnids occur in August, with yearly dates varying. The Alpha Capricornids meteor shower occurs as early as 10 July and ends around 10 August. The Southern Delta Aquariids occur from mid-July to mid-August, with the peak usually around 28–29 July. The Perseids, a major meteor shower, typically takes place between 17 July and 24 August, with the peak days varying yearly. The star cluster of Messier 30 is best observed around August.

Among the aborigines of the Canary Islands, especially among the Guanches of Tenerife, the month of August received the name of Beñesmer or Beñesmen, which was also the harvest festival held that month.

The month was originally named Sextilis in Latin because it was the 6th month in the original ten-month Roman calendar under Romulus in 753 BC, with March being the first month of the year. About 700 BC, it became the eighth month when January and February were added to the year before March by King Numa Pompilius, who also gave it 29 days. Julius Caesar added two days when he created the Julian calendar in 46 BC (AUC 708), giving it its modern length of 31 days.

In 8 BC, the month was renamed in honor of Emperor Augustus. According to a Senatus consultum quoted by Macrobius, he chose this month because it was the time of several of his great triumphs, including the conquest of Egypt. Commonly repeated lore has it that August has 31 days because Augustus wanted his month to match the length of Julius Caesar's July, but this is an invention of the 13th century scholar Johannes de Sacrobosco. Sextilis had 31 days before it was renamed. It was not chosen for its length.

== Symbols ==
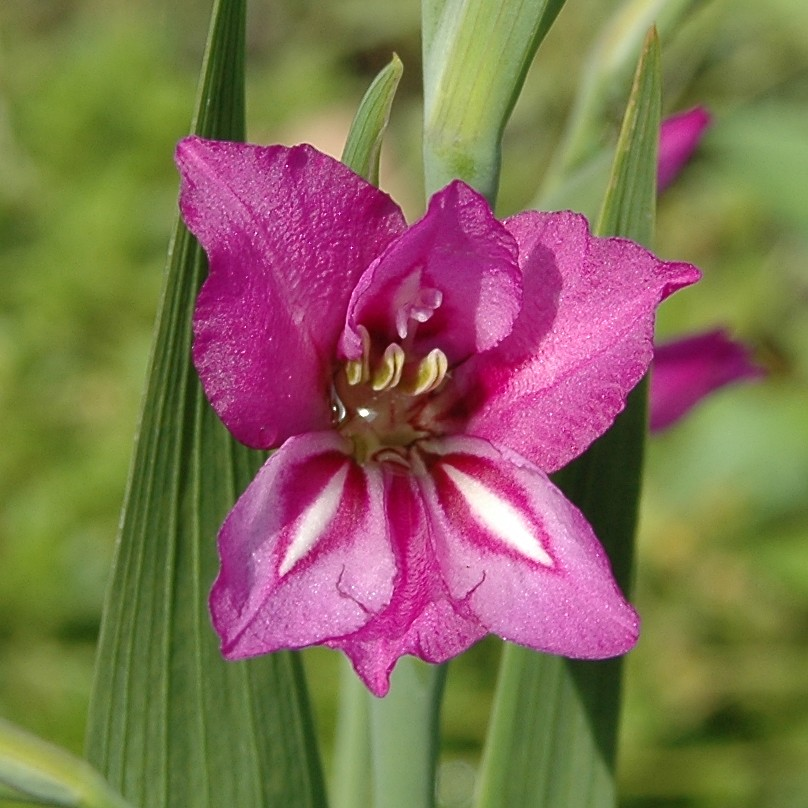
Gladiolus

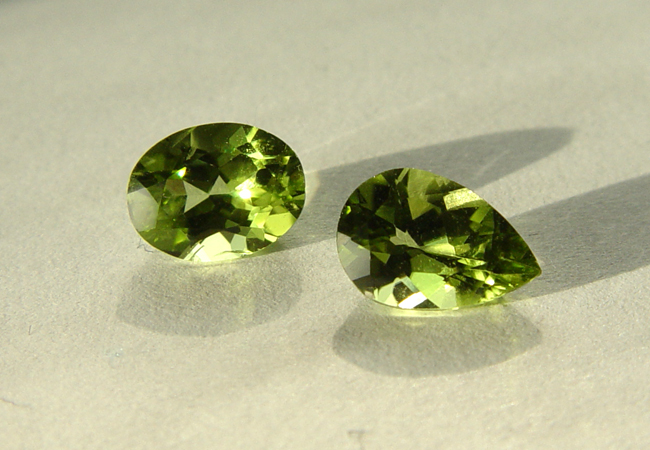
Peridot gemstones

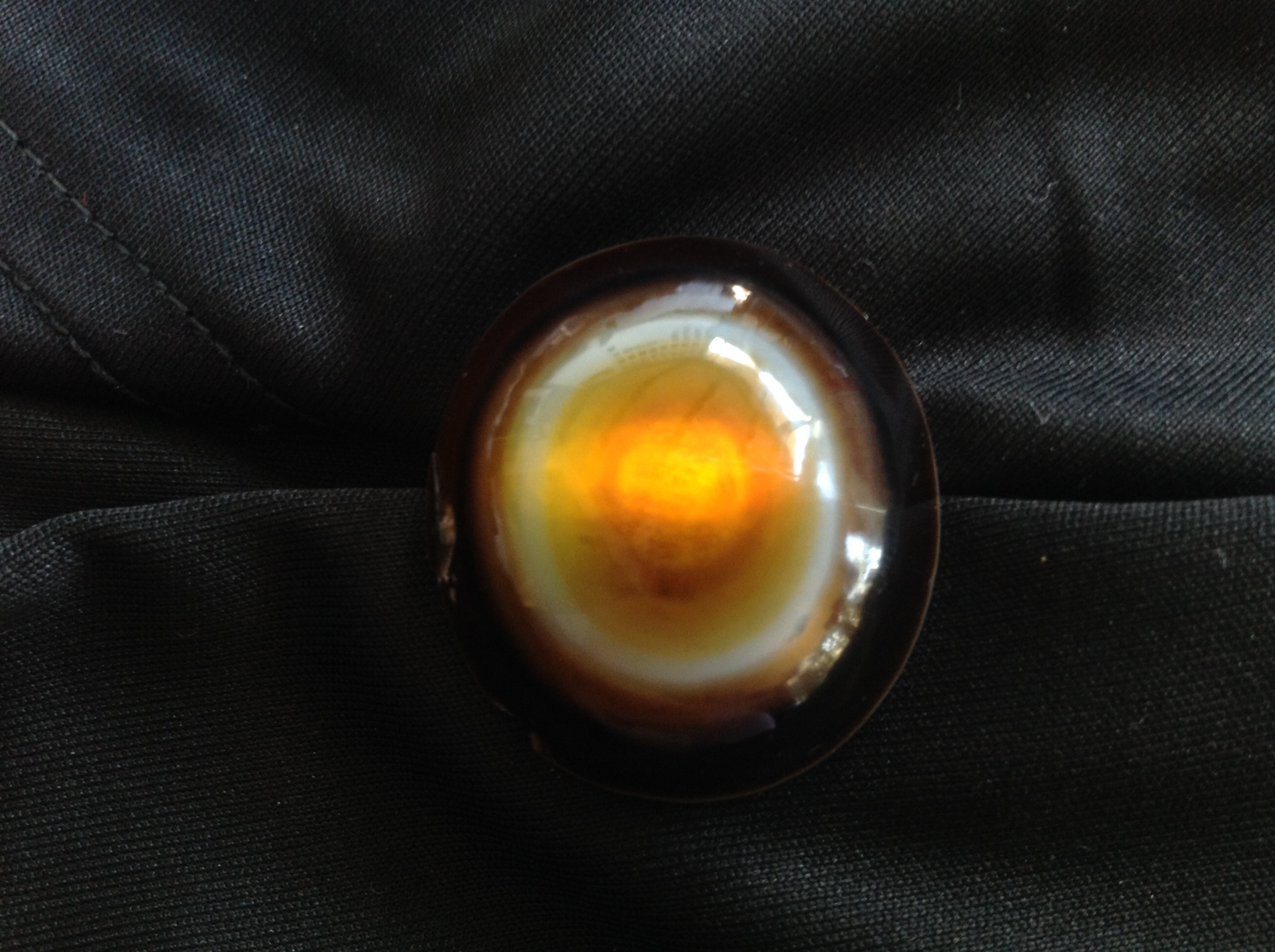
Sardonyx stone

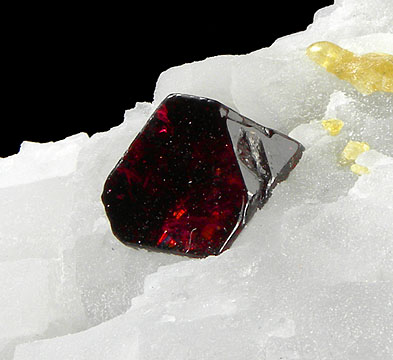
Red spinel on calcite

August's birthstones are the peridot, sardonyx, and spinel.

Its birth flower is the gladiolus or poppy, meaning beauty, strength of character, love, marriage and family. The Western zodiac signs are Leo (until 22 August) and Virgo (from 23 August onward).

== Observances ==
This list does not necessarily imply official status or general observance.

=== Non-Gregorian: 2026 dates ===
(All Baha'i, Islamic, and Jewish observances begin at sundown before the listed date and end at sundown on the date in question unless otherwise noted.)

- List of observances set by the Bahá'í calendar
- List of observances set by the Chinese calendar
- List of observances set by the Hebrew calendar
- List of observances set by the Islamic calendar
- List of observances set by the Solar Hijri calendar

=== Month-long ===
- Women's Month (South Africa)
- American Adventures Month (celebrates vacationing in the Americas)
- Children's Eye Health and Safety Month
- Digestive Tract Paralysis (DTP) Month
- Get Ready for Kindergarten Month
- Happiness Happens Month
- National Language Month or Buwan ng Wika (Philippines)
- National History Month or Buwan ng Kasaysayan (Philippines)
- Neurosurgery Outreach Month
- Psoriasis Awareness Month
- Spinal Muscular Atrophy Awareness Month
- What Will Be Your Legacy Month

==== United States month-long ====
- National Black Business Month
- National Children's Vision and Learning Month
- National Immunization Awareness Month
- National Princess Peach Month
- National Water Quality Month
- National Win with Civility Month

===== Food months in the United States =====
- National Catfish Month
- National Dippin' Dots Month
- Family meals Month
- National Goat Cheese Month.
- National Panini Month
- Peach Month
- Sandwich Month

=== Moveable Gregorian ===
- National Science Week (Australia)
- Ugly Potato Day (Canada)
- See also Movable Western Christian observances
- See also Movable Eastern Christian observances

==== Second to last Sunday in July and the following two weeks ====
- Construction Holiday (Quebec)

==== 1st Saturday ====
- Food Day (Canada)
- Mead Day (United States)
- National Mustard Day (United States)

==== 1st Sunday ====
- Air Force Day (Ukraine)
- American Family Day (Arizona, United States)
- Children's Day (Uruguay)
- Friendship Day (United States)
- International Forgiveness Day
- Railway Workers' Day (Russia)

==== First full week of August ====
- National Farmer's Market Week (United States)

==== 1st Monday ====
- August Public Holiday (Ireland)
- Children's Day (Tuvalu)
- Civic Holiday (Canada)
  - British Columbia Day (British Columbia, Canada)
  - Natal Day (Nova Scotia, Canada)
  - New Brunswick Day (New Brunswick, Canada)
  - Saskatchewan Day (Saskatchewan, Canada
  - Terry Fox Day (Manitoba, Canada)
- Commerce Day (Iceland)
- Emancipation Day (Anguilla, Antigua, The Bahamas, British Virgin Islands, Dominica, Grenada, Saint Kitts and Nevis)
- Farmer's Day (Zambia)
- Kadooment Day (Barbados)
- Labor Day (Samoa)
- National Day (Jamaica)
- Picnic Day (Northern Territory, Australia)
- Somers' Day (Bermuda)
- Youth Day (Kiribati)

==== 1st Tuesday ====
- National Night Out (United States)

==== 1st Friday ====
- International Beer Day

==== 2nd Saturday ====
- Sports Day (Russia)

==== Sunday on or closest to 9 August ====
- National Peacekeepers' Day (Canada)

==== 2nd Sunday ====
- Children's Day (Argentina, Chile, Uruguay)
- Father's Day (Brazil, Samoa)
- Melon Day (Turkmenistan)
- Navy Day (Bulgaria)
- National Day (Singapore)

==== 2nd Monday ====
- Heroes' Day (Zimbabwe)
- Victory Day (Hawaii and Rhode Island, United States)

==== 2nd Tuesday ====
- Defence Forces Day (Zimbabwe)

==== 3rd Saturday ====
- National Honey Bee Day (United States)

==== 3rd Sunday ====
- Children's Day (Argentina, Peru)
- Grandparents Day (Hong Kong)

==== 3rd Monday ====
- Discovery Day (Yukon, Canada)
- Day of Hearts (Haarlem and Amsterdam, Netherlands)
- National Mourning Day (Bangladesh)

==== 3rd Friday ====
- Hawaii Admission Day (Hawaii, United States)

==== Last Thursday ====
- National Burger Day (United Kingdom)

==== Last Sunday ====
- Coal Miner's Day (some former Soviet Union countries)
- National Grandparents Day (Taiwan)

==== Last Monday ====
- Father's Day (South Sudan)
- National Heroes' Day (Philippines)
- Liberation Day (Hong Kong)
- Late Summer Bank Holiday (England, Northern Ireland and Wales)

==== Last Friday ====
- Wear it Purple Day (Australia)

=== Fixed Gregorian ===
- Season of Emancipation (Barbados) (14 April to 23 August)
- International Clown Week (1–7 August)
- World Breastfeeding Week (1–7 August)
- 1 August
  - Armed Forces Day (China)
  - Armed Forces Day (Lebanon)
  - Azerbaijani Language and Alphabet Day (Azerbaijan)
  - Emancipation Day (Barbados, Guyana, Jamaica, Saint Vincent and the Grenadines, St. Lucia, Trinidad and Tobago, Turks and Caicos Islands)
  - Imbolc (Neopaganism, Southern Hemisphere only)
  - Lammas (England, Scotland, Neopaganism, Northern Hemisphere only)
  - Lughnasadh (Gaels, Ireland, Scotland, Neopaganism, Northern Hemisphere only)
  - Minden Day (United Kingdom)
  - National Day (Benin)
  - National Milkshake Day (United States)
  - Official Birthday and Coronation Day of the King of Tonga (Tonga)
  - Pachamama Raymi (Quechua people in Ecuador and Peru)
  - Parents' Day (Democratic Republic of the Congo)
  - Procession of the Cross and the beginning of Dormition Fast (Eastern Orthodoxy)
  - Statehood Day (Colorado)
  - Swiss National Day (Switzerland)
  - Victory Day (Cambodia, Laos, Vietnam)
  - World Scout Scarf Day
  - Yorkshire Day (Yorkshire, England)
- August 2
  - Airmobile Forces Day (Ukraine)
  - Day of Azerbaijani cinema (Azerbaijan)
  - Our Lady of the Angels Day (Costa Rica)
  - Paratroopers Day (Russia)
  - Republic Day (North Macedonia)
- August 3
  - Anniversary of the Killing of Pidjiguiti (Guinea-Bissau)
  - Armed Forces Day (Equatorial Guinea)
  - Esther Day (United States)
  - Flag Day (Venezuela)
  - Independence Day (Niger)
    - Arbor Day (Niger)
  - National Guard Day (Venezuela)
  - National Watermelon Day (United States)
  - National White Wine Day (United States)
- August 4
  - Coast Guard Day (United States)
  - Constitution Day (Cook Islands)
  - Matica slovenská Day (Slovakia)
  - Revolution Day (Burkina Faso)
- August 5
  - Dedication of the Basilica of St Mary Major (Catholic Church)
  - Independence Day (Burkina Faso)
  - National Underwear Day (United States)
  - Victory and Homeland Thanksgiving Day and the Day of Croatian defenders (Croatia)
- August 6
  - Feast of the Transfiguration
  - Sheikh Zayed bin Sultan Al Nahyan's Accession Day. (United Arab Emirates)
  - Hiroshima Peace Memorial Ceremony (Hiroshima, Japan)
  - Independence Day (Bolivia)
  - Independence Day (Jamaica)
  - Russian Railway Troops Day (Russia)
- August 7
  - Assyrian Martyrs Day (Assyrian community)
  - Battle of Boyacá Day (Colombia)
  - Emancipation Day (Saint Kitts and Nevis)
  - Independence Day (Ivory Coast)
  - Republic Day (Ivory Coast)
  - Youth Day (Kiribati)
- August 8
  - Ceasefire Day (Iraqi Kurdistan)
  - Father's Day (Taiwan)
  - Happiness Happens Day (International observance)
  - International Cat Day
  - Namesday of Queen Silvia of Sweden, (Sweden)
  - Nane Nane Day (Tanzania)
  - Signal Troops Day (Ukraine)
- August 9
  - Battle of Gangut Day (Russia)
  - International Day of the World's Indigenous People (United Nations)
  - National Day (Singapore)
  - National Women's Day (South Africa)
  - Remembrance for Radbod, King of the Frisians (The Troth)
- 10 August
  - Argentine Air Force Day (Argentina)
  - Constitution Day (Anguilla)
  - Declaration of Independence of Quito (Ecuador)
  - International Biodiesel Day
  - National S'more Day (United States)
- 11 August
  - Flag Day (Pakistan)
  - Independence Day (Chad)
  - Mountain Day (Japan)
- 12 August
  - Glorious Twelfth (United Kingdom)
  - HM the Queen's Birthday and National Mother's Day (Thailand)
  - International Youth Day (United Nations)
  - Russian Railway Troops Day (Russia)
  - Sea Org Day (Scientology)
  - World Elephant Day
- 13 August
  - Independence Day (Central African Republic)
  - International Lefthanders Day
  - National Filet Mignon Day (United States)
  - Women's Day (Tunisia)
- 14 August
  - Anniversary Day (Tristan da Cunha)
  - Commemoration of Wadi al-Dahab (Morocco)
  - Day of the Defenders of the Fatherland (Abkhazia)
  - Engineer's Day (Dominican Republic)
  - Falklands Day (Falkland Islands)
  - Independence Day (Pakistan)
  - National Creamsicle Day (United States)
  - National Navajo Code Talkers Day (United States)
  - Pramuka Day (Indonesia)
- 15 August
  - Feast Day of the Assumption of Mary (Catholic holy days of obligation, a public holiday in many countries.)
    - Ferragosto (Italy)
    - Māras (Latvia)
    - Mother's Day (Antwerp and Costa Rica)
    - National Acadian Day (Acadians)
    - Virgin of Candelaria, patron of the Canary Islands. (Tenerife, Spain)
  - Feast of the Dormition of the Theotokos (Eastern Orthodox, Oriental Orthodox and Eastern Catholic Churches)
    - Navy Day (Romania)
  - Armed Forces Day (Poland)
  - The first day of Flooding of the Nile, or Wafaa El-Nil (Egypt and Coptic Church)
  - The main day of Bon Festival (Japan), and its related observances:
    - Awa Dance Festival (Tokushima Prefecture)
  - Constitution Day (Equatorial Guinea)
  - End-of-war Memorial Day, when the National Memorial Service for War Dead is held. (Japan)
  - Founding of Asunción (Paraguay)
  - Independence Day (Korea)
    - Gwangbokjeol (South Korea)
    - Jogukhaebangui nal, "Fatherland Liberation Day" (North Korea)
  - Independence Day (India)
  - Independence Day (Republic of the Congo)
  - International Apostrophe Day
  - National Day (Liechtenstein)
  - Victory over Japan Day (United Kingdom)
  - National Lemon Meringue Pie Day (United States)
- 16 August
  - Bennington Battle Day (Vermont, United States)
  - Children's Day (Paraguay)
  - Gozan no Okuribi (Kyoto, Japan)
  - The first day of the Independence Days (Gabon)
  - National Airborne Day (United States)
  - National Rum Day (United States)
  - Restoration Day (Dominican Republic)
- 17 August
  - The Birthday of Marcus Garvey (Rastafari)
  - Engineer's Day (Colombia)
  - Flag Day (Bolivia)
  - Independence Day (Indonesia)
  - Independence Days (Gabon)
  - National Vanilla Custard Day (United States)
  - Prekmurje Union Day (Slovenia)
  - San Martin Day (Argentina)
- 18 August
  - Arbor Day (Pakistan)
  - Armed Forces Day (North Macedonia)
  - Birthday of Virginia Dare (Roanoke Island)
  - Constitution Day (Indonesia)
  - Long Tan Day (Australia)
  - National Science Day (Thailand)
- 19 August
  - Feast of the Transfiguration (Julian calendar), and its related observances:
    - Buhe (Ethiopian Orthodox Tewahedo Church)
    - Saviour's Transfiguration, popularly known as the "Apples Feast" (Russian Orthodox Church and Georgian Orthodox Church)
  - Afghan Independence Day (Afghanistan)
  - August Revolution Commemoration Day (Vietnam)
  - Birthday of Crown Princess Mette-Marit (Norway)
  - Manuel Luis Quezón Day (Quezon City and other places in The Philippines named after Manuel L. Quezon)
  - National Aviation Day (United States)
  - National Potato Day (United States)
  - World Humanitarian Day
- 20 August
  - Indian Akshay Urja Day (India)
  - Restoration of Independence Day (Estonia)
  - Revolution of the King and People (Morocco)
  - Saint Stephen's Day (Hungary)
  - World Mosquito Day
- 21 August
  - Ninoy Aquino Day (Philippines)
  - Youth Day/King Mohammed VI's Birthday (Morocco)
- 22 August
  - Feast of the Coronation of Mary
  - Flag Day (Russia)
  - Madras Day (Chennai and Tamil Nadu, India)
  - National Eat a Peach Day (United States)
  - National Pecan Torte Day (United States)
- 23 August
  - Battle of Kursk Day (Russia)
  - Day of the National Flag (Ukraine)
  - European Day of Remembrance for Victims of Stalinism and Nazism or Black Ribbon Day (European Union and other countries), and related observances:
    - Liberation from Fascist Occupation Day (Romania)
  - International Day for the Remembrance of the Slave Trade and its Abolition
  - Umhlanga Day (Eswatini)
- 24 August
  - Flag Day (Liberia)
  - Independence Day of Ukraine
  - International Strange Music Day
  - National Waffle Day (United States)
  - Nostalgia Night (Uruguay)
  - Willka Raymi (Cusco, Peru)
- 25 August
  - Day of Songun (North Korea)
  - Independence Day (Uruguay)
  - Liberation Day (France)
  - National Banana Split Day (United States)
  - National Whiskey Sour Day (United States)
  - Soldier's Day (Brazil)
- 26 August
  - Herero Day (Namibia)
  - Heroes' Day (Namibia)
  - Repentance Day (Papua New Guinea)
  - Women's Equality Day (United States)
- 27 August
  - Film and Movies Day (Russia)
  - Independence Day of the Republic of Moldova
  - Lyndon Baines Johnson Day (Texas, United States)
  - National Banana Lovers Day (United States)
  - National Pots De Creme Day (United States)
- 28 August
  - Assumption of Mary (Eastern Orthodox Church (Public holiday in North Macedonia, Serbia, and Georgia (country))
  - Crackers of the Keyboard Day
  - National Cherry Turnover Day (United States)
- 29 August
  - International Day against Nuclear Tests
  - Miners' Day (Ukraine)
  - More Herbs, Less Salt Day
  - National Lemon Juice Day (United States)
  - National Chop Suey Day (United States)
  - National Sports Day (India)
  - Slovak National Uprising Anniversary (Slovakia)
  - Telugu Language Day (India)
- 30 August
  - Constitution Day (Kazakhstan)
  - Constitution Day (Turks and Caicos Islands)
  - Independence Day (Tatarstan, Russia, unrecognized)
  - International Day of the Disappeared (International)
  - Popular Consultation Day (East Timor)
  - Saint Rose of Lima's Day (Peru)
  - Victory Day (Turkey)
- 31 August
  - Baloch-Pakhtun Unity Day (Balochs and Pashtuns, International observance)
  - Day of Solidarity and Freedom (Poland)
  - Independence Day (Federation of Malaya, Malaysia)
  - Independence Day (Kyrgyzstan)
  - Independence Day (Trinidad and Tobago)
  - National Trail Mix Day (United States)
  - North Borneo Self-government Day (Sabah, Borneo)
  - Romanian Language Day (Romania, Moldova, Ukraine)
