= Holidays with paid time off in the United States =

Public holidays in the United States
- Public • Paid • Federal • Observance • School • Hallmark
- Observed by: Federal government State governments Local governments Private and public sector employers
- Type: National

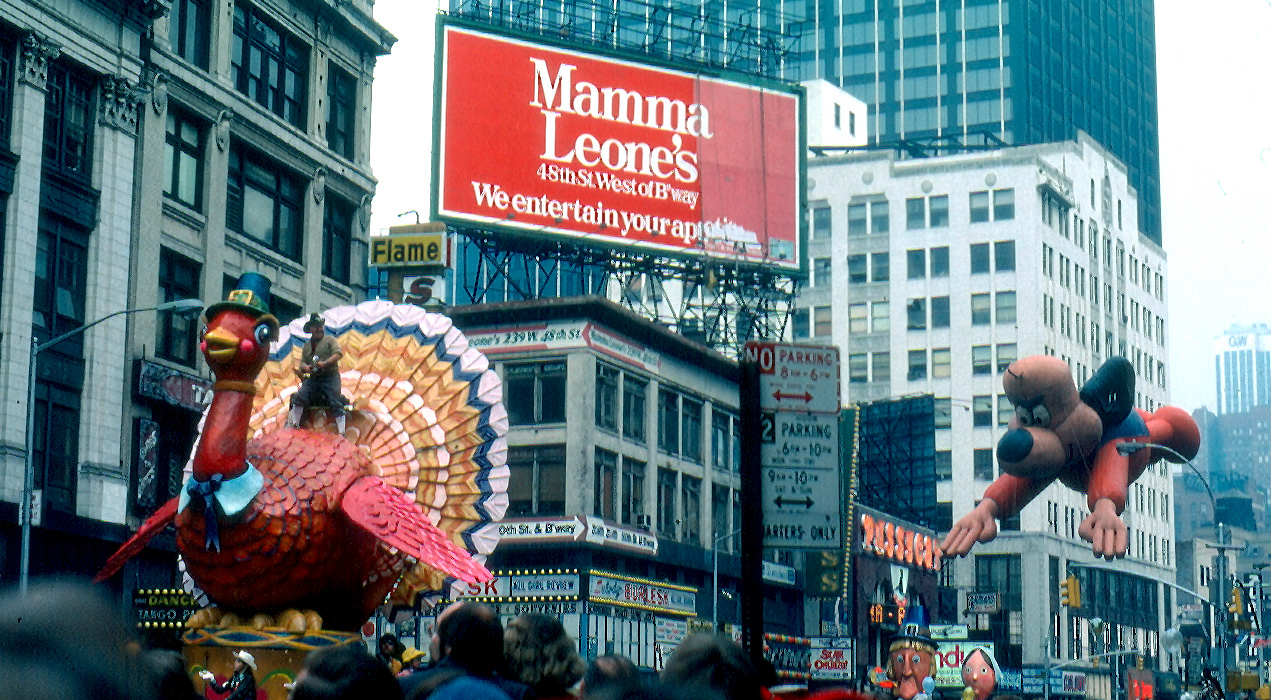
The 1979 Macy's Thanksgiving Day Parade

In the United States there are a number of observed holidays where employees receive paid time off. The labor force in the United States comprises about 62% (as of 2014) of the general population. In the United States, 97% of the private sector businesses determine what days this sector of the population gets paid time off, according to a study by the Society for Human Resource Management. The following holidays are observed by the majority of US businesses with paid time off: New Year's Day, New Year's Eve, Memorial Day, Independence Day, Labor Day, Thanksgiving, the day after known as Black Friday, Christmas Eve and Christmas. There are also numerous holidays on the state and local level that are observed to varying degrees.

== Holiday listing as paid time off ==
This list of holidays is based on the official list of federal holidays by year from the US Government. The holidays however are at the discretion of employers whose statistics are measured by the Bureau of Labor Statistics. Another list from the Society for Human Resource Management shows actual percentages of employers offering paid time off for each holiday. The term "major holiday" (bolded) coincides for those holidays that 90% or more of employers offered paid time off.

Date	*Official name	Percentage of Americans celebrating	**Percentage of businesses offering paid time off	Remarks
January 1 (fixed)	**New Year's Day**	72%	96%	Celebrates beginning of the Gregorian calendar year. Festivities include counting down to 12:00 midnight on the preceding night, New Year's Eve, often with fireworks display and party. The ball drop at Times Square in New York City has become a national New Year's festivity. Traditional end of Christmas and holiday season.
January 15–21 (3rd Monday)	Birthday of Martin Luther King Jr.	N/A	34–38%	Honors Martin Luther King Jr., civil rights leader, who was actually born on January 15, 1929; combined with other holidays in several states. Some cities and municipalities hold parades; and more recently, the 1994 King Holiday and Service Act, which was passed to encourage Americans to transform the King Holiday into a day of citizen action volunteer service, has gained in popularity (sometimes referred to as a National Day of Service).
January 20 or 21	Inauguration Day	N/A	0%	Celebrates the United States presidential inauguration, every 4 years. While this is a federal holiday, only federal employees in the Washington, DC area are entitled to a day off. Only Washington, DC observes this day besides the federal government.
February 15–21 (3rd Monday)	Washington's Birthday	52%	34–35%	Washington's Birthday was first declared a federal holiday by an 1879 act of Congress. The Uniform Holidays Act, 1968, shifted the date of the commemoration of Washington's Birthday from February 22 to the third Monday in February (between February 15 and 21, meaning the observed holiday never falls on Washington's actual birthday). Because of this, combined with the fact that President Lincoln's birthday falls on February 12, many people now refer to this holiday as "Presidents' Day" and consider it a day honoring all American presidents. However, neither the Uniform Holidays Act nor any subsequent law changed the name of the holiday from Washington's Birthday to Presidents' Day.
May 25–31 (last Monday)	**Memorial Day**	21%	95%	Honors the nation's war dead from the Civil War onwards; marks the unofficial beginning of the summer season (traditionally May 30, shifted by the Uniform Holidays Act 1968).
June 19 (fixed)	Juneteenth	0-12%	17-18%	Juneteenth commemorates June 19, 1865, when Union soldiers brought the news of freedom to enslaved Black people in Galveston, Texas — two months after the Confederacy had surrendered. That was also about 2 1/2 years after the Emancipation Proclamation freed slaves in the Southern states.
July 4 (fixed)	**Independence Day**	79%	97%	Celebrates the adoption of the Declaration of Independence from British rule, also called the Fourth of July or simply "The Fourth". Fireworks celebration are held in many cities throughout the country.
September 1–7 (1st Monday)	**Labor Day**	53%	95%	Celebrates the achievements of workers and the labor movement; marks the unofficial end of the summer season.
October 8–14 (2nd Monday)	Columbus Day	8%	13–16%	Honors Christopher Columbus, the first European to land in mainland Americas after Leif Erikson. In a growing number of locations this day is observed as Indigenous Peoples' Day, in honor of the Native Americans who lived in the Americas long before Columbus "discovered" the area.
November 11 (fixed)	Veterans Day	43%	16–21%	Honors all veterans of the United States armed forces. It is observed on November 11 to recall the end of World War I on that date in 1918 (major hostilities of World War I were formally ended at the 11th hour (GMT +1) of the 11th day of the 11th month of 1918 when the Armistice with Germany went into effect).
November 22–28 (4th Thursday)	**Thanksgiving Day**	87%	97%	Traditionally celebrates the giving of thanks for the autumn harvest. Traditionally includes the sharing of a turkey dinner.
December 25 (fixed)	**Christmas Day**	90–95%	94%	The most widely celebrated holiday of the Christian year, Christmas is observed as a commemoration of the birth of Jesus of Nazareth.

- List of Federal Holidays by Year from the U.S. Government (see Office of Personnel Management)
- Additional holidays referenced by the Society for Human Resource Management: Good Friday 26%, Easter Monday 6%, Yom Kippur 7%, Day before Thanksgiving 3–8%, Day after Thanksgiving 69–75%, Day before Christmas Eve 33%, Christmas Eve 78–79%, Day after Christmas 40–64%, Day before New Year's Eve 25–71% depending if it falls on a weekend, New Year's Eve 71%, Passover 3%, Hanukkah 1%, Ramadan 1%, Ash Wednesday 1%, Diwali 1%, Eid al-Adha 1%, Vietnamese New Year <1%, Chinese New Year <1%

== School holidays ==
An academic year typically spans from early fall to early summer, with two or three months of summer vacation marking the end of the year. K-12 public schools generally observe local, state, and federal holidays, plus additional days off around Thanksgiving, the period from before Christmas until after New Year's Day, a spring break (usually a week in April) and sometimes a winter break (a week in February or March). Two or three days per year are sometimes devoted to professional development for teachers and students have the day off.

Most colleges and universities divide the school year into two semesters. The fall semester often begins the day after Labor Day in early September and runs until mid-December. The spring semester typically starts in the middle or end of January and runs until May. Winter and summer classes might be offered in January and May–August. Major federal, state, and local holidays are often observed, including the day after and usually before Thanksgiving. Spring break is usually a week in March or early April, and in elementary and secondary school and college party culture traditionally involves a warm-weather trip.

Unscheduled weather-related cancellations and emergency cancellations can also affect school calendars.

When taking summer school or summer camp schedules into account, the Independence Day holiday on July 4 is usually a scheduled holiday observance for which the summer program closes.

== Government sector holidays: federal, state, and local government ==
The federal government sector labor force consisted of about 2,729,000 (as of 2014) of the total labor force of 150,539,900, which is about 2% of the total labor force or about 1% of the total population. In addition, state and local governments consist of another 19,134,000 bringing the total government sector employees to about 15% of the total labor force. This sector of the population is entitled to paid time off designated as federal holidays by Congress in Title V of the United States Code (5 U.S.C. § 6103). Both federal and state government employees generally observe the same federal holidays.

=== Federally regulated agencies: banks and financial institutions ===
US banks generally observe the federal holidays because of their reliance on the U.S. Federal Reserve for certain activities such as wire transfers and ACH transactions. For example, JP Morgan Chase observes all federal holidays except Columbus Day, while U.S. Bank observes all of them.

The New York Stock Exchange also closely follows the federal holidays except for Columbus Day and Veterans' Day. However, the agency also has extra holidays on the day before Independence Day and Good Friday.

=== Legal holidays by states and political divisions of the United States ===
In general, most state governments observe the same holidays that the federal government observes. However, while that is true for most states, every state includes and omits holidays to fit the culture relevant to its population. "All federal holidays" in state observations below excludes Inauguration Day, which is only observed by Washington, DC, and federal employees in that area.

Holiday	Number of states observed with government offices closed	Remarks
New Year's Day; Memorial Day; Juneteenth; Independence Day; Labor Day; Veterans Day; Thanksgiving Day; Christmas Day	50	These holidays are unanimously observed by the state governments of all 50 states.
Martin Luther King Jr. Day	45	Signed into law in 1983, but not observed by all states until 2000, with Utah officially observing as a paid state holiday. Five states observe this day using alternate name "Civil Rights Day" or holiday is combined to also honor Robert E. Lee.
Washington's Birthday (Presidents' Day)	38	Alternatively observed separately as George Washington's or Lincoln's Birthday.
Columbus Day	23	Fewer than half the states recognize Columbus Day.
Day after Thanksgiving	18	Observed by Delaware, Florida, Iowa, Kansas, Kentucky, Maryland, Michigan, Nebraska, New Hampshire, New Mexico, North Carolina, Pennsylvania, South Carolina, Texas, Vermont, Virginia, Washington, and West Virginia.
Good Friday	13	Observed by Connecticut, Delaware, Guam, Hawaii, Indiana, Kentucky, Louisiana, New Jersey, North Carolina, North Dakota, Puerto Rico, Tennessee and the US Virgin Islands.
Christmas Eve	12	Observed by Arkansas, Georgia, Indiana, Kentucky, Michigan, North Carolina, South Carolina, Tennessee, Texas, Virginia, West Virginia, Wisconsin
Election Day	10	Observed by Delaware, Hawaii, Illinois, Indiana, Michigan, Montana, New Jersey, New York, Pennsylvania, and Rhode Island
Confederate Memorial Day	7	Observed by Alabama, Florida, (Note: In Florida, Confederate Memorial Day is called "Confederate Heroes Day") Mississippi, North Carolina, South Carolina, Tennessee, (Note: In Tennessee, Confederate Memorial Day is called "Confederate Decoration Day") and Texas (Note: In Texas, Confederate Memorial Day is called "Confederate Heroes Day") (formerly observed by Arkansas, Georgia, Louisiana, and Virginia)
Day after Christmas	6	Observed by Kentucky, Michigan, North Carolina, South Carolina, Texas, and the US Virgin Islands.
Lincoln's Birthday	5	Observed by Connecticut, Illinois, Missouri, New Jersey, and New York
New Year's Eve	4	Observed by Kentucky, Michigan, West Virginia, and Wisconsin.

==== Alabama ====
- All federal holidays
- January 15–21 (3rd Monday) – this federal holiday is renamed "Robert E. Lee/Martin Luther King Birthday"
- February 15–21 (3rd Monday) – this federal holiday is renamed "George Washington/Thomas Jefferson Birthday"
- April 22–28 (4th Monday) – Confederate Memorial Day
- June 1–7 (1st Monday) – Birthday of Jefferson Davis
- October 8–14 (2nd Monday) – Renamed Columbus Day / Fraternal Day / American Indian Heritage Day

===== Baldwin County, Alabama =====
- All Alabama state holidays
- February 3 – March 9 (floating Tuesday using Computus) – Mardi Gras

===== Mobile County, Alabama =====
- All Alabama state holidays
- February 3 – March 9 (floating Tuesday using Computus) – Mardi Gras

===== Perry County, Alabama =====
- All Alabama state holidays
- November 8–14 (2nd Monday) – Barack Obama Day

==== Alaska ====
- All federal holidays except Columbus Day
- March 25–31 (last Monday) – Seward's Day
- October 18 – Alaska Day

==== American Samoa ====
- All federal holidays
- April 17 - American Samoa Flag Day
- May 13 - Swains Island Day
- July 16 - Manu'a Cession Day

==== Arizona ====
- All federal holidays
- January 15–21 (3rd Monday) – this federal holiday is renamed "Dr. Martin Luther King Jr./Civil Rights Day".
- February 15–21 (3rd Monday) – this federal holiday is renamed "Lincoln/Washington Presidents' Day".

==== Arkansas ====
- All federal holidays except Columbus Day
- February 15–21 (3rd Monday) – this federal holiday is renamed "George Washington's Birthday and Daisy Gatson Bates Day".
- December 24 – Christmas Eve

==== California ====
- All federal holidays except Columbus Day
- March 31 (fixed) – Farmworkers Day (Cesar Chavez Day until 2026)
- November 23–29 (floating Friday) – day after Thanksgiving

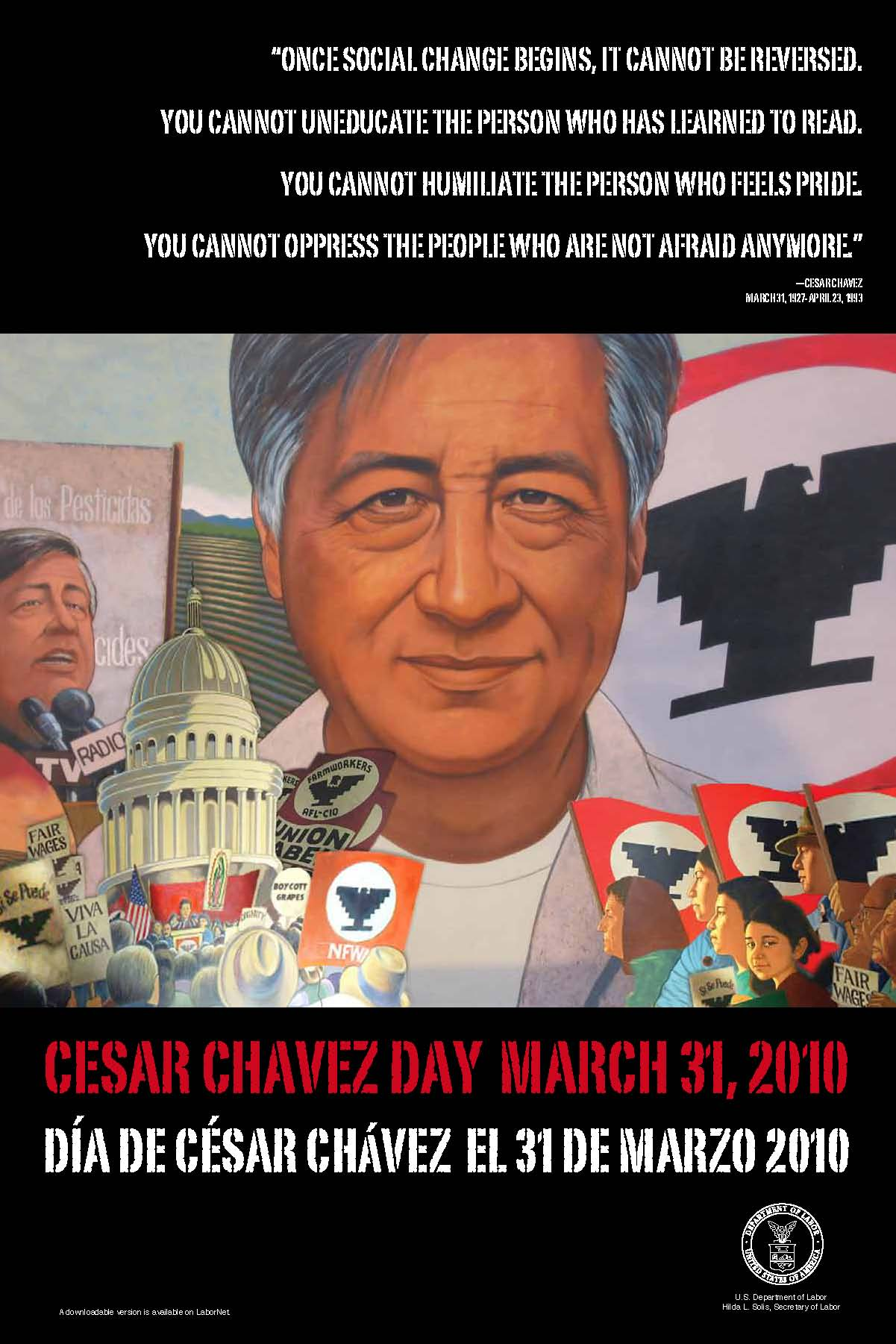
César Chávez Day poster

===== California education holidays =====
- All California state holidays (schools closed)
- January 23 – Ed Roberts Day (schools open, but with related instructions)
- January 30 – Fred Korematsu Day of Civil Liberties (schools open, but with related instructions)
- February 6 – Ronald Reagan Day (schools open, but with related instructions)
- February 12 – Lincoln's Birthday (schools closed) (some school districts observe the holiday on the second Monday in February)
- February 15 – Susan B. Anthony Day (schools open, but with related instructions)
- March 5 – death of Crispus Attucks (schools open, but with related instructions)
- March 7 – birthday of Luther Burbank / Arbor Day (schools open, but with related instructions)
- March 30 – Vietnamese Veterans Day (schools open, but with related instructions)
- April 6 – California Poppy Day (schools open, but with related instructions)
- April 21 – John Muir Day (schools open, but with related instructions)
- May 8–14 (2nd Wednesday) – Day of the Teacher (schools open, but with related instructions)
- May 22 – Harvey Milk Day (schools open, but with related instructions)
- September 22–28 (4th Monday) – Native American Day (schools closed)
- October 25 – Larry Itliong Day (schools open, but with related instructions)

Lincoln's Birthday (February 12) was removed from California's education holiday calendar in 2009.

===== Berkeley, California =====
- All California holidays except Cesar Chavez Day
- February 12 (fixed) – Lincoln's Birthday
- May 19 (fixed) – Malcolm X Day
- October 8–14 (2nd Monday) – Indigenous Peoples' Day

===== San Francisco, California =====
- All California holidays except Cesar Chavez Day
- October 8–14 (2nd Monday) – Columbus Day (added because the holiday was omitted by the California state government)

===== West Hollywood, California =====
- All California holidays except Cesar Chavez Day and the Day after Thanksgiving
- May 22 (fixed) – Harvey Milk Day

==== Colorado ====
- All federal holidays

==== Connecticut ====
- All federal holidays
- February 12 – Lincoln's Birthday
- March 20 – April 23 (floating Friday using Computus) – Good Friday
- October 17 – November 14 – Diwali

==== Delaware ====
- All federal holidays except Washington's Birthday and Columbus Day
- March 20 – April 23 (floating Friday using Computus) – Good Friday
- November 2–8 (floating Tuesday) – Election Day (in even-numbered years)
- November 23–29 (floating Friday) – day After Thanksgiving

==== District of Columbia ====
- All federal holidays
- January 20 – Inauguration Day (every 4 years)
- April 16 – Emancipation Day

==== Florida ====
Florida's laws separately defines "paid holidays" versus "legal holidays", which does not have any obligation to include as "paid holidays".

- All federal holidays except Washington's Birthday and Columbus Day
- November 23–29 (floating Friday) – day after Thanksgiving

===== Florida legal holidays =====
Florida's laws separate the definitions between paid versus legal holidays. The following list shows only the legal holidays that were not defined as "paid holidays":

- All Florida state holidays
- January 18 – Martin Luther King Jr.
- February 3 – March 9 (floating Tuesday using Computus) – Shrove Tuesday / Mardi Gras
- February 12 – Lincoln's Birthday
- February 15 – Susan B. Anthony Day
- February 15–21 (3rd Monday) – Washington's Birthday (reincluded because the holiday is not listed under the Florida government holidays)
- March 20 – April 23 (floating Friday using Computus) – Good Friday
- April 2 – Pascua Florida Day
- April 26 – Confederate Memorial Day
- June 3 – birthday of Jefferson Davis
- June 14 – Flag Day
- October 8–14 (2nd Monday) – renamed holiday as Columbus and Farmers' Day
- November 2–8 (floating Tuesday) – Election Day

===== Florida circuit courts =====
(Note: See also: Florida Circuit Court Holidays)

- All Florida state holidays
- February 15–21 (3rd Monday) – Presidents' Day (reincluded because the Florida state government omits this holiday)
- March 20 – April 23 (floating Friday using Computus) – Good Friday
- September 5 – October 5 (floating date) – Rosh Hashannah
- September 14 – October 14 (floating date) – Yom Kippur

===== Miami-Dade, Florida =====
- All Florida state holidays
- February 15–21 (3rd Monday) – Presidents' Day (reincluded because the Florida state government excludes this date)
- October 8–14 (2nd Monday) – Columbus Day (reincluded because the Florida state government excludes this date)

==== Georgia ====
- All federal holidays except President's Day
- March 20 – April 23 (floating Friday using Computus) – State Holiday, Observed on Good Friday
- November 23–29 (Friday after Thanksgiving) – State Holiday, formerly Robert E. Lee Day (observed in other states around January 19)
- December 24 – Washington's Birthday observed. If December 24 is a Wednesday, then this holiday is observed on Friday December 26.

==== Guam ====
- All federal holidays
- March 7 – Guam History and Chamorro Heritage Day
- July 21 – Liberation Day
- November 2 – All Souls' Day
- December 8 – Lady of Camarin Day

==== Hawaii ====
- All federal holidays except Columbus Day and Juneteenth
- March 20 – April 23 (floating Friday using Computus) – Good Friday
- March 26 – Prince Jonah Kūhiō Kalanianaʻole Day
- June 11 – Kamehameha Day
- August 15–21 (3rd Friday) – Statehood Day
- November 2–8 (floating Tuesday) – Election Day (in even-numbered years)

==== Idaho ====
- All federal holidays
- January 15–21 (3rd Monday) – this federal holiday is renamed "Martin Luther King Jr.–Idaho Human Rights Day"

==== Illinois ====
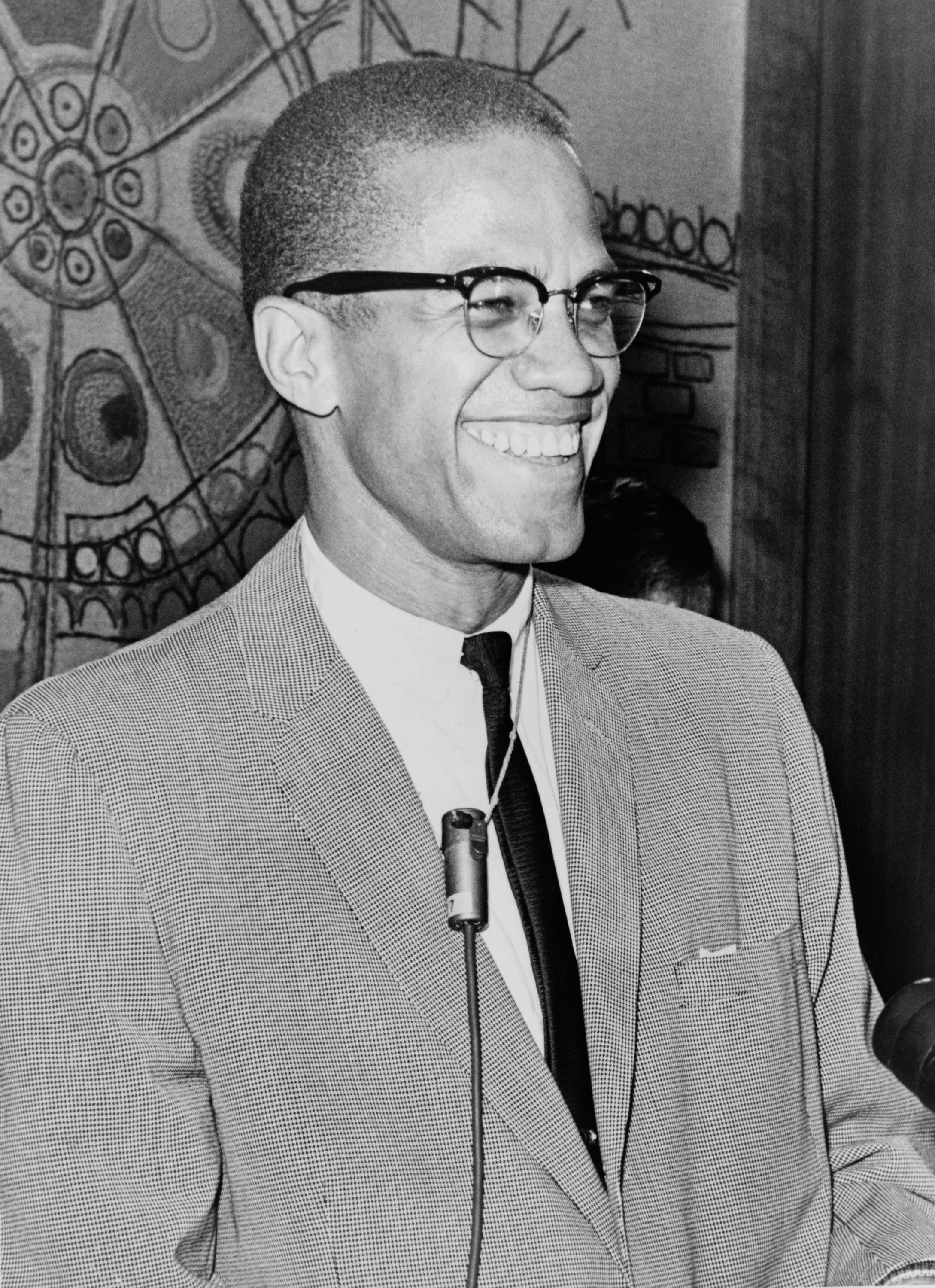
Illinois is the first state to declare Malcolm X Day a holiday only in 2015. Today, the holiday is only official in Berkeley, California since 1979 with city offices closed.

- All federal holidays
- February 12 – Lincoln's Birthday
- November 2–8 (floating Tuesday) – Election Day (in even-numbered years)
- November 23–29 (floating Friday) – day after Thanksgiving

===== Chicago, Illinois =====
- All Illinois state holidays except the Day after Thanksgiving
- March 1–7 (1st Monday) – Pulaski Day

==== Indiana ====
- All federal holidays except Washington's Birthday
- March 20 – April 23 (floating Friday using Computus) – Good Friday
- May 1–7 (1st Monday) – Primary Election Day
- November 2–8 (floating Monday) – General Election Day
- November 23–29 (floating Friday) – Lincoln's Birthday to occur on day after Thanksgiving
- December 24 – Washington's Birthday to occur on Christmas Eve

==== Iowa ====
- All federal holidays except Washington's Birthday and Columbus Day
- November 23–29 (floating Friday) – Day after Thanksgiving

==== Kansas ====
- All federal holidays except Washington's Birthday and Columbus Day

==== Kentucky ====
- All federal holidays except Washington's Birthday and Columbus Day
- March 20 – April 23 (floating Friday using Computus) – Good Friday(half holiday)
- November 23–29 (floating Friday) – Day after Thanksgiving
- December 24 – Christmas Eve
- December 31 – New Year's Eve

==== Louisiana ====
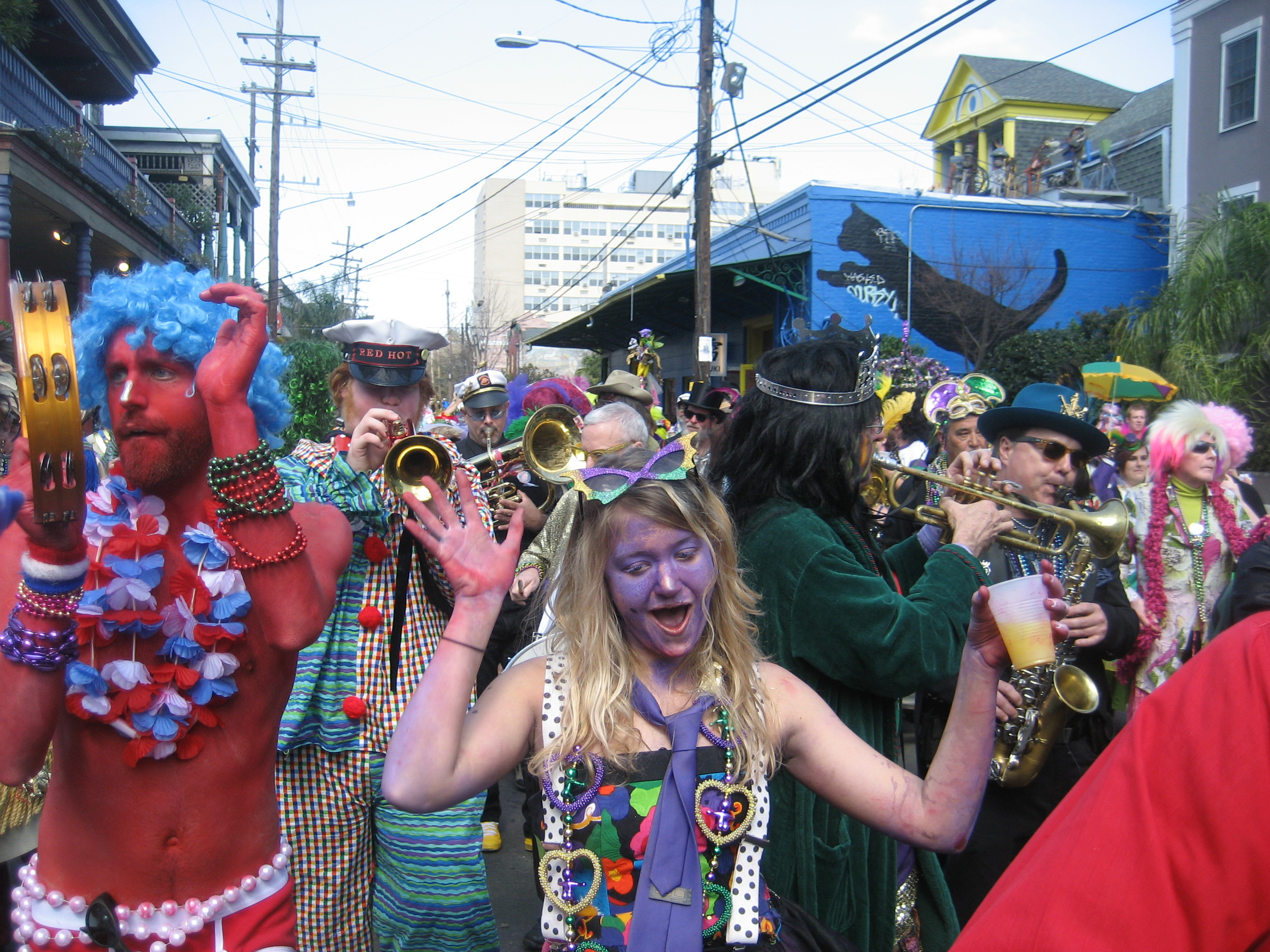
Mardi Gras is celebrated in New Orleans.

- All federal holidays except Columbus Day
- February 3 – March 9 (floating Tuesday using Computus) – Mardi Gras
- March 20 – April 23 (floating Friday using Computus) – Good Friday
- November 2–8 (floating Tuesday) – Election Day (in even-numbered years)

===== Louisiana courts =====
- All Louisiana state holidays
- November 1 – All Saints' Day
- November 23–29 (floating Friday) – Day after Thanksgiving
- December 24 – Christmas Eve
- December 31 – New Year's Eve

===== Baton Rouge, Louisiana =====
- All Louisiana state holidays
- January 20 – Inauguration Day (every four years)

==== Maine ====
- All federal holidays
- April 15–21 (3rd Monday) – Patriots' Day
- November 23–29 (floating Friday) – Day after Thanksgiving

==== Maryland ====
- All federal holidays
- November 2–8 (floating Tuesday) – Election Day (every two years)
- November 23–29 (floating Friday) – Native American Heritage Day

==== Massachusetts ====
- All federal holidays
- April 15–21 (3rd Monday) – Patriots' Day

===== Suffolk County, Massachusetts =====
- All Massachusetts state holidays
- March 17 – Evacuation Day
- June 17 – Bunker Hill Day

==== Michigan ====
- All federal holidays except Columbus Day
- November 2–8 (floating Tuesday) – General Election Day (even numbered years only)
- November 23–29 (floating Friday) – Day after Thanksgiving
- December 24 – Christmas Eve (if Christmas Eve falls on Sunday as it does in 2023, December 22 is the observed holiday)
- December 31 – New Year's Eve (if New Year's Eve falls on Sunday as it does in 2023, December 29 is the observed holiday)

==== Minnesota ====
- All federal holidays except Columbus Day
- November 23–29 (floating Friday) – Day after Thanksgiving

==== Mississippi ====
- All federal holidays except Columbus Day
- January 15–21 (3rd Monday) – this federal holiday is renamed "Martin Luther King's and Robert E. Lee's Birthdays"
- April 24–30 (last Monday) – Confederate Memorial Day
- May 25–31 (last Monday) – renamed National Memorial Day / Jefferson Davis Birthday
- November 11 – renamed Armistice Day (Veterans Day)

==== Missouri ====
- All federal holidays
- February 12 – Lincoln's Birthday
- May 8 – Truman Day

==== Montana ====
- All federal holidays
- November 2–8 (floating Tuesday) – General Election Day

==== Nebraska ====
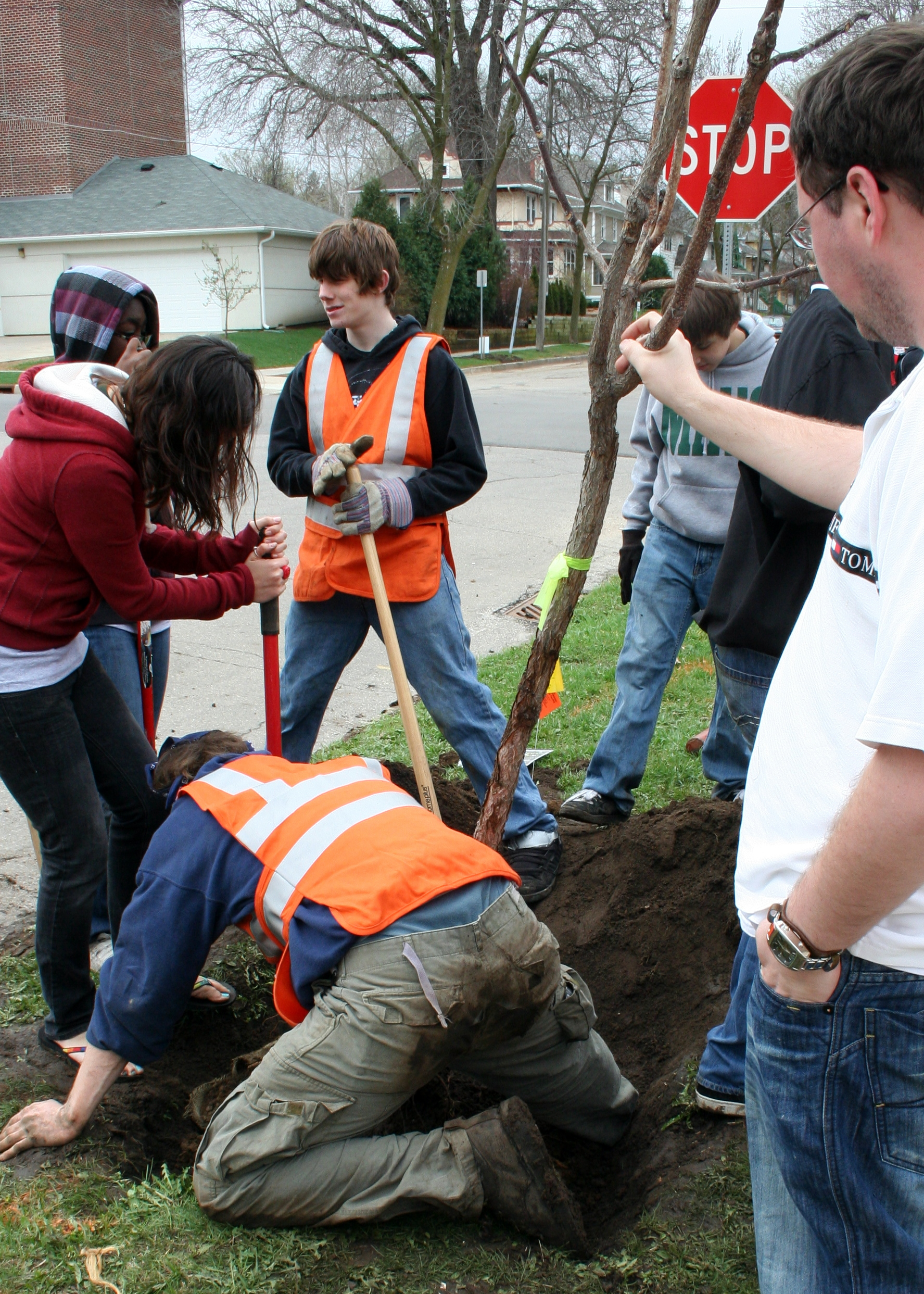
Arbor Day tree planting

- All federal holidays
- April 24–30 (last Friday) – Arbor Day
- November 23–29 (floating Friday) – Day after Thanksgiving

==== Nevada ====
- All federal holidays except Columbus Day.
- October 25–31 (last Friday) – Nevada Day
- November 23–29 (floating Friday) – Family Day

==== New Hampshire ====
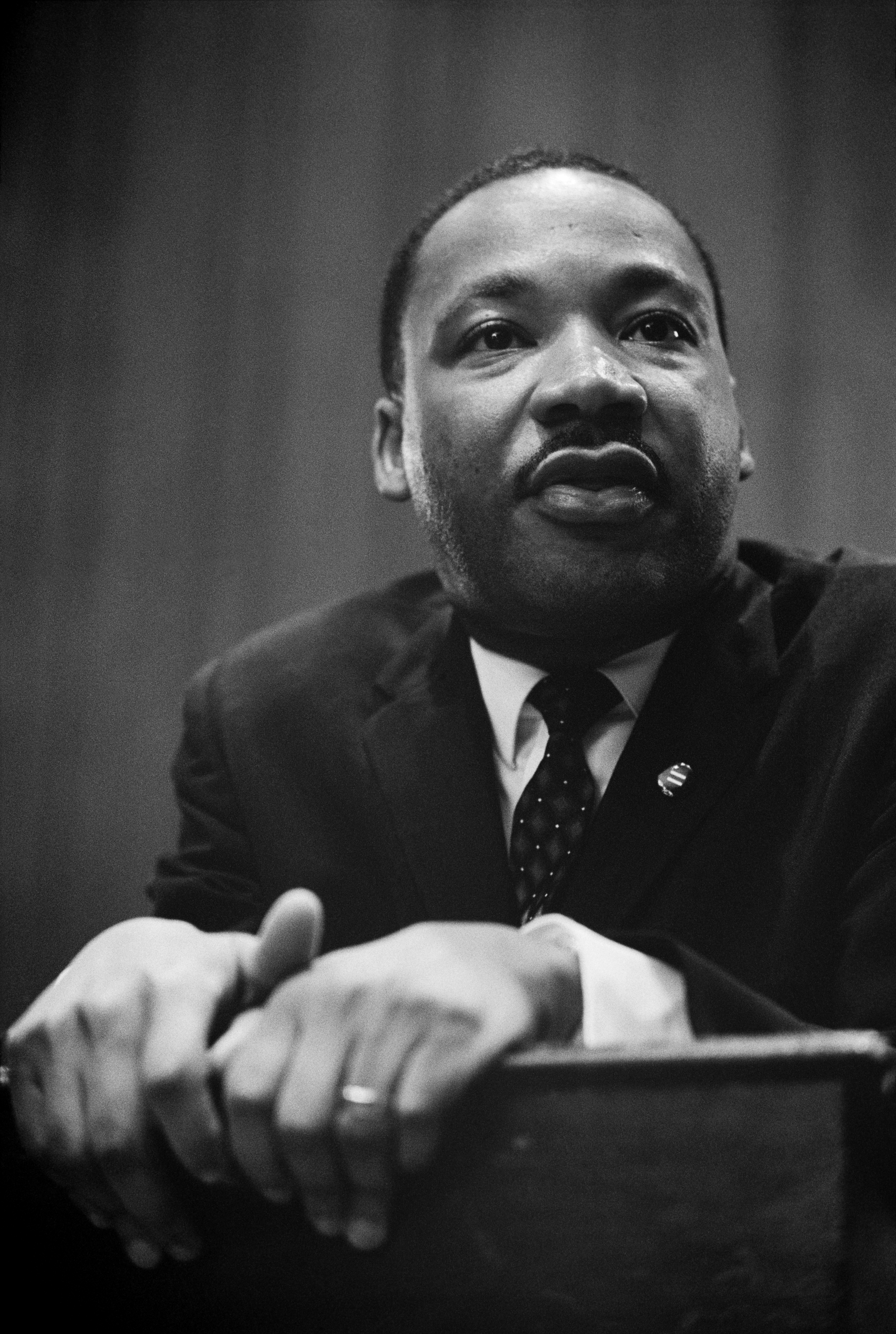
New Hampshire is one of a few states that does not honor Martin Luther King Jr. Day with its official national federal name.

- All federal holidays (offices remain open on Columbus Day)
- January 15–21 (3rd Monday) – this federal holiday is renamed Martin Luther King Jr. Civil Rights Day
- November 23–29 (floating Friday) – the day after Thanksgiving

==== New Jersey ====
- All federal holidays
- March 20 – April 23 (floating Friday using Computus) – Good Friday
- November 2–8 (floating Tuesday) – Election Day
  - Friday following 4th Thursday in November - Day After Thanksgiving (this used to be a state holiday for all branches of government; it is sometimes still proclaimed as a holiday for the Judicial branch of government, usually not until November.)

==== New Mexico ====
- All federal holidays except Washington's Birthday
- November 23–29 (floating Friday) – holiday in lieu of Presidents' Day

==== New York ====
- All federal holidays
- February 12 – Lincoln's Birthday
- November 2–8 (floating Tuesday) – Election Day (November 4, 2025; November 3, 2026; November 2, 2027; November 7, 2028)

===== New York City Public Schools =====
- All New York State holidays and most national school holidays
- January 21 – February 20 (floating on new moon date) – Lunar New Year (January 29, 2025; February 17, 2026; February 6, 2027; January 26, 2028)
- February – Mid-Winter Recess (includes Lincoln's Birthday and Washington's Birthday)
- March 20 – April 23 (floating Friday using Computus) – Good Friday
- April – Spring Recess
- July–August – Summer vacation (includes Independence Day)
- September 5 – October 5 (floating date) – Rosh Hashannah
- September 14 – October 14 (floating date) – Yom Kippur
- December – Winter Recess (includes Christmas and New Year's Day)
- Eid al-Fitr (date can vary year-round) – Schools are closed if the holiday falls within the academic year
- Eid al-Adha (date can vary year-round) – Schools are closed if the holiday falls within the academic year
- Diwali

==== North Carolina ====
- All federal holidays except Washington's Birthday and Columbus Day, plus the following four state holidays:
- March 20 – April 23 (floating Friday using Computus) – Good Friday
- November 23–29 (floating Friday) – Day After Thanksgiving
- December 22–28 (floating days) – Christmas Eve and Day after Christmas (three days sequentially; adjusted if any falls on a weekend)

==== North Dakota ====
- All federal holidays except Columbus Day
- March 20 – April 23 (floating Friday using Computus) - Good Friday

==== Northern Mariana Islands ====
- All federal holidays
- March 24 – Commonwealth Covenant Day
- March 20 – April 23 (floating Friday using Computus) – Good Friday
- November 4 – Citizenship Day
- December 8 – Constitution Day

==== Ohio ====
- All federal holidays

===== Sandusky, Ohio =====
- All Ohio holidays except Columbus Day
- November 2–8 (floating Tuesday) – Election Day

==== Oklahoma ====
- All federal holidays except Columbus Day
- November 23–29 (floating Friday) – Day after Thanksgiving
- December 26 – Day after Christmas

==== Oregon ====
- All federal holidays except Columbus Day

==== Pennsylvania ====
- All federal holidays
- March 20 – April 23 (floating Friday using Computus) – Good Friday
- November 2–8 (floating Tuesday) – Election Day
- November 23–29 (floating Friday) – Day after Thanksgiving

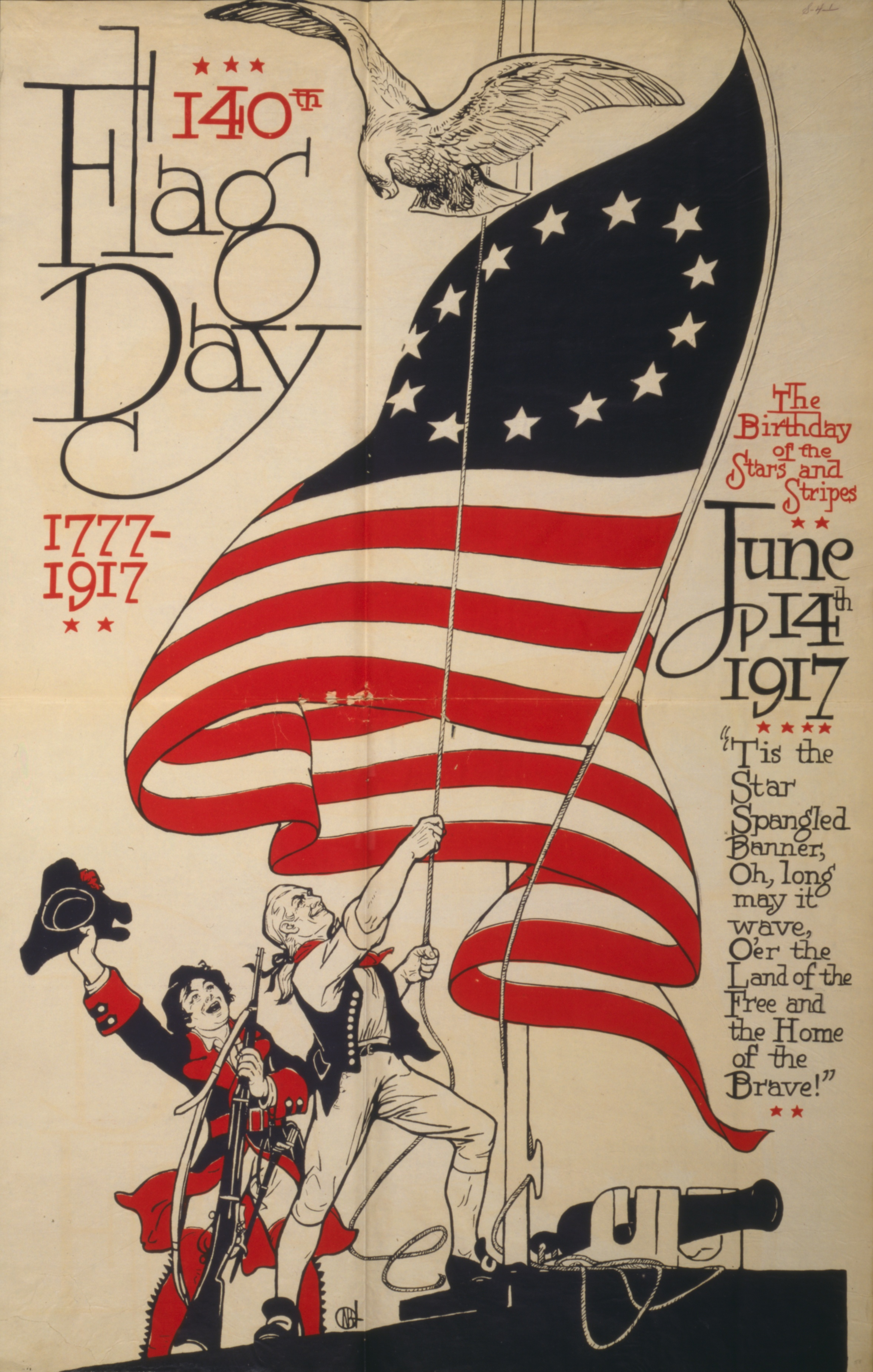
Flag Day is observed in Pennsylvania.

==== Puerto Rico ====
- All federal holidays
- January 6 – Three Kings Day/Epiphany
- January 8–14 (2nd Monday) – Eugenio María de Hostos Birthday
- March 2 - American Citizenship Day
- March 22 – Emancipation Day
- March 20 – April 23 (floating Friday using Computus) – Good Friday
- March 22 – April 25 (floating Sunday using Computus) – Easter
- April 15–21 (3rd Monday) – José de Diego Birthday
- May 8–14 (2nd Sunday) – Mother's Day
- June 15–21 (3rd Sunday) – Father's Day
- July 15–21 (3rd Monday) – Luis Muñoz Rivera Birthday
- July 25 – Constitution of Puerto Rico Day
- July 27 – José Celso Barbosa Birthday
- November 19 – Discovery of Puerto Rico Day

==== Rhode Island ====
- All federal holidays except Washington's Birthday
- August 8–14 (2nd Monday) – Victory Day
- November 2–8 (floating Tuesday) – Election Day

==== South Carolina ====
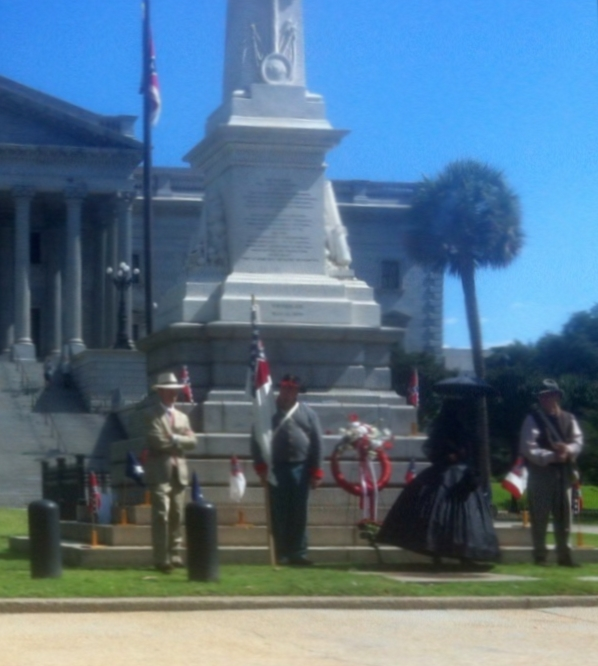
Confederate Memorial Day observance in Columbia, SC

- All federal holidays except Columbus Day
- May 10 – Confederate Memorial Day
- November 23–29 (floating Friday) – Day after Thanksgiving
- December 24 – Christmas Eve
- December 26 – Day after Christmas

==== South Dakota ====
- All federal holidays except Columbus Day
- October 8–14 (2nd Monday) – Native Americans Day

==== Tennessee ====
- All federal holidays except Columbus Day
- March 20 – April 23 (floating Friday using Computus) – Good Friday
- December 24 – Christmas Eve

==== Texas ====
Texas has three types of state holidays: those on which all state offices are closed, and "partial staffing" and "optional" holidays on which offices are open but with reduced staffing.

The following days are full holidays where all state offices are closed:

- All federal holidays except Columbus Day.
- November 23–29 (floating Friday) – Friday after Thanksgiving
- December 24 – Christmas Eve
- December 26 – Day after Christmas

===== Texas partial staffing holidays =====
Texas law designates that the state businesses be "partially staffed" on the following holidays. These holidays can be replaced with an optional holiday per the state employee's choice, but will give up one of these in lieu of the optional holiday.

- January 19 – Confederate Heroes Day
- March 2 – Texas Independence Day
- April 21 – San Jacinto Day
- June 19 – Emancipation Day in Texas
- August 27 – Lyndon Baines Johnson Day

===== Texas optional holidays =====
Texas law allows a state employee to replace a partial staffing holiday with one of the following holidays. On these holidays, the state agency is generally required to stay open with minimum staff.

- March 20 – April 23 (floating Friday using Computus) – Good Friday
- March 31 – Cesar Chavez Day (added in section 662.013, was not one of the original "optional holidays" declared in 1999)
- September 5 – October 5 (floating date) – Rosh Hashanah
- September 14 – October 14 (floating date) – Yom Kippur

==== U.S. Virgin Islands ====
- All federal holidays
- January 6 – Three Kings Day
- March 31 – Transfer Day
- March 19 – April 22 (floating Thursday using Computus) – Holy Thursday
- March 20 – April 23 (floating Friday using Computus) – Good Friday
- March 23 – April 26 (floating Monday using Computus) – Easter Monday
- July 3 – Emancipation Day
- October 8–14 (2nd Monday) – Renamed to Columbus Day – Virgin Islands–Puerto Rico Friendship Day
- November 1 – D. Hamilton Jackson Day
- December 26 – Christmas Second Day

==== Utah ====
- All federal holidays
- July 24 – Pioneer Day

==== Vermont ====
- All federal holidays except Columbus Day
- March 1–7 (1st Tuesday) – Town Meeting Day
- August 16 – Bennington Battle Day

==== Virginia ====
- All federal holidays
- February 15–21 (3rd Monday) – The federal holiday Washington's Birthday is recognized as "George Washington Day".
- October 8–14 (2nd Monday) – The federal holiday Columbus Day is recognized as "Columbus Day and Yorktown Victory Day", which honors the final victory at the Siege of Yorktown in the Revolutionary War.
- November 2–8 (floating Tuesday) – Election Day
- November 23–29 (floating Friday) – Day after Thanksgiving

==== Wake Island ====
- All federal holidays except Martin Luther King Jr. Day
- All Friday holidays are celebrated on Saturday and all Monday holidays are celebrated on Tuesday to account for the time zone difference with the states. Weekday holidays such as Thanksgiving are celebrated as they fall.
- March 20 – April 23 (floating Friday using Computus) – Good Friday
- March 22 – April 25 (floating Sunday using Computus) – Easter (listed to account for park closing, which normally opens Sundays)
- April 13–15 – Songkran Festival
- December 31 – New Year's Eve

==== Washington ====
- All federal holidays except Columbus Day

==== West Virginia ====
- All federal holidays
- June 20 – West Virginia Day
- November 2–8 (floating Tuesday) – Election Day / Susan B. Anthony Day (even numbered years only),
- November 23–29 (floating Friday) – Day after Thanksgiving
- December 24 – Christmas Eve (See note below)
- December 31 – New Year's Eve (See note below)
- Note: Christmas Eve and New Year's Eve are half day holidays and are not shifted if they fall on Saturday or Sunday.

==== Wisconsin ====
- All federal holidays except Washington's Birthday and Columbus Day
- December 24 – Christmas Eve
- December 31 – New Year's Eve
- January 1 – New Year's Day

===== Wisconsin Public School Observance Days =====
Wisconsin's public schools are obligated to observe the 21 days designated by Wisconsin Statute section 118.02 on the designated day unless the day falls on Saturday or Sunday, in which case would move the observance to either the preceding Friday or following Monday. The statutes require the public schools to include instruction relating to the holidays. In this list of holidays, all schools remain open.

- January 15 – Martin Luther King Jr. Day
- February 12 – Lincoln's Birthday
- February 15 – Susan B. Anthony Day
- February 22 – Washington's Birthday
- March 4 – Casimir Pulaski Day
- March 17 – "The Great Hunger" in Ireland
- April 9 – Prisoners of War Remembrance Day
- April 13 – American's Creed Day
- April 19 – Patriots' Day
- April 22 – Environmental Awareness Day
- April 29 – Arbor Day
- June 14 – Robert La Follette Sr. Day
- September 16 – Mildred Fish Harnack Day
- September 16 – Wisconsin Day
- September 17 – Constitution Day
- September 18 – POW-MIA Recognition Day
- September 23 – Bullying Awareness Day
- September 28 – Francis Willard Day
- October 9 – Leif Erikson Day
- October 12 – Columbus Day
- November 11 – Veterans Day

==== Wyoming ====
- All federal holidays except Columbus Day and Juneteenth
- January 15–21 (3rd Monday) – renamed Martin Luther King Jr. / Wyoming Equality Day

==== Federal holidays at the state level ====
While most federal holidays are observed at the state level, some of these holidays are observed with different names, are observed on different days, or completely not observed in some states of the United States. a. For example, Martin Luther King Jr. Day is known officially as Martin Luther King, Jr./Civil Rights Day in Arizona, and New Hampshire, Birthday of Dr. Martin Luther King, Jr. in Florida, and Maryland, Martin Luther King Jr. / Idaho Human Rights Day in Idaho, Robert E. Lee/Martin Luther King Birthday in Alabama, and Martin Luther King's and Robert E. Lee's Birthdays in Mississippi. b. Washington's Birthday is known officially as President's Day in Alaska, California, Hawaii, Idaho, Maryland, Nebraska, New Hampshire, Tennessee, Washington, West Virginia, and Wyoming, Washington-Lincoln Day in Colorado (CRS 24-11-101), Ohio, Lincoln/Washington/Presidents' Day in Arizona, George Washington's Birthday and Daisy Gatson Bates Day in Arkansas, Presidents' Day in Hawaii, Massachusetts, New Mexico, North Dakota, Oklahoma, South Dakota, Texas, and Vermont, Washington's Birthday/President's Day in Maine, Presidents Day in Michigan, Minnesota, Nevada, New Jersey, and Oregon, Lincoln's and Washington's Birthday in Montana, Washington and Lincoln Day in Utah, and George Washington Day in Virginia. The day after Thanksgiving is observed in lieu of Columbus Day in Minnesota. Columbus Day is listed as a state holiday in New Hampshire although state offices remain open. President's Day, Good Friday (11am–3pm), Juneteenth Day (June 19), Columbus Day, Veteran's Day, Partisan Primary Election Day, and General Election Day are listed as a state holiday in Wisconsin although state offices remain open.

==== Legal holidays observed nationwide ====
- January 1 – New Year's Day
- May 25–31 (last Monday) – Memorial Day
  - Known officially as National Memorial Day in Alabama,
  - and Memorial Day / Decoration Day in Idaho.
  - Observed with Jefferson Davis' Birthday, and known officially as National Memorial Day / Jefferson Davis' Birthday, in Mississippi.
- June 19 - Juneteenth
- July 4 – Independence Day
- September 1–7 (1st Monday) – Labor Day
- November 11 – Veterans Day
  - Known officially as Armistice Day in Mississippi.
- November 22–28 (4th Thursday) – Thanksgiving
- December 25 – Christmas

== See also ==
- Public holidays in the United States
