= Public holidays in Washington =

Public holidays in Washington may refer to:

- Public holidays in Washington (state)
- Public holidays in Washington, D.C.
