= Truman Day =

State holiday in Missouri

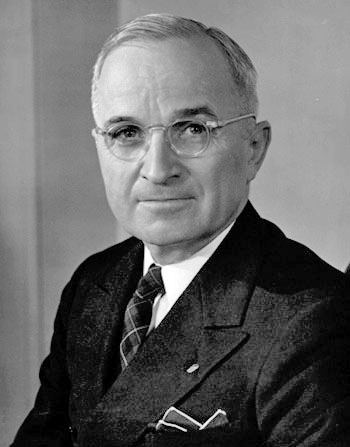
- Harry S. Truman
- Observed by: United States, Missouri
- Type: Secular
- Significance: Birthday of the only U.S. president to come from Missouri
- Date: May 8
- Next time: May 8, 2026
- Frequency: annual

Truman Day is a commemorative holiday to celebrate the birth of Harry S. Truman, the 33rd President of the United States. It is celebrated on May 8 in Missouri as a state holiday and nationally by the United States Democratic Party. Truman is the only U.S. President to come from Missouri, hence the significance to the state. For Missouri state employees, this is a paid holiday.

== Origins ==
Harry S. Truman (May 8, 1884 – December 26, 1972) was the 33rd President of the United States (1945–1953), an American politician of the Democratic Party. He served as a United States senator from Missouri (1935–1945) and briefly as Vice President (1945) before he succeeded to the presidency on April 12, 1945, upon the death of Franklin D. Roosevelt. He was president during the final months of World War II, making the decision to drop the atomic bomb on Hiroshima and Nagasaki. Truman was unexpectedly elected in his own right in 1948. He presided over an uncertain domestic scene as America sought its path after the war, and tensions with the Soviet Union increased, marking the start of the Cold War.

Post-presidency, Truman was a popular figure in Missouri, with Truman Day rallies having been held in Poplar Bluff, Missouri since at least 1966. However, May 8 was not officially designated a state holiday until June 1967 with the passage of House Bill 154. Governor Warren E. Hearnes celebrated the first Truman Day by unveiling a statue of Truman at Culver-Stockton College in Canton, Missouri in 1968.

In 2010, Missouri Governor Jay Nixon proposed abolishing the holiday in an effort to reduce the state's budget; however, the effort was unsuccessful.

== See also ==
- Public holidays in Missouri
