= American Family Day =

State recognized holiday

- Observed by: Arizona, United States
- Date: First Sunday in August
- 2024 date: August 4
- 2025 date: August 3
- 2026 date: August 2
- 2027 date: August 1
- Frequency: annual

American Family Day is the 14th state-recognized holiday in Arizona, Title 1-301. American Family Day, much like Mother's Day or Father's Day is a non-paid holiday established as a separate day to appreciate family members by spending time with them. Families are discouraged from buying gifts or other material items.

Arizona resident, John Makkai, is credited with pushing the holiday through the Arizona legislature. American Family Day began as a 1-year proclamation, signed by then Governor Raúl Héctor Castro, declaring August 7, 1977 American Family Day. The following year, American Family Day was signed into law as an official Arizona holiday by Governor Bruce Babbitt. The holiday also caught on in several other states, including North Carolina and Georgia.

From the Georgia Department of Education Parent Engagement Program, "American Family Day – this day brings families together to share their love and appreciation of one another."

== See also ==
- Family Day
- Father's Day
- Mother's Day
- Hallmark holiday
- International Mother's Day Shrine
- International Women's Day
- May crowning
- Mothering Sunday
- National Grandparents Day
