= Construction Holiday =

Canadian public holiday

The Construction Holiday (French: Vacances de la construction) is the most popular time for summer vacations in Quebec, Canada.

In 1970, The Province of Quebec legislated an annual holiday for the construction industry that begins on the second-last Sunday of July and lasts for two weeks. The holiday officially came into effect in the summer of 1971.

Many people living in Quebec outside the construction industry also take their holidays during that time. It is thus the busiest time of year for the tourism industry, with an increase of up to 40% of visitors at some sites.
