= International Clown Week =

Annual celebration

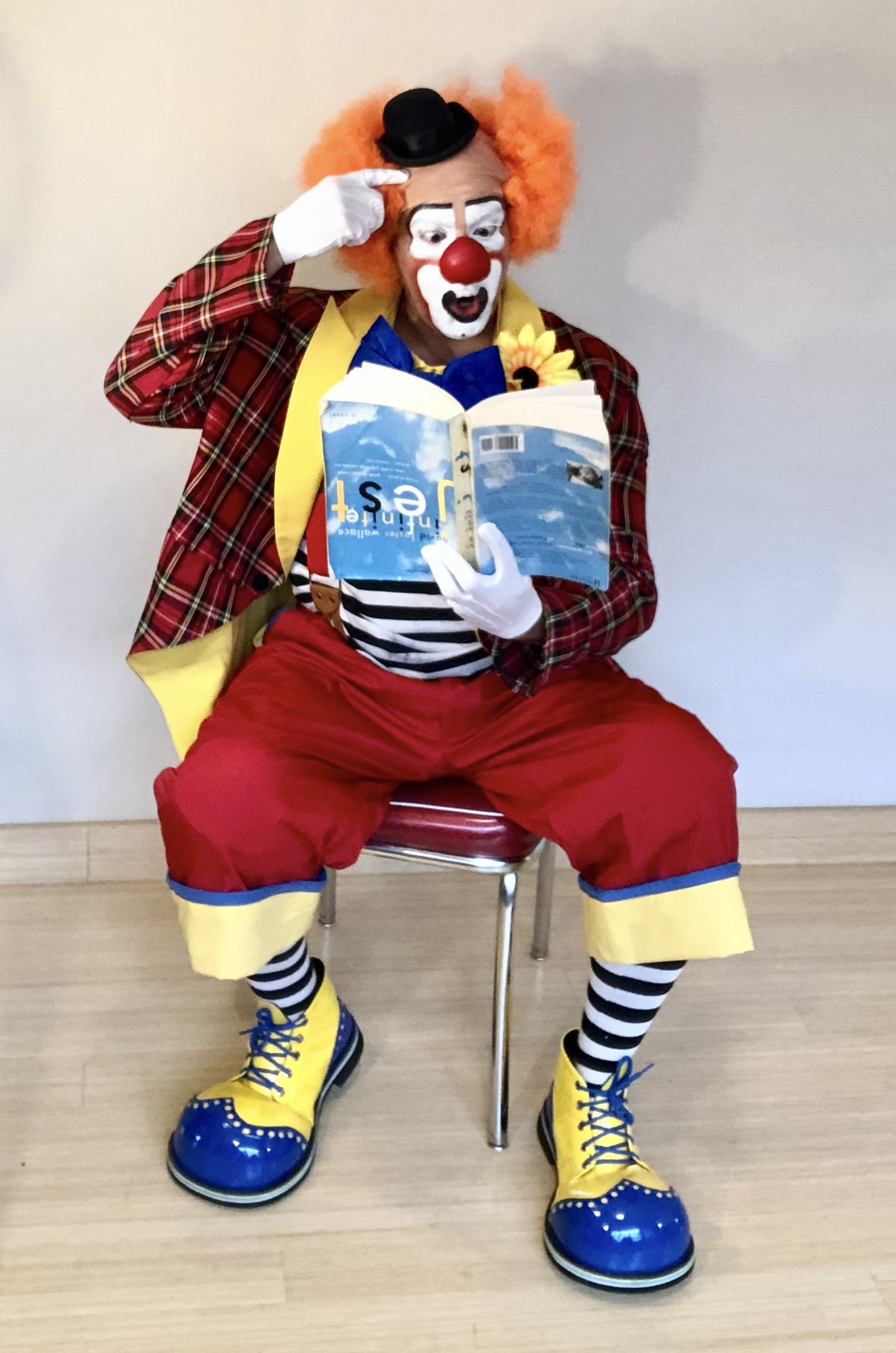
Typical clown.

International Clown Week is celebrated each year on the first week of August as a tribute to the first recognised group of organised clowns. Clown groups often celebrate the week with special activities such as performing volunteer shows or having their local mayor declare the week as a city celebration to coincide with the national and international clown week.

== History ==
Clown Week was celebrated on a limited scale in the 1950s. In 1966 the first International Clown Week chairman was appointed by Ray Bickford, president of Clown Club of America. In 1967 Clown Club of America members were urged to write to their congressmen and senators requesting a presidential proclamation naming July 21–27 as National Clown Week. In 1969 a resolution was introduced. After clowns met with Senator John McClellan of Arkansas, who was chairman of the United States Senate subcommittee on Observances and Holidays, success was finally achieved.

Concurrently, Bill "Boom-Boom" Baily was an original member of Clowns of America when it was founded in 1967. Baily was named the U.S. Chairman of National Clown Week for that organization.

Because each year a chairman had to be chosen in each state to ask their governor to issue a proclamation honoring National Clown Week, Baily pushed for National Clown Week publicity. He convinced Congressman Garmatz of Maryland and Congressman Myers of Indiana to introduce a joint resolution in Congress establishing National Clown Week as an annual event. He lobbied the United States Congress and organized a visit by clowns to the senate building in Washington, D.C.

On October 8, 1970, Public Law 91-443 under the 91st Congress, JJR 26 was passed by both the House and Senate and was sent to President Richard Nixon for his signature.

The joint resolution was signed into law by President Nixon on August 2, 1971.
