= Lyndon Baines Johnson Day =

Official holiday in Texas

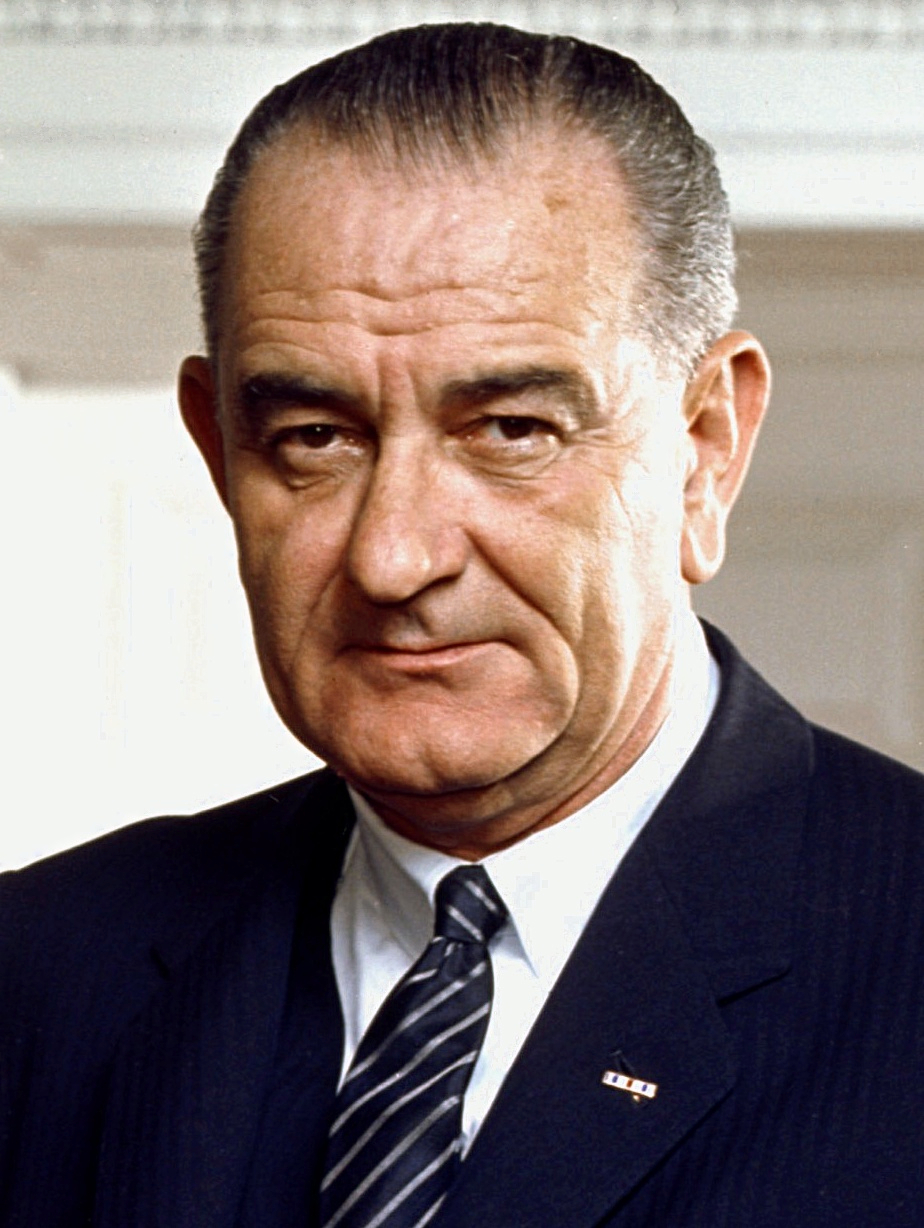
- Lyndon Baines Johnson
- Observed by: Texas, United States
- Type: Local
- Date: August 27
- Next time: August 27, 2026
- Frequency: annual

Lyndon Baines Johnson Day is a legal state holiday in Texas. It falls every year on August 27, to mark the birthday of U.S. President Lyndon Baines Johnson.

After Johnson died in 1973, the Texas State Legislature created a legal state holiday to be observed every year on August 27 to honor the 36th president of the United States, one of their state's native sons.

The holiday is optional for state employees and state offices do not close.

== Origins ==
Lyndon Baines Johnson (August 27, 1908 – January 22, 1973), often referred to as LBJ, was an American educator and politician who served as the 36th president of the United States from 1963 to 1969, assuming the office after serving as the 37th vice president from 1961 to 1963. Johnson was a Democrat from Texas, who served as a United States representative from 1937 to 1949 and as a United States senator from 1949 to 1961. He spent six years as Senate majority leader, two as Senate minority leader, and two as Senate majority whip.

Johnson ran for the Democratic nomination in the 1960 presidential election. Although unsuccessful, he was chosen by Senator John F. Kennedy of Massachusetts to be his running mate. They went on to win the election and Johnson was sworn in as vice president on January 20, 1961. Two years and ten months later, on November 22, 1963, Johnson succeeded Kennedy as president following the latter's assassination. He ran for a full term in the 1964 election, winning by a landslide over Republican Arizona Senator Barry Goldwater. He was the first president from Texas, and is one of four people who have served as president, vice president, and in both houses of Congress. The other three who have served in all four elected offices were John Tyler, Andrew Johnson (no relation to Lyndon), and (Lyndon's successor as president) Richard Nixon.
