= Idaho Human Rights Day =

Holiday in the U.S. state of Idaho

- Official name: Martin Luther King, Jr. – Idaho Human Rights Day
- Type: State
- Significance: Honors Martin Luther King Jr. and promotes human rights
- Date: Third Monday in January
- 2024 date: January 15
- 2025 date: January 20
- 2026 date: January 19
- 2027 date: January 18
- Frequency: Annual

Idaho Human Rights Day is a state holiday recognized only in the U.S. state of Idaho. Governor Cecil Andrus signed compromise legislation on April 10, 1990, making Idaho the nation's 47th state to honor slain civil rights leader Martin Luther King Jr. with an official state holiday. The holiday, defined by the legislation as Martin Luther King, Jr. - Idaho Human Rights Day, is celebrated on the third Monday in January, the same day as the federal Martin Luther King, Jr. Day holiday, which was first celebrated in 1986.
