= International Lefthanders Day =

International day celebrating left-handed people

International Left-Handers Day
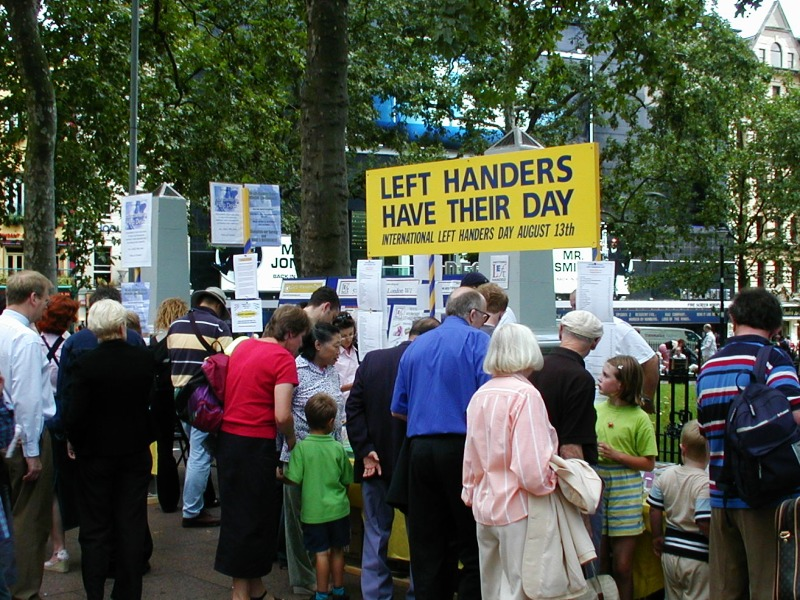
- Left Handers' Day, 2001
- Date: 13 August
- Next time: 13 August 2027
- Frequency: annual
- First time: 1976
- Started by: Dean R. Campbell, Left-handers Club

International Left Handers Day is an international day observed annually on August 13 to celebrate the uniqueness and differences of left-handed individuals. The day was first observed in 1976 by Dean R. Campbell, founder of the Left-handers Club. This day was established to raise awareness about the challenges and experiences faced by left-handed individuals in a predominantly right-handed world.

The holiday celebrates left-handed people's uniqueness and differences, a subset of humanity comprising seven to ten percent of the world's population. The day also spreads awareness on issues faced by left-handers, e.g. the importance of the special needs for left-handed children, and the likelihood for left-handers to develop schizophrenia.

Several media outlets and commercial associations have made one-off posts and compilations of accomplished left-handed people in recognition of the holiday.
