= Memorial Ceremony for the War Dead =

Official ceremony conducted annually on August 15, by the Japanese government

Coordinates: 35.6933°N 139.7496°E

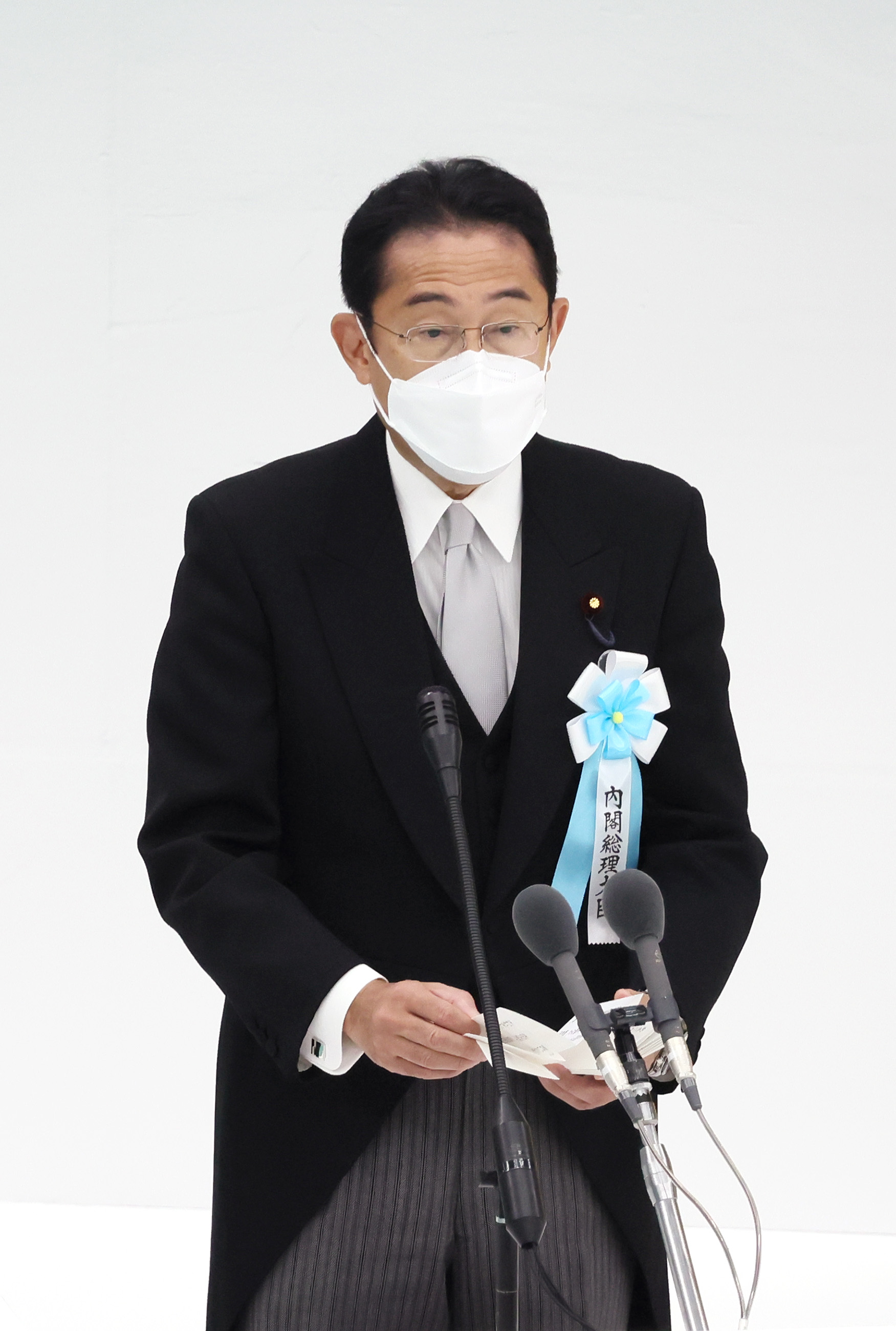
- Japanese Prime Minister Fumio Kishida addressing the attendees on August 15, 2022
- Official name: 全国戦没者追悼式
- Observed by: Japanese
- Type: National observance
- Significance: A memorial service for military and civilian deaths during WW2, observed on the same day the Japanese Emperor, addressed the Japanese people, to announce the unconditional surrender of the Japanese forces.
- Observances: Memorial service aired by national broadcaster NHK
- Date: August 15
- Next time: 15 August 2027
- Related to: National Liberation Day of Korea, Victory over Japan Day

The Memorial Ceremony for the War Dead (全国戦没者追悼式, Zenkoku Senbotsusha Tsuitōshiki') is an official, secular ceremony conducted annually on August 15, the day officially viewed as the end of the war in Japan, by the Japanese government at the Nippon Budokan in Tokyo, Japan. The ceremony is held to commemorate the victims of World War II. The first memorial ceremony was held on May 2, 1952.

== August 15 as End of War Day ==
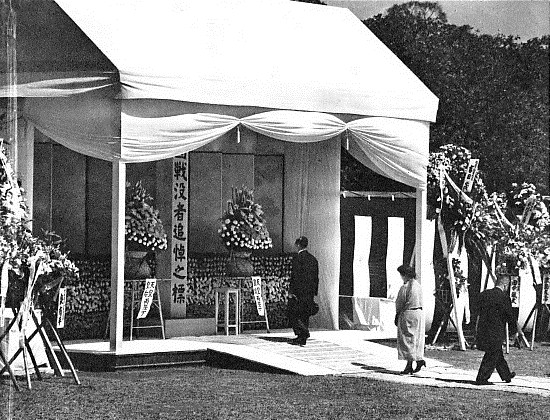
The first ceremony, held on May 2, 1952

In Japan, August 15 is officially and publicly recognised as the end of World War II. On this day Emperor Hirohito surrendered. The day is referred to in Japanese as shūsen-kinenbi (終戦記念日; "anniversary of the end of the war") or haisen-kinennbi (敗戦記念日; "anniversary of war loss"). Less formal names include shūsen-no-hi (終戦の日; "end of war day") or haisen-no-hi (敗戦の日; "loss of war day"), however the official name for the day is Senbotsusha o tsuitōshi heiwa o kinensuru hi (戦没者を追悼し平和を祈念する日; "day for mourning of war dead and praying for peace"). This official name was adopted in 1982 by an ordinance issued by the Japanese government which also requires the government to hold the Memorial Ceremony for the War Dead on this day.

"The day for mourning of war dead and praying for peace" is not one of the sixteen legally established Japanese public holidays.

== Overview ==
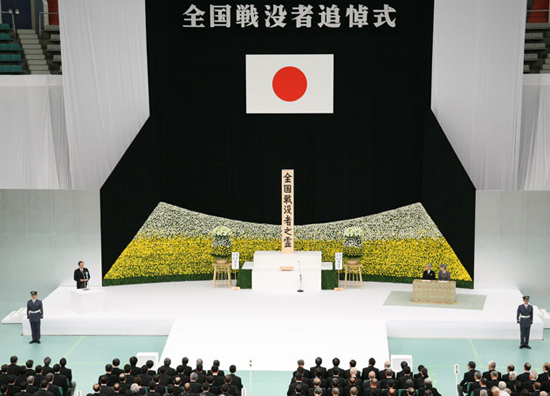
The National Memorial Service for War Dead, at the indoor arena of the Nippon Budokan, Chiyoda ward, Tokyo, August 15, 2008

By decision of the Third Yoshida Cabinet (Prime Minister Shigeru Yoshida), on 2 May 1952 the Emperor Shōwa and Empress Kōjun of Japan held a memorial service for war dead in Shinjuku Gyoen. The next such service was held on March 28, 1959. In 1963 the date was moved to August 15, the day the Hirohito surrender broadcast (玉音放送, Gyokuon-hōsō) had aired in 1945.

In the following year, the service was held at Yasukuni Shrine, and in 1965 it was moved to the Budokan where it is still held today. In 1982 the National Diet enacted a law fixing the date of the ceremony to August 15. The service is meant to honor both Japanese military casualties and Japanese civilian victims of war, over 30 million deceased individuals in total.

The event is organized by the Ministry of Health, Labour, and Welfare. The Emperor and Empress are always in attendance, as well as representatives of business, labor, political, and religious organisations, and bereaved families. Roughly 6,000 attendees were recorded in 2007.

The service is scheduled at 11:51 am for one hour, and is broadcast by the Japan Broadcasting Corporation.

No invited leader has ever absented himself from the memorial, including those who have criticized visits to Yasukuni Shrine. There has never been a protest from foreign powers about the memorial.

== Order of service ==
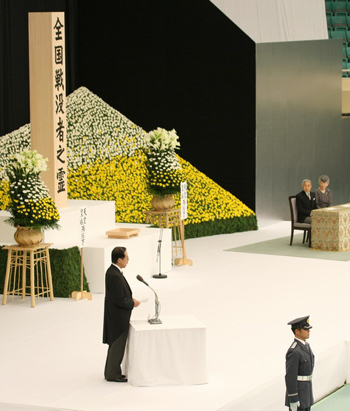
1. The Japanese Prime Minister addressing the attendees on August 15, 2008.
  Opening
2. Entrance of the Emperor and Empress of Japan
3. Anthem: Kimigayo
4. Address by Prime Minister of Japan
5. Moment of silence (usually at noon)
6. Address by the Emperor
7. Addresses by Speaker of the House of Representatives, President of the House of Councillors, Chief Justice of the Supreme Court and Representative for the Bereaved
8. Exit of the Emperor and Empress of Japan
9. Offering of Flowers
10. Closing

== See also ==
- Surrender of Japan
