= National Airborne Day =

Observance in the USA

- Observed by: United States of America
- Date: August 16
- Next time: 16 August 2025
- Frequency: annual

National Airborne Day is a day designated by the United States Congress to honor the nation's airborne forces of the Armed Forces. It was created in 2002 by George W. Bush.

== History ==
August 16, 1940 marked the first official Army parachute jump, validating the innovative concept of inserting United States ground combat forces behind a battle line by parachute.

On August 14, 2002 President George W. Bush issued the following proclamation:

The history of airborne forces began after World War I, when Brigadier General William Mitchell first conceived the idea of parachuting troops into combat. Eventually, under the leadership of Major William Lee at Fort Benning, Georgia, members of the Parachute Test Platoon pioneered methods of combat jumping in 1940. In November 1942, members of the 2nd Battalion, 509th Parachute Infantry Regiment, conducted America's first combat jump, leaping from a C-47 aircraft behind enemy lines in North Africa. This strategy revolutionized combat and established airborne forces as a key component of our military.

During World War II, airborne tactics were critical to the success of important missions, including the D-Day invasion at Normandy, the Battle of the Bulge, the invasion of Southern France, and many others. In Korea and Vietnam, airborne soldiers played a critical combat role, as well as in later conflicts and peacekeeping operations, including Panama, Grenada, Desert Storm, Haiti, Somalia, and the Balkans. Most recently, airborne forces were vital to liberating the people of Afghanistan from the repressive and violent Taliban regime; and these soldiers continue to serve proudly around the world in the global coalition against terrorism.

The elite airborne ranks include prestigious groups such as the 173rd Airborne Brigade Combat Team, "Sky Soldiers," 82nd Airborne Division, "All American," and the "Screaming Eagles" of the 101st Airborne Division (Air Assault). Airborne forces have also been represented in the former 11th, 13th, and 17th Airborne Divisions and numerous other Airborne, glider and air assault units and regiments. Paratroopers in the Army's XVIII Airborne Corps, the 75th Infantry (Ranger) Regiment and other Special Forces units conduct swift and effective operations in defense of peace and freedom.

Airborne combat continues to be driven by the bravery and daring spirit of sky soldiers. Often called into action with little notice, these forces have earned an enduring reputation for dedication, excellence, and honor. As we face the challenges of a new era, I encourage all people to recognize the contributions of these courageous soldiers to our Nation and the world.

Now, therefore, I, George W. Bush, President of the United States of America, by virtue of the authority vested in me by the Constitution and laws of the United States, do hereby proclaim August 16, 2002, as National Airborne Day. As we commemorate the first official Army parachute jump on August 16, 1940, I encourage all Americans to join me in honoring the thousands of soldiers, past and present, who have served in an airborne capacity. I call upon all citizens to observe this day with appropriate programs, ceremonies, and activities.

In Witness Whereof, I have hereunto set my hand this fourteenth day of August, in the year of our Lord two thousand two, and of the Independence of the United States of America the two hundred and twenty-seventh.

George W. Bush

On August 3, 2009 the Senate recognized National Airborne Day with Senate Resolution 235.

== See also ==
- Paratrooper
- Airborne forces
- 82nd Airborne Division
- 2nd Ranger Battalion (United States)
