= Freshpair =

Online retailer of underwear

- Company type: Privately held company
- Industry: Intimate Apparel Retail
- Founded: 2000; 26 years ago
- Headquarters: Pembroke Pines, Florida, United States
- Products: Underwear, Shapewear, Lingerie, and Performance
- Production output: Worldwide
- Website: www.freshpair.com

Freshpair is an American online retailer of men’s underwear and women's intimate apparel headquartered in Fairfield, New Jersey.

== History ==
Freshpair was founded in 2000 out of a one-bedroom apartment and moved into its New York office in 2004.

== National Underwear Day ==
In an effort to promote underwear, Freshpair founded National Underwear Day on August 5, 2003. Employing underwear models, it advertised the event in heavily congested areas of New York, including Times Square, City Hall, and the New York Stock Exchange. Following a 2012 company rebrand, Freshpair promoted National Underwear Day by launching a pop-up shop near Columbus Circle. In 2013, Freshpair advertised the event in Times Square by attempting to break the Guinness World Record for largest gathering of people in their underwear.

== Partnership ==
Freshpair participates in the annual Underwear Run in Manhattan, sponsored by Aquaphor. In 2012, a record-breaking 500 people participated in the Underwear Run's "Celebrate America" theme.

In 2013, Freshpair partnered with soccer player Cristiano Ronaldo to launch his underwear collection CR7. Ronaldo collaborated with designer Richard Chai and Scandinavia manufacturer JBS for each line.

== Recognition ==
- 2009: Freshpair received the Responsys Lead Forum Award.
- 2010: Freshpair received the CJYou award for Innovator of the Year.
- 2011, 2012: made the Hot 100 list by Internet Retailer.
- 2012: Freshpair received the PivotLink Excellence Award in Marketing Optimization.
