= Secret Society of Happy People =

American organization

- Abbreviation: SOHP
- Formation: August 1998; 27 years ago
- Founder: Pamela Gail Johnson
- Location: Irving, Texas
- Website: sohp.com

Secret Society of Happy People (SOHP) is an American organization that celebrates the expression of happiness. Founded in August 1998, the society encourages thousands of members from all around the globe to recognize their happy moments and think about happiness in their daily life.

== Purpose ==
The Secret Society of Happy People supports people who want to share their happiness despite the ones who don't want to hear happy news. Their mottos include "Happiness Happens" and "Don’t Even Think of Raining on My Parade".

The main purpose of the Society is to stimulate people's right to express their happiness "as loud as they want".

== Reception ==
The Society was founded in August 1998 in Irving, Texas, by Pamela Gail Johnson. In December 1998, it gained international reception, when it challenged advice columnist Ann Landers for discouraging people from writing happy holiday newsletters enclosed with their holiday cards. In a letter to Landers, Johnson demanded an apology "to the millions of people you made feel bad for wanting to share their happy news." The Society's campaign persuaded Landers to change her advice on holiday letters, one of the rare occasions the columnist had a change of heart. Within the next few years the Society grew bigger being supported by thousands of fans from more than 34 countries.

== Founder ==
Pamela Gail Johnson founded the Secret Society of Happy People with the main idea of creating a "safe place" where people can share their happy moments, without being discouraged by the parade rainers. Since 1998 she has been managing the Society by writing posts, writing the newsletter, updating social media information and answering fan's questions on her blog Ask Pamela Gail: Where Happiness Meets Reality. Each blog post is formed as an answer to the member’s questions submitted through the website. The purpose is to give people advice for handling their unhappy moments and learning the lesson out of each and every one of them. The column is posted weekly. Pamela is also the author of The Secret Society of Happy People’s Thirty-One Types of Happiness Guide released in November 2012 and Don’t Even Think of Raining on My Parade: Adventures of the Secret Society of Happy People.

== Events ==
=== Happiness Happens Day ===
In 1999 the Society declared August 8 as the "Admit You're Happy Day", now known as the "Happiness Happens Day". The idea was inspired by the event that happened the previous year on the same date- the first member joined the Society. In 1998 the Society asked the governors in all 50 states for a proclamation. Nineteen of them sent proclamations.

=== Happiness Happens Month ===
Celebration of happiness was expanded in 2000, and thanks to the support of not-so-secretly-happy members from around the world, the Society declared August as Happiness Happens Month. The purpose of Happiness Happens Day and Month is to share happiness and encourage people to talk and think about happiness.

=== HappyThon ===
Every year, the Society organizes an online social media event known as HappyThon, on Happiness Happens Day. The aim of this event is to send inspirational messages via social networks, emails or texts, share happy moments, philosophy, quotes, etc. HappyThon is the first online social media event that promotes happiness around the world.

Since 1998 the Society have been organizing voting and announcing the Happiest Events and Moments of the Year. Before the end of the century, a vote for 100 of the Happiest Events, Inventions and Social Changes of the Century was organized. In the third week of January the Society hosted Hunt for Happiness Week. They asked the current governors for proclamation, and got it by seven of them.
