= Victory Day (United States) =

Holiday observed in the United States

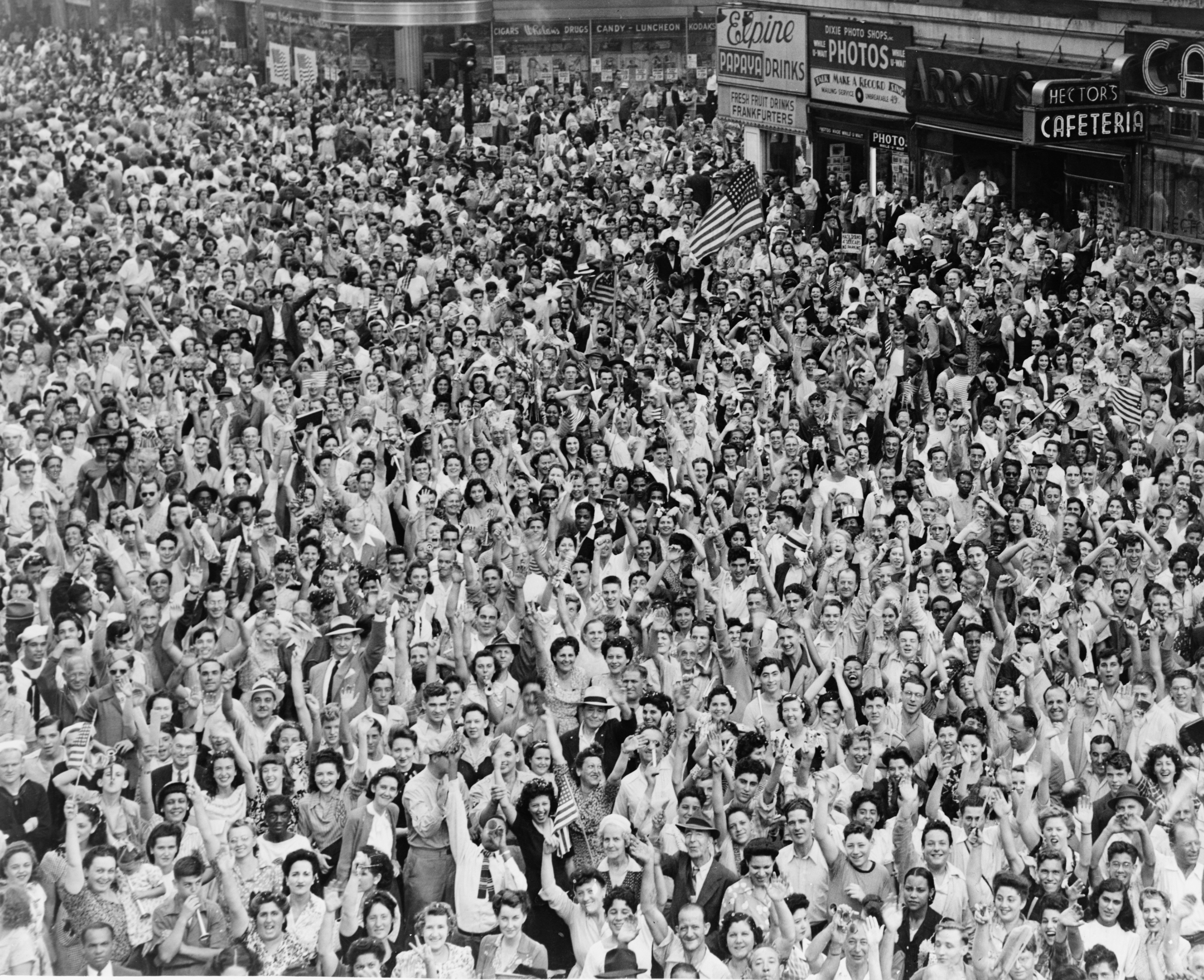
- Crowds celebrating V-J Day in Times Square
- Also called: Victory Over Japan Day, VJ Day, World War II Memorial Day (Arkansas)
- Observed by: United States (Rhode Island)
- Type: Rhode Island state holiday, state offices closed
- Date: Second Monday in August (Rhode Island, 1967-present); August 14 (Rhode Island, 1948-1966)
- 2025 date: August 11
- 2026 date: August 10
- 2027 date: August 9
- 2028 date: August 14
- Frequency: annual

Victory Day is a holiday observed in the United States state of Rhode Island with state offices closed on the second Monday of August. Rhode Island and Arkansas, which stopped celebrating the day in 1975, were the only two states to ever celebrate the holiday, though Arkansas's name for the holiday was "World War II Memorial Day."

The holiday celebrates the conclusion of World War II and is related to Victory over Japan Day in the United Kingdom. Rhode Island retains the date as a formal state holiday in tribute to the number of sailors it sent and lost in the Pacific front. More than one in ten of the states' residents served in the war, and 2,340 (671 Navy or Marines) were killed. In 2015, the U.S. Space & Rocket Center in Huntsville, Alabama honored 500 veterans on the 70th anniversary of the end of the war.

== History ==
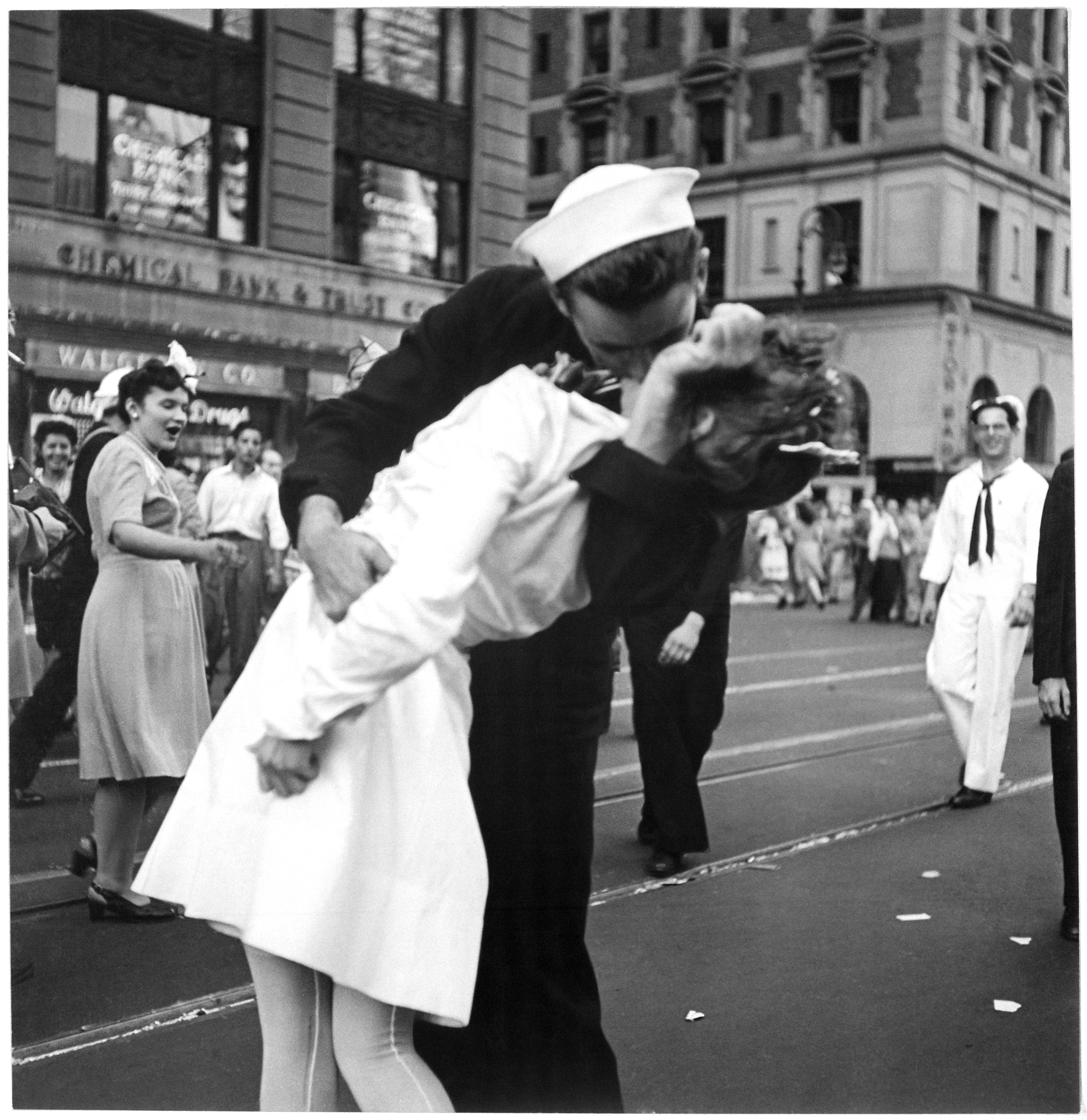
Scene made famous by Life magazine photograph

Victory Day has commemorated the anniversary of Japan's surrender to the Allies in 1945 which ended World War II. The atomic bombs dropped on Hiroshima on August 6 and Nagasaki on August 9, and the Soviet Union's invasion of Manchuria in the previous week led to the eventual surrender. President Truman's announcement of the surrender started mass celebrations across the United States, which was when he declared September 2 as the official "VJ Day" in 1945. In 1975, the holiday was abolished at the Arkansas state level leaving Rhode Island as the only state in the U.S. where the holiday is a legal holiday. Rhode Island has observed this day since 1948. Initially observed on August 14, the Rhode Island General Assembly enacted legislation in 1966 to observe the holiday on the second Monday in August annually.

According to WPRI-TV, Rhode Island has had debates over whether to retain the state holiday, with opponents citing Japan's growing "economic might" in the 1980s and offense to Japanese Americans, but all efforts to remove or rename the holiday have been defeated by veterans, "traditionalists", and labor unions.

== See also ==
- Public holidays in the United States
- Federal holidays in the United States
- Victory over Japan Day
