= Family Day =

Public holiday

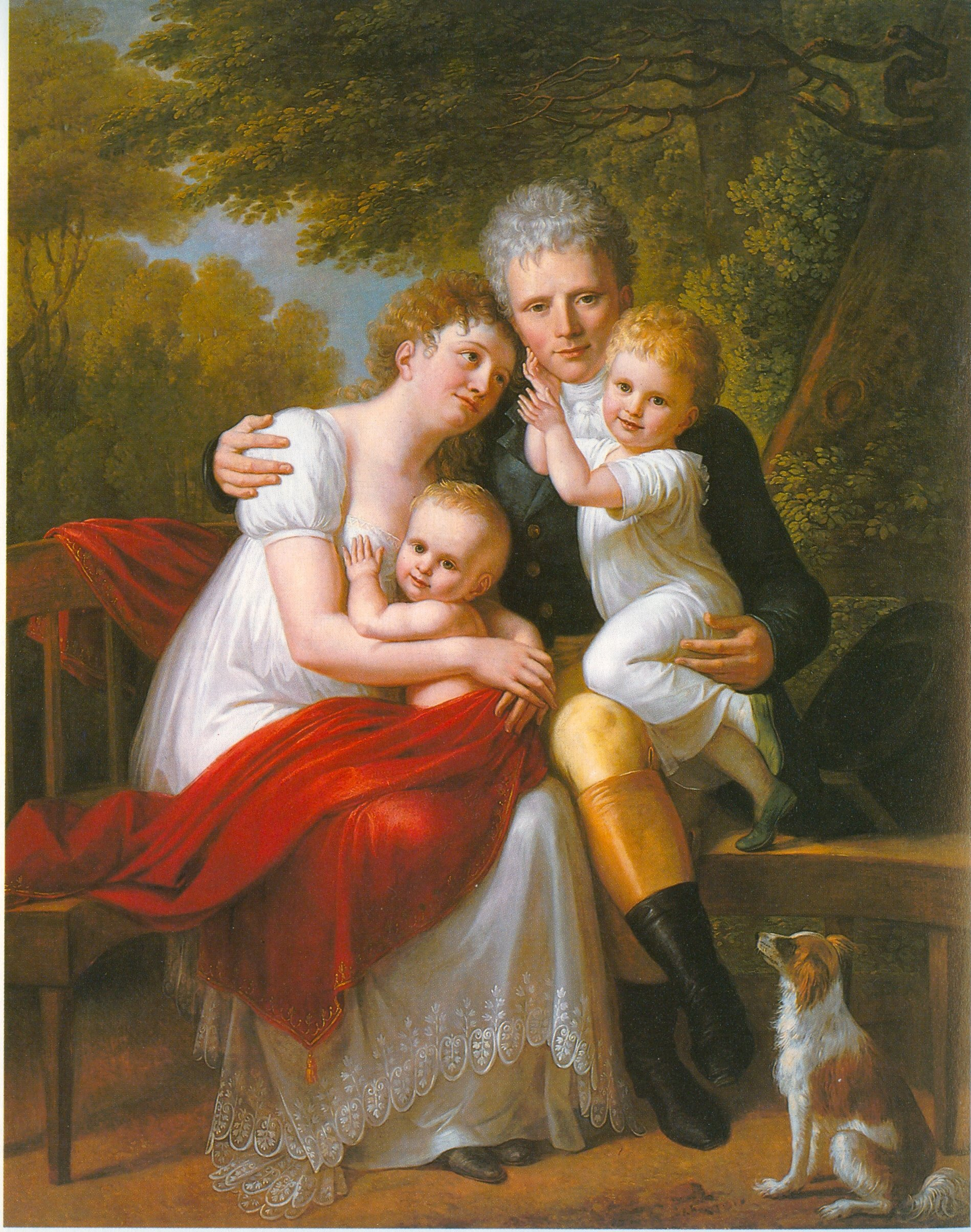
- Portrait of Count Ferdinand von Zeppelin and his family by Philipp Friedrich von Hetsch
- Date: Easter + 1 day, December 26, first Tuesday in November, fourth Friday in November

Family Day is a public holiday in the countries of Angola, Israel, Namibia, South Africa, Uruguay, Vanuatu, and Vietnam; in the Canadian provinces of Alberta, British Columbia, New Brunswick, Ontario, and Saskatchewan; in the American states of Arizona and Nevada; and as the second day of Songkran in Thailand. It was formerly observed in the Australian Capital Territory from 2007 to 2017.

== Australia ==
=== Australian Capital Territory ===
Family and Community Day was celebrated on the first Tuesday of November from 2007 to 2009, coinciding with the Melbourne Cup. This public holiday was declared in 2007. Andrew Barr, then ACT Minister for Industrial Relations, stated the purpose of the new public holiday was:

"...to enable workers to take a break from their hectic work and to spend some quality time with their family and friends. ... Australians do work the longest hours of any country in the western world. We do deserve a break."

In the years 2010–2016, the date was moved to the first Monday of the September/October school holidays. Where the first Monday of the school holidays falls on the ACT Labour Day public holiday (First Monday in October), the holiday is moved to the second Monday of the ACT school holidays.

From 2018, Family and Community Day will no longer be a public holiday in the ACT. Replacing it is Reconciliation Day, held on the first Monday on or after May 27.

== Angola ==
Celebrated on December 25.

== Canada ==
Nearly two-thirds of Canadians reside in a province that observes a statutory holiday on the third Monday of February. The holiday is called Family Day in five provinces (Alberta, British Columbia, New Brunswick, Ontario and Saskatchewan), Louis Riel Day in Manitoba, Islander Day in Prince Edward Island, and Heritage Day in Nova Scotia. There is no federally established Family Day.

This holiday was first observed in Alberta in 1990, followed by Saskatchewan in 2007 and Ontario in 2008. On May 28, 2012, the BC government announced that Family Day would be observed on the second Monday in February each year, starting February 11, 2013. In February 2018, the BC government announced that Family Day would move to the third Monday in February from 2019 onward, aligning the holiday with other Canadian provinces. In April 2017, the NB government announced the family statutory holiday to begin in February 2018.

In at least British Columbia, the decision to add this public holiday was in part due to the lengthy gap between the New Year's Day and Good Friday public holidays. Family Day is a time for British Columbians to pause, connect, and enjoy time with their loved ones.

Otherwise, Canadian provinces have a public holiday at least every other month.

Family Day is unrelated to National Family Week, a campaign put on each October by the Canadian Association of Family Resource Programs.

== Israel ==
In the 1990s, the last day of Shevat was declared Family Day (Hebrew: יום המשפחה) in Israel.

== Namibia ==
Family Day is observed on 26th December and is distinguished from Christmas, allowing a focus on celebrating Christmas the day before, and a focus on spending time with family on the 26th.

== South Africa ==
After 1995, Easter Monday was renamed Family Day.

== United States ==
Family Day is a state holiday in Nevada, celebrated on the day after Thanksgiving, i.e. the Friday following the fourth Thursday in November.

American Family Day is a state holiday in Arizona and has been celebrated on the first Sunday in August since 1978.

== Uruguay ==
In Uruguay, the public holiday on December 25 is officially known as Family Day (Día de la Familia) rather than Christmas, for the sake of secularism.

== Vanuatu ==
Family Day in Vanuatu is celebrated annually on December 26, traditionally Boxing Day, as a day on which school and work are suspended to spend the day giving thanks for and enjoying time with one's family, often by engaging in civic and religious events and a festive meal.

== Vietnam ==
Vietnamese Family Day (Vietnamese: Ngày gia đình Việt Nam.) occurs on June 28 each year, having been established in 2001. Family-oriented activities and events are organised throughout the country, although it is not a public holiday.

On Vietnamese Family Day, gift-giving is an important tradition. It serves as a meaningful expression of love and helps create lasting memories. People meticulously prepare and exchange thoughtful gifts, not only within their own families but also for neighbors and friends. However, the true essence of gift-giving lies in the spirit of sincerity and genuine appreciation.
