= Patrick Grant (composer) =

American classical composer

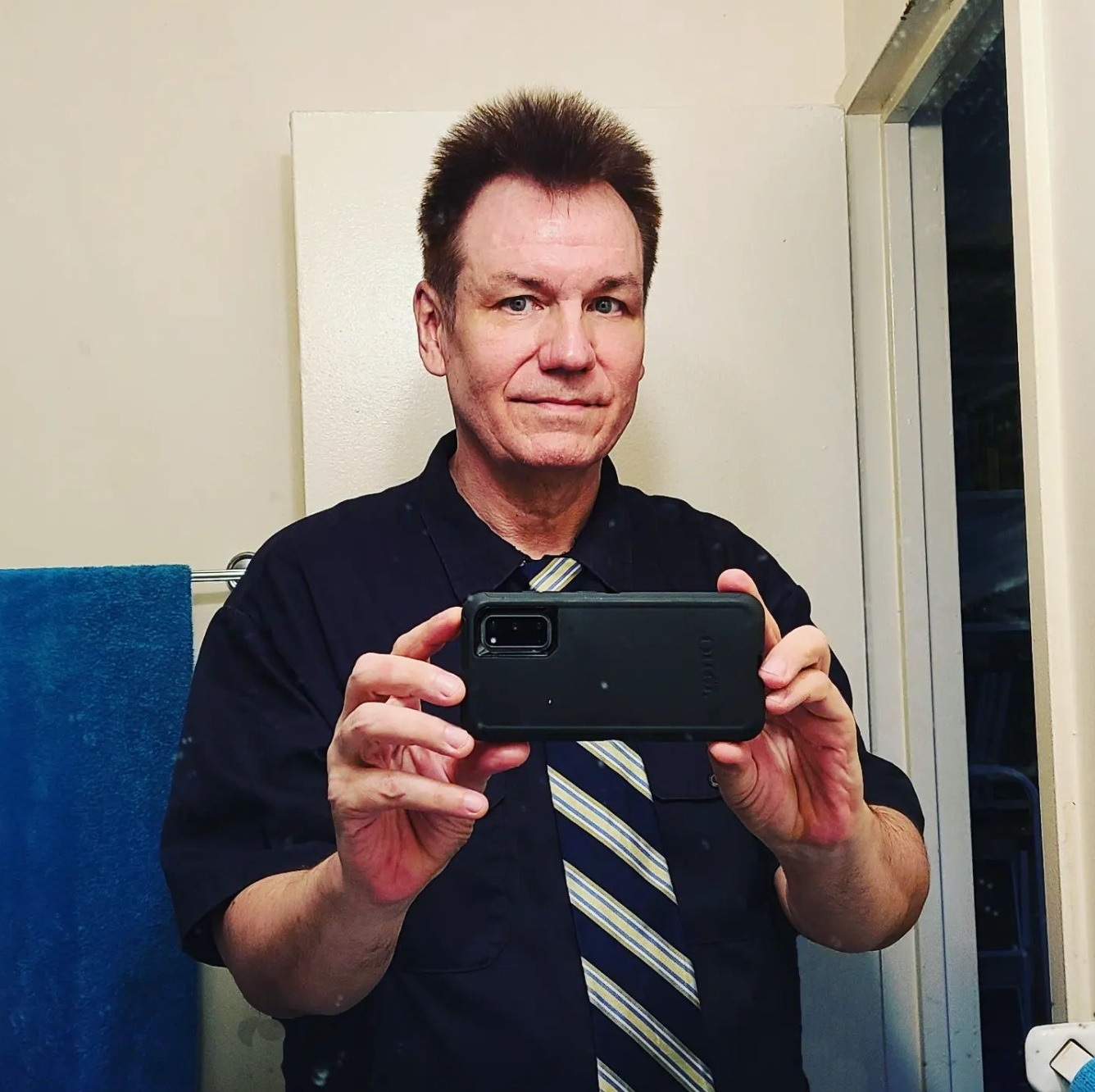
- Born: 1963 (age 62–63); Detroit, Michigan
- Occupation: Composer

Patrick Grant (born 1963) is an American composer living and working in New York City. His works are a synthesis of classical, popular, and world musical styles that have found place in concert halls, film, theater, dance, and visual media over three continents. Over the last three decades, his music has moved from post-punk and classically bent post-minimal styles, through Balinese-inspired gamelan and microtonality, to ambient, electronic soundscapes involving many layers of acoustic and electronically amplified instruments. Throughout its evolution, his music has consistently contained a "...a driving and rather harsh energy redolent of rock, as well as a clean sense of melodicism...intricate cross-rhythms rarely let up..." Known as a producer and co-producer of live musical events, he has presented many concerts of his own and other composers, including a 2013 Guinness World Record-breaking performance of 175 electronic keyboards in NYC.

He is the creator of International Strange Music Day (August 24) and the pioneer of the electric guitar procession Tilted Axes.
