= National Honey Bee Day =

American awareness day

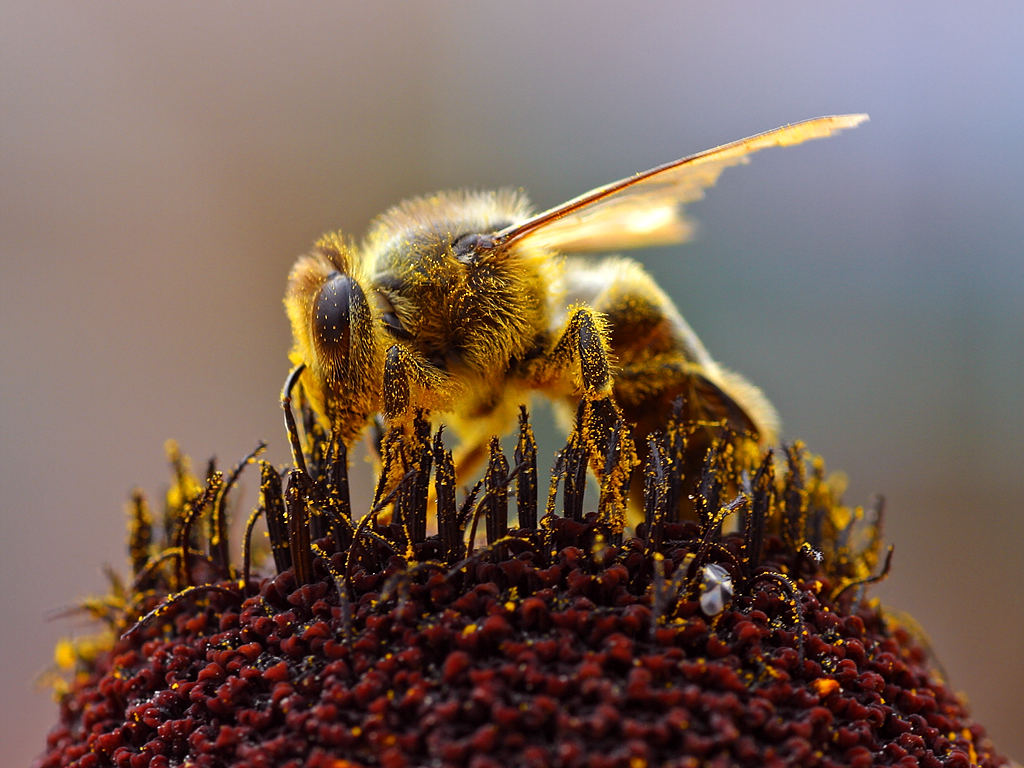
- Significance: Honoring honey bees and beekeepers
- Date: Third Saturday in August
- 2025 date: August 16
- 2026 date: August 15
- 2027 date: August 21
- 2028 date: August 19
- Frequency: annual

National Honey Bee Day (formerly National Honey Bee Awareness Day) is an awareness day when beekeepers, beekeeping clubs and associations, and honey bee enthusiasts from across the United States celebrate honey bees and recognize their contribution to humans' everyday lives as a means of protecting this critical species. National Honey Bee Day also pays homage to beekeepers, whose labors ensure there are well-managed, healthy bees to pollinate crops.

According to its organizers, the National Honey Bee Day program started with a simple concept:

Bring together beekeepers, bee associations, as well as other interested groups to connect with the communities to advance beekeeping. By working together and harnessing the efforts that so many already accomplish, and [by] using a united effort one day a year, the rewards and message is magnified many times over. We encourage bee associations, individuals, and other groups to get involved. The program is free and open to all.

The event was started in 2009 by a small group of beekeepers who petitioned for and obtained a formal proclamation by the USDA honoring honey bees and beekeeping. In 2010, a non-profit, Pennsylvania Apiculture Inc. was organized to facilitate and promote the observance better. The original observance date was August 22, 2009 (the fourth Saturday of August), but since then, it has settled permanently on the third Saturday of August.

National Honey Bee Day is managed by HoneyLove.org, a Los Angeles-based honey bee educational non-profit.
