= Baloch-Pashtun Unity Day =

International celebration day of Balochis and Pashtuns

Baloch-Pashtun Unity Day (Pashto: د پښتنو او بلوڅو د پیوستون ورځ) is an international day celebrated by Balochis and Pashtuns to express unity and brotherhood to one-another. The day is celebrated yearly on August 31.

== History ==
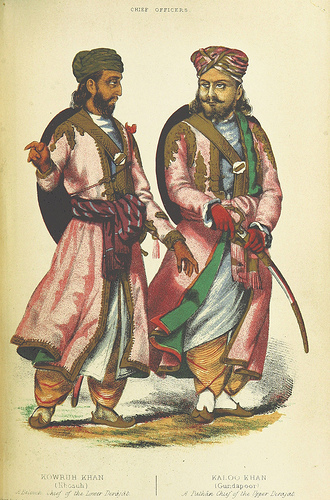
Kowruh Khan (left) the leader of the Balochs and Kalu Khan (right) the leader of the Pashtun in Derajat, in the middle of the 19th century.

The day has been observed since 1949 (77 years ago).
