= List of holidays commemorating individuals =

This is a list of government-sanctioned holidays commemorating individuals.

Person	Holiday	Observing government	Date
Bhanubhakta Acharya	Bhanu Jayanti	Nepal, India	13 July
B. R. Ambedkar	Ambedkar Jayanti	India	14 April
Susan B. Anthony	Susan B. Anthony Day	United States	15 February
Errol Barrow	Errol Barrow Day	Barbados	21 January
Netaji Subhas Chandra Bose	Netaji Jayanti	India	23 January
Robert Burns	Burns Night (or Day)	Scotland	25 January
Cesar Chavez	Cesar Chavez Day	United States	31 March
Jesus Christ	Christmas	Various	25 December
Christopher Columbus	Columbus Day	Various	second Monday in October (US); 12 October (elsewhere)
Leif Erikson	Leif Erikson Day	United States, parts of Canada	9 October
Guy Fawkes	Guy Fawkes Night (or Day)	United Kingdom	5 November
Mahatma Gandhi	Gandhi Jayanti	India	2 October
Martin Luther King Jr.	Martin Luther King Jr. Day	United States	third Monday in January
Fred Korematsu	Fred Korematsu Day	Parts of the United States	30 January
Abraham Lincoln	Lincoln's Birthday	Parts of the United States	12 February
Nelson Mandela	Mandela Day	Various	18 July
Harvey Milk	Harvey Milk Day	California / United States / New York	22 May
John Muir	John Muir Day	California	21 April
Barack Obama	Obama Day	Kenya, parts of the United States	6 November
Rosa Parks	Rosa Parks Day	Four states of the United States	4 February (California and Missouri); 1 December (Ohio and Oregon)
Maharana Pratap	Pratap Jayanti	Rajasthan	9 May
Casimir Pulaski	General Pulaski Memorial Day	United States	11 October
Casimir Pulaski	Casimir Pulaski Day	Illinois, Wisconsin public schools, etc.	first Monday in March
Shivaji	Shiv Jayanti	Maharashtra	19 February
Mother Teresa	Mother Teresa Day	Albania	5 September
Harriet Tubman	Harriet Tubman Day	United States	10 March
Pierre-Théodore Verhaegen	Saint Verhaegen	Brussels	20 November
Queen Victoria	Victoria Day	Canada	last Monday before 25 May
George Washington	Washington's Birthday	United States	third Monday in February
Wright brothers	Wright Brothers Day	United States	17 December
Malcolm X	Malcolm X Day	Berkeley, California	either Malcolm's birthday on 19 May or the third Sunday of May
