= Federal holidays in the United States =

U.S. government holidays

- Public • Paid • Federal • Observance • School • Hallmark
- Observed by: U.S. government
- Type: Federal
- Observances: New Year's Day; Birthday of Martin Luther King, Jr.; Washington's Birthday; Memorial Day; Juneteenth; Independence Day; Labor Day; Columbus Day; Veterans Day; Thanksgiving Day; Christmas Day

Federal holidays in the United States are 11 calendar dates designated by the U.S. federal government as holidays. On these days non-essential U.S. federal government offices are closed, and federal employees are paid for the day off.

Federal holidays are designated by the United States Congress in Title V of the United States Code (5 U.S.C. § 6103). Congress only has authority to create holidays for federal institutions (including federally-owned properties), employees, and the District of Columbia. As a general rule of courtesy, custom, and sometimes regulation, other institutions, such as banks, businesses, schools, and the financial markets, may be closed on federal holidays. In various parts of the country, state and city holidays may be observed concurrently with federal holidays.

== History ==
The history of national holidays in the United States dates back to June 28, 1870, when Congress created national holidays "to correspond with similar laws of States around the District...and...in every State of the Union." Although at first applicable only to federal employees in Washington, D.C., Congress extended coverage in 1885 to all federal employees.

The original four holidays in 1870 were:

- New Year's Day
- Independence Day
- Thanksgiving Day
- Christmas Day

New Years Day celebrates the beginning of the new calendar year on January 1. The July 4th Independence Day commemorates the United States Declaration of Independence in 1776.

On October 3, 1789, at the request of the U.S. Congress, President George Washington issued a Thanksgiving proclamation designating November 26, 1789 as a day of "public thanksgiving and prayer" for the "People of the United States". Thanksgiving has been proclaimed in the U.S. for various months and days of the week, including March, August, September, November, December, and on Sundays. Since 1941, it has been celebrated on the fourth Thursday in November.

Celebrated on December 25 around the world, Christmas is the day that Christians remember the birth and incarnation of Jesus Christ. In the United States, Christmas Day as a federal or public holiday is sometimes objected to by various non-Christians, usually due to its ties with Christianity. In December 1999, the Western Division of the United States District Court for the Southern District of Ohio, in the case Ganulin v. United States, denied the charge that Christmas Day's federal status violated the Establishment Clause of the Constitution, ruling that "the Christmas holiday has become largely secularized", and that "by giving federal employees a paid vacation day on Christmas, the government is doing no more than recognizing the cultural significance of the holiday".

George Washington's Birthday became a federal holiday in 1879. In 1888 and 1894, respectively, Decoration Day (later Memorial Day) and Labor Day were created. Armistice Day was established in 1938 to honor the end of World War I, and the scope of the holiday was expanded to honor American soldiers who fought in World War II and the Korean War when it was renamed Veterans Day in 1954, commemorating all veterans.

In 1968, the Uniform Monday Holiday Act gave several holidays "floating" dates so that they always fall on a Monday, and also established Columbus Day.

In 1983, President Ronald Reagan signed the bill that created Martin Luther King Jr. Day. It was first observed three years later, although some states resisted making it a state holiday. It was finally celebrated both nationally and by each of the states in 2000. King's birthday is January 15.

On June 17, 2021, President Joe Biden signed the law that made June 19 a federal holiday. Officially designated as "Juneteenth National Independence Day", Juneteenth commemorates June 19, 1865, symbolic of the ending of slavery in the United States at the conclusion of the American Civil War.

== List of federal holidays ==
Most of the 11 U.S. federal holidays are also state holidays. Five of the "floating" date holidays always fall on a Monday; the remaining floating holiday, Thanksgiving, is always on a Thursday. The rest are on fixed dates. A fixed date holiday that falls on a weekend (Saturday and Sunday) is usually observed for federal employees on the closest weekday: a holiday falling on a Saturday is observed on the preceding Friday, while a holiday falling on a Sunday is observed on the succeeding Monday. The official names come from the statute that defines holidays for federal employees.

Date	Official Name	Date established	Details
January 1 (Fixed date)	New Year's Day	June 28, 1870	Celebrates the beginning of the Gregorian calendar year. Festivities include counting down to 12:00 midnight on the preceding night, New Year's Eve, often with fireworks displays and parties. The ball drop at Times Square in New York City, broadcast live on television nationwide, has become a national New Year's festivity. Serves as the traditional end of the Christmas and holiday season.
January 15–21 (Third Monday)	Birthday of Martin Luther King, Jr.	November 2, 1983	Honors Dr. Martin Luther King Jr., a civil rights movement leader who was born on January 15, 1929. Some municipalities hold parades, and since the 1994 King Holiday and Service Act, it has become a day of citizen action volunteer service, sometimes referred to as the MLK Day of Service. The holiday is observed on the third Monday of January, and is combined with other holidays in several states.
February 15–21 (Third Monday)	Washington's Birthday	1879	Honors George Washington, Founding Father, commander of the Continental Army, and the first U.S. president, who was born on February 22, 1732. In 1968, the Uniform Monday Holiday Act shifted the date of the commemoration from February 22 to the third Monday in February, meaning the observed holiday never falls on Washington's actual birthday. Because of this, combined with the fact that Abraham Lincoln's birthday falls on February 12, many refer to this holiday as "Presidents' Day" and consider it a day honoring all American presidents. The official name has never been changed.
May 25–31 (Last Monday)	Memorial Day	1968	Honors U.S. military personnel who have fought and died while serving in the United States Armed Forces. Many municipalities hold parades with marching bands and an overall military theme, and the day marks the unofficial beginning of the summer season. The holiday is observed on the last Monday in May.
June 19 (Fixed date)	Juneteenth National Independence Day	June 17, 2021	Commemorates the emancipation of enslaved people in the United States on the anniversary of the 1865 date when emancipation was announced in Galveston, Texas. Celebratory traditions often include readings of the Emancipation Proclamation, singing traditional songs, rodeos, street fairs, family reunions, cookouts, park parties, historical reenactments, and Miss Juneteenth contests.
July 4 (Fixed date)	Independence Day	1870 (unpaid holiday for federal employees) 1938 (federal holiday)	Celebrates the 1776 adoption of the Declaration of Independence, from British colonial rule. Parades, picnics, and cookouts are held during the day and fireworks are set off at night. On the day before this holiday, the stock market trading session ends three hours early.
September 1–7 (First Monday)	Labor Day	1894	Honors and recognizes the American labor movement. Over half of Americans celebrate Labor Day as the unofficial end of summer. Roughly 40% of employers require some employees to work on the holiday.
October 8–14 (Second Monday)	Columbus Day	1968	Honors Christopher Columbus, whose voyages to the Americas from 1492 to 1504 marked the beginning of large scale European colonization of the Americas. The holiday is observed on the second Monday in October, and is one of two federal holidays where stock market trading is permitted. It celebrates Italian and Spanish culture and heritage.
November 11 (Fixed date)	Veterans Day	1938	Honors all veterans of the United States armed forces. It is observed on November 11 due to its origins as Armistice Day, recalling the end of World War I on that date in 1918. Major hostilities of World War I were formally ended at 11:00, of the 11th day, of the 11th month of 1918, when the Armistice with Germany went into effect. It became Veterans Day after World War II. It is one of two federal holidays where stock market trading is permitted.
November 22–28 (Fourth Thursday)	Thanksgiving Day	1870 (as yearly appointed holiday) 1941 (received permanent observation date)	Traditionally celebrates the giving of thanks for the autumn harvest, and commonly includes the sharing of a turkey dinner. Several large parades are broadcast on television, and football games are often held. The holiday is observed on the fourth Thursday in November. On the day after this holiday, the stock market trading session ends three hours early.
December 25 (Fixed date)	Christmas Day	1870	The most widely celebrated holiday of the Christian year, Christmas is traditionally observed as a commemoration of the birth of Jesus Christ. It is commonly celebrated by Christians and some non-Christians with various religious and secular traditions. On the day before this holiday, the stock market trading session ends three hours early.: In some years where December 25 falls on a Thursday, Friday, Saturday, Sunday, or Monday, various presidents have issued executive orders declaring a one-time holiday on either Christmas Eve (December 24) or the Day after Christmas (December 26), to provide federal workers with a longer weekend.

Inauguration Day, held on January 20 every four years following a quadrennial presidential election, if not falling on the Birthday of Martin Luther King, Jr., is considered a paid holiday for federal employees in the Washington, D.C., area by the Office of Personnel Management. It is not considered a federal holiday in the United States equivalent to the eleven holidays mentioned above.

Although many states recognize most or all federal holidays as state holidays, the federal government cannot enact laws to compel them to do so. States can recognize other days as state holidays that are not federal holidays. For example, the State of Texas recognizes all federal holidays except Columbus Day, and recognizes the Friday after Thanksgiving, Christmas Eve, and the day after Christmas as state holidays.

Texas does not follow the federal rule of closing either the Friday before, if a holiday falls on a Saturday, or the Monday after if a holiday falls on a Sunday. Offices are open on those Fridays or Mondays. Texas has "partial staffing holidays", such as March 2, which is Texas Independence Day, and "optional holidays", such as Good Friday.

Private employers are not required to observe federal or state holidays, the key exception being federally-chartered banks. Some private employers, often by a union contract, pay a differential such as time-and-a-half or double-time to employees who work on some federal holidays. Employees not specifically covered by a union contract might only receive their standard pay for working on a federal holiday, depending on the company policy.

== Legal holidays due to presidential proclamation ==
Federal law also provides for the declaration of other public holidays by the President of the United States. Generally the president will provide a reasoning behind the elevation of the day, and call on the people of the United States to observe the day "with appropriate ceremonies and activities."

Examples of presidentially declared holidays were the days of the funerals for former Presidents Ronald Reagan, Gerald Ford, George H. W. Bush, and Jimmy Carter; when federal government offices are closed and employees given a paid holiday.

In addition, occasionally the President will grant Christmas Eve as a holiday or partial holiday (the latter generally being four hours for full-time employees).

== Proposed federal holidays ==
Many other federal holidays have been proposed. However, as the U.S. federal government is a large employer, these holidays are expensive. If a holiday is controversial, opposition will generally prevent any bill enacting it from passing. For example, Martin Luther King Jr. Day, marking King's birthday, took much effort to pass and for all states to recognize it. It was not until 2000 that this holiday was officially observed in all 50 states.

The following list is an example of holidays that have been proposed. Some of these holidays are observed at the state level.

Date	Official Name	Details
February 15–21 (Third Monday)	Susan B. Anthony Day	The holiday was proposed by Carolyn Maloney in H.R. 655 on February 11, 2011, and was not enacted. It would have fallen on the same day as Washington's Birthday.
March 10 (Fixed date)	Harriet Tubman Day	The holiday was proposed by Representative Brendan Boyle in H.R. 7013 in March 2022.
March 25–31 (last Monday)	Cesar Chavez Day	The holiday was proposed by Representative Joe Baca in H.R. 76 and was further endorsed by President Barack Obama.
May 15–21 (Third Monday)	Malcolm X Day	The holiday was proposed in H.R. 323 in 1993 and 1994 by Congressman Charles Rangel.
June 14 (Fixed date)	Flag Day	Proposed several times, and became a national observance when President Harry S. Truman signed it into law.
September 11 (Fixed date)	September 11 Day of Remembrance	The holiday was proposed by Representative Lee Zeldin in H.R. 5303 and Senator Marsha Blackburn in S. 2735 in September 2021.
September 15–21 (Third Monday)	Native Americans' Day	The holiday was petitioned for and introduced in Congress multiple times but was unsuccessful. A version of it exists today as "Native American Awareness Week".
November 2–8 (First Tuesday after First Monday)	Election Day / Democracy Day	Multiple movements for this holiday to be official have occurred, with the last happening during discussions for the "1993 Motor Voter Act", mainly to boost voter turnout.
December 1 (Fixed date)	Rosa Parks Day	Proposed as part of HR 5111 on September 3, 2021.

== Controversy ==
Some Native American groups protest the observance of the federal holiday of Columbus Day, mainly due to the controversy of Christopher Columbus' arrival to the Americas. Alaska, California, Colorado, Florida, Hawaii, Iowa, Louisiana, Maine, Michigan, Minnesota, New Mexico, North Carolina, Oregon, South Dakota, Vermont, Washington, and Wisconsin do not recognize Columbus Day. Nevada recognizes it, but schools and most businesses remain open because it falls too close to Nevada Day (which is a full holiday). Hawaii and South Dakota mark the day with an alternative holiday or observance. South Dakota is the only state to recognize Native American Day as an official state holiday.

== See also ==
- List of observances in the United States by presidential proclamation
- Public holidays in the United States
- Holidays with paid time off in the United States
- Public holidays in Puerto Rico
- Public holidays in the United States Virgin Islands
- Public holidays in Guam
- Public holidays in American Samoa
- Public holidays in Northern Mariana Islands
- Postal holiday
