= Public holidays in the United States (disambiguation) =

Public holidays in the United States generally refers to holidays that are observed by the citizens of the United States.

Other uses include:

- Federal holidays in the United States refers to holidays observed by government employees
- Holidays with paid time off in the United States
- School holidays in the United States refers to holidays observed by schools in the United States
- Public holidays in the United States Virgin Islands
- Public holidays in Puerto Rico
- Public holidays in Guam

== See also ==
- Category:Public holidays in the United States
- Category:State holidays in the United States
- Government shutdowns in the United States
