= National Girls and Women in Sports Day =

American annual day of observance

- Observed by: United States
- Frequency: Annual (first week of February)
- Related to: Title IX, Women's sport, Women's Sports Foundation

The National Girls and Women in Sports Day (NGWSD) is an annual day of observance held during the first week of February to acknowledge the accomplishments of female athletes, recognize the influence of sports participation for women and girls, and honor the progress and advocation for equality for women in sports.

Each year since its inception in 1987, the United States Congress recognizes women's contributions to sports and society on a day during the first week of February. NGWSD is celebrated annually across the United States and features community-based events, notable women athletes, awards, and other activities. The events are organized by members of the National Girls & Women in Sports Day Coalition, including the Women's Sports Foundation, National Women's Law Center, the President's Council on Fitness, Sports, and Nutrition, and Girls, Inc.

== History ==
"In recognition of the contributions women's sports have made to this country, and of the need to further advance women's sports, the Congress, by Public Law 99-540, has designated February 4, 1987, as "National Women in Sports Day" and authorized and requested the President to issue a proclamation in observance of this event. NOW, THEREFORE, I, RONALD REAGAN, President of the United States do hereby proclaim February 4, 1987, as National Women in Sports Day.

On February 3, 1987, President Ronald Reagan signed Proclamation 5606 declaring February 4, 1987, as National Women in Sports Day.

NGWSD was initiated in 1987 as a day to remember Olympic volleyball player Flo Hyman for her achievements and work for equality. Hyman died suddenly of Marfan Syndrome, a genetic disorder of the connective tissue, in 1986 while competing in a volleyball tournament in Japan. In 1989, the name was amended to National Women and Girls in Sports Day. Since then, the day of observance has evolved to recognize all women athletes, their past and current sports achievements, the positive influence of sports participation for women, girls and society, as well as the progress made since Title IX was passed and the continuing struggle for equality and access for women in sports.

== See also ==
- Title IX
- Women's Sports Foundation
- Women's sport

=== Other holidays honoring women ===
- Susan B. Anthony Day (February 15)
- Rosa Parks Day (February 4 / December 1)
- International Women's Day, (March 8)
- Harriet Tubman Day (March 10)
- World Female Ranger Day (June 23)
- Helen Keller Day (June 27)
- Women's Equality Day (August 26)
