= List of African-American holidays =

African-Americans make up 12% of the American population and there are several holidays that celebrate them.

== Federal holidays ==
The following are African-American federal holidays in the United States:

Date	Name	First celebrated	Remarks
third Monday of January	Martin Luther King Jr. Day	1986	The birthday of Martin Luther King Jr.
June 19	Juneteenth National Independence Day	2021	Commemorates General Order No. 3, the legal decree issued in 1865 by Union General Gordon Granger enforcing the Emancipation Proclamation to the residents of Galveston, Texas, at the end of the American Civil War.

== State holidays ==
The following are African-American holidays celebrated in at least one US State or territory:

Date	Name	Number of States/territories celebrating	First celebrated	States Celebrating	Remarks
February 4 or December 1	Rosa Parks Day	8	1998	Alabama (2018), California (2000), Michigan (1998), Missouri (2015), Ohio (2011), Oregon (2014), Tennessee (2019), Texas (2021)	The birthday or arrest of Rosa Parks
March 22 or April 16 or May 20 or July 3 or November 1	Emancipation Day	5	2005	Florida (2021), Maryland (2013), Puerto Rico, Washington, DC (2005), United States Virgin Islands (2017)	Commemorates the Emancipation of slaves
March 10	Harriet Tubman Day	1	2000	Maryland (2000)	The death of Harriet Tubman
May 19	Malcolm X Day	1	2015	Illinois (2015)	The birthday of Malcolm X
August 4	Barack Obama Day	1	2017	Illinois (2017)	The birthday of Barack Obama
February 4	Transit Equality Day	1	2022	Wisconsin (2022)	The birthday of Rosa Parks
February 1	George Washington Carver Day	1	2023	Iowa (2023)	

== Municipal holidays ==
The following African-American holidays are celebrated by different municipalities:

Date	Name	Number of Municipalities curating	First celebrated	Municipalities Celebrating	Remarks
March 3	Liberation and Freedom Day	1	2019	Charlottesville, Virginia (2019)	Emancipation of slaves in Charlottesville
September 24	Kunta Kinte Heritage Festival	1	1987	Annapolis, Maryland (1987)	The arrival of Kunta Kinte

== Other ==
The following are non-government African American holidays:

Date	Name	Organization	First celebrated	Remarks
April 15	Jackie Robinson Day	Major League Baseball	2004	Opening day for Jackie Robinson's first season
June	Odunde Festival	Philadelphia community	1975	Celebration of the Yoruba people
February	Black History Month	Black Students Union	1970	February in the United States and Canada, October in the United Kingdom and Ireland
June	African-American Music Appreciation Month		1979	
December 26 to January 1	Kwanzaa		1966	
