= Women's Equality Day =

American celebration

Women’s Equality Day
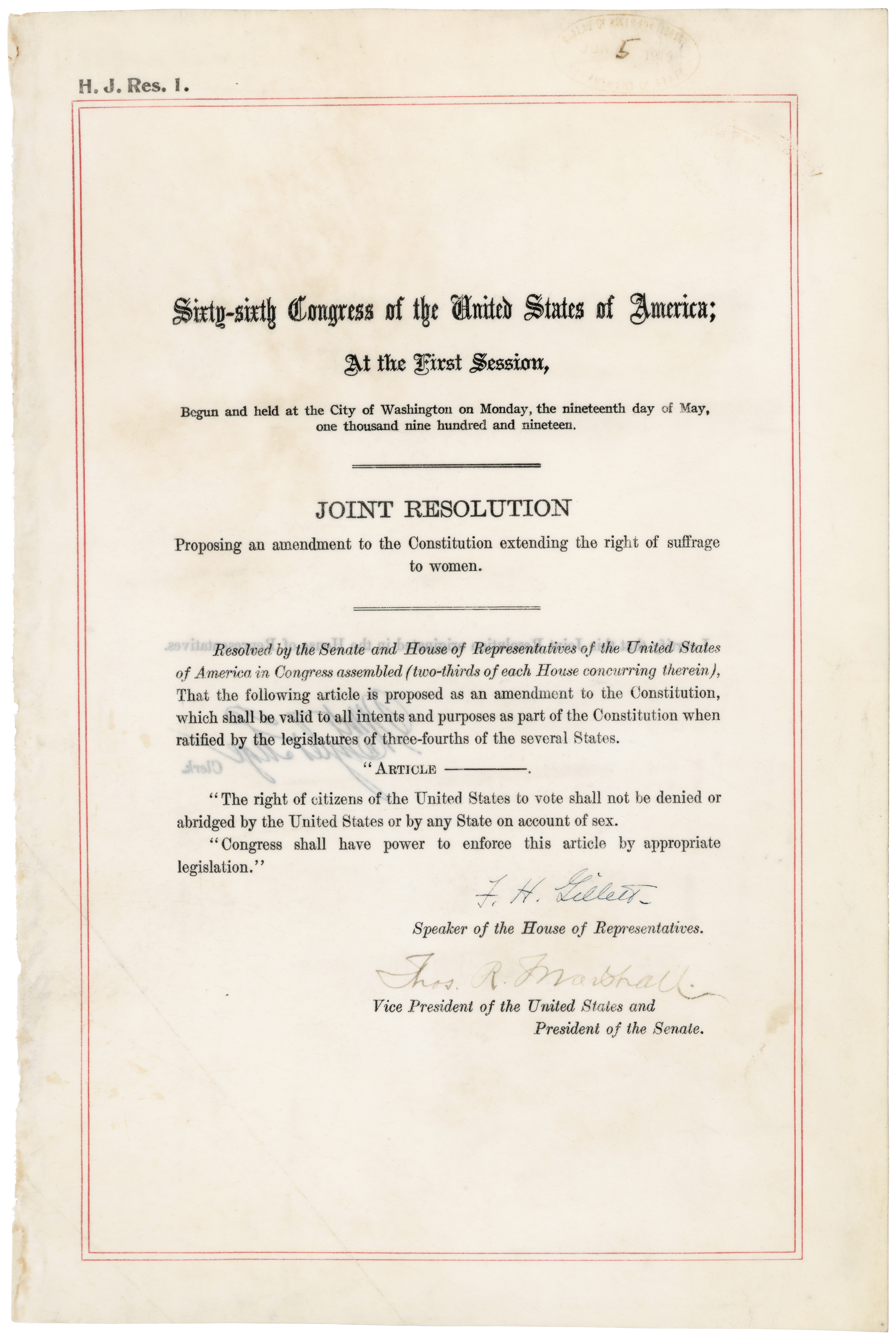
- Page 1 of House Bill
- Observed by: United States
- Type: Historical
- Significance: Anniversary of 19th Amendment giving women the right to vote
- Date: August 26
- Frequency: annual

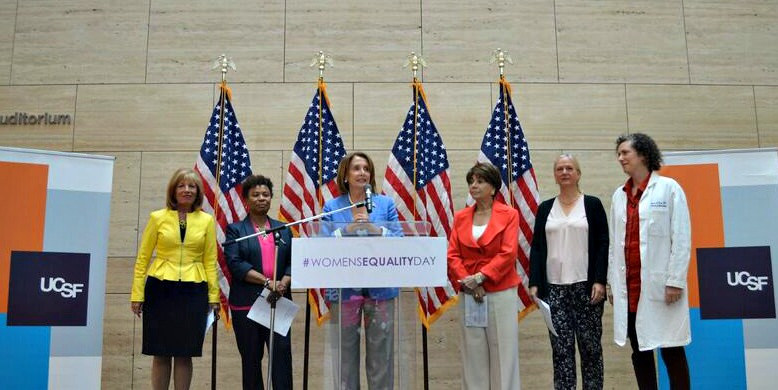
Nancy Pelosi, Anna Eshoo, Barbara Lee and Jackie Speier on the 96th anniversary of the 19th Amendment to the Constitution, when women won the right to vote.

Women's Equality Day is celebrated in the United States on August 26 to commemorate the 1920 adoption of the Nineteenth Amendment (Amendment XIX) to the United States Constitution, which prohibits the states and the federal government from denying the right to vote to citizens of the United States on the basis of sex. It was first celebrated in 1971, designated by Congress in 1973, and is proclaimed each year by the United States President.

== History ==
The date was chosen to commemorate the day in 1920 when the Secretary of State Bainbridge Colby signed the proclamation granting American women the constitutional right to vote.

=== 1970s ===
In 1971, following the 1970 nationwide Women's Strike for Equality, and again in 1973, as the battles over the Equal Rights Amendment continued, Congresswoman Bella Abzug of New York introduced a resolution to designate August 26 as Women's Equality Day.

In 1972, President Richard Nixon issued Proclamation 4147, which designated August 26, 1972, as "Women's Rights Day" and was the first official proclamation of Women's Equality Day. On August 16, 1973, Congress approved H.J. Res. 52, which stated that August 26 would be designated as Women's Equality Day and that "the President is authorized and requested to issue a proclamation in commemoration of that day in 1920 on which the women in America were first guaranteed the right to vote". The same day, President Nixon issued Proclamation 4236 for Women's Equality Day, which began, in part: "The struggle for women's suffrage, however, was only the first step toward full and equal participation of women in our Nation's life. In recent years, we have made other giant strides by attacking sex discrimination through our laws and by paving new avenues to equal economic opportunity for women. Today, in virtually every sector of our society, women are making important contributions to the quality of American life. And yet, much still remains to be done".

=== 1980s ===
In 1981, 21 women wore white and chained themselves to the White House to call for the ratification of the Equal Rights Amendment.

=== 21st century ===
As of 2024, every president since Richard Nixon has issued a proclamation each year designating August 26 as Women's Equality Day.

Go Topless Day, an annual event started in 2007, is scheduled for the Sunday nearest Women's Equality Day, because of "Sylvie Chabot's remark that August 26 is Women's Equality Day in the US because it is on August 26, 1920 that women won their constitutional right to vote." The event encourages women to go topless in public, and men to cover their chests by wearing bras or bikinis.

== See also ==
- Gender equality
- Gender inequality
- Timeline of women's suffrage
- Women's History Month
- List of observances in the United States by presidential proclamation

Other holidays honoring women

- Rosa Parks Day (February 4/December 1)
- National Girls and Women in Sports Day (one day first week of February)
- Susan B. Anthony Day (February 15)
- International Women's Day, (March 8)
- Harriet Tubman Day (March 10)
- Mother's Day (second Sunday in May)
- Helen Keller Day (June 27)
