= Postal holiday =

US federal holiday on which no regular mail is delivered

In the United States, a postal holiday is a federal holiday recognized by the United States Postal Service, during which no regular mail is delivered. However, Priority Mail Express items are still delivered, as that service functions year round.

Though letter carriers have the day off, some postal workers are required to work on holidays, such as clerks dispatching mail, or those working in plant distribution facilities. Some plant facilities operate 365 days a year.

Part 608, section 3.2 of the DMM (U.S. Domestic Mail Manual) groups holidays into "Widely Observed" and "Not Widely Observed". Holidays "Widely Observed" include New Year’s Day, Memorial Day, Independence Day, Labor Day, Martin Luther King Jr. Day, Thanksgiving Day, and Christmas Day. Holidays "Not Widely Observed" are Washington's Birthday, Columbus Day, and Veterans Day.

If a holiday occurs on Sunday, the holiday will be observed on Monday.

== List of holidays ==
The eleven postal holidays are:

| Date | Official name | Remarks |
|---|---|---|
| January 1 | New Year's Day | Celebrates beginning of the Gregorian calendar year. Festivities include countdowns to midnight. |
| Third Monday in January | Martin Luther King Jr. Day | Honors birthday (January 15, 1929) of Martin Luther King Jr., civil rights leader; combined with other holidays in several states |
| Third Monday in February | Washington's Birthday | Honors George Washington, born February 22. Often popularly observed as "Presidents Day" in recognition of other American presidents. |
| Last Monday in May | Memorial Day | Honors the American soldiers who have died in military service; unofficially marks the beginning of summer. (traditionally May 30) |
| June 19 | Juneteenth National Independence Day | Commemorates the end of slavery. (Postal holiday starting in 2022) |
| July 4 | Independence Day | Celebrates Declaration of Independence, usually called the Fourth of July. |
| First Monday in September | Labor Day | Celebrate achievements of workers and the labor movement; unofficially marks the end of summer and the return to school for students in most parts of the United States. |
| Second Monday in October | Columbus Day | Honors Christopher Columbus, traditional discoverer of the Americas. |
| November 11 | Veterans Day | Honors all veterans of the United States armed forces. |
| Fourth Thursday in November | Thanksgiving Day | Traditionally celebrates giving thanks for the autumn harvest, and customarily includes the consumption of a turkey dinner. |
| December 25 | Christmas Day | Celebrates the Nativity of Jesus which is traditionally observed on December 25. Secular aspects of this holiday include giving gifts and decorating a Christmas tree. |

This list is identical to the list of federal holidays in the United States. If a postal holiday falls on a Sunday, it is observed on the following Monday.

Canada Post also maintains a list of Postal Holidays.

== See also ==
- Federal holidays
- Holidays of the United States
- List of observances in the United States by presidential proclamation
