= Virgin Islands–Puerto Rico Friendship Day =

Public holiday in the U.S. Virgin Islands

Virgin Islands-Puerto Rico Friendship Day
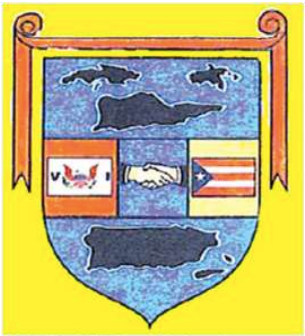
- VI-PR Friendship Seal 2006
- Also called: Puerto Rico Friendship Day, VI-PR Friendship Day
- Observed by: United States Virgin Islands
- Date: Second Monday in October
- 2025 date: October 13
- 2026 date: October 12
- 2027 date: October 11
- 2028 date: October 9
- Frequency: annual
- Related to: Columbus Day

Virgin Islands-Puerto Rico Friendship Day is a public holiday celebrated in the U.S. Virgin Islands on the second Monday in October.

Established in 1964 by Governor Paiewonsky, it honors Puerto Ricans who reside in or who have made substantial contributions to the Virgin Islands. The date was chosen to coincide with Columbus Day, as "an appropriate day for commemorating the solidarity of Americans in the Caribbean".

== Puerto Ricans in the U.S. Virgin Islands ==
The Puerto Rican mainland is about 40 miles (64 km) from the U.S. Virgin Islands (with the Puerto Rican islands of Culebra and Vieques lying in between), and many Puerto Ricans have lived in the Virgin Islands since at least the turn of the 20th century. As of 2010, about 10% of the population of the U.S. Virgin Islands (18% of Saint Croix, 3% of Saint Thomas) is Puerto Rican.

=== Puerto Ricans in the U.S. Virgin Islands ===
- Juan Francisco Luis, third elected governor of the U.S. Virgin Islands
- Arturo Alfonso Schomburg, a historian who attended high school on Saint Thomas.

== Celebrations ==
Celebrations take place throughout the first half of October, including a sunset jazz concert, a family-fun day, dance and craft workshops, cock-fighting demonstrations, a fine step horse presentation, and a cultural exchange event. Other events include a 5K race, sports tournaments, school presentations, a coronation, a parade, and a cultural village with food, arts and crafts, and bands.

== See also ==
- Public holidays in the United States Virgin Islands
