= Public holidays in the United States =

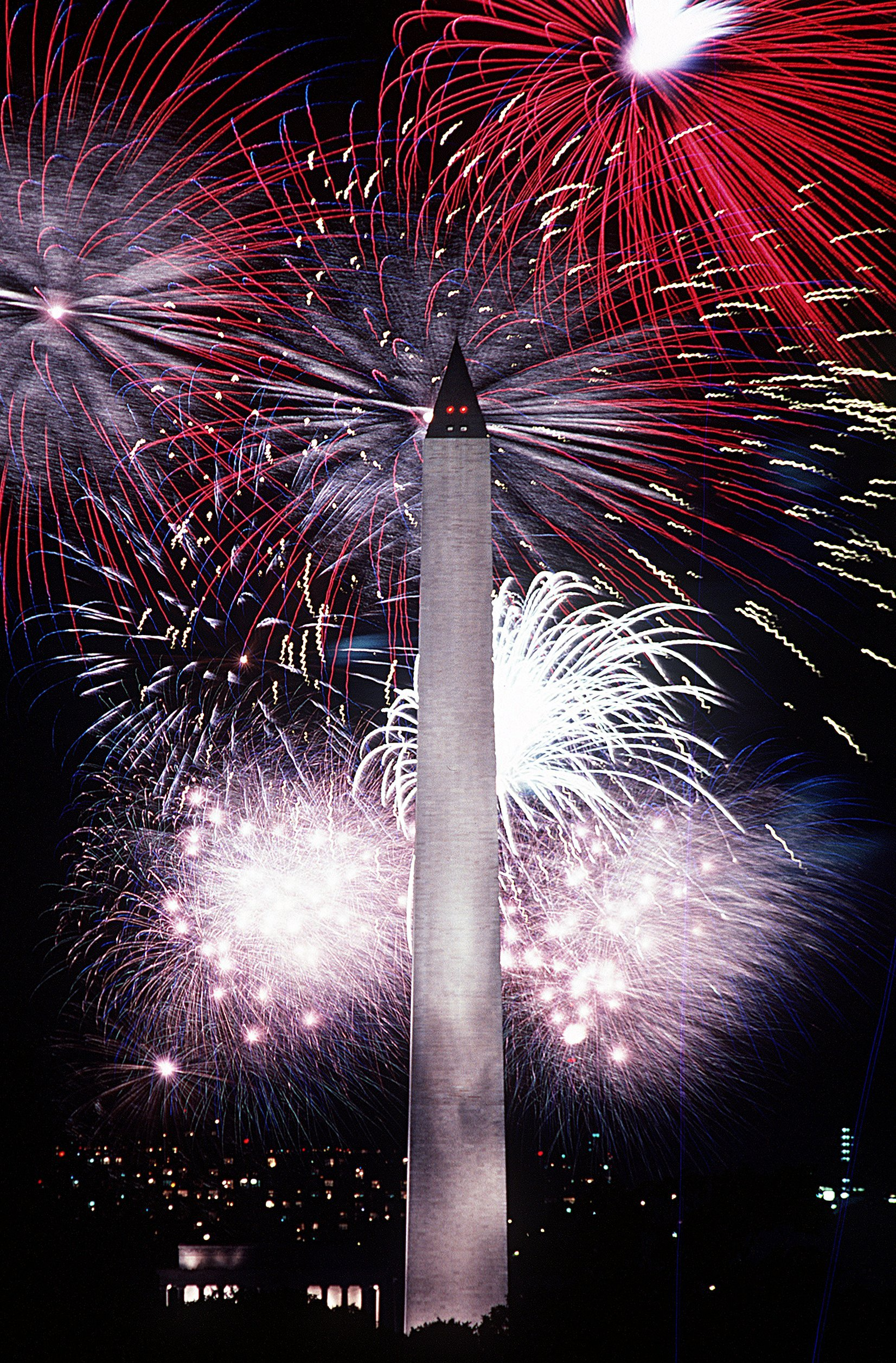
- Public • Paid • Federal • Observance • School • Hallmark
- Observed by: Federal government State governments Local governments Private and public sector employers
- Type: National

In the United States, public holidays are set by federal, state, and local governments and are often observed by closing government offices or giving government employees paid time off. The federal government does not require private businesses to close or offer paid time off, as is the case for most state and local governments, so employers determine which holidays to observe.

Several federal holidays are widely observed by private businesses with paid time off. These include New Year's Day, Memorial Day, Independence Day, Labor Day, Thanksgiving, and Christmas. Businesses often close or grant paid time off for New Year's Eve, Christmas Eve, and the Day after Thanksgiving, but none of these are federal holidays. Other federal holidays are less widely observed by businesses. Most federal holidays are celebrated on a Monday or Friday to create a three-day weekend.

Christmas is the only religious holiday that is a federal holiday. Some businesses allow religious employees to take paid time off for religious observances.

Other holidays, such as Halloween and Valentine's Day, are widely celebrated in the United States but rarely include paid time off.

== Overview ==
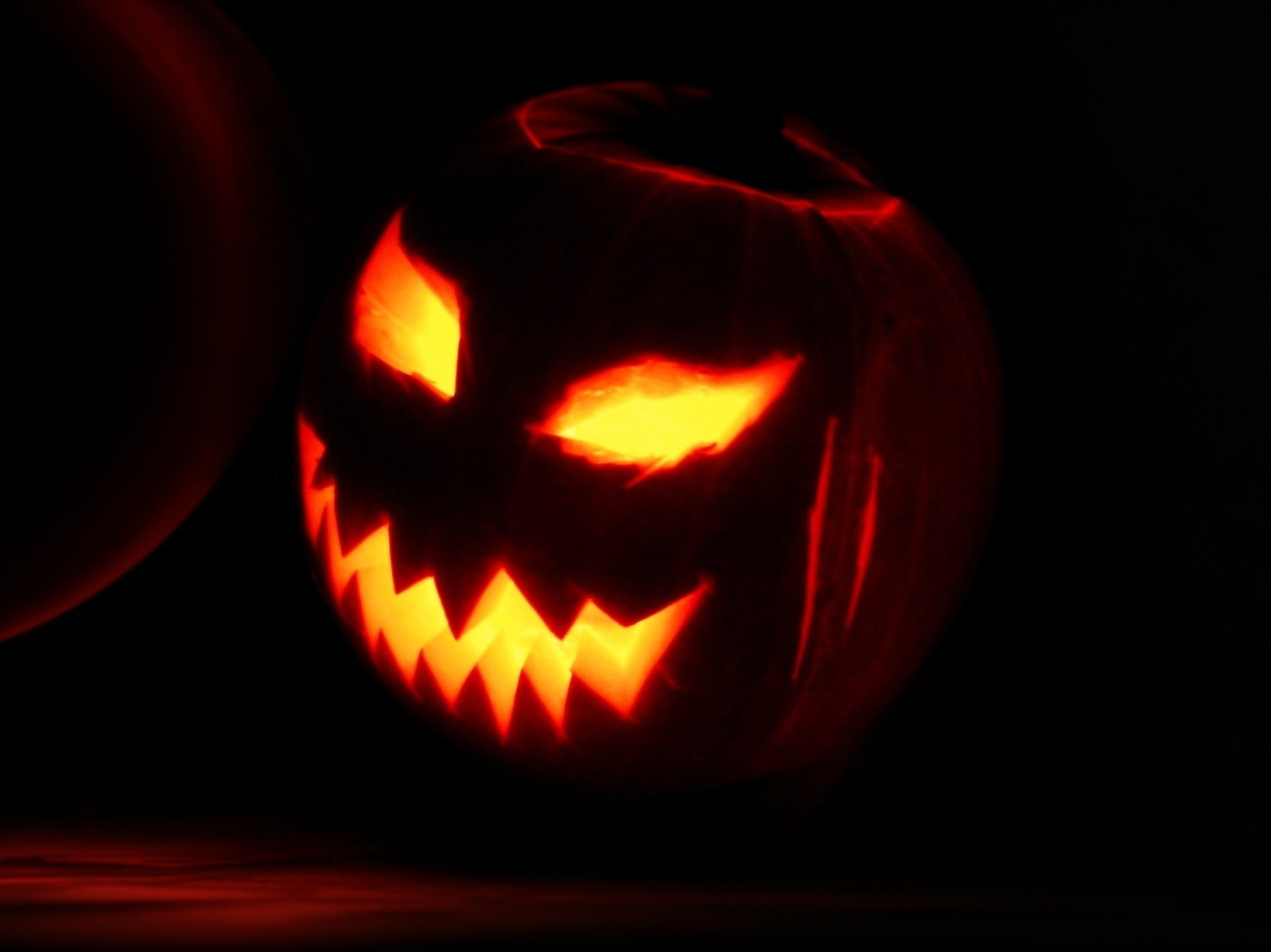
A jack-o'-lantern, one of the symbols of Halloween

There are no national holidays on which the law requires all businesses to close. Federal holidays are only established for certain federally chartered and regulated businesses, government contractors, and the city of Washington, DC. All other public holidays are created by the States. Most states allow local jurisdictions, cities, villages, etc., to establish local holidays. As a result, holidays have not historically been governed at the federal level, and federal law does not govern business openings.

Many states have additional holidays that the federal government does not observe. Most prominent among these are holidays to celebrate statehood. Since 2000, some city and state-level celebrations of Malcolm X Day and Rosa Parks Day have been created, in addition to the federal Martin Luther King Jr. Day, to honor and recognize African American contributions to the United States. Missouri honors Rosa Parks on her birthday.

Colorado became the first state to establish a paid state holiday honoring a woman in 2020 with the designation of the first Monday in October as Frances Xavier Cabrini Day.

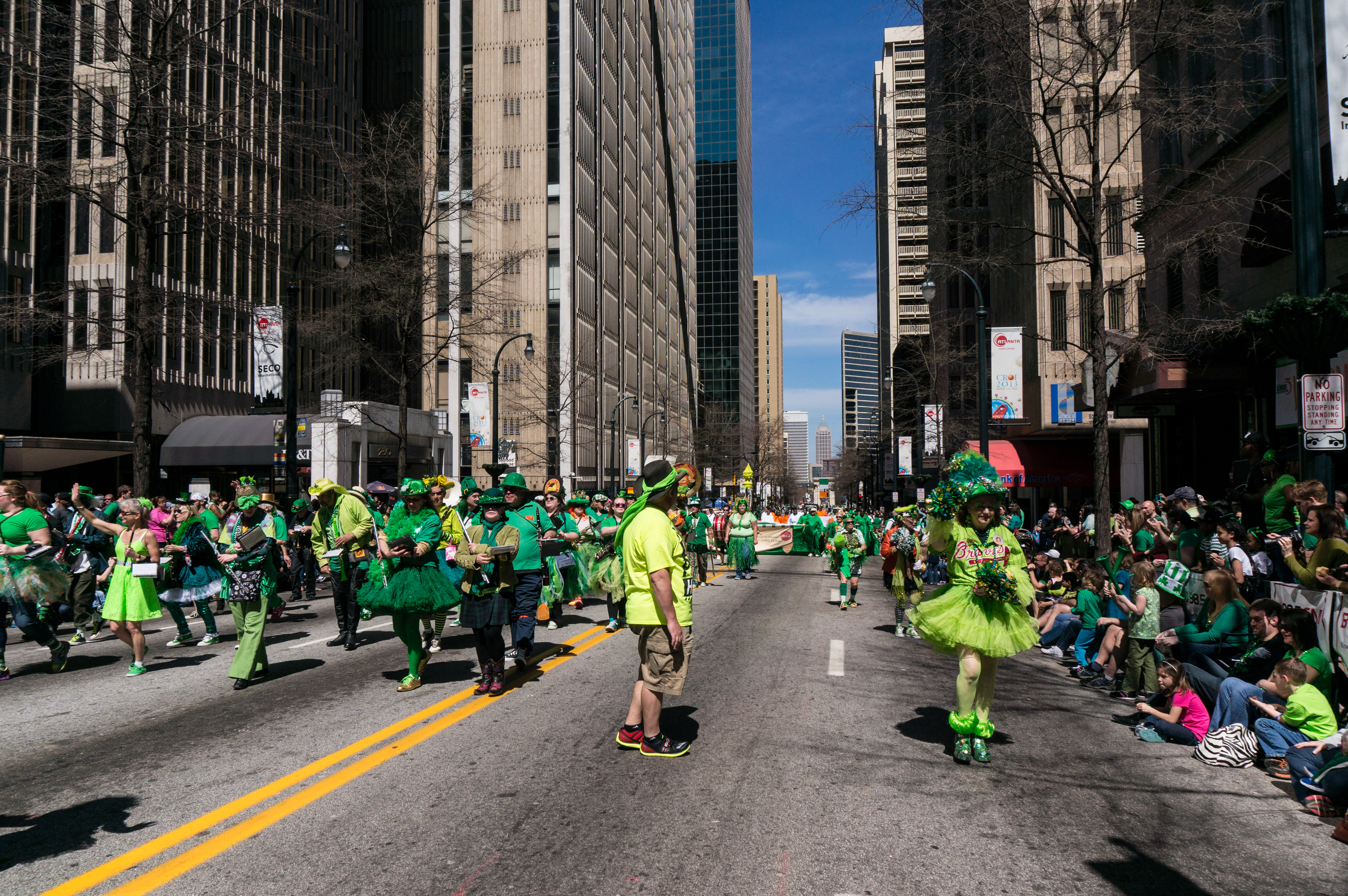
Saint Patrick's Day parade in Atlanta, 2012

Many businesses observe certain holidays, which are also not mandated by any government agency. Many workplaces celebrate religious observance as well as ethnic holidays, such as Saint Patrick's Day, Kwanzaa, Diwali, Mardi Gras, and Cinco de Mayo, as a matter of best practice.

While the popularity of each public holiday cannot easily be measured, the holiday with the highest greeting card sales is Christmas. Major retail establishments, such as shopping malls and centers, close only on Thanksgiving and Christmas, but remain open on all other holidays, with early closings on Christmas Eve and New Year's Eve, and sometimes on other major holidays. In the face of a rapidly tightening retail market in the 2010s, retailers have increasingly been opening on Thanksgiving evening and night to extend Black Friday and the holiday shopping season, however, the COVID-19 pandemic greatly limited this practice.

Virtually all large companies observe and close on the major holidays (New Year's Day, Memorial Day, Independence Day, Labor Day, Thanksgiving, and Christmas). Some non-retail businesses close the day after Thanksgiving, while others, such as federal banks and post offices, are not allowed to close that day. Some smaller businesses normally open on Sundays will close on Easter Sunday if they expect to have very few customers that day.

=== Holiday business restrictions ===
Some states restrict certain business activities on some holidays. Business closures are mandated on a few holidays in some states for certain kinds of businesses by blue laws. For example, businesses that operate on more than 5,000 square feet (460 m^{2}) cannot open on Thanksgiving in some New England states. The most notable businesses to close on such occasions are car dealerships and liquor stores. Some holidays are observed with community service, depending on the meaning of the holiday. Service is not mandated by any government agencies, whether they be federal, state, or local.

== Federal holidays ==
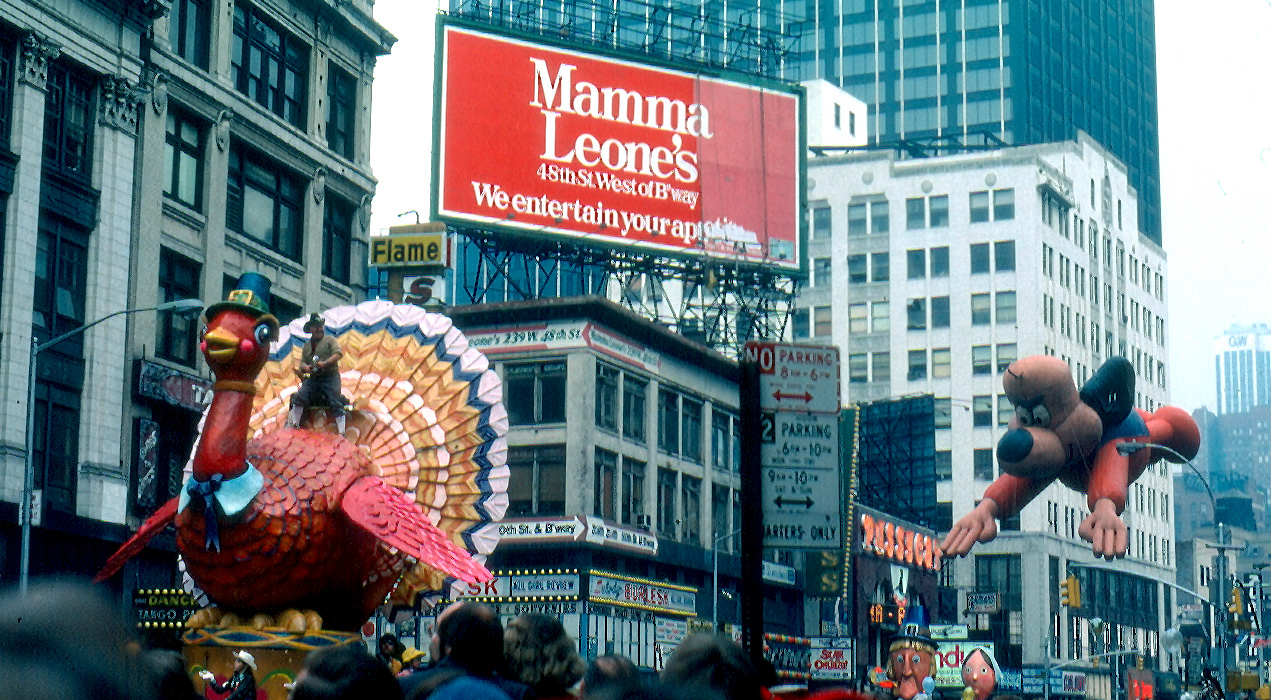
The 1979 Macy's Thanksgiving Day Parade

The following federal holidays are observed by the majority of private businesses with paid time off:

- New Year's Day (January 1)
- Memorial Day (last Monday in May; May 25 in 2026)
- Independence Day (July 4)
- Labor Day (first Monday in September; September 7 in 2026)
- Thanksgiving Day (fourth Thursday in November; November 26 in 2026)
- Christmas Day (December 25)

Other federal holidays are less widely observed by businesses. These include:

- Birthday of Martin Luther King, Jr. (third Monday in January; January 19 in 2026)
- Washington's Birthday (third Monday in February; February 16 in 2026)
- Juneteenth (June 19)
- Columbus Day (second Monday in October; October 12 in 2026)
- Veterans Day (November 11)

Established in 2021, Juneteenth is the newest federal holiday. In its second year of federal observance, 30% of private employers offered paid time off.

== Holidays with religious significance ==
Religious and cultural holidays in the United States are characterized by a diversity of religious beliefs and practices. However, the First Amendment to the United States Constitution provides that "Congress shall make no law respecting an establishment of religion, or prohibiting the free exercise thereof ...." and Article VI specifies that "no religious Test shall ever be required as a Qualification to any Office or public Trust under the United States." As a result, various religious faiths have flourished, as well as perished, in the United States. In 2002, a majority of Americans reported that religion plays a "very important" role in their lives, a proportion unique among developed nations.

In 2012, the majority of Americans (73–80%) identified themselves as Christians and about 15–20% had no religious affiliation. In the 2008 American Religious Identification Survey (ARIS), 76% of American adults population identified themselves as Christians, with 51% professing attendance at a variety of churches that could be considered Protestant or unaffiliated, and 25% professing Catholic beliefs. The same survey said that other religions (including, for example, Islam, Judaism, Buddhism, and Hinduism) collectively made up about 4% of the adult population, another 15% of the adult population claimed no religious affiliation, and 5.2% said they did not know, or they refused to reply. In a 2012 survey by the Pew forum, 36 percent of Americans stated that they attended services nearly every week or more.

=== Christian holidays ===
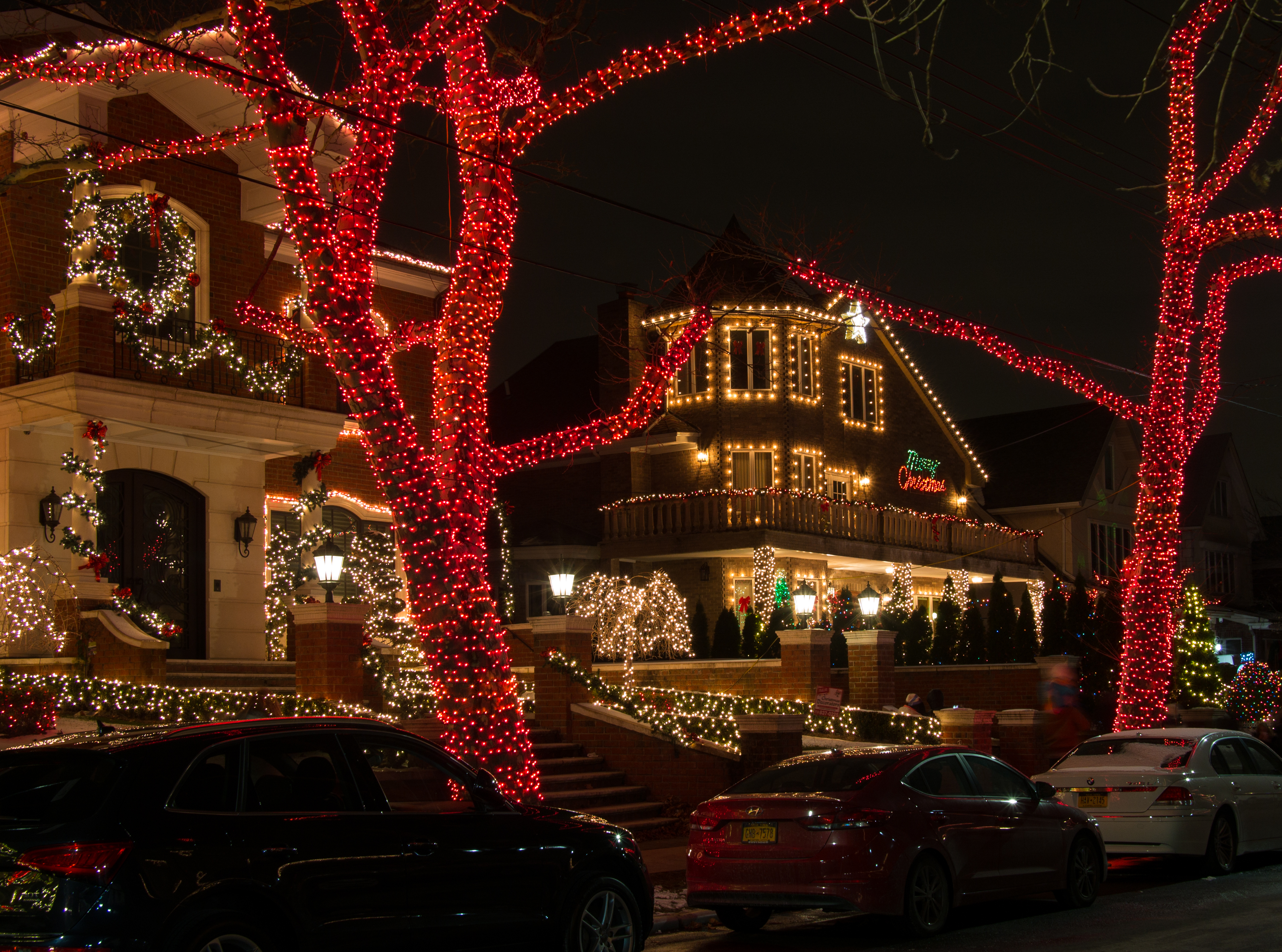
Houses decorated with Christmas lights in the Dyker Heights neighborhood of Brooklyn, New York

With 65% of adults in the U.S. identifying as Christian in 2019, many holidays from the liturgical calendar are observed by this segment of the population. Many businesses, as well as federal, state, and local governments, are closed on Christmas. A reference in the film A Christmas Story shows a Chinese restaurant being the only establishment open on Christmas.

Some private businesses and certain other institutions are closed on Good Friday (April 18 2025, April 3 2026, March 26 2027, April 14 2028). The financial market and stock market is closed on Good Friday. Most retail stores remain open, although some might close early. Public schools and most universities are closed on Good Friday, either as a holiday of its own, or part of spring break. The postal service operates, and banks regulated by the federal government do not close for Good Friday.

Many companies, including banks, malls, shopping centers, and most private retail stores that normally open on Sundays are closed on Easter (April 20 2025, April 5 2026, March 28 2027, April 16 2028).

=== Jewish holidays ===
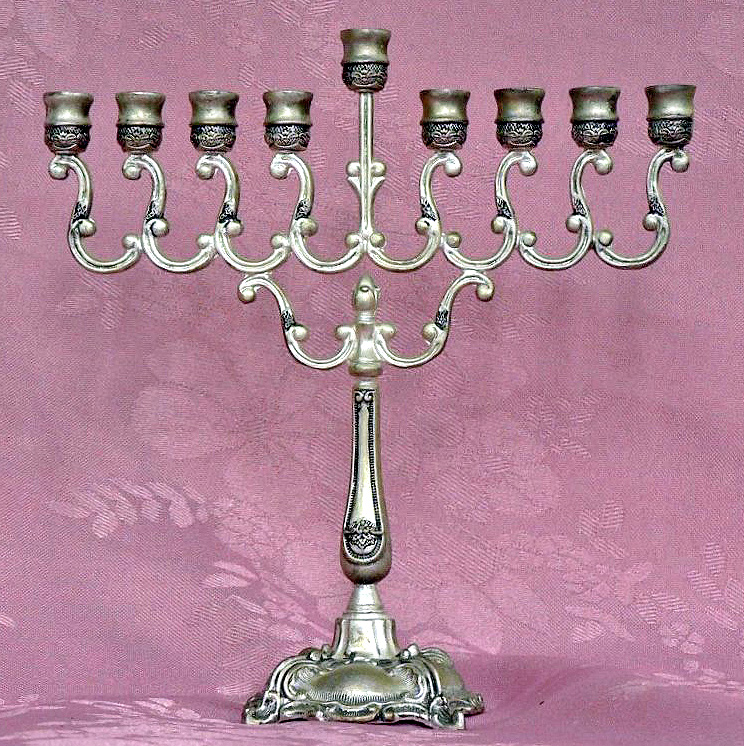
A Hanukkah menorah

The three most commonly celebrated Jewish holidays are Passover (Sunset, April 1, 2026 – nightfall, April 9, 2026), Rosh Hashanah (Sunset, September 11, 2026 – nightfall, September 13, 2026), and Yom Kippur (Sunset, September 20, 2026 – nightfall, September 21, 2026). Passover, Yom Kippur, Rosh Hashanah, and Hanukkah (Sunset, December 4, 2026 – nightfall, December 12, 2026) are recognized as an optional state level holiday in Texas. All Jewish holidays start the night before, as that is when the Jewish day begins.

=== Islamic holidays ===
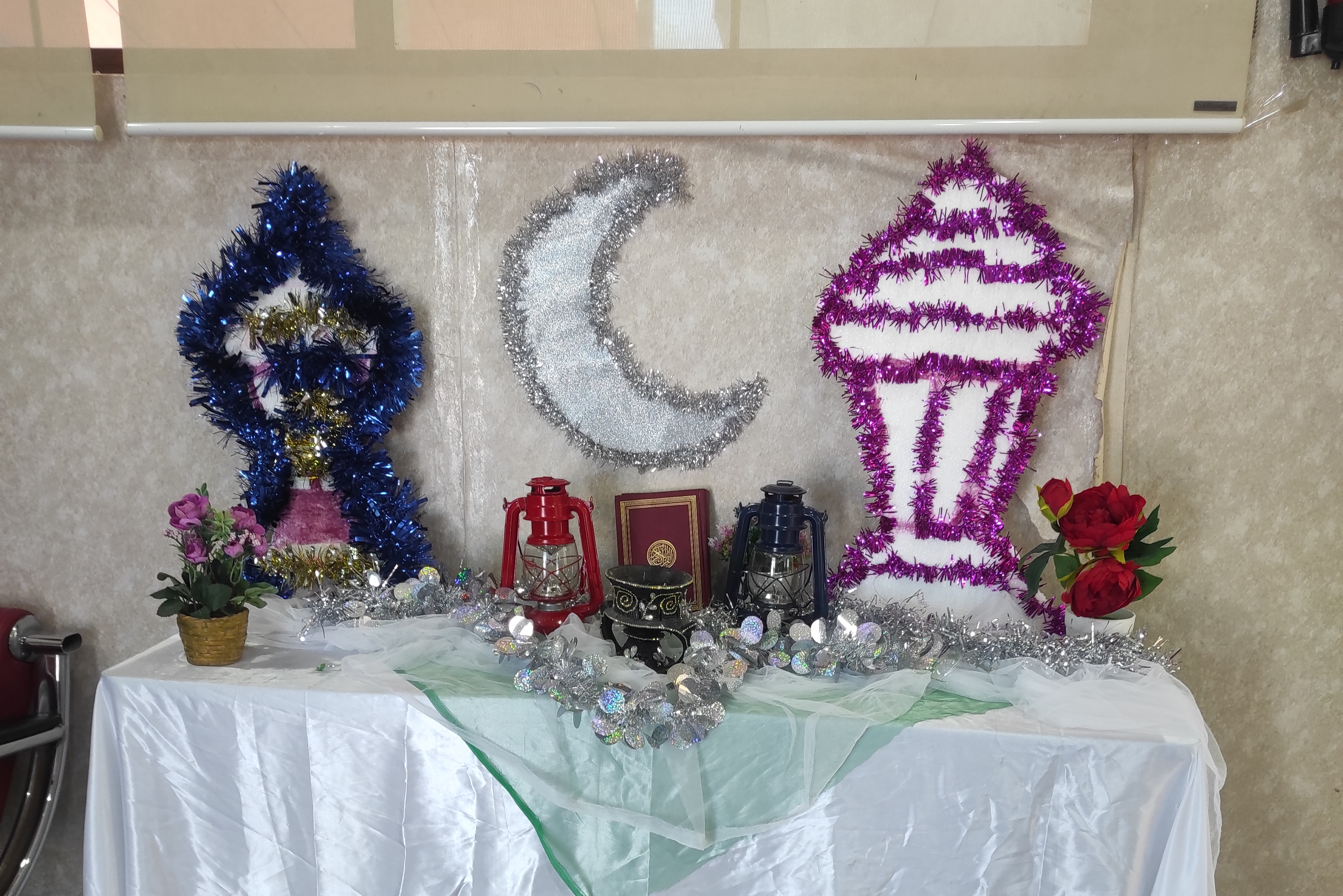
The Crescent decorations, with fanous and bakhoor, are popular during Ramadan.

The major Islamic holidays of Ramadan, Eid al-Fitr, and Eid al-Adha have been recognized in the United States. Awareness of these holidays can be found in calendars published by major calendar manufacturers. Dearborn, Michigan was the first city in the United States to make Eid al-Fitr, and Eid al-Adha paid holidays, and public schools close for both. New York City Public Schools have closed for Eid al-Fitr and Eid al-Adha since 2015. In recent years, dozens of New Jersey school districts have closed for one or both holidays.

=== Hindu holidays ===
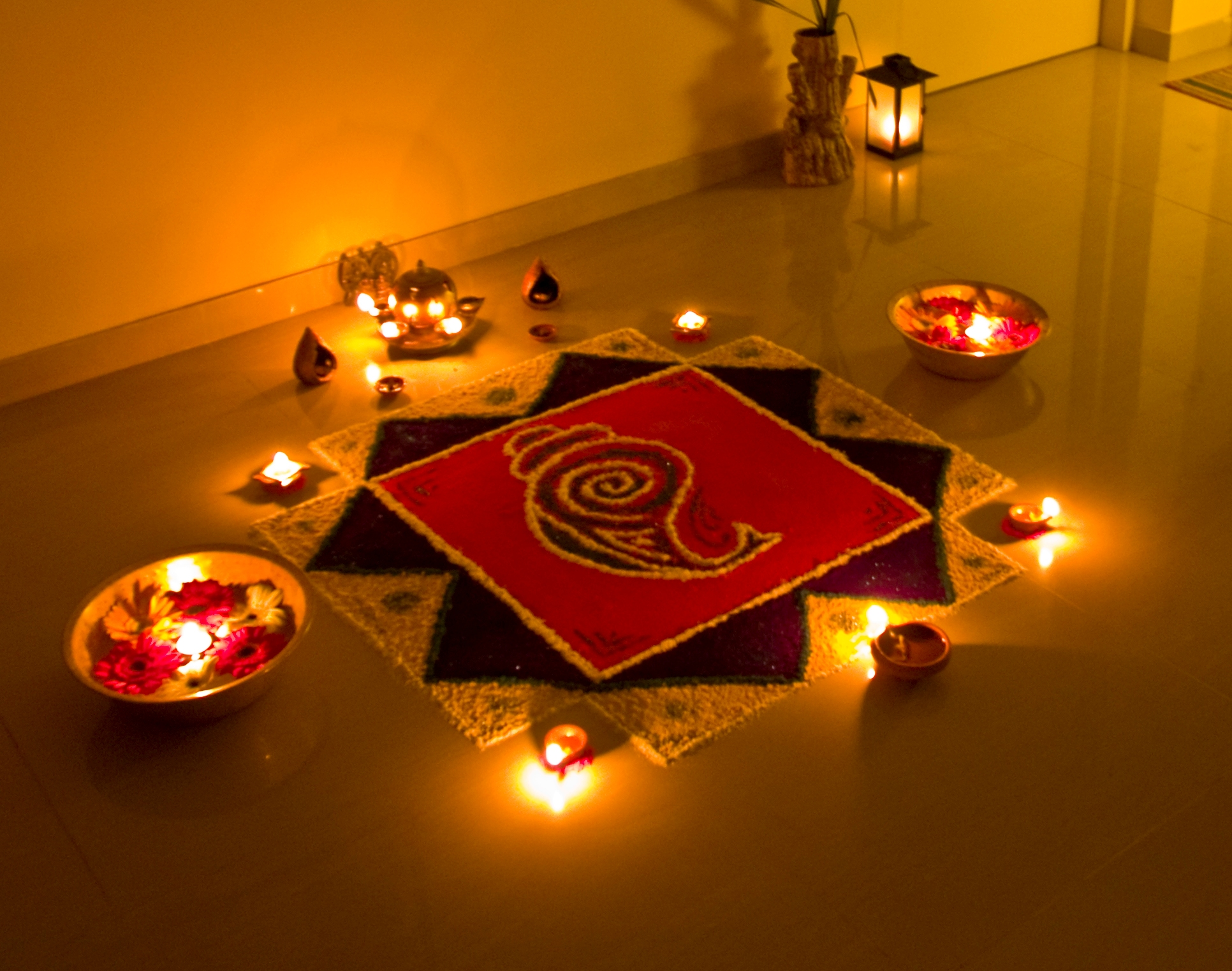
Rangoli decorations, made using colored powder, are popular during Diwali.

The Hindu holidays of Diwali and Holi are celebrated in some parts of the United States, mostly by Indian Americans or peoples of Indian descent. Holi, the "festival of colors" has inspired a Broadway musical based on this festival. While not officially recognized in most of the United States, the New York City Council officially recognized these as official school holidays in New York City. CNN reported that the Diwali holiday is shown in American pop culture through an episode of The Office.

== Holidays with other cultural or historical significance ==
=== Drinking holidays ===
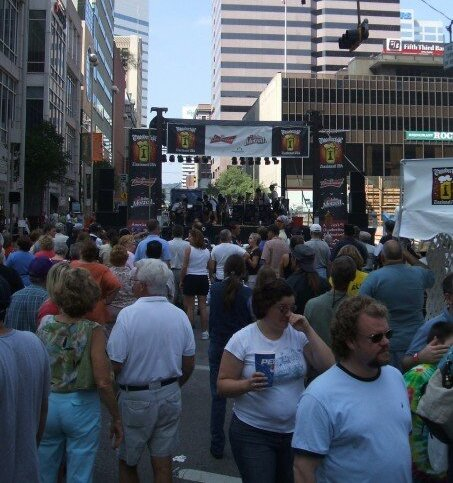
Crowds on Vine Street at the Oktoberfest in Cincinnati

According to the National Institutes of Health, about 86% of the population over 18 drinks alcohol recreationally or socially. In the United States, the holidays that are considered the most "festive" are generally regarded as some of the "most drunken holidays". Celebrations usually revolve around barbecues and beer. Although many of these holidays lack any official status, they are generally observed by the drinking culture for the fact that these holidays revolve around drinking.

One measurement of the popularity of these holidays is the amount of alcohol purchased for the occasion. One survey names New Year's Eve as the holiday on which the most alcohol is consumed based on sales. While many holidays are listed, some are generally notable for their drinking requirement while others are known for abstinence.

=== African American holidays ===
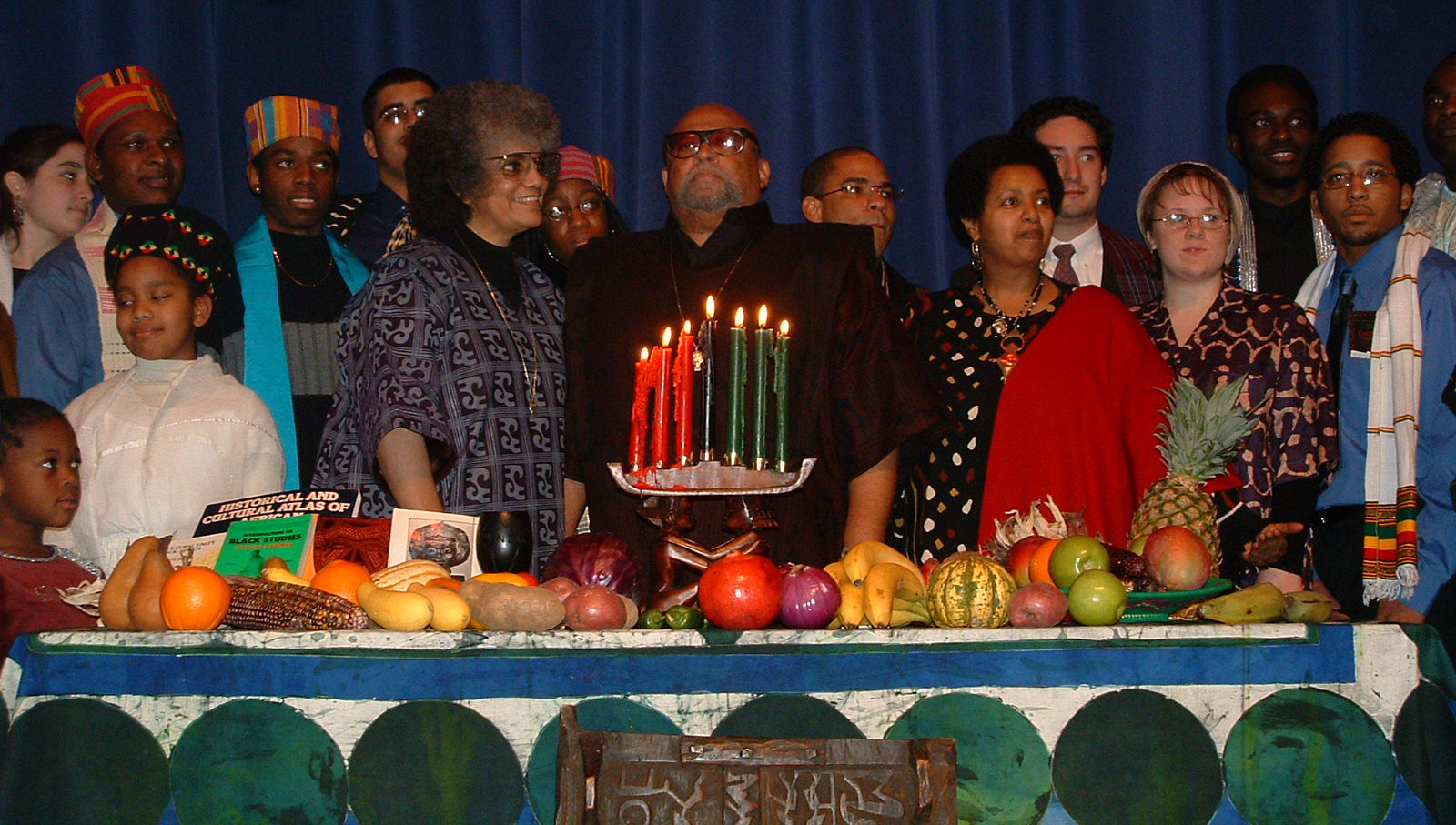
2003 Kwanzaa celebration with its founder, Maulana Karenga, and others

Some holidays in the United States celebrate or recognize the struggle of African-Americans for emancipation from slavery and civil rights. Two holidays are celebrated as Federal holidays:

- Martin Luther King Jr. Day, observed on the Monday falling on or between January 15–21, commemorates the birthday of Dr. King, a significant leader of the Civil Rights Movement. The holiday was established federally in 1983 and first officially celebrated in 1986; efforts to create the holiday faced strong opposition and some southern states paired the new holiday with a holiday honoring the Confederacy
- Juneteenth, observed on June 19, commemorates the announcement of the abolition of slavery in Texas in June 1865, and more generally the emancipation of enslaved African-Americans. The name is a portmanteau of June and nineteenth and has been a federal holiday since 2021.

Some states and cities have additional holidays honoring African-Americans:

- Emancipation Day, observed in Florida, Georgia, Kentucky, Maryland, Mississippi, Tennessee, Texas, Virginia, Washington, D.C., Puerto Rico, and the US Virgin Islands on various days based on when enslaved people were emancipated in those jurisdictions
- Harriet Tubman Day, observed in New York and in some parts of Maryland on March 10
- Malcolm X Day, observed in Illinois and Berkeley, California, on May 19; also celebrated in cities such as Atlanta, Philadelphia, and Washington, D.C. as an unofficial holiday
- Rosa Parks Day, observed in Missouri on February 4, in California and Michigan on the following Monday, and in Ohio on December 1

A significant African-American cultural celebration is Kwanzaa, observed from December 26 to January 1. Created by Maulana Karenga in 1966, the holiday honors African heritage in African-American culture.

=== Confederate holidays ===
Some states celebrate holidays honoring the Confederate States of America that seceded from the United States. Many of these state holidays were created in the early twentieth century, fifty years after the end of the Civil War, as part of the myth of the Lost Cause of the Confederacy.

- Confederate Memorial (or Heroes) Day is observed in Alabama, Florida, Kentucky, Mississippi, South Carolina, Louisiana and Texas on various days.
- Robert E. Lee Day (on or around Lee's Jan 19 birthday) is still observed in Alabama and Mississippi combined with Martin Luther King Jr. Day, the only remaining states to do so. It is officially recognized in Florida, but is not widely observed there. Arkansas combined the observance of Robert E. Lee Day with Martin Luther King Jr. Day in 1985. In 2017, the state passed a law removing Lee's name from the January holiday and instead establishing a state memorial day on the second Saturday of October in honor of Lee.
- Confederate History Month has been declared at least once in Alabama, Florida, Georgia, Louisiana, Mississippi, Texas, and Virginia as well as by various cities, usually in April to augment Confederate Memorial Day.

=== Other traditional and informal holidays ===
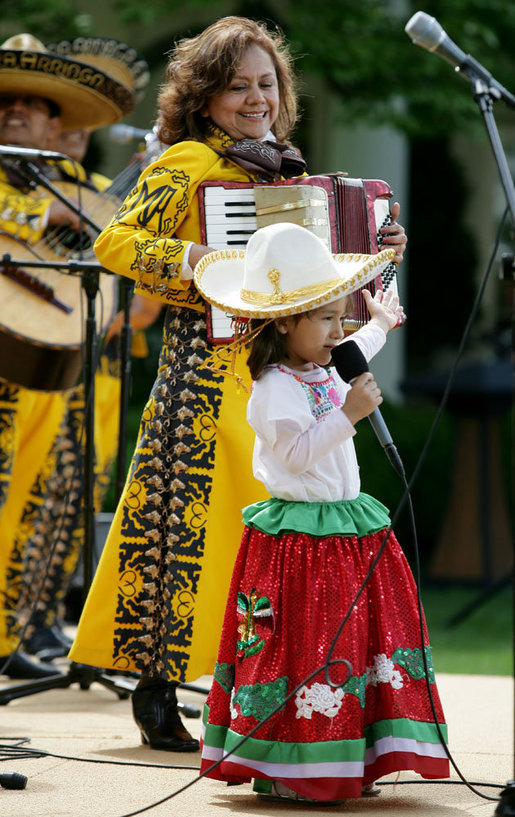
Cinco de Mayo performers at the White House

In addition to the federal/national holidays, many religious, ethnic, and other traditional holidays populate the calendar, as well as lighter celebrations. These are rarely observed by businesses as holidays; indeed, many are viewed as opportunities for commercial promotion. Because of this commercialization, some critics apply the deprecatory term Hallmark holiday to such days, after the Hallmark greeting card company.

- Groundhog Day, February 2
- Valentine's Day, February 14
- Saint Patrick's Day, March 17
- April Fool's Day, April 1
- Patriots' Day (Revolutionary War), April 15-21, floating Monday
- Earth Day, April 22
- Arbor Day, April 24–30, floating Friday
- May Day, May 1
- Cinco de Mayo, May 5
- Mother's Day, May 8–14, floating Sunday
- Flag Day, June 14
- Helen Keller Day, June 27
- Father's Day, June 15–21, floating Sunday
- Pioneer Day, July 24
- Women's Equality Day, August 26
- Patriot Day, September 11
- Constitution Day and Citizenship Day, September 17
- Oktoberfest, various days in September/October
- World Vegetarian Day, October 1 globally (initiating Vegetarian Awareness Month throughout October)
- Halloween, October 31
- Election Day (also Democracy Day), November 2–8, floating Tuesday
- Black Friday, November 23–29, floating Friday
- Small Business Saturday, November 24–30, floating Saturday
- Cyber Monday, November 26–December 2, floating Monday
- Pearl Harbor Remembrance Day, December 7
- New Year's Eve, December 31

== See also ==
- Christmas controversy
- Easter controversy
- Hallmark holiday
- Holidays with paid time off in the United States
- List of African-American holidays
- Mexican fiestas in the United States
- Public holidays in Puerto Rico
- Tax holiday
- United States federal observances
- Work–life balance in the United States
