= Pratap Jayanti =

Public holiday in Indian state of Rajasthan

Dharmarakshak Veer Shiromani Maharana Pratap Jayanti
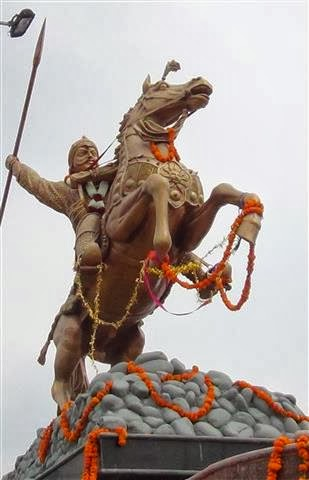
- Official name: Veer Shiromani Shri Maharana Pratap Jayanti
- Observed by: Predominantly Rajasthanis, but also in other parts of India
- Liturgical color: Saffron (color)
- Type: Historic, Ethnic
- Significance: Annual birth anniversary of Maharana Pratap
- Celebrations: Puja, Processions
- Date: 9 May
- Next time: 9 May 2027
- Frequency: Annual
- Started by: Akhil Bharatiya Kshatriya Mahasabha

Maharana Pratap Jayanti (Hindi: महाराणा प्रताप जयंती) is a festival and a public holiday in Rajasthan, marking the birth anniversary of the Indian ruler Maharana Pratap. It is usually celebrated on 9 May, but some also celebrate it on 22 May.

== Background ==
=== Date ===
The day is celebrated as the birth of Rajput king, Maharana Pratap born on 9 May 1540, though due to change from the Julian calendar to Gregorian calendar it has been calculated to be on 22nd date of month of May.

Though many Hindus celebrate the occasion as per the Hindu calendar on the 3rd lunar day of the month of Jyeshtha.

=== History ===
Though there is no specific mention of the start of celebration of the date, but it was observed in the Chittorgarh and Udaipur by the royal family of Mewar, later it was popularised by the Akhil Bharatiya Kshatriya Mahasabha in order to unite the Rajputs and as a method for pan-India identity to the Rajputs all over the India. The festival also gained popularity with the time due to the rise of Hindutva movement and symbolism of the day as Hindu resistance against the Muslim invasion.

== Celebrations ==
Pratap Jayanti is a public holiday in Rajasthan, where the day is celebrated with special Pujas and celebrations in Udaipur and Chittorgarh with processions and rallies in honor of Maharana Pratap. The day is also a public holiday in Haryana, Madhya Pradesh, Himachal Pradesh and Uttar Pradesh.

== See also ==
- Shiv Jayanti
