= Transit Equality Day =

American civil rights holiday

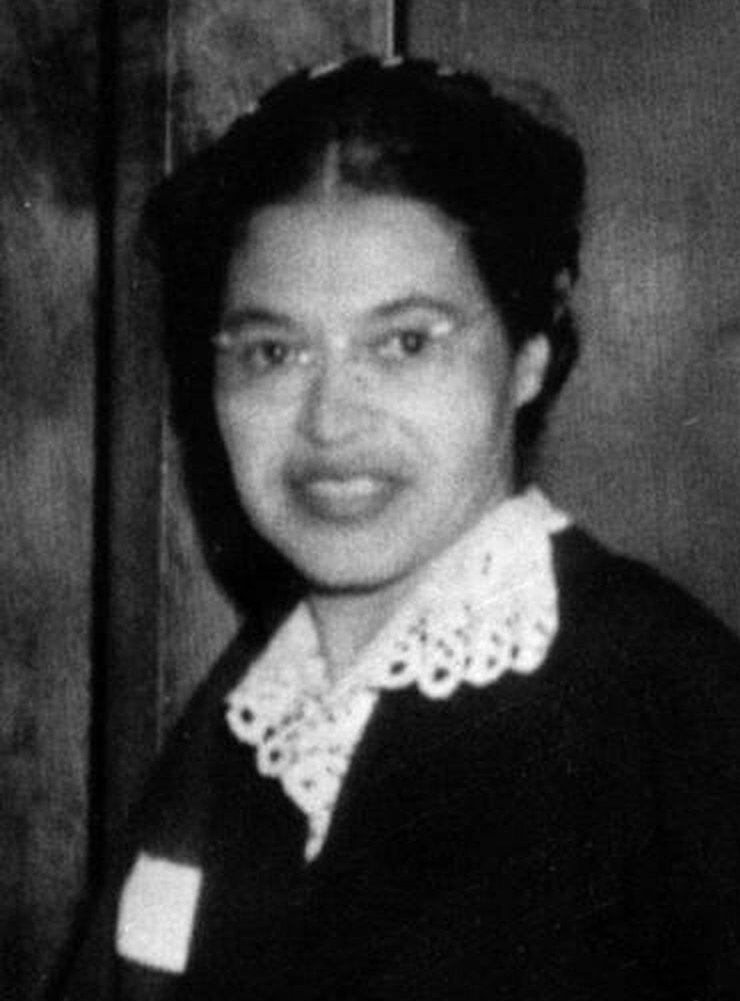
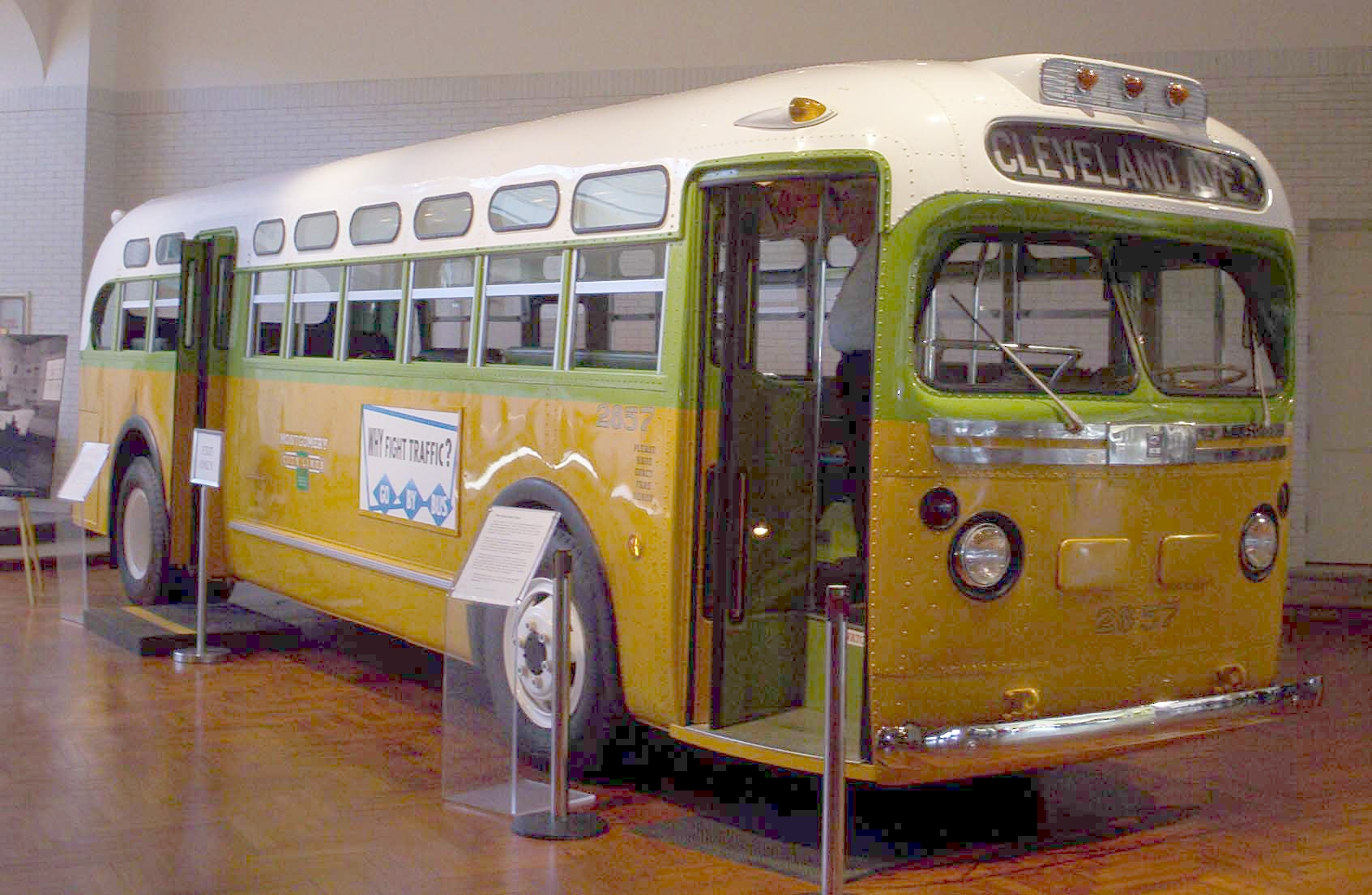
- Rosa Parks and the Montgomery Bus that made her notable
- Observed by: United States
- Type: African-American
- Significance: in honor of Rosa Parks, a civil rights activist
- Date: February 4
- Frequency: Annual

Transit Equality Day or "Transit Equity Day" is a holiday in honor of the civil rights leader Rosa Parks, celebrated in the United States on her birthday, February 4.

Rosa Parks Day was created by a network of Unions, including the Labor Sustainability Network, in 2017. It was first celebrated federally by Department of Transportation Secretary Pete Buttigieg in 2021, gaining wider celebration in 2023.

== Observances by states, cities and counties ==
Organization	State	Began
Metrolink	California	2023
North County Transit District	California	2023
Orange County Transportation Authority	California	2023
Ventura County all buses	California	2024
Regional Transportation District	Colorado	2025
Augusta	Georgia	2023
Metropolitan Atlanta Rapid Transit Authority	Georgia	2023
Maryland Transit Administration	Maryland	2023
Montgomery County	Maryland	2023
Metro Transit	Minnesota	2023
Charlotte Area Transit System	North Carolina	2023
TriMet	Oregon	2021
Arlington County	Virginia	2023
Roanoke	Virginia	2023
Suffolk County Transit	Virginia	2023
C-Tran	Washington	2026
Wisconsin	Wisconsin	2022

== Origins ==
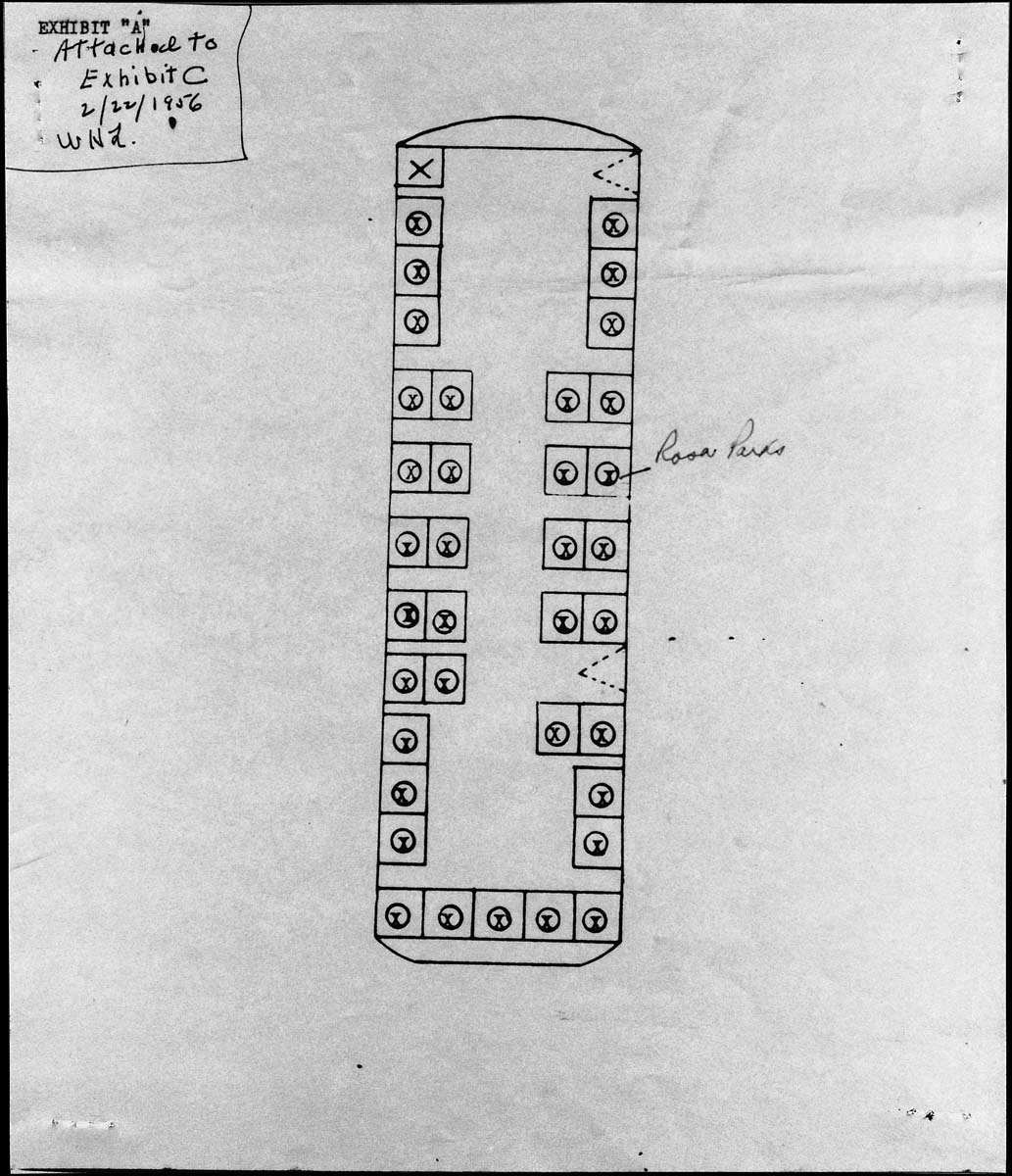
Seat layout on the bus where Parks sat, December 1, 1955

Rosa Parks (February 4, 1913 – October 24, 2005) was a seamstress by profession; she was also the secretary for the Montgomery chapter of the NAACP. Twelve years before her history-making arrest, Parks was stopped from boarding a city bus by driver James F. Blake, who ordered her to board at the back door and then drove off without her. Parks vowed never again to ride a bus driven by Blake. As a member of the NAACP, Parks was an investigator assigned to cases of sexual assault. In 1945, she was sent to Abbeville, Alabama, to investigate the gang rape of Recy Taylor. The protest that arose around the Taylor case was the first instance of a nationwide civil rights protest, and it laid the groundwork for the Montgomery bus boycott.

In 1955, Parks completed a course in "Race Relations" at the Highlander Folk School in Tennessee where nonviolent civil disobedience had been discussed as a tactic. On December 1, 1955, Parks was sitting in the frontmost row for black people. When a Caucasian man boarded the bus, the bus driver told everyone in her row to move back. At that moment, Parks realized that she was again on a bus driven by Blake. While all of the other black people in her row complied, Parks refused, and was arrested for failing to obey the driver's seat assignments, as city ordinances did not explicitly mandate segregation but did give the bus driver authority to assign seats. Found guilty on December 5, Parks was fined $10 plus a court cost of $4, but she appealed.

Rosa Parks' action gained notoriety leading to the Montgomery bus boycott, which was a seminal event in the civil rights movement, and was a political and social protest campaign against the policy of racial segregation on the public transit system of Montgomery, Alabama. The campaign lasted from December 1, 1955 – when Rosa Parks, an African-American woman, was arrested for refusing to surrender her seat to a white person – to December 20, 1956, when a federal ruling, Browder v. Gayle, took effect, and led to a United States Supreme Court decision that declared the Alabama and Montgomery laws requiring segregated buses to be unconstitutional. Many important figures in the civil rights movement took part in the boycott, including Reverend Martin Luther King Jr. and Ralph Abernathy. The 381-day boycott almost bankrupted the bus company and effectively made segregation in buses unconstitutional and illegal.

== See also ==
- Rosa Parks Day
- Claudette Colvin, who, nine months before Parks, refused to give up her seat on a Montgomery bus and was arrested
