= Public holidays in the United States Virgin Islands =

Holidays in the United States Virgin Islands include all official holidays of the United States as well as religious and secular holidays designated by the Government of the Virgin Islands.

== Public holidays ==
Date	Name	Remarks
January 1	New Year's Day	
January 6	Three Kings Day	
Third Monday in January	Martin Luther King, Jr. Day	
Third Monday in February	President's Day	
March 31	Transfer Day	Celebrates the transfer of the USVI from Denmark to the United States in 1917.
Thursday before Easter	Holy Thursday	
Friday before Easter	Good Friday	Easter is observed in the territory according to Western Christian traditions, i.e. (in summary), on the first Sunday following the first ecclesiastical full moon that occurs on or after March 21 (the day of the ecclesiastical vernal equinox).
Monday after Easter	Easter Monday	
Last Monday in May	Memorial Day	
June 19	Juneteenth	
July 3	Emancipation Day	Recognizes the abolition of slavery in the Danish West Indies in 1848.
July 4	American Independence Day	
First Monday in September	Labor Day	
Second Monday in October	Virgin Islands–Puerto Rico Friendship Day/Columbus Day	Established in 1964 to recognize the ties between the Virgin Islands and Puerto Rico.
November 1	Liberty Day	Also known as "Bull and Bread Day." A day to honor David Hamilton Jackson (1884–1946), a Virgin Islands labor rights leader from St. Croix.
November 11	Veterans Day	
Fourth Thursday in November	Thanksgiving Day	Schools remain closed Friday.
December 25	Christmas Day	
December 26	Second Day of Christmas	Also known as Boxing Day.

== Carnival ==
In addition to these holidays, all three islands celebrate multi-day carnivals. V.I. Carnival takes place in St. Thomas in April/May, St. John Carnival is in June/July, and St. Croix's Crucian Festival is in December/January. The Virgin Islands Government regularly grants administrative leave to its employees for various Carnival-related events (such as Food Fair, J'ouvert, Children's Parade and Adults' Parade), and schools are closed during the culmination of V.I. Carnival.

== See also ==
- List of holidays by country
