= Hallmark holiday =

Term for holiday created mainly for commercial purposes

In the United States and elsewhere, a Hallmark holiday is a holiday that is perceived to exist primarily for commercial purposes rather than to commemorate a traditionally or historically significant event.

== Background ==
The name comes from Hallmark Cards, a privately owned American company, that benefits from such manufactured events through sales of greeting cards and other items.

== Holidays that have been referred to as "Hallmark holidays" ==
- Boss's Day
- Mother's Day
- Father's Day
- Friendship Day
- Grandparents Day
- Groundhog Day
- National Doctors' Day
- National Nurses' Day
- Valentine's Day

== See also ==
- Anna Jarvis and Mother's Day
- Christmas in July in the Northern Hemisphere
- Trash of the Titans, an episode of The Simpsons which covers the issue with the satirical “Love Day”
- Valentine's Day
- List of food days
