= Malcolm X Day =

American holiday

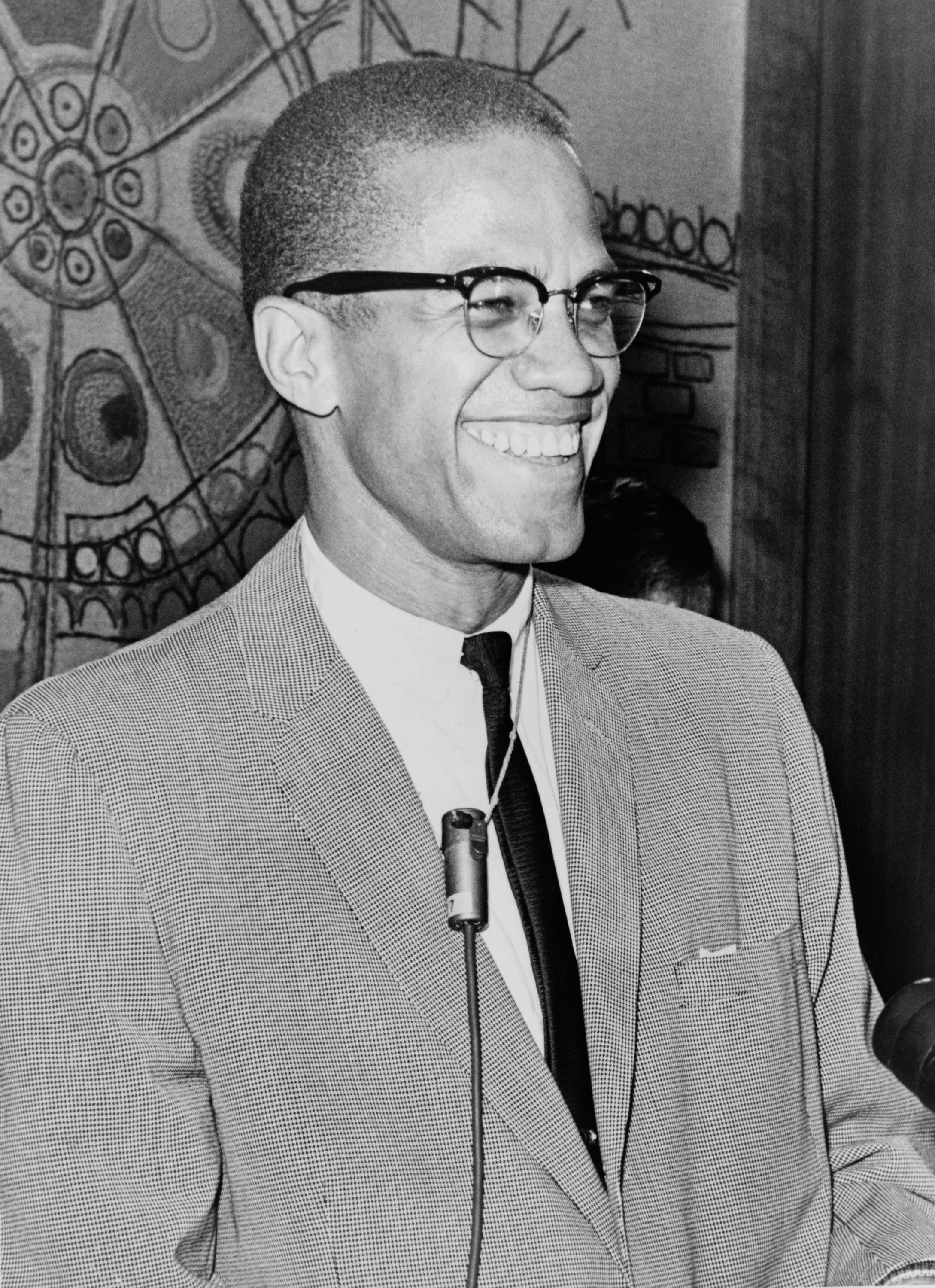
- Malcolm X in 1964
- Observed by: Berkeley, California, United States
- Type: Nationwide festivities Local holiday (May 19)
- Date: May 19
- 2025 date: May 16
- 2026 date: May 15
- 2027 date: May 21
- 2028 date: May 19
- Frequency: Annual

Malcolm X Day is an American holiday in honor of Malcolm X that is celebrated on either May 19 (his birthday) or the third Friday of May. The commemoration of the civil rights leader has been proposed as an official state holiday in the U.S. state of Illinois in 2015 and Missouri as recently as 2019. As of present, only the cities of Berkeley and Oakland in California observe the holiday, with city offices and schools closed.

== History ==
The Malcolm X Day holiday has been an official holiday in the municipality of Berkeley, California, since 1979. Since then, there have been multiple proposals for the holiday to be official elsewhere. In 2014, a proposal was put forth by the Council of Islamic Organizations of Chicago to make the holiday in the U.S. state of Illinois. The Illinois proposal differs from the Berkeley, California, resolution in that the holiday would be observed May 19 instead of the third Friday in May. Before that, unsuccessful attempts were made in Atlanta, Georgia, and Washington, D.C., with numerous calls for it to be celebrated alongside Martin Luther King Jr. Day as a federal holiday. In 1993, this holiday was proposed at the federal level to Congress as H.J.R. #323 by Congressman Charles Rangel. In 2015, the Illinois Senate unanimously passed the resolution for the official holiday designation where the law "... officially designated 'May 19, 2015, and every May 19 thereafter' as Malcolm X Day. Though the resolution passed making the holiday official, the Illinois official list of holidays still has yet to reflect the holiday.

== Observances by state ==
State	Current local observances
California	Holiday marked with an official event in San Jose and San Francisco. In Berkeley, California, there is currently a legal status on this holiday. This holiday has been in place since 1979.
District of Columbia	Schools such as the Malcolm X Elementary School in Washington, D.C., mark this holiday through UPEACE, US's DCPEACE program. The first known celebration of Malcolm X Day took place in Washington, D.C., in 1971. Was once proposed as a holiday.
Georgia	Holiday marked with festival since 1989 in Atlanta's West End Park. Was once proposed as a holiday.
Illinois	As of 2015, the holiday has a legal status in this state.
Minnesota	Malcolm X Day is celebrated with the Malcolm X Conference in Minneapolis.
Missouri	A house bill HB 172 was introduced to the state legislature for the observation of Malcolm X Day.
Nebraska	Malcolm X Day was celebrated in Malcolm X's birth city of Omaha starting in 1968. The holiday was celebrated from 1968 until at least 1997, with official proclamations from the City of Omaha for several years.
New York	Malcolm X Day is celebrated in the Harlem neighborhood of New York City with a music event.
Ohio	Malcolm X Day is celebrated with the "Malcolm X Heritage Festival" in Columbus, Ohio.
Oregon	Malcolm X Day is marked with a peaceful demonstration in Salem, Oregon.
Pennsylvania	Malcolm X Day became significant after the Ferguson unrest. Events are marked with community activities in Pittsburgh, Philadelphia, and other places.
Tennessee	Malcolm X Day is celebrated in Nashville.
Texas	Malcolm X Day is celebrated in San Antonio.
Washington	Malcolm X Day is marked with a music festival at Umojafest.
Wisconsin	Malcolm X Day is celebrated with a general public event with speakers in Milwaukee.

== See also ==
- Public holidays in the United States
- Bibliography of Malcolm X
- Bibliography of Martin Luther King Jr.
