= Susan B. Anthony Day =

Commemorative holiday in the U.S.

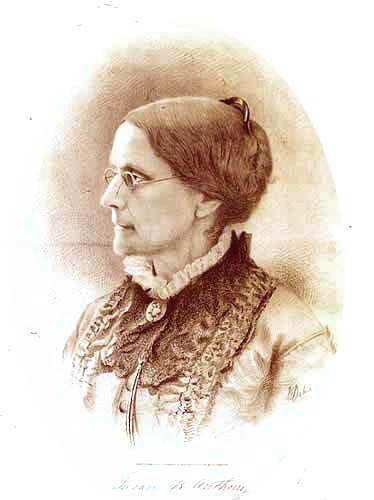
- Susan B. Anthony
- Observed by: (1) United States Florida legal holiday, state offices open (2) United States California and Wisconsin educational observance, schools open with related instructions (3) United States Massachusetts Local observance on August 26 (4) United States West Virginia state holiday on Election Day (Tuesday following 2nd Monday in November)
- Type: Florida legal holiday California and Wisconsin educational observances Massachusetts local observance West Virginia state holiday
- Date: February 15
- Next time: February 15, 2027
- Frequency: annual

Susan B. Anthony Day is a observed day (only a holiday in Florida) to celebrate the birth of Susan B. Anthony and women's suffrage in the United States. The day is February 15—Anthony's birthday.

== History ==
In 1976, the state of Wisconsin became the first state to officially enact Susan B. Anthony Day as an established state holiday. This holiday is not celebrated at a national level. In 1985, The Seattle Times reported on a campaign to establish the holiday as one celebrated nationally. (Other holidays that are not commemorated on an official federal level in the U.S. but widely observed are St. Patrick's Day and Arbor Day.) Today, several other states, including California, New York, and West Virginia, recognize the holiday.

On February 11, 2011, Representative Carolyn Maloney of New York introduced the "Susan B. Anthony Birthday Act" (H.R. #655) to the 112th Congress to honor the birthday as a U.S. national holiday on the third Monday of February. The bill was not enacted and thus died at the end of the 112th Congress.

== Observances by state ==
As of 2015, Florida is the only state honoring Susan B. Anthony Day as a legal holiday.

State	Current local observances
California	Declared a holiday for schools to honor in community services on February 15. Schools remain open.
Florida	Legislated as a legal holiday on February 15. Observances moved if day falls on a weekend.
New York	Holiday is observed on February 15.
West Virginia	Holiday is observed on Election Day
Wisconsin	Holiday is listed as an observance on February 15.
Massachusetts	MGL chapter 6, section 15E / Susan B. Anthony Day is celebrated on the 26th of August.

== Origins ==
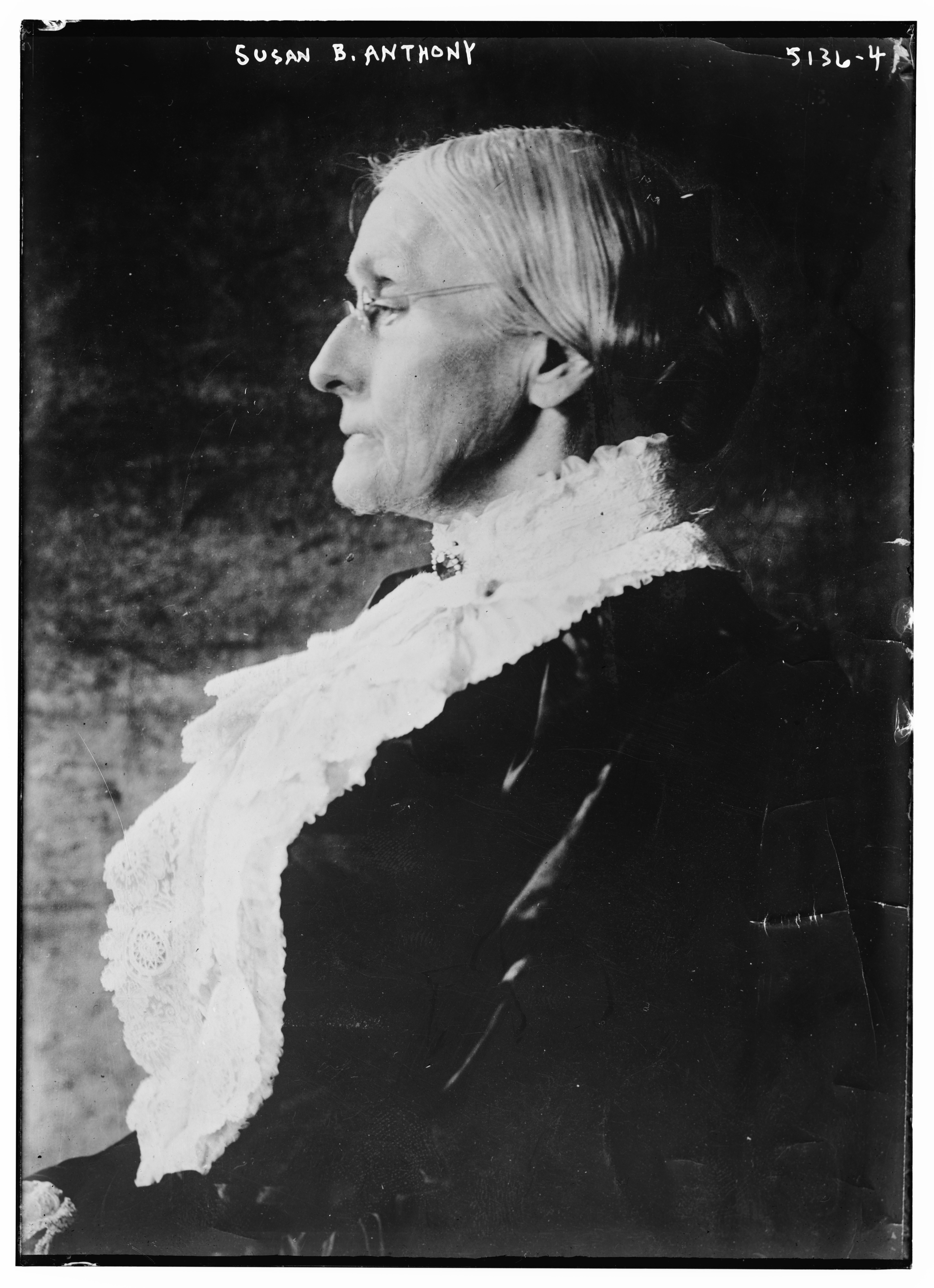
Susan B. Anthony in 1900

Susan B. Anthony is known for her leadership in the long campaign for women's right to vote in the United States and also abroad. She indicated her interest as early as 1852, when she attended the National Women's Rights Convention in Syracuse, New York. She was also a vigorous opponent of slavery. In 1863, during the American Civil War, she and Elizabeth Cady Stanton organized the Women's Loyal National League, the first national women's political organization in the U.S. It collected nearly 400,000 signatures on petitions to abolish slavery in the largest petition drive in the nation's history up to that time.

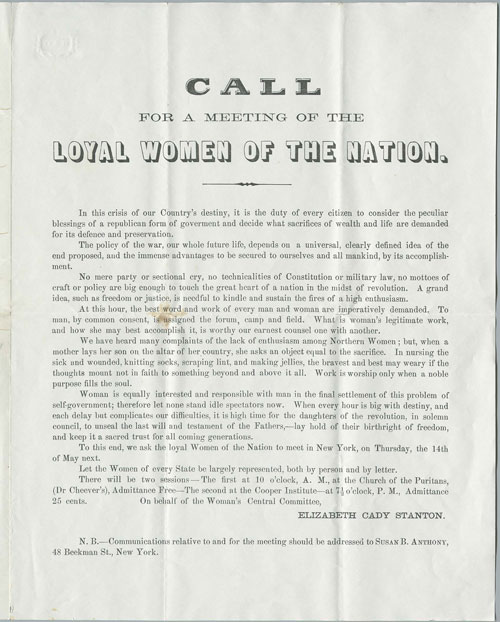
The call to the League's founding convention.

By the end of the Civil War, according to historian Ann D. Gordon, "Susan B. Anthony occupied new social and political territory. She was emerging on the national scene as a female leader, something new in American history, and she did so as a single woman in a culture that perceived the spinster as anomalous and unguarded ... By the 1880s, she was among the senior political figures in the United States."

After the Civil War, Anthony worked primarily for women's suffrage, the legal right of women to vote. This right was established over the course of several decades, first in various states and localities, sometimes on a limited basis. It was established nationally in 1920 with the passage of the Nineteenth Amendment to the United States Constitution, which had been introduced in Congress in 1878 by Senator Aaron A. Sargent, a friend of Anthony's. The amendment was popularly known as the Susan B. Anthony Amendment in recognition of her leadership in achieving its passage. She died in 1906, fourteen years before it became the law of the land.

== See also ==
- Public holidays in the United States
