= Rosa Parks Day =

American holiday in honor of Rosa Parks

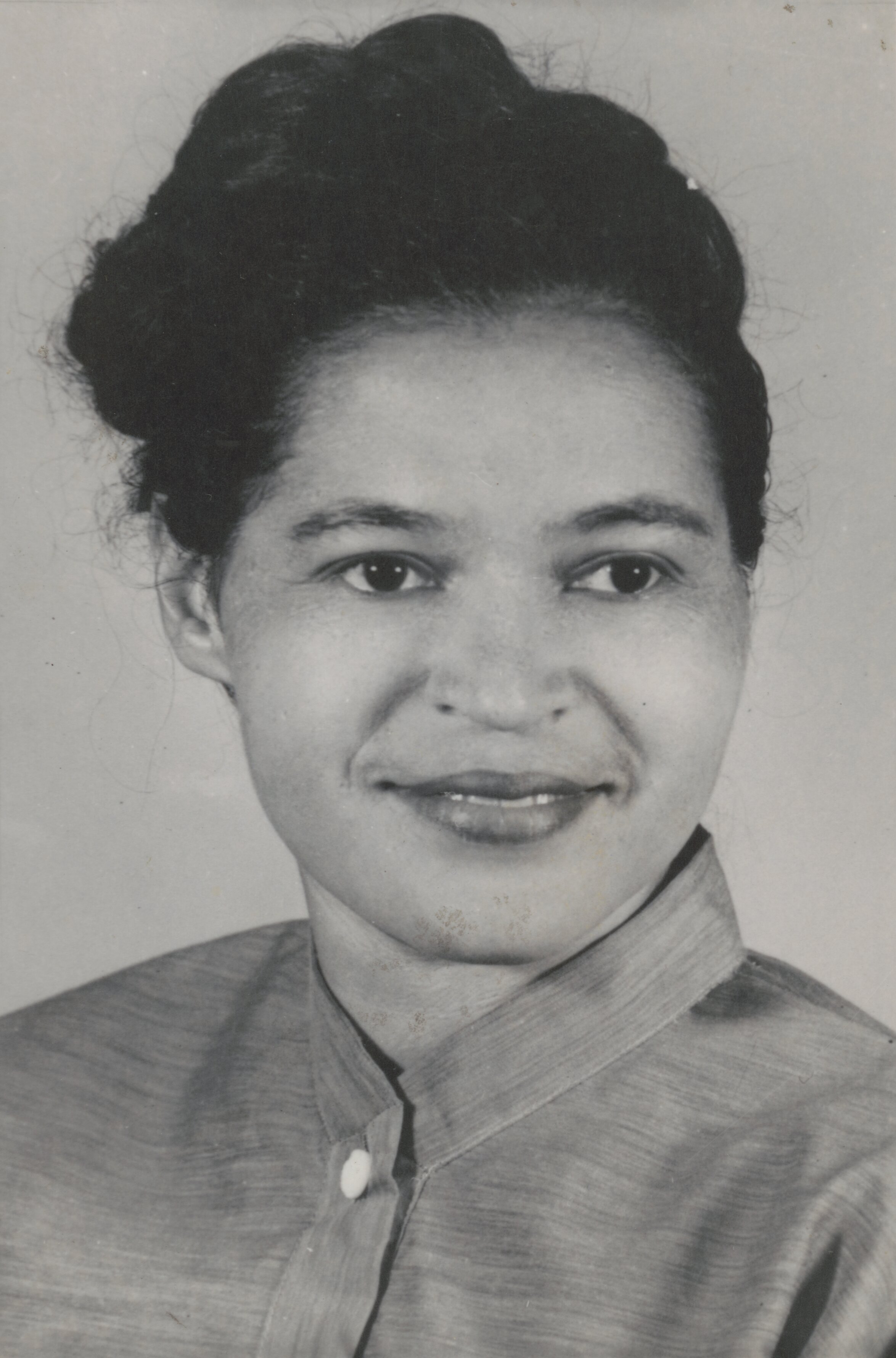
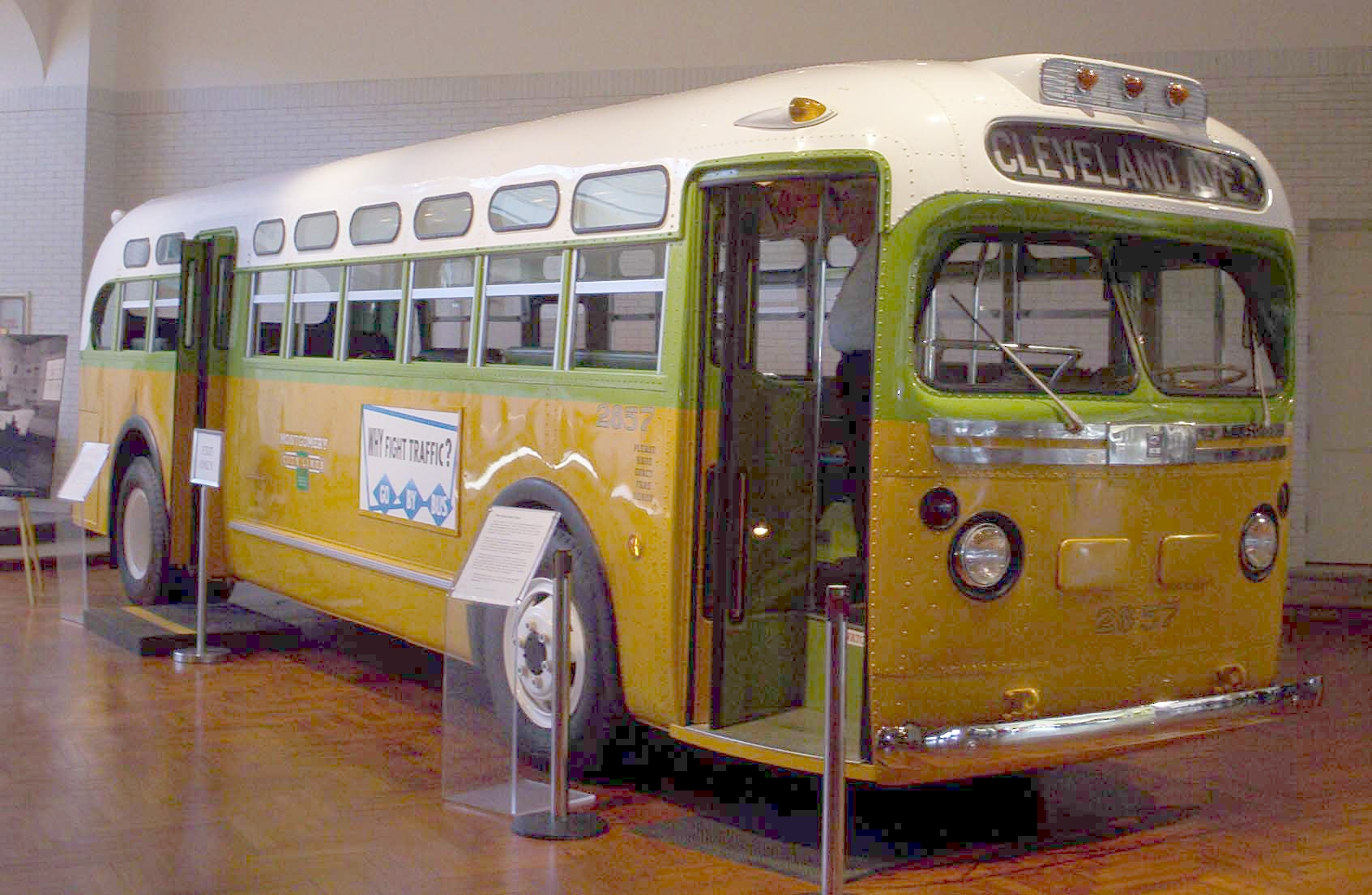
- Rosa Parks in 1956 and the Montgomery Bus that made her notable
- Observed by: United States (Alabama, California, Massachusetts, Michigan, Missouri, Ohio, Oregon, Texas, and Tennessee)
- Type: Secular
- Significance: in honor of Rosa Parks, a civil rights activist
- Date: February 4 (Massachusetts and Missouri), the 1st Monday after February 4 (California and Michigan), or December 1 (Alabama, Ohio, Oregon, Tennessee, and Texas.)
- Frequency: Annual

Rosa Parks Day is a holiday in honor of the civil rights leader Rosa Parks, celebrated in the U.S. states of Massachusetts and Missouri on her birthday, February 4; in California and Michigan on the first Monday after her birthday; and in Alabama, Ohio, Oregon, Tennessee, Texas and several cities and counties on the day she was arrested, December 1.

Rosa Parks Day was created by the Michigan State Legislature and first celebrated in 1998. The California State Legislature followed suit in 2000. The holiday was first designated in the U.S. state of Ohio championed by Joyce Beatty, advocate who helped Ohio's legislation pass to honor the late leader. It is also celebrated by the Columbus Ohio bus system (COTA) with a special tribute to the late civil rights leader.

As of 2014, Missouri Governor Jay Nixon proclaimed Rosa Parks Day official in the state. In 2014, Oregon governor John Kitzhaber declared that Oregon would celebrate its first Rosa Parks Day. In 2021, the Texas Legislature passed HB 3481, recognizing December 1 as Rosa Parks Day in the state. On January 8, 2025, championed by Rev. Wil Darcangelo, Minister at First Church of Christ, Unitarian, Massachusetts Gov. Maura Healey Signed Bill H.3075 setting aside February 4 as an annual recognition for the Commonwealth of Massachusetts. After Juneteenth became a federal holiday, there are growing calls for this day to also be observed at the federal level. On September 3, 2021, HR 5111 proposes that this day be added to the list of federal holidays.

== Observances by state ==
State	Current local observances	notes
California	The holiday was first observed on February 4, 2000, and every year thereafter on the first Monday following February 4, created by an act of the California legislature.	
Michigan	The holiday is observed on the first Monday after February 4 with the first observance occurring on February 9, 1998.	
Missouri	Rosa Parks Day made official February 4, 2015 by proclamation by Governor Jay Nixon.	
Alabama	Holiday is observed on December 1, the day Rosa Parks was arrested.	First celebrated in 2018
Ohio	Holiday is observed on December 1, the day Rosa Parks was arrested.	
Oregon	Holiday is observed on December 1, the day Rosa Parks was arrested.	
Texas	Holiday is observed on December 1, the day Rosa Parks was arrested.	
Tennessee	Holiday is observed on December 1, the day Rosa Parks was arrested.	First celebrated in 2019
Massachusetts	Rosa Parks Day made official January 8, 2025 by proclamation by Governor Maura Healey for annual observation on February 4.	

=== Observances by cities and counties ===
City	State	Date celebrated	notes
Paterson	New Jersey	December 1st	First celebrated in 2021
Montgomery County	Alabama	December 1st	First celebrated in 2020
Montgomery County	Maryland	December 1st	First celebrated in 2020
Gainesville	Florida	December 1st	First celebrated in 2022
Huntsville	Alabama	December 1st	First celebrated in 2018

== Origins ==
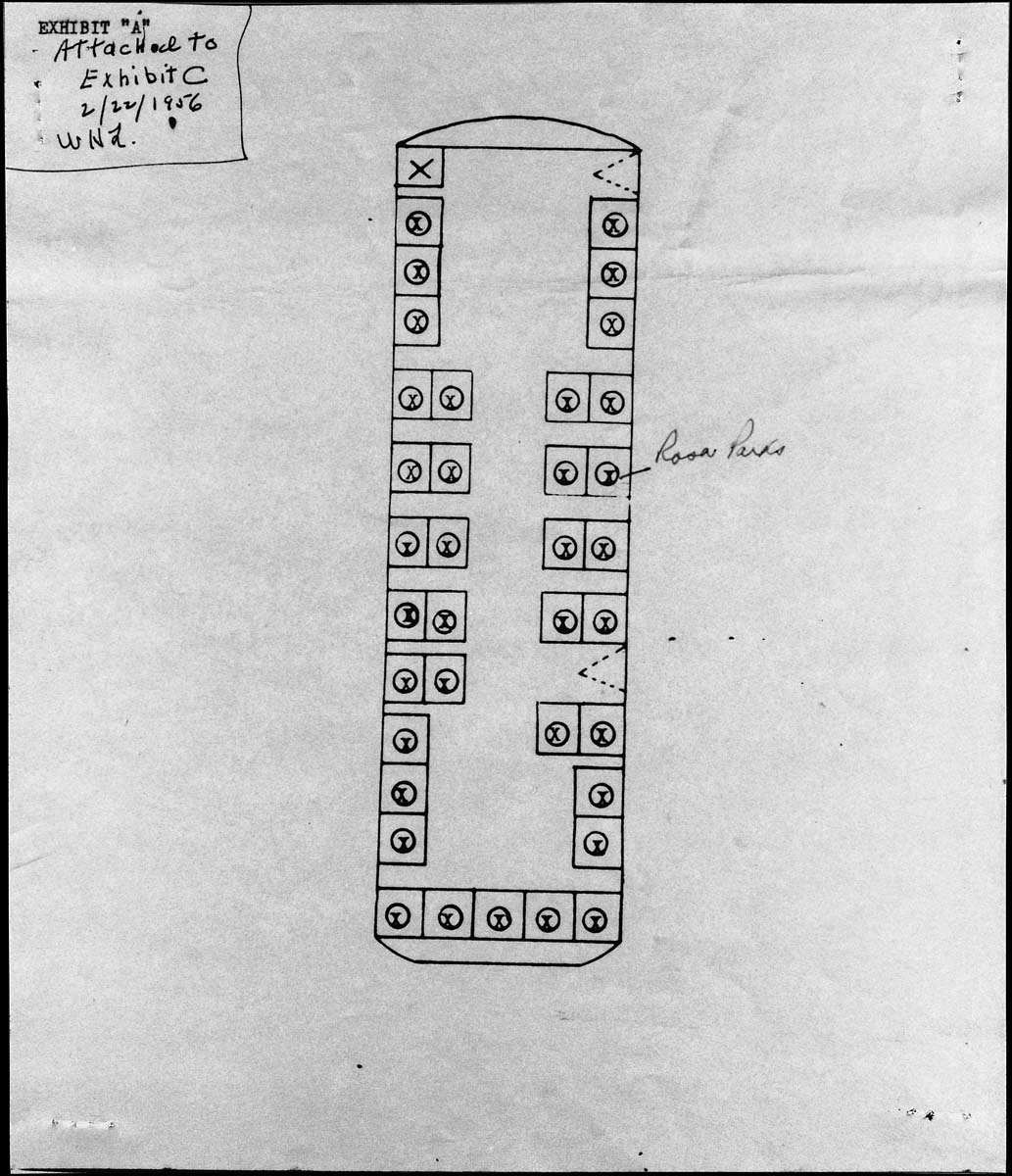
Seat layout on the bus where Parks sat, December 1, 1955

Rosa Parks (February 4, 1913 – October 24, 2005) was a seamstress by profession; she was also the secretary for the Montgomery chapter of the NAACP. Twelve years before her history-making arrest, Parks was stopped from boarding a city bus by driver James F. Blake, who ordered her to board at the back door and then drove off without her. Parks vowed never again to ride a bus driven by Blake. As a member of the NAACP, Parks was an investigator assigned to cases of sexual assault. In 1945, she was sent to Abbeville, Alabama, to investigate the gang rape of Recy Taylor. The protest that arose around the Taylor case was the first instance of a nationwide civil rights protest, and it laid the groundwork for the Montgomery bus boycott.

In 1955, Parks completed a course in "Race Relations" at the Highlander Folk School in Tennessee where nonviolent civil disobedience had been discussed as a tactic. On December 1, 1955, Parks was sitting in the frontmost row for black people. When a Caucasian man boarded the bus, the bus driver told everyone in her row to move back. At that moment, Parks realized that she was again on a bus driven by Blake. While all of the other black people in her row complied, Parks refused, and was arrested for failing to obey the driver's seat assignments, as city ordinances did not explicitly mandate segregation but did give the bus driver authority to assign seats. Found guilty on December 5, Parks was fined $10 plus a court cost of $4, but she appealed.

Parks' action gained notoriety leading to the Montgomery bus boycott, which was a seminal event in the civil rights movement, and was a political and social protest campaign against the policy of racial segregation on the public transit system of Montgomery, Alabama. The campaign lasted from December 1, 1955, to December 20, 1956, when a federal ruling, Browder v. Gayle, took effect, and led to a United States Supreme Court decision that declared the Alabama and Montgomery laws requiring segregated buses to be unconstitutional. Many important figures in the civil rights movement took part in the boycott, including Reverend Martin Luther King Jr. and Ralph Abernathy. The 381-day boycott almost bankrupted the bus company and effectively made segregation in buses unconstitutional and illegal.

== See also ==
- Transit Equality Day
- Public holidays in the United States
- Claudette Colvin, who refused to move from her seat on a Montgomery bus and was arrested nine months before Parks
