= Harriet Tubman Day =

American holiday observed on March 10

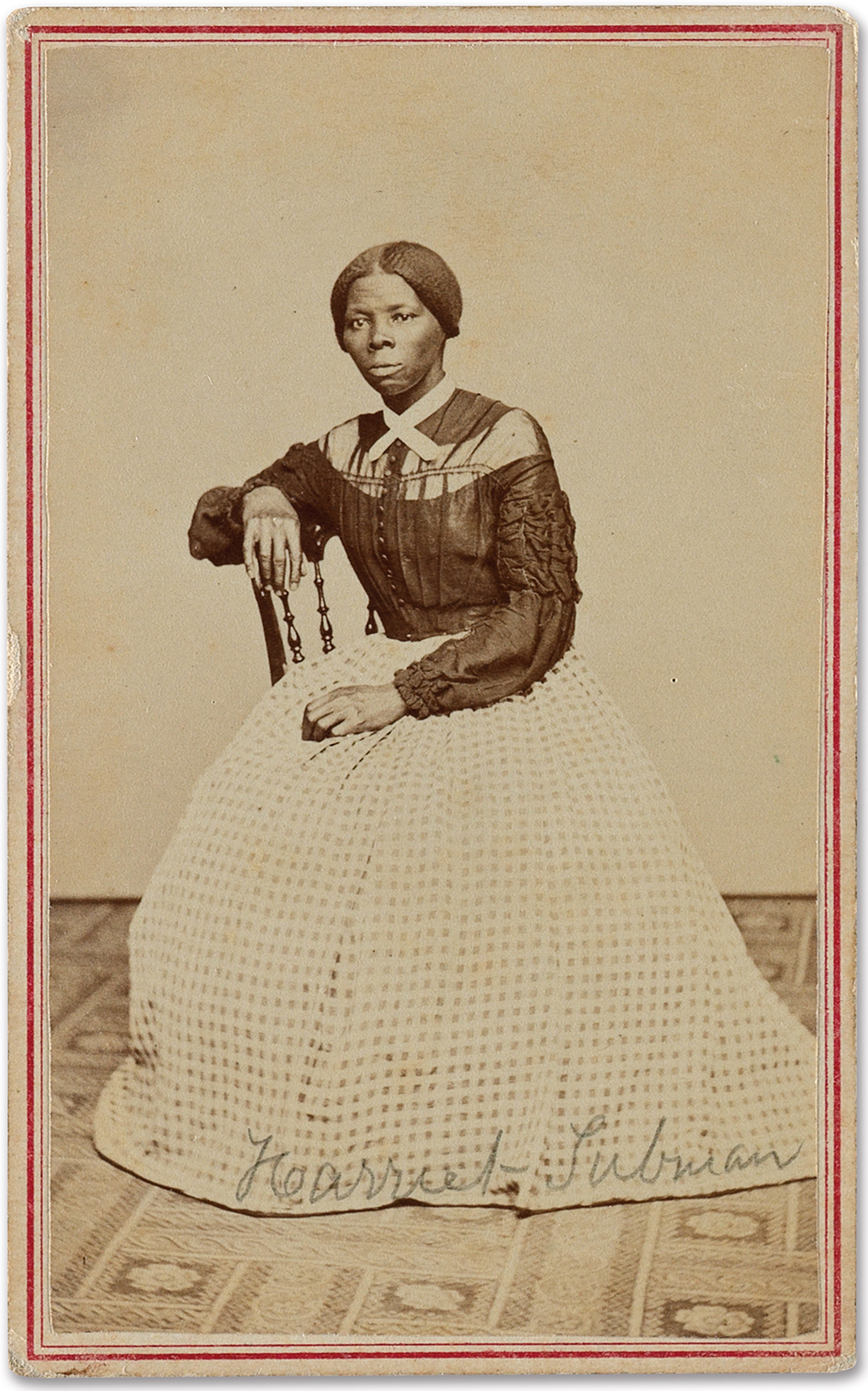
- Tubman, c. 1868/1869
- Observed by: United States (New York)
- Type: (1) National observance (2) New York State observance (3) Liturgical (Episcopal Church in the United States of America)
- Date: March 10
- Frequency: annual

Harriet Tubman Day is an American holiday in honor of abolitionist Harriet Tubman, observed on March 10, and in the U.S. state of New York. Observances also occur locally around the U.S. state of Maryland.

== History ==
The holiday was approved as Public Law 101-252 by the 101st Congress in a joint resolution on March 13, 1990. The law was considered and passed by the U.S. Senate on March 6, 1990 and then was considered and passed through the U.S. House of Representatives on March 7, 1990. U.S. President George H. W. Bush gave Proclamation 6107 on March 9, 1990 proclaiming the holiday.

In February 1995, Christ Episcopal Church, Great Choptank Parish, in Cambridge, Maryland celebrated (via a "service of song and word") Tubman's nomination, the previous year, to the liturgical Calendar of Saints of the Episcopal Church. The parish is the home of Dorchester County's Harriet Tubman Coalition. Final approval of naming her a saint occurred at the 1997 General Convention, and Tubman is now commemorated together with Amelia Bloomer, Elizabeth Cady Stanton, and Sojourner Truth in the calendar of saints of the Episcopal Church on July 20. The calendar of saints of the Evangelical Lutheran Church in America remembers Tubman and Truth on March 10, which is also her date of birth.

== Observances by state ==
State	Current local observances
Maryland	Louis C. Fields, President of the African American Tourism Council of MD is the founder of Harriet Ross Tubman Day of Remembrance in the State of Maryland in year 2000. Fields requested former State Senator Clarence Mitchell IV (C4) to introduce legislation to have the State of Maryland designate and annually recognize March 10 as officially Harriet Ross Tubman Day of Remembrance in the State of Maryland. The resolution passed both the House of Delegates and the Maryland Senate in March 2000. Annually, Fields hosts the Tubman Day celebrations across the State of Maryland and on a date closest to March 10, Fields hosts the annual Harriet Ross Tubman Day in Annapolis at the Maryland General Assembly. Annually, the Governor of Maryland issues the State's Harriet Tubman Day Proclamation proclaiming March 10 as Harriet Ross Tubman in MD. Also, each year Fields selects a deserving person to be the recipient of the Harriet Ross Tubman Lifetime Achievement Award presented in the Maryland General Assembly. The program includes an annual Tubman lecture (2016-Dr. Dale Green, MSU professor) and the reading of the Governor's proclamation by a United States Naval Academy Midshipman. President Barack Obama designated a part of Dorchester county as a National Harriet Tubman Park. Past Tubman Day Awardees include... 2016-Janice Greene Curtis, Tubman re-enactor, storyteller. 2015-Dr. Ruth J. Pratt, educator. 2014-Marsha Jews, Planner, Media personality. 2013-Barbara Tagger, NPS administrator. 2012-Senator Barbara Mikulski. 2011-Dr. Clara Smalls, educator. 2010-Delegate Adrienne Jones. 2009-Bettye McLeod. 2008-Verda Day-Jones, actress (deceased) & Louise Webb-historian. 2007-Dr. Kay McElvey, historian, educator. 2006-Wylene Burch, educator, museum founder (deceased). 2005-Delegate Hattie Harrison & Delegate Ruth Kirk (both deceased). 2004-Rachel Hall Brown, educator, author, (deceased). 2003-Evelyn Townsend, educator (deceased). 2002-Addie Richburg, UGRR advocate. 2001-Dr. Thelma Daley, educator, Vice-Chair NCNW. 2000-Dr. Joanne Martin, museum founder update 2017: The March 2017 Maryland Tubman Day program will be held in Annapolis, Maryland to coincide the grand opening of the Harriet Tubman Museum & Discovery Center in Cambridge, Maryland on Tubman Day, March 10, 2017. A Harriet Tubman Underground Railroad Conference is held in Cambridge during June each year. Source: Lou Fields, Founder, Tubman Day in MD. 2016: Governor of Maryland Larry Hogan issued a proclamation which was read by Midshipman from the U.S. Naval Academy. A symposium is held on March 10 at the Harriet Tubman Byway.
New York	The holiday is a legal observance in the state. As of 2003, the holiday was made official in the U.S. state of New York. The bill was sponsored by State Senator Michael F. Nozzolio, and was passed as Bill #A2087. In Auburn, New York, Mayor Michael D. Quill, Sr. issued an official proclamation.

== Origins ==
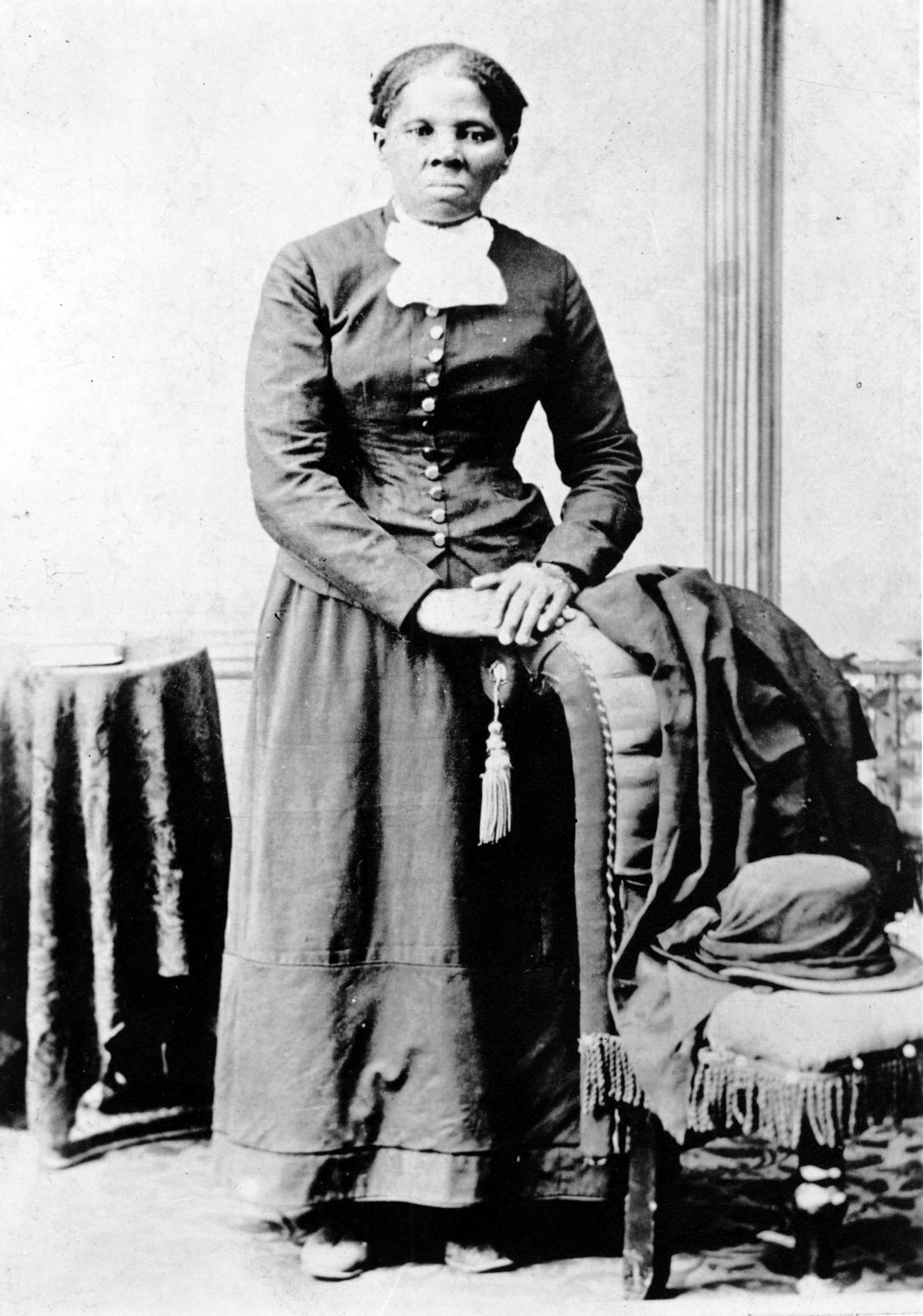
Harriet Tubman (photo H. B. Lindsley), c. 1870. A worker on the Underground Railroad, Tubman made 13 trips to the South, helping to free over 70 people. She led people to the northern free states and Canada. This helped Harriet Tubman gain the name "Moses of Her People".

Harriet Tubman (born Araminta Ross; c. 1822 – March 10, 1913) was an American abolitionist, humanitarian, and an armed scout and spy for the United States Army during the American Civil War. Born into slavery, Tubman escaped and subsequently made some thirteen missions to rescue approximately seventy enslaved families and friends, using the network of antislavery activists and safe houses known as the Underground Railroad. She later helped abolitionist John Brown to recruit men for his raid on the Harpers Ferry. In the post-war era she was an active participant in the struggle for women's suffrage.

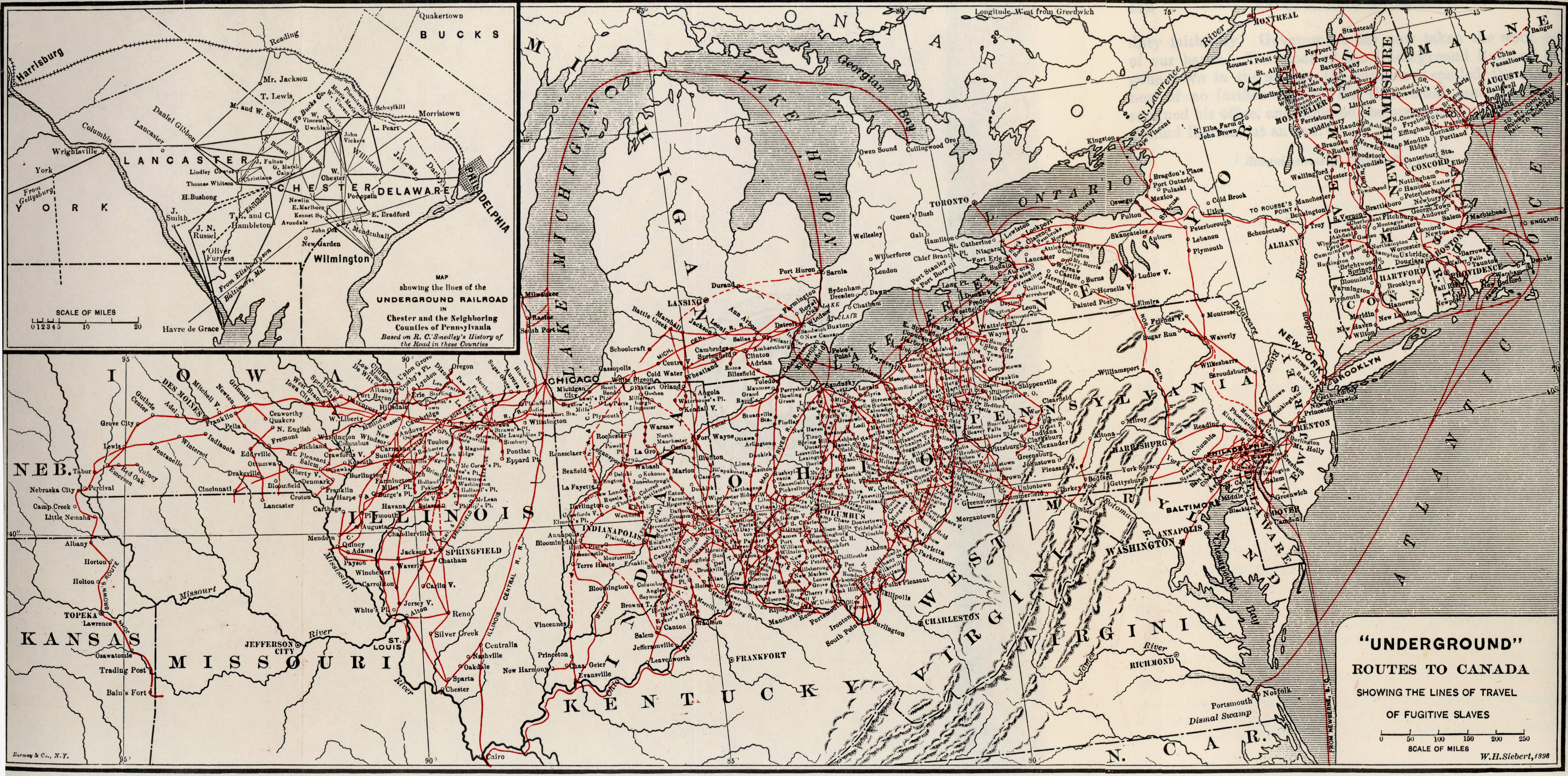
Map of various Underground Railroad routes

When the Civil War began, Tubman worked for the Union Army, first as a cook and nurse, and then as an armed scout and spy. The first woman to lead an armed expedition in the war, she guided the raid at Combahee Ferry, which liberated more than 700 slaves. After the war, she retired to the family home on property she had purchased in 1859 in Auburn, New York, where she cared for her aging parents. She was active in the women's suffrage movement until illness overtook her and she had to be admitted to a home for elderly African-Americans that she had helped to establish years earlier. After she died in 1913, she became an icon of American courage and freedom.
