= National Day of Spain =

National holiday of Spain (October 12)

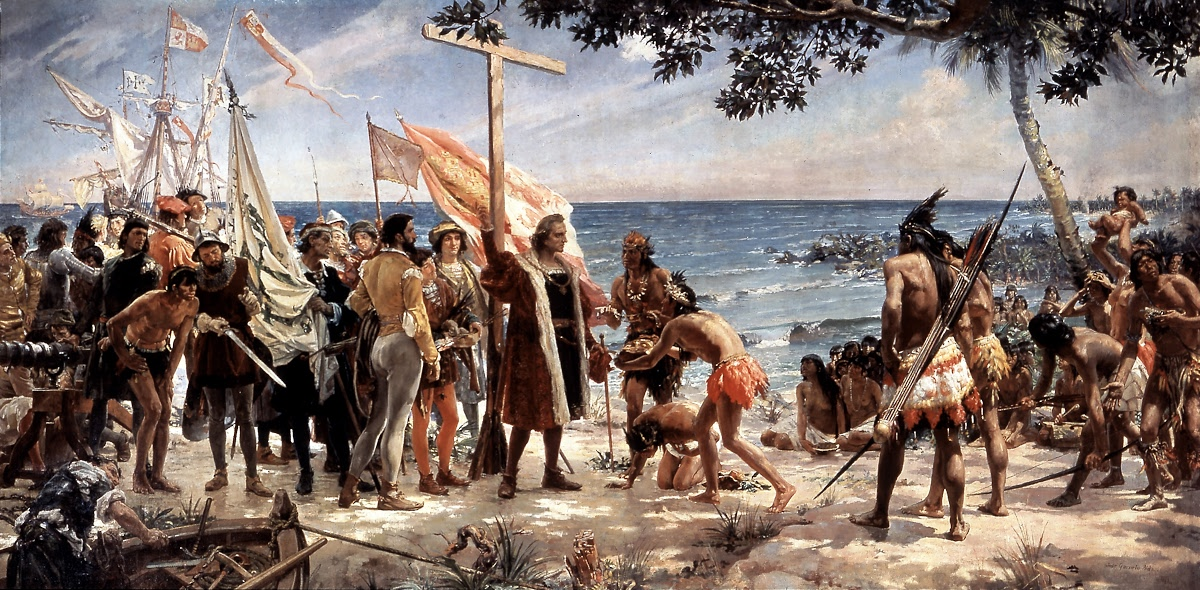
- First Tribute to Columbus (12 October 1492), by José Garnelo y Alda (1892), Naval Museum of Madrid
- Official name: Fiesta Nacional de España
- Also called: Día de la Hispanidad
- Observed by: Spain
- Type: National
- Significance: Commemorates the arrival of Christopher Columbus in the Americas in 1492
- Celebrations: Military parades, cultural events, official speeches
- Observances: National ceremonies, flag raising, flyovers by the Spanish Air Force
- Date: 12 October
- Next time: 12 October 2027
- Frequency: Annual
- Related to: Hispanic Day (Americas), Columbus Day, Indigenous Peoples' Day

The National Day of Spain (Spanish: Fiesta Nacional de España) is a national holiday held annually on 12 October. It is also traditionally and commonly referred to as the Día de la Hispanidad (Hispanicity, Spanishness Day), commemorating Spanish legacy worldwide, especially in Hispanic America.

The National Day of Spain is the day of celebration on which the Spanish people commemorate the country's history, recognize and appreciate achievements, reconfirm their commitment to the nation's future. The day celebrates unity and fraternity, and also shows Spain's ties with the international community.

Spanish law declares:

" The date chosen, 12 October, symbolizes the historical anniversary on which Spain, about to conclude a process of State construction based on our cultural and political diversity, and the integration of the kingdoms of Spain into the same monarchy, begins a period of linguistic and cultural projection beyond the boundaries of Europe. "

National Day of Spain commemorates the discovery of the Americas by Christopher Columbus for Spain on 12 October 1492. The date is a key point for Spain's overseas influence and legacy to the world and to the Americas in particular. It symbolizes Spain's vast, common heritage with today's American countries, which made up the Spanish Empire, the first global power in world history.

12 October is also the official Spanish language day, the Feasts of both Our Lady of the Pillar and the Virgin of Zapopan as well as the Day of the Spanish Armed Forces.

12 October is also an official holiday in much of Hispanic America, though under varying names (Día de la Hispanidad, Día de la Raza, Día del Respeto a la Diversidad Cultural, Día de la Resistencia Indígena, etc.). To varying degrees, these holidays celebrate the historical and cultural ties among Hispanic American countries, ties between them and Spain, and their common Hispanic and pre-Hispanic indigenous American heritage. Furthermore, on the second Monday in October, the United States celebrates Columbus Day/ Indigenous Peoples' Day.

== Observance ==
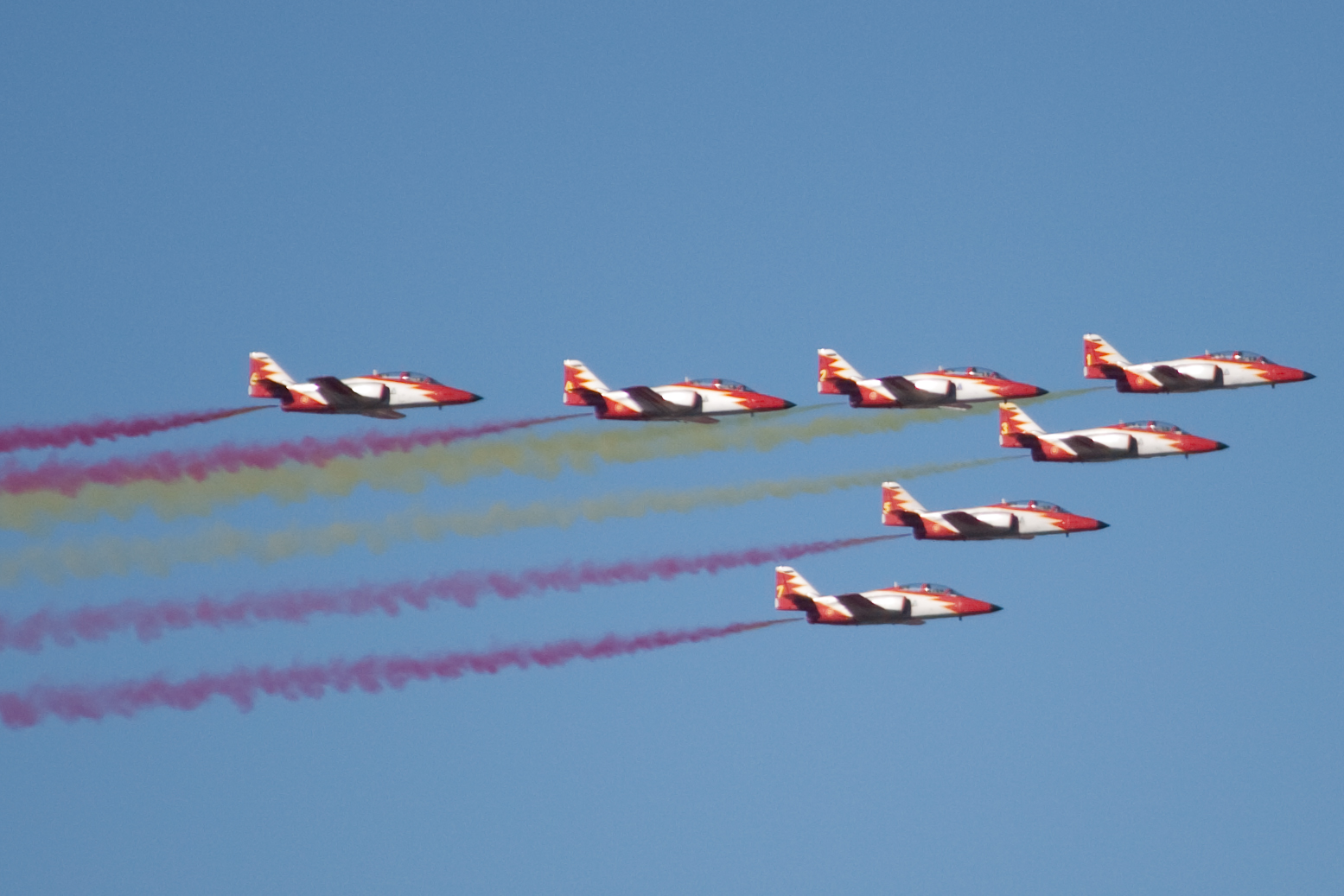
The Spanish Air Force’s Patrulla Águila (Eagle Patrol) performing an aerial display with smoke forming the Spanish flag during the Armed Forces Parade.

National Day of Spain is a holiday throughout the entire country, so all central (national) government's and autonomous communities' (provincial) institutions and administration offices are closed on that day, as are banks and stores. National Day is celebrated in Spain through numerous public and private events organized throughout the country to praise the nation's heritage, history, society and people. The festivity is also celebrated by Spanish communities worldwide. Solemn acts of tribute to the national flag take place at different locations in Spain and abroad. The most important by far is the one held in the capital, Madrid, along with the Armed Forces parade. Other tribute, cultural, religious and vindicative parades and demonstrations are also organized by participants from civil society across Spain.

== Origins and evolution ==
The coat of arms of Spain displays symbols from both medieval and modern Spain, as well as the key transition between them: the discovery of the New World. This is represented by the motto "PLUS ULTRA" ("further beyond"), which replaced the earlier "NON PLUS ULTRA" ("nothing further beyond") associated with the Pillars of Hercules, today's Strait of Gibraltar, once considered the edge of the known world since antiquity.

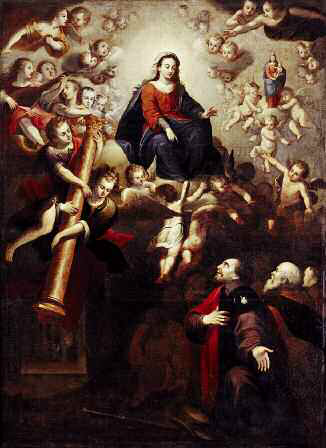
Procession of Our Lady of the Pillar arriving in Zaragoza, the capital of Aragon.

The distant origin of the holiday is to be found in the Roman Catholic tradition of the Virgin Mary's apparition "in flesh and blood" in Caesaraugusta (Zaragoza's name under the Roman Empire) to Apostle Saint James the Greater in AD 40 where a temple was built by the river Ebro, the first in the world dedicated to the cult of Saint Mary. Pilgrimage to Zaragoza to venerate Our Lady of the Pillar started in the early 8th century. Together with Saint James in Compostela, the spirituality of Christians in the Iberian Peninsula has centered around Our Lady of the Pillar for centuries.

On 27 May 1642 the city of Zaragoza designated Our Lady of the Pillar as a symbol of Hispanidad (Hispanicity), and the date became a feast in commemoration of the appearance of La Virgen del Pilar in the city.

In 1730, Pope Clement XII allowed the feast of Our Lady of the Pillar to be celebrated all over the Spanish Empire from then on.

On 23 September 1892 the queen regent of Spain, Maria Christina of Austria, promulgated a Royal Decree in San Sebastián, as proposed by the Prime Minister, Antonio Cánovas del Castillo, declaring 12 October 1892 a national day in commemoration of the 4th centenary of the discovery of America.

The preamble of that decree states the government had "considered appropriate to explore the position of all the American countries and Italy, as homeland of Columbus, to see if, by joint agreement, that commemoration could be vested with greater importance."

The preamble continues pointing out that "most governments of America have already adhered to the idea in principle, like that of the United States as well as those of the Hispanic American republics, with few exceptions, maybe because of temporary circumstances, which shall probably not prevent a unanimous resolution, and, for its part, the Government of his S.M. the King of Italy has also welcomed the invitation in the most cordial and satisfactory way." It is further stressed the opportunity of "perpetuating" such a commemoration as a National Day of Spain.

Hispanicity was celebrated again in Spain from 1935, when the first festival was held in Madrid. The day was known as Día de la Hispanidad ("Day of Hispanicity"), emphasizing Spain's connection to the international Hispanic community.

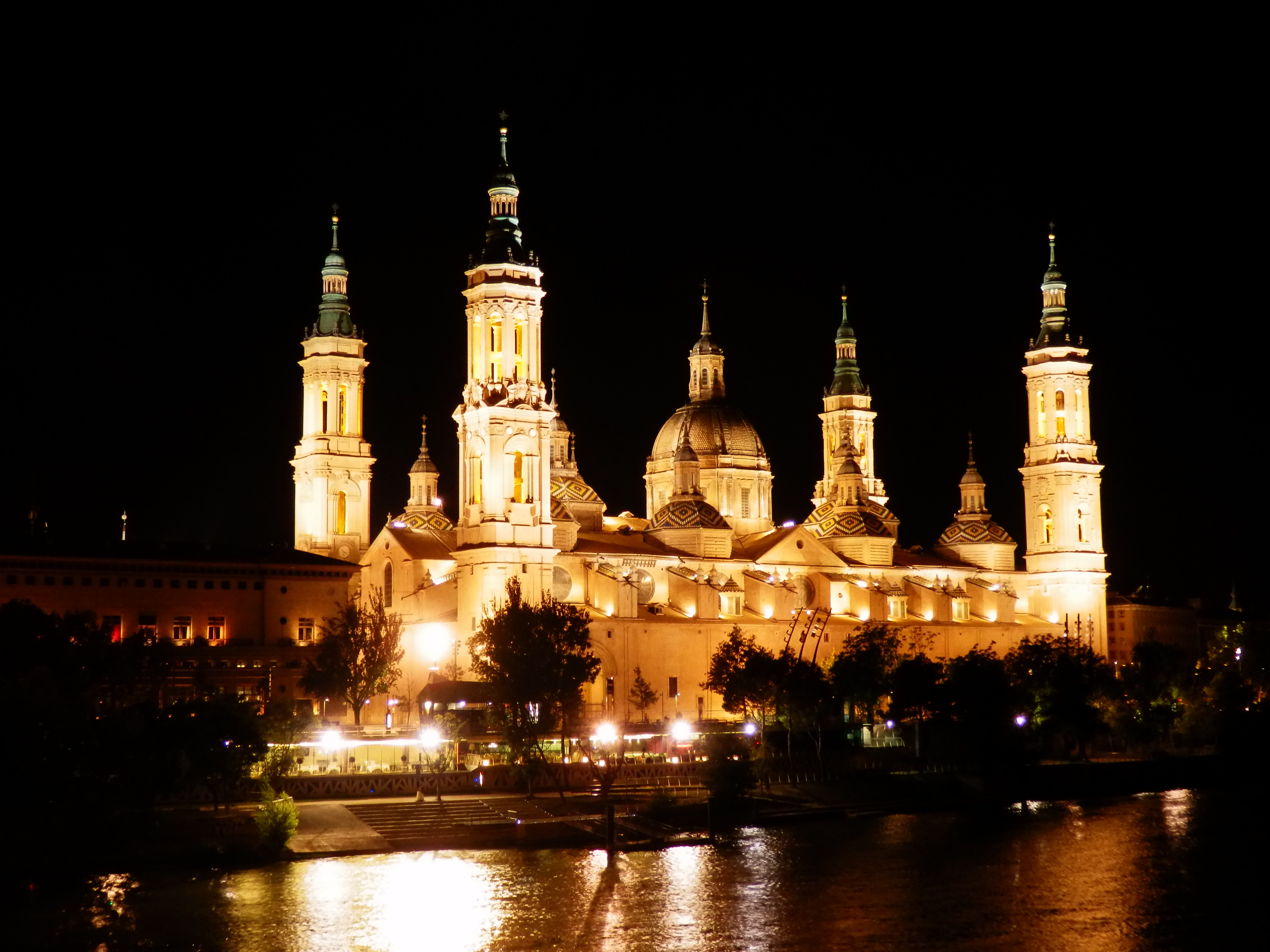
The Cathedral-Basilica of Our Lady of the Pillar in Zaragoza, Spain.

Hispanicity linked to the Cathedral-Basilica of Our Lady of the Pillar as historical background and symbol of the National Day of Spain are well expressed in a 1939 letter addressed by an Argentinian donor, Doña Soledad Alonso de Drysdale, to the Spanish government regarding the fundraising to complete the building of the last two of four towers of the Cathedral of the Pillar:

If, effectively, the funding comes from Hispanic America, these two towers will become an enviable symbol of Hispanicity (Spanishness), raised in the capital city of the kingdom that advanced the money used for the discovery of the New Word. (...) One second of January, feast of the Coming of the Virgin Mary in mortal flesh to Zaragoza, Granada surrendered to the Catholic Monarchs; Isabel and Ferdinand could dedicate time and thought to the enterprise proposed to them by the great navigator ; on a twelfth of October, feast of Our Lady of the Pillar, the three immortal caravels arrived at the first American lands. (...) If the architecture of the cathedral is completed and culminated with money from overseas, the symbolic value of the Holy Metropolitan Temple as Sanctuary of Hispanicity will have been totally affirmed.

from the original:

«Si, en efecto, de la América Hispana viene el dinero, esas dos torres serán un símbolo envidiable de hispanidad, levantado en la capital del reino que anticipó el dinero para el descubrimiento del Nuevo Mundo. (...) En un día dos de enero, fiesta de la Venida de la Virgen en carne mortal a Zaragoza, se rendía Granada a los Reyes Católicos y podían dedicar Isabel y Fernando tiempo y meditaciones a la empresa que les proponía el gran navegante; en un día 12 de octubre, fiesta de Nuestra Señora del Pilar, las tres inmortales carabelas llegaban a las primeras tierras americanas. (...) Si es con dinero de Ultramar como (...) se completa y corona la arquitectura de la catedral, el valor simbólico del Santo Templo Metropolitano como Santuario de la Hispanidad habrá quedado consagrado totalmente.

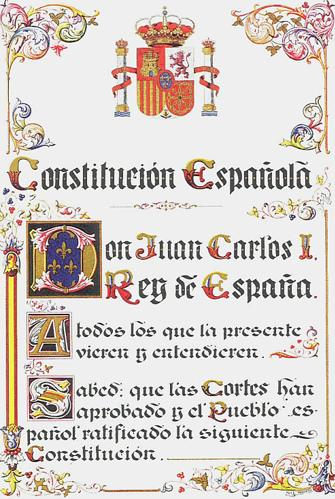
First page of the Spanish Constitution of 1978, the ninth fundamental law in the history of Spanish constitutionalism since the Spanish Constitution of 1812.

In 1981, soon after the approval of the Spanish Constitution of 1978, the national day is renamed "Fiesta Nacional de España y Día de la Hispanidad" by Royal Decree On 7 October 1987, the reference to Hispanidad is discarded and the name is changed again to Fiesta Nacional. 12 October became one of two national celebrations, along with Constitution Day on December 6.

Spain's "national day" had moved around several times during the various regime changes of the 20th century. Establishing it on the day of the international Discovery of America celebration was part of a compromise between conservatives, who wanted to emphasize the status of the monarchy and Spain's history, and the left-winged parties, who wanted to commemorate Spain's burgeoning democracy with an official holiday. While the manifest ties of Spain with Hispanic America are not questioned, the removal of the Hispanidad from the name of the national festivity aims to avoid any controversy regarding the conquest, influence and rule of the Americas by Spain during the imperial period.

The participation of the Armed Forces in the celebration of National Day was established in 1997 by Royal Decree, which regulates the commemoration and tribute acts to be performed by the Armed Forces on National Day of Spain. It actually transfers the most relevant acts of the Armed Forces Day, traditionally celebrated separately in springtime, to 12 October. This measure aimed, on the one hand, to integrate in the same festivity all the historic and cultural elements of the Spanish nation, and on the other hand, to enhance the identification of the Armed Forces with the Spanish society whom they serve. Other civic-military events are also organized around 12 October, including military training and exhibitions, cultural and sport events, aiming to facilitate the citizens to get a better knowledge of the Armed Forces.

== Celebrations ==
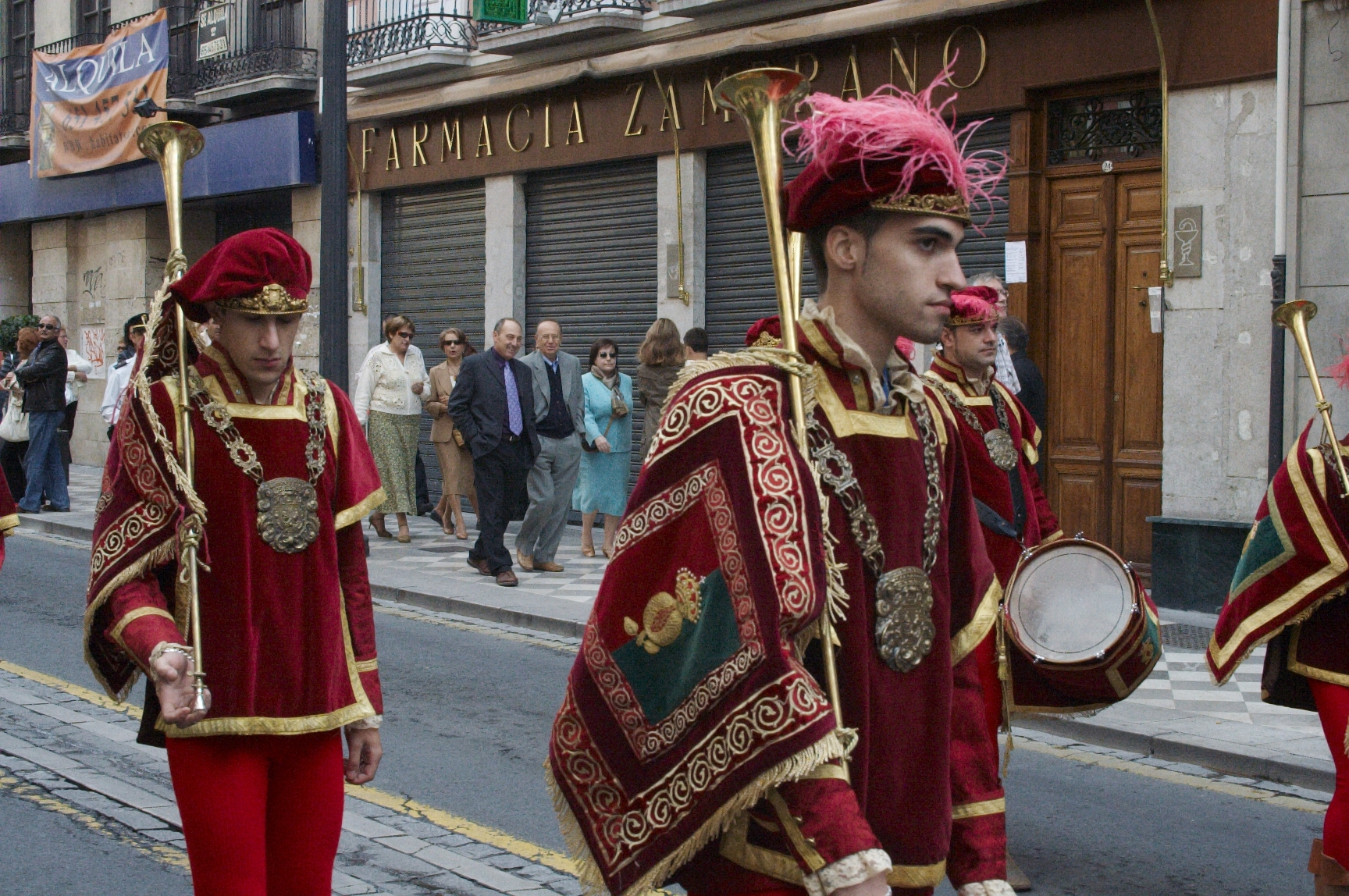
Parade celebrating Hispanic Day (12 October) in Granada, Spain.

Public and civil society celebrations of the National Day are numerous and of different natures. Solemn Acts of Tribute to the National Flag take place in different locations of Spain. The most important is the one traditionally held in the capital, Madrid, along with the Armed Forces and State Security Forces parade. Other tribute and vindicative parades and demonstrations are also organized by figures from civil society across Spain.

While the reference to 'Hispanidad' was removed from the official name of the festivity, the tradition of somehow celebrating this phenomenon is observed in Spain as it is celebrated by Hispanic peoples worldwide. Celebrations emphasizing the discovering of America and the pioneering efforts and contributions of Spain in America and to the world through centuries, from the world exploration to the Spanish influence and shaping of Hispanic American societies, are traditionally held.

Officially commemorated until 1987, Dia de la Hispanidad has continued to be spontaneously celebrated by Spanish people with both a cultural and a religious dimension. It celebrates Hispanic diversity, brotherhood, common heritage and cultural ties between Hispanic countries.

=== Tribute to the Flag and Armed Forces Parade ===
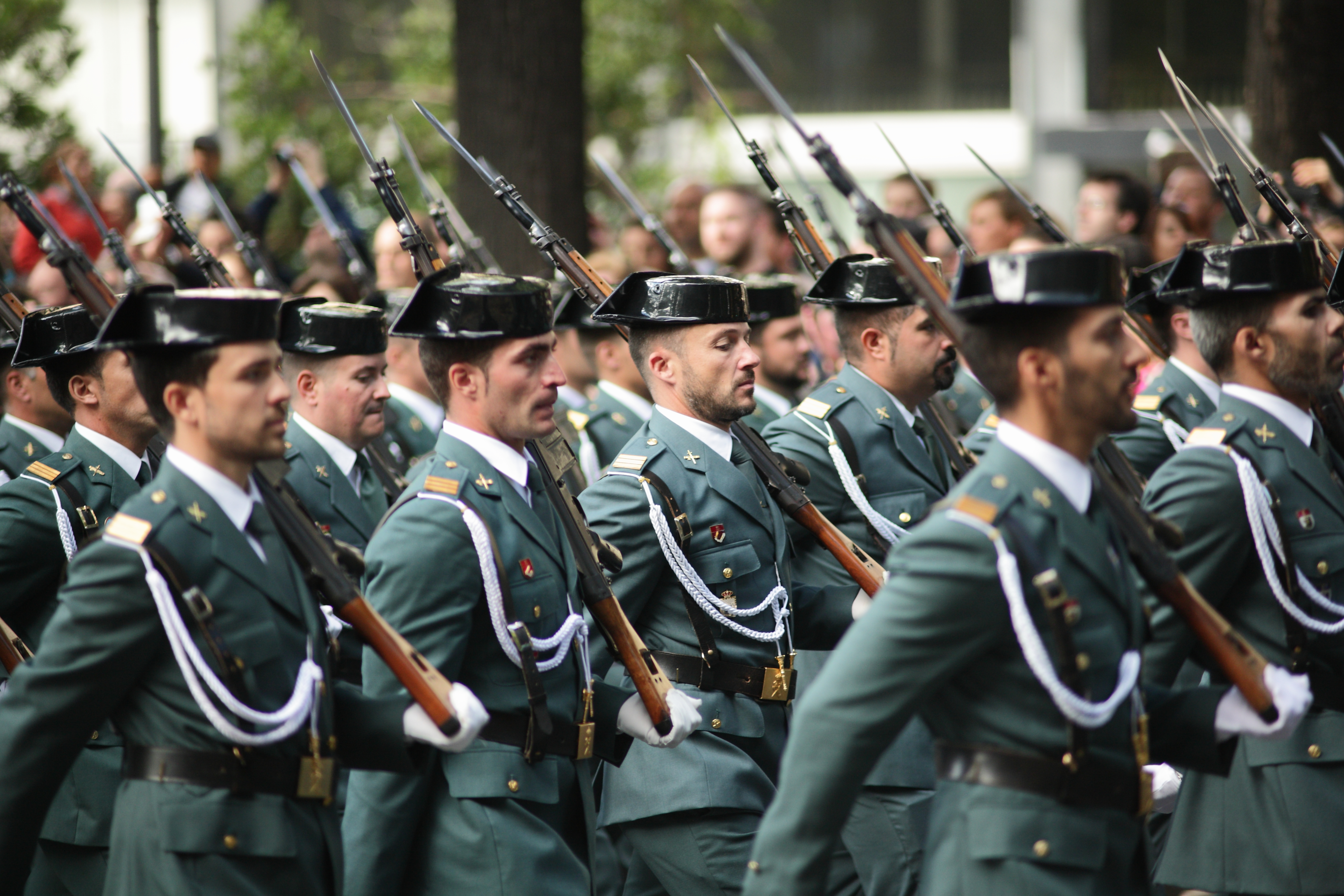
Military parade on 12 October in Madrid, featuring units from various service branches and security forces, including the Civil Guard.

The celebration traditionally includes a parade of the Spanish Armed Forces (military) and the national police forces, usually held in Madrid, attended by high institutional and political representatives including the Monarch, head of state and commander-in-chief of the Armed Forces, together with the Royal Family, the Prime Minister, the presidents of the Cortes Generales and faction leaders of its chambers, the President of the Constitutional Court, and the President of the Supreme Court and General Council of the Judiciary, members of the Council of Ministers, members of parliament, and other representatives of the central, regional and local governments. Political and institutional delegations from other guest countries, including military forces participating in the parade, also attend the event. The parade expresses the commitment of the Armed and the police forces to society and their contribution to the wider international community. The parade is held in one of the capital's big plazas, in recent parades the marching contingents are assigned the Paseo de la Castellana for the parade as a marching route.

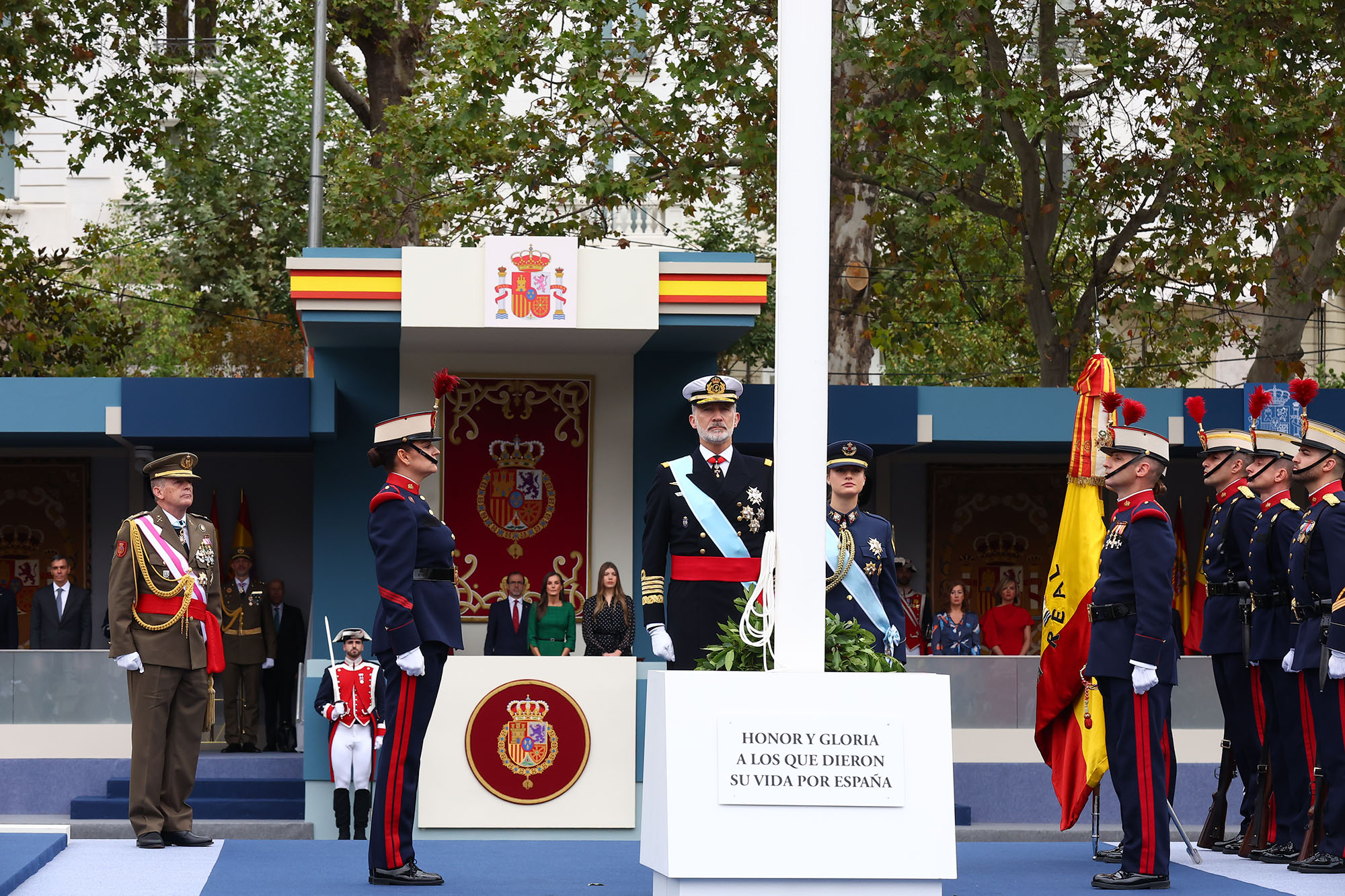
King Felipe VI and Leonor, Princess of Asturias, honoring the fallen for Spain.

The most important role is usually reserved for the Spanish flag. For several consecutive years, the Spanish Air Force aerobatics parachute demonstration unit has performed a jump carrying a massive Spanish flag to land in front of the Royal dais where the Monarch and they royal family, the Minister of Defense and the Chief of Defense Staff. Then the tribute to the national flag follows, with its raising while the national anthem, the "Marcha Real," is performed. Then, tribute is paid to the soldiers who gave their lives for Spain which is followed by a civil-military parade with mobile column and flypast segment, which usually includes a display by the Spanish Air and Space Force's aerobatics team, the Patrulla Águila.

The Armed Forces Parade is one of the most widely attended events in Spain, with thousands of citizens gathering along the parade route, where they can show their affection to the Royal Family, Armed Forces and to the State Security forces as they march past the dais.

As for many other public events, the 2020 Armed Forces Parade was cancelled due to the COVID-19 pandemic in the country and substituted by a civil-military institutional act in the Royal Palace's court where the Tribute to the Spanish flag could be paid followed by a short parade and a tribute to all actively fighting the pandemic.

The parade is broadcast by state-owned Televisión Española and is livestreamed online to millions around the world.

==== Expanded summary of the parade ====
At 9 am the Guardia Real's Honours Battalion forms up at the front of the royal dais where members of the Cabinet, deputies and senators of the Cortes, federal and regional government representatives, military attaches and veterans are assembled. Formed up with the regimental band of the Guard in companies, the guards of honour, in full dress with shakos and rifles, await the arrival of the King and Queen.

At 10 am, in the presence of the Prime Minister, Minister of Defense and Chief of Defense Staff, the Royal Family arrives. As the "Marcha Real" is played by the Guard Band, the guard battalion presents arms and a 21-gun salute is fired. As the music ends, the guard battalion orders arms. After this, the guard commander informs the King that the guard battalion has been formed for the ceremonial segment of the ceremony, and the King and Queen inspects the guard of honour battalion to music by the band. As the music stops, the royal party takes its leave of the guard and proceeds to the dais to meet other representatives of the federal government and regional leaders. As the party returns the Chief of Defense Staff takes his leave to ask for permission to begin the parade and ceremony before returning to the dais.

Following this the Parachute Team of the Air and Space Forces performs a freefall jump on to the parade grounds.

=== Spanish culture ===
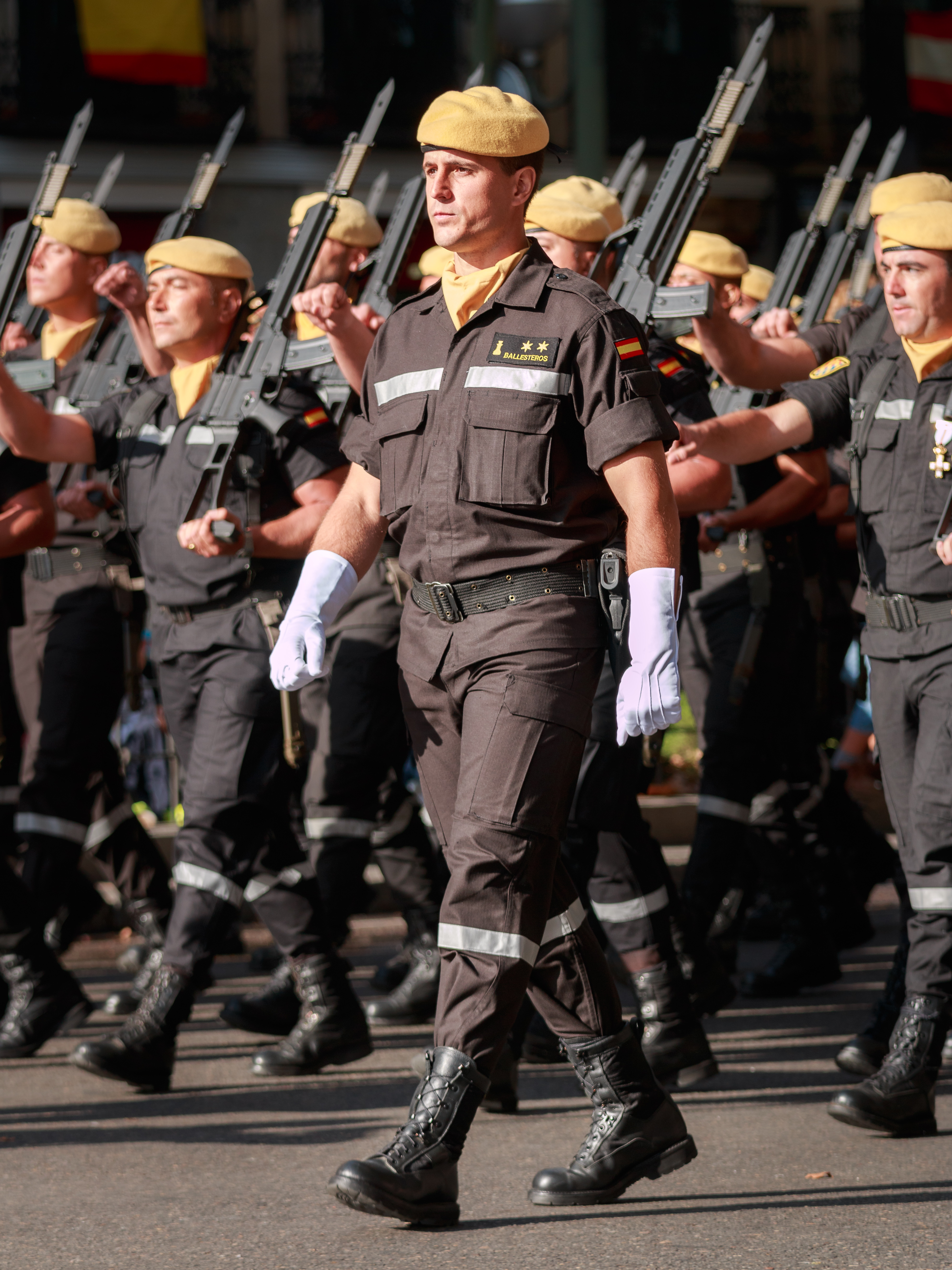
Military parade in Madrid on Spain's National Day.

An expression of the rich cultural diversity of Spain, National Day is celebrated through numerous public and private events to praise the nation's heritage, history, society and people. People dressed in traditional regional or historic costumes as well as folk, classical and modern music concerts and street shows are unavoidable features of the celebrations. Spanish American communities in Spain also participate in parades, displaying their national colors and their countries' typical garments marching along to the sound of their respective upbeat folk tunes.

12 October is an Open Doors Day in many museums and historical sites.

For some years since 2010, Spanish Language Day was also celebrated on 12 October by the United Nations, but was later moved to 23 April to commemorate the anniversary of Miguel de Cervantes' death on that day.

=== Religious dimension ===
The Spanish legacy has a strong religious component expressed with the traditional celebration of the Day of Our Lady of the Pillar, "Mother of the Hispanic Peoples" and very popular in Spain; and of the Our Lady of Guadalupe, "Queen of the Hispanidad" who enjoys a high popularity in Hispanic America, both festivities being held as well on 12 October.

Our Lady of the Pillar (la Virgen del Pilar) is patroness saint of both the autonomous community of Aragon and its capital, the city of Zaragoza as well as of the Guardia Civil (Spanish Civil Guard) and the Spanish Navy submarine force among others. It commemorates the coming of the Virgin Mary to Zaragoza in AD 40, according to tradition, her only apparition while she was still alive and the first to the Hispanic people. Since the religious feast day coincides with the discovery of the Americas (12 October 1492), Pope John Paul II praised El Pilar as "Mother of the Hispanic Peoples" during both his visits to the Cathedral-Basilica of Our Lady of the Pillar.

12 October, also popularly known in Spain as "Día del Pilar" (Day of the Pillar), attracts many people from other Spanish regions to Zaragoza, where the traditional "Ofrenda de flores a la Virgen" (Offering of flowers to the Virgin Mary), a massive parade with broad social participation, including from Hispanic American communities, takes place all day long. Every nation of Hispanic colonial origin has donated national vestments for the fifteenth-century statue of the Virgin, which is housed in the chapel of the cathedral.

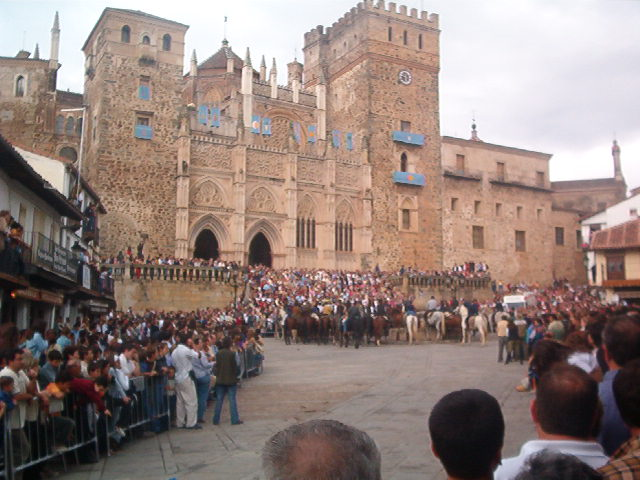
Celebration of Hispanic Day at the Basilica-Cathedral of Our Lady of Guadalupe in Extremadura, one of the 48 UNESCO World Heritage Sites in Spain.

Another relevant symbol of Hispanic heritage both in Spain and in Hispanic America is the cult of Our Lady of Guadalupe, which feast is celebrated in Extremadura on the Día de la Hispanidad, on 12 October each year, since she holds the title of Queen of Hispanicity since 1928. The origin of this religious tradition is the Christian legend of the apparition of the Blessed Mother to a shepherd in the 14th century indicating the place to find a wooden statue of the Virgin Mary carved by Luke the Evangelist buried centuries ago by local clergymen to prevent any damage of it from the Moorish invaders. The Monastery later built on the site where the statue was found soon became the most important place of pilgrimage in Castile and fair rich.

The Catholic Monarchs met in the Monastery with Columbus in June 1492, which resulted in the Monarchs' authorization of the exploration endeavor and the dispatch of the first Royal injunctions to organize the "voyage into the unknown." In 1493, Columbus went back to the Monastery to thank Our Lady of Guadalupe for his successful first voyage. On his second, he baptized a newly found Caribbean island as Guadalupe, in honor to the Spanish Virgin. This, together with the fact that many Spanish explorers came from Extremadura, and the utmost popularity of Our Lady of Guadalupe in Castile, are the reason behind the spread of the worship throughout America and her canonical coronation as Queen of Hispanicity.

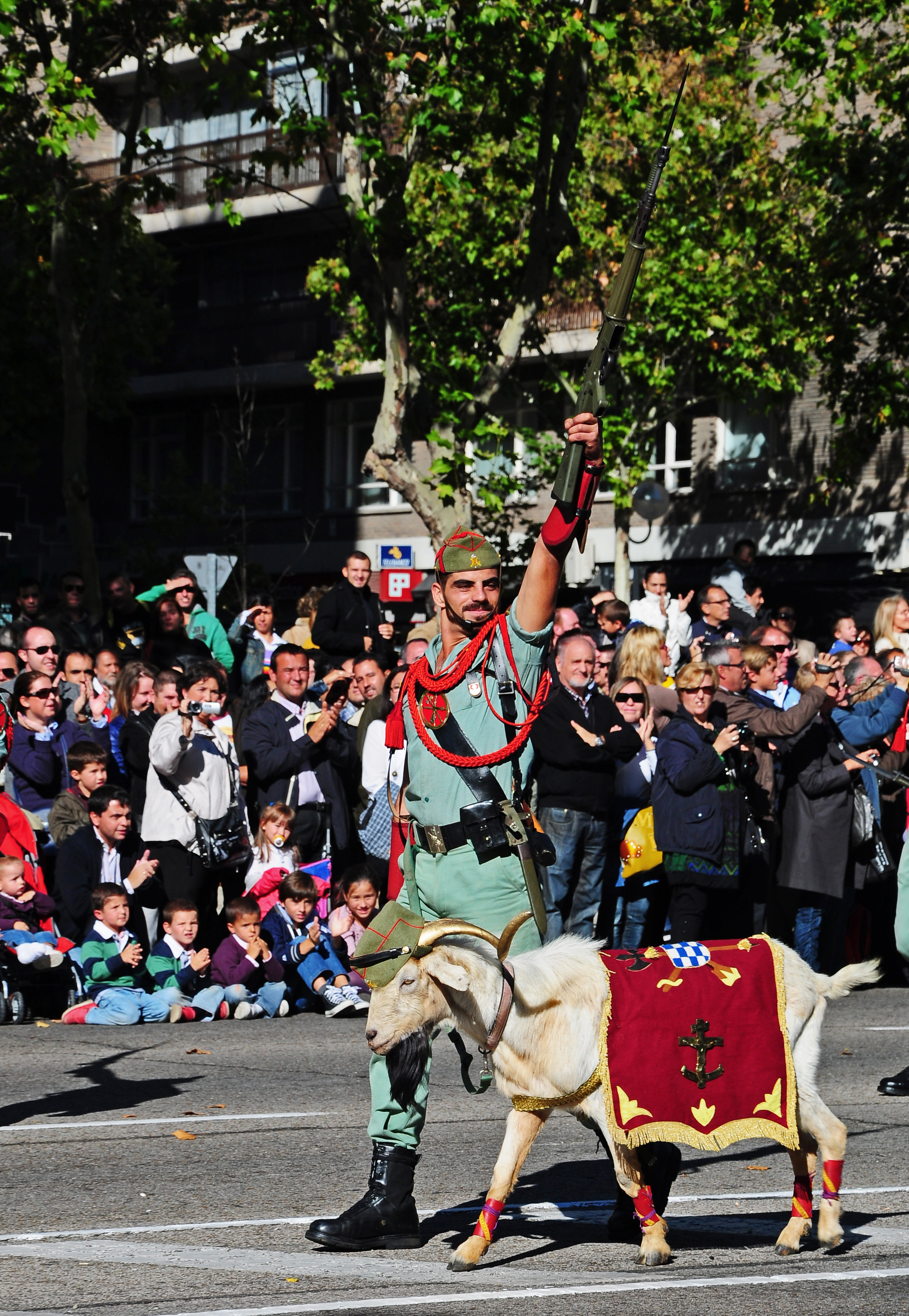
Armed Forces Parade in Madrid.

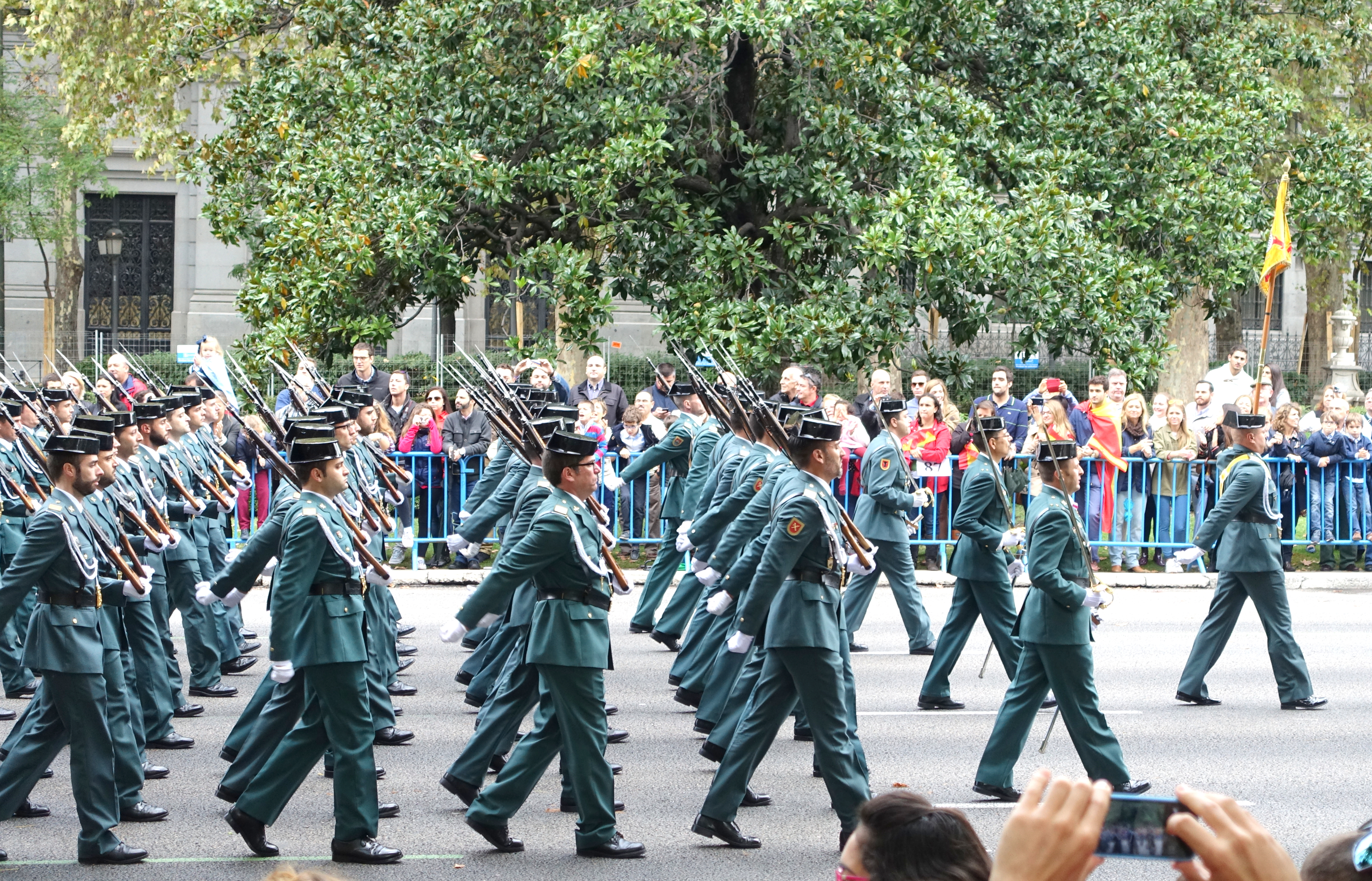
Fiesta Nacional de España 2014 – Madrid, Spain.

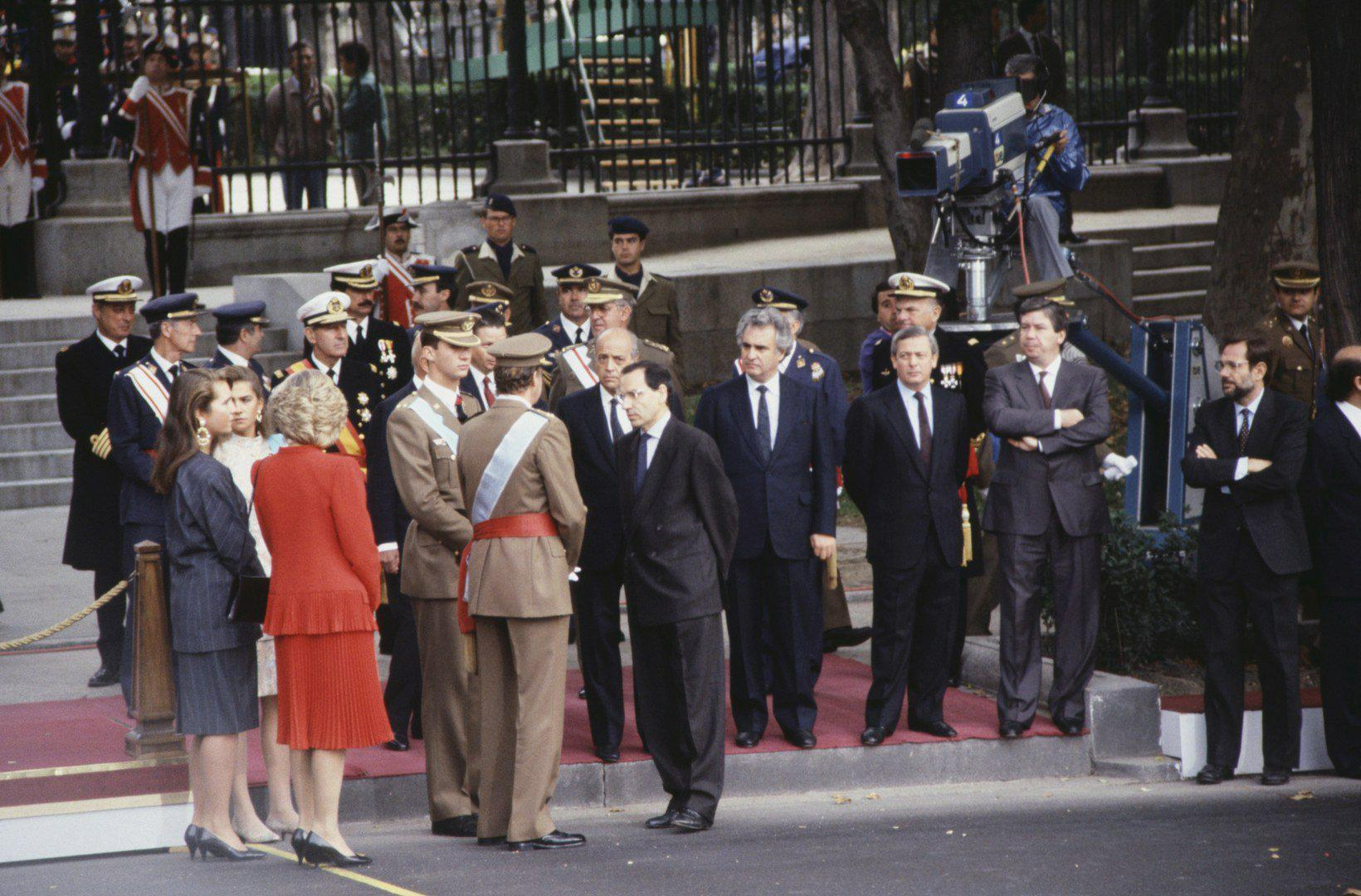
Dignitaries attending the military parade, 1988.

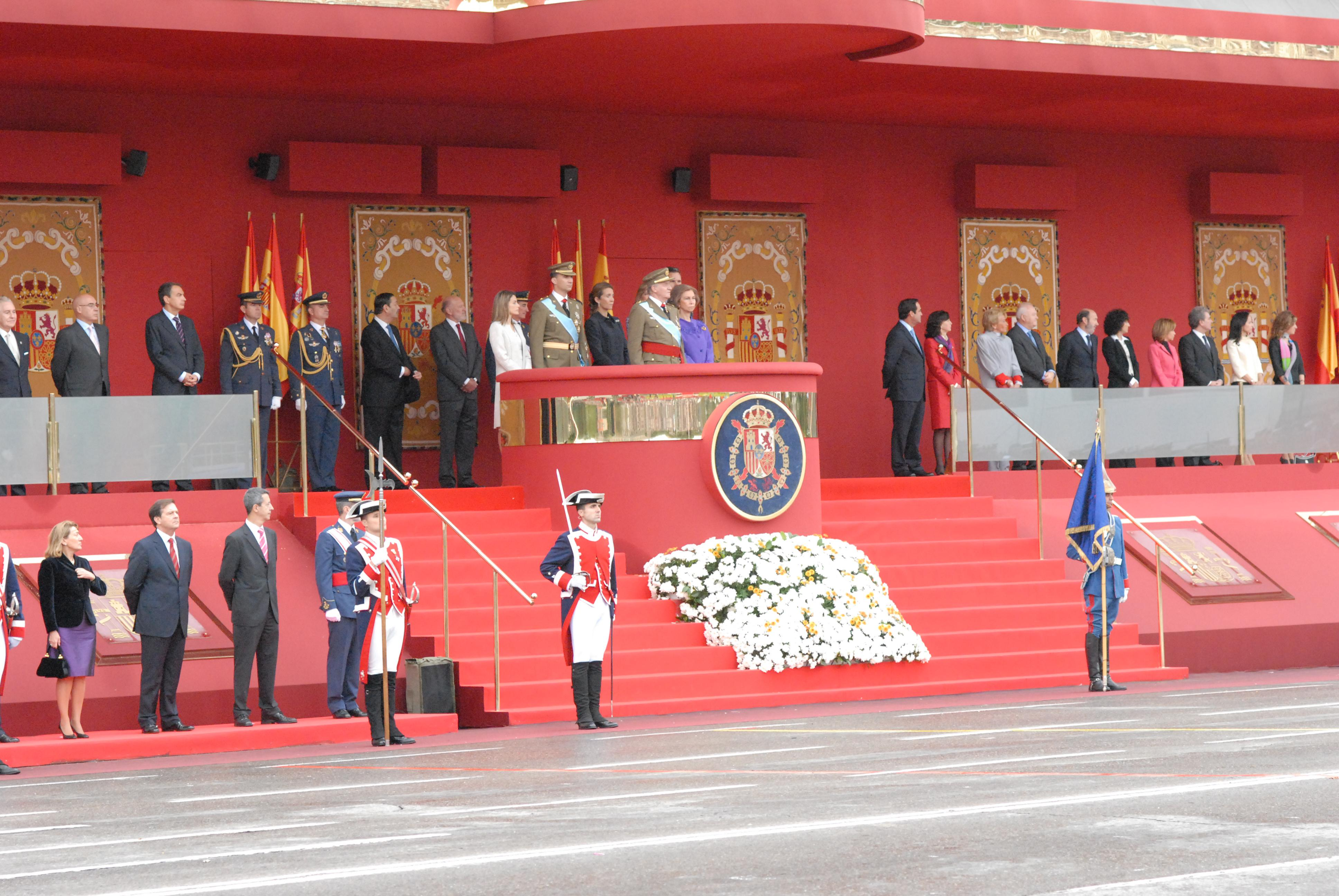
Stand of dignitaries in the military parade, 2008.

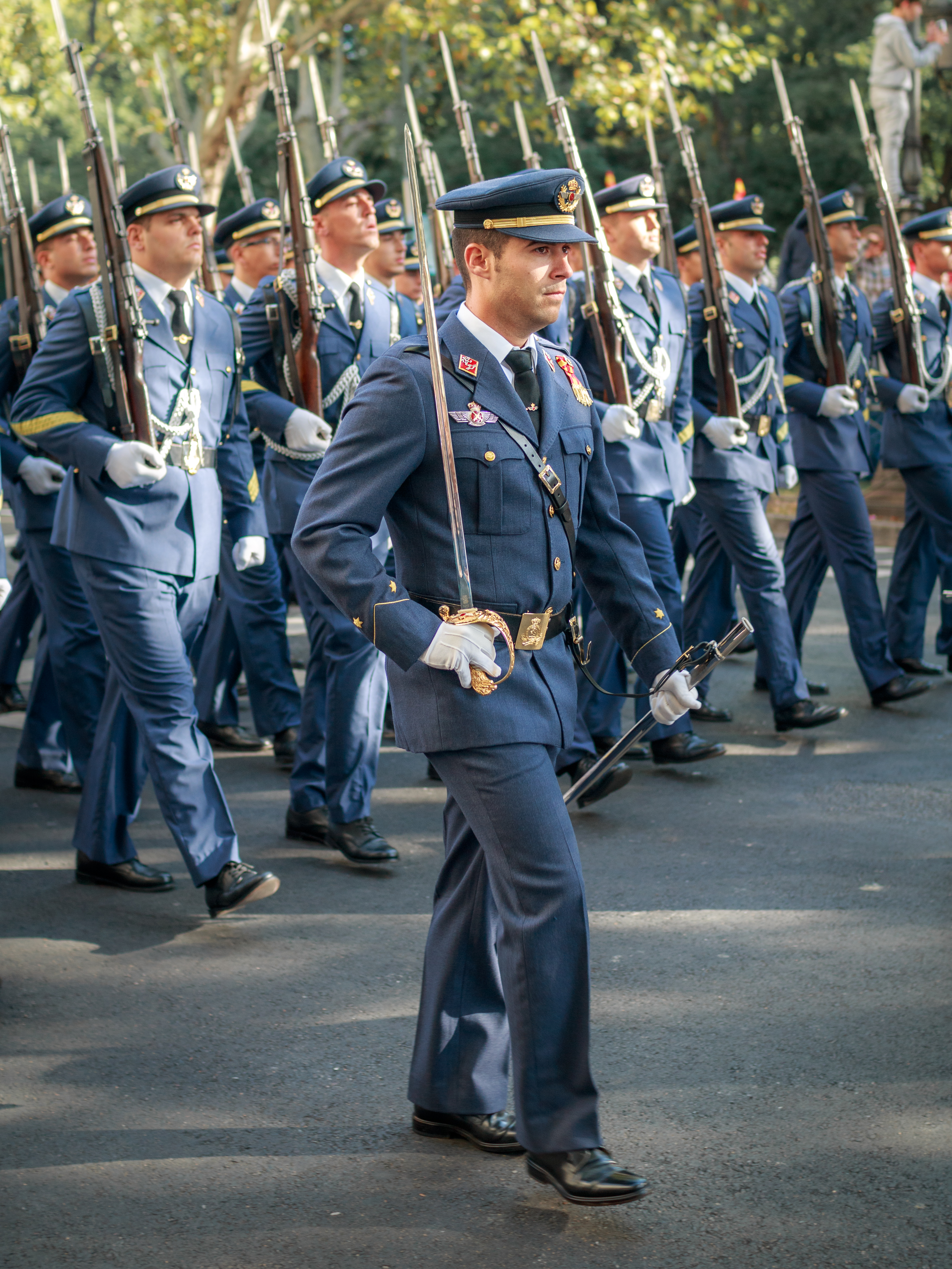
Air Force parade, 2013.

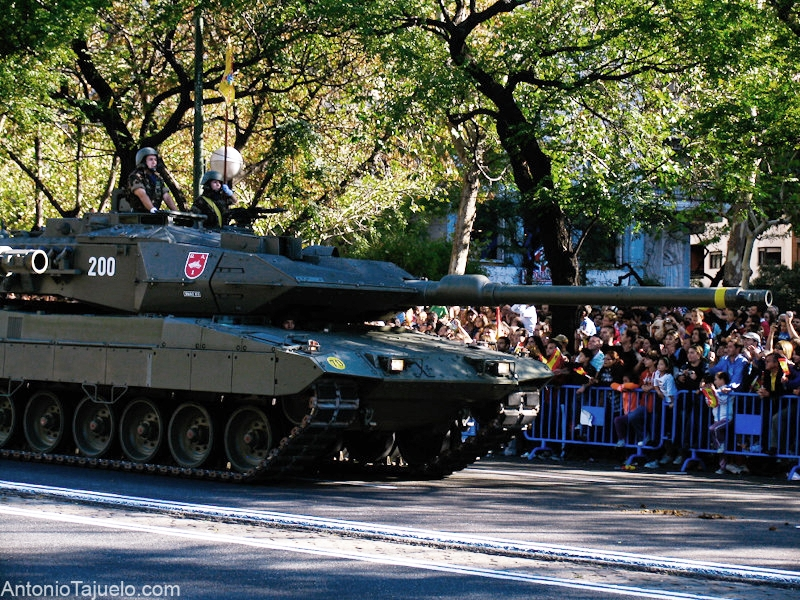
Army tank on parade in Madrid, 2009.

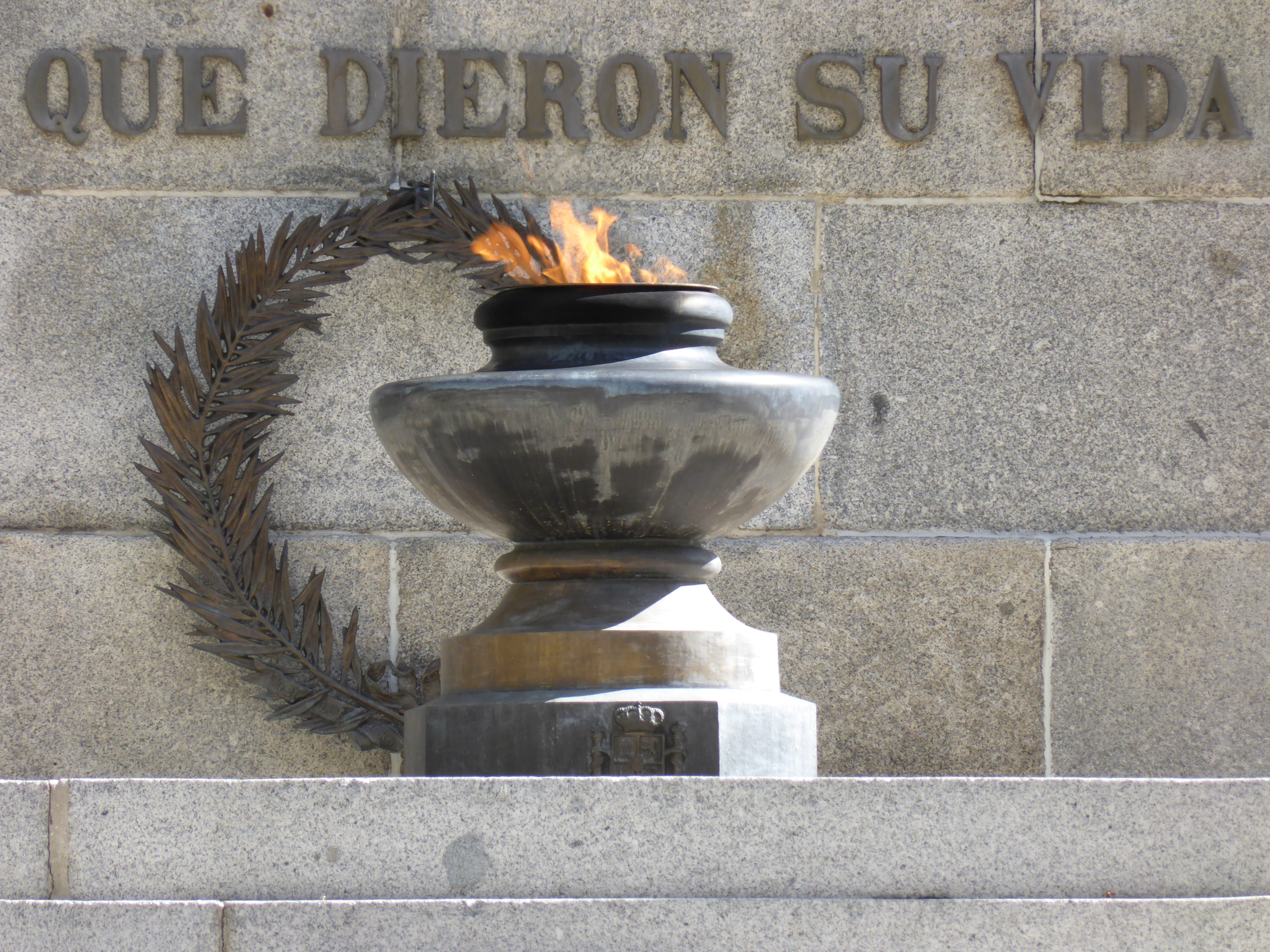
Eternal flame.

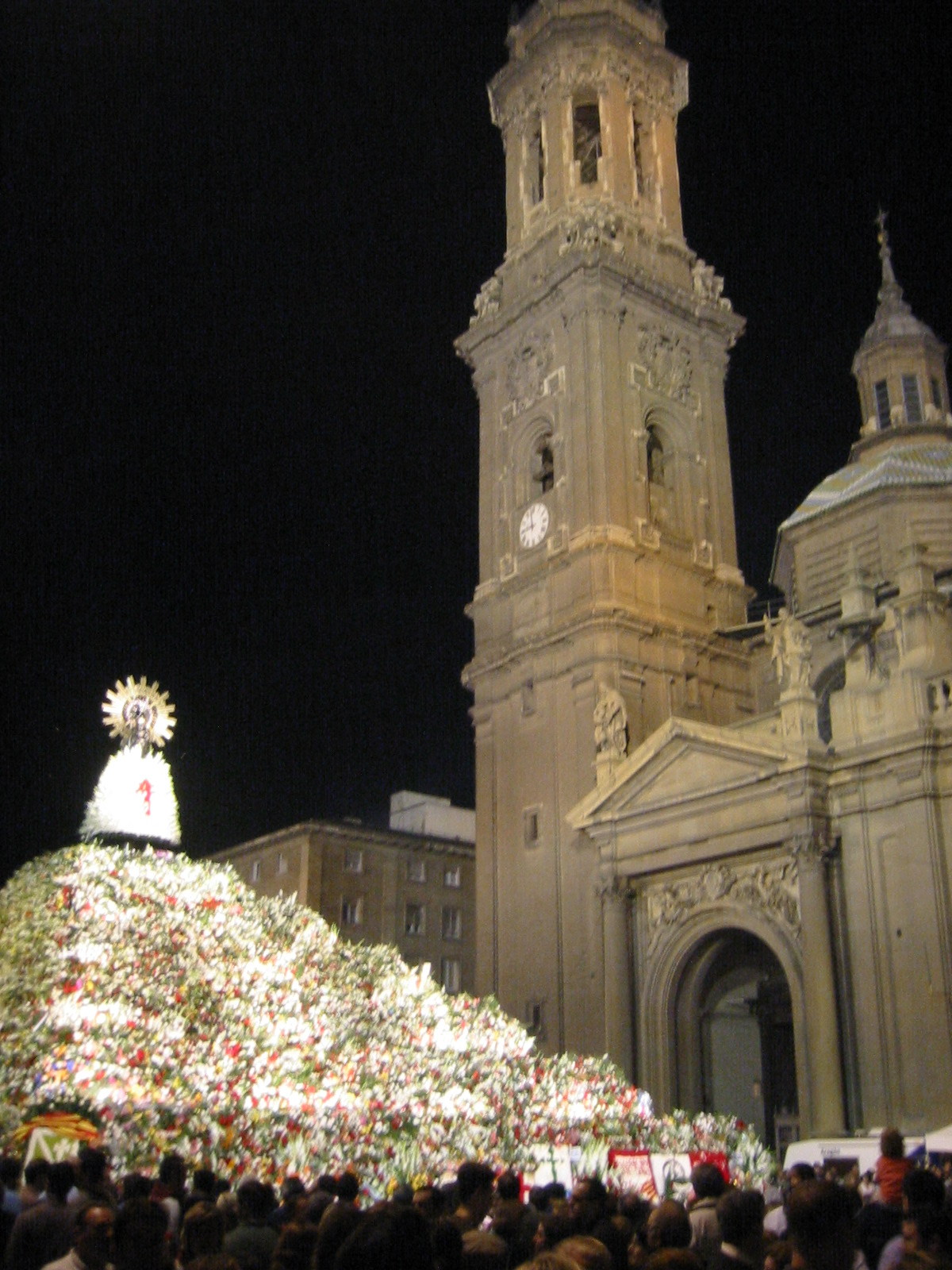
Offering of Flowers and Basilica del Pilar, Zaragoza.

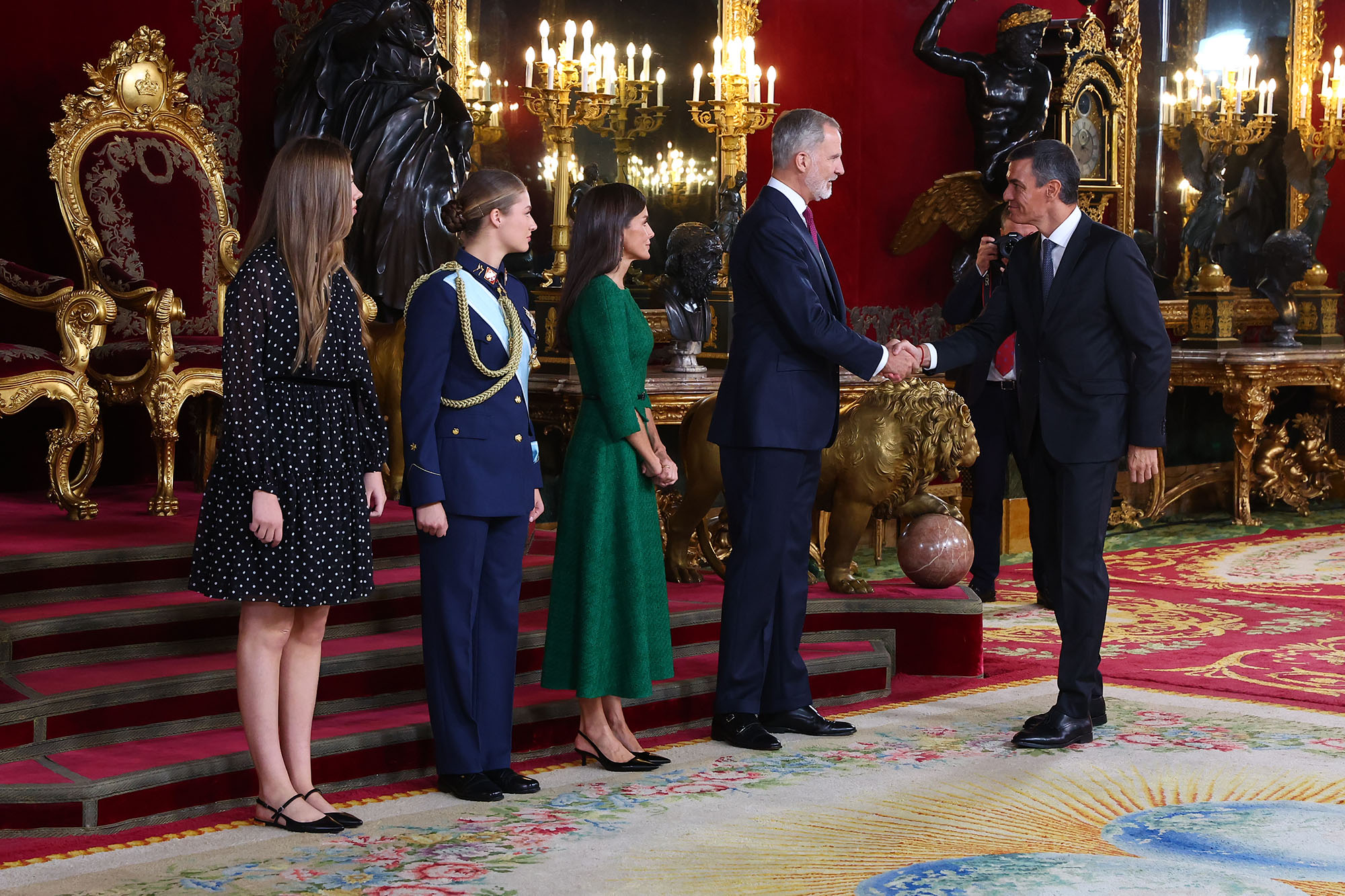
Traditional hand-kissing at the Throne Room.

== See also ==
- Hispanidad – The cultural and historical concept celebrated on Spain's National Day
- Columbus Day – The date (October 12) around which Spain's National Day is based
- Spanish Armed Forces – Honored during National Day military parades
- Culture of Spain – Central to the celebration and national identity
- Spanish language – A key part of Spanish identity spread through colonization
- Discovery of America – Historical event tied to the significance of October 12
- History of Spain – Provides context for the origins of the national day
- Spain – The nation being celebrated
- Spanish Cultural Heritage Institute – Preserves elements of culture tied to national pride
- Public holidays in Spain – Includes the National Day among others
- UN Spanish Language Day – Celebrates the Spanish language globally
- Hispanic America – Region historically linked to Spain through colonization
- Mestizo – Ethnic identity that emerged from Spanish colonization
- National Hispanic Heritage Month – U.S.-based celebration influenced by Hispanic culture
- Indigenous Resistance Day – A counter-commemoration in Latin America
- Timeline of support for Indigenous Peoples' Day – U.S.-centric perspective opposing Columbus Day
- Native American Day – U.S. holiday focusing on indigenous rights and history
