= Frater =

Frater is the Latin word for brother.

- In Roman Catholicism, a monk who is not a priest

Frater may also refer to:

== People ==
=== Surname ===
- Alexander Frater (1937–2020), New Hebrides travel writer and journalist
- Anne Frater, Scottish poet from Bayble, Outer Hebrides
- Benjamin Frater (1979–2007), Australian poet
- George Frater, Scottish rugby player active 1896–1905
- György Fráter (1482–1551), Croatian nobleman and monk
- Kevaughn Frater (born 1994), Jamaican footballer
- Lindel Frater (born 1977), Jamaican sprinter
- Lóránd Fráter, (1872-1930), Hungarian composer
- Marion Frater, New Zealand judge
- Michael Frater (born 1982), Jamaican sprinter
- Rhiannon Frater, American author
- Robert Frater (cricketer) (1902–1968), New Zealand cricketer
- Robert Frater (fencer) (born 1887), British Olympic fencer
- Tony Van Frater (died 2015), guitarist for British band Red Alert
- Viktoria Frater, Hungarian gymnast

=== Title ===
- Frater Achad (Charles Stansfeld Jones; 1886–1950), English occultist
- Frater Albertus (1911–1984), American alchemist and teacher
- Frater Eratus (Karl Spiesberger; 1904–1992), German mystic and occultist
- Frater Perdurabo (Aleister Crowley; 1875–1947), English occultist
- Frater Progradior (Frank Bennett (occultist); 1868–1930), Australian occultist
- Frater Saturnus (Karl Germer; 1885–1962), German occultist
- Frater U.: D.: (Ralph Tegtmeier; born 1952), German occultist

== Other ==
- Frater House, a house where fraternity or sorority members live and work together
- Frater, Ontario, a community in the Unorganized North Algoma District, Ontario, Canada
- Refectory, sometimes called a frater, a dining hall in a monastery or boarding school
- The Frater, publication of Psi Omega, an American fraternity of dentists
- Frater Superior, the head of Ordo Templi Orientis, an international fraternal and religious organization
- Frater (lingua sistemfrater), a constructed language
- Frater 1986-1994 Hard Rock Band out of Los Angeles CA.

== See also ==
- Frater Arvale, a body of priests in ancient Roman religion
- Frater Polonorum or Polish Brethren, members of the Minor Reformed Church of Poland, 1565–1658.
- Frater Rosae Crucis, a title in the Rosicrucian organization Ancient Mystical Order Rosæ Crucis
- Fráter–Seebach alkylation, an organic chemical reaction
- Fraternal (disambiguation)
- Brother (disambiguation)
