= Gazzarri's =

Nightclub in West Hollywood, California, United States

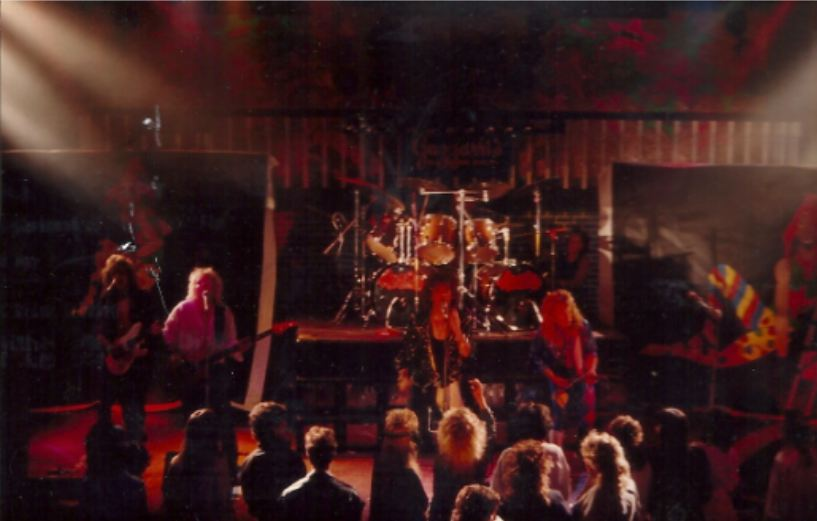
- Gazzarri's nightclub, 1986
- Address: 9039 Sunset Boulevard
- Location: West Hollywood, California 90069
- Owner: Bill Gazzarri
- Seating type: downstairs: Standing room only upstairs: balcony seating
- Type: Nightclub
- Event: Rock and roll

Construction
- Opened: June 1, 1965
- Closed: 1993
- Demolished: 1995

Gazzarri's (also known as Gazzarri's Hollywood a Go Go) was a nightclub on the Sunset Strip in West Hollywood, California. The venue was a staple of the Los Angeles music scene from the 1960s until the early 1990s. The Doors and Van Halen were featured house bands there before being signed to major record labels. Another prominent local band, L.A. Rocks, was also the house band there in the early 1980s. It was the backdrop for Huey Lewis and the News' short form promotional music video for their 1984 hit "The Heart of Rock and Roll".

== History ==
Gazzarri's Hollywood a Go Go opened with performances by the Sinners, who became the house band, the Vendells and the Gazzarri dancers on June 1, 1965. The nightclub's early history is closely associated with the Los Angeles-based television show Hollywood a Go Go, which would feature the Sinners and the Gazzarri dancers.

In 1965, KHJ disc jockey Roger Christian made weekly appearances at Gazzarri's Hollywood a Go Go. Performers at the nightclub in 1965 and 1966 include the Turtles, Billy Peek, Ike & Tina Turner, and Pat & Lolly Vegas. The nightclub also featured actor Edward James Olmos, with his band Eddie James and the Pacific Ocean as the house band in 1966.

Gazzarri's reached its peak of popularity in the late 1960s, featuring Jim Morrison's young new group, along with other talent such as ? and the Mysterians, The Bobby Fuller Four, Buffalo Springfield and The Walker Brothers. It then achieved major L.A. relevance again in the late 1970s, featuring the David Lee Roth-led Van Halen nightly for months on end, and then into the 1980s through the early 1990s as one of the top L.A. glam metal nightclubs. It was owned and operated by Bill Gazzarri, who was known for dressing up as a Chicago-style gangster and frequenting the club on performance nights.

Located near the corner of Doheny and Sunset Boulevard in West Hollywood, and just several dozen yards from both the Rainbow Bar and Grill and The Roxy Theatre, Gazzarri's became famous as a launching pad for future rock and roll stars. Along with the Roxy Theatre, the Whisky a Go Go, the Troubadour, the Starwood and other nearby nightclubs, Gazzarri's was a staple of the Los Angeles music scene. Some other bands that played at Gazzarri's either prior to or during their mainstream success include Johnny Rivers, Van Halen, ? and the Mysterians, NEWHAVEN, SouthGang, Sonny and Cher, Ratt, Cinderella, Chicano rock band Renegade, Victor Flamingo, Quiet Riot, Stryper, Mötley Crüe, Poison, Guns N' Roses, Warrant, and Faster Pussycat. Other notable local Los Angeles area bands to play there included Redd Kross, Brunette, Shark Island, Frater, The Pastels, Nightwatch and Hurricane (band). Some of the bands to play Gazzarri's were featured in The Decline of Western Civilization Part II: The Metal Years, such as Salute, Shocktop and Broken Cherry. Many giant hand-painted pictures of these bands adorned the side of the club's outside wall for many years. Actress-singer Mamie Van Doren even did her 1985 comeback show there.

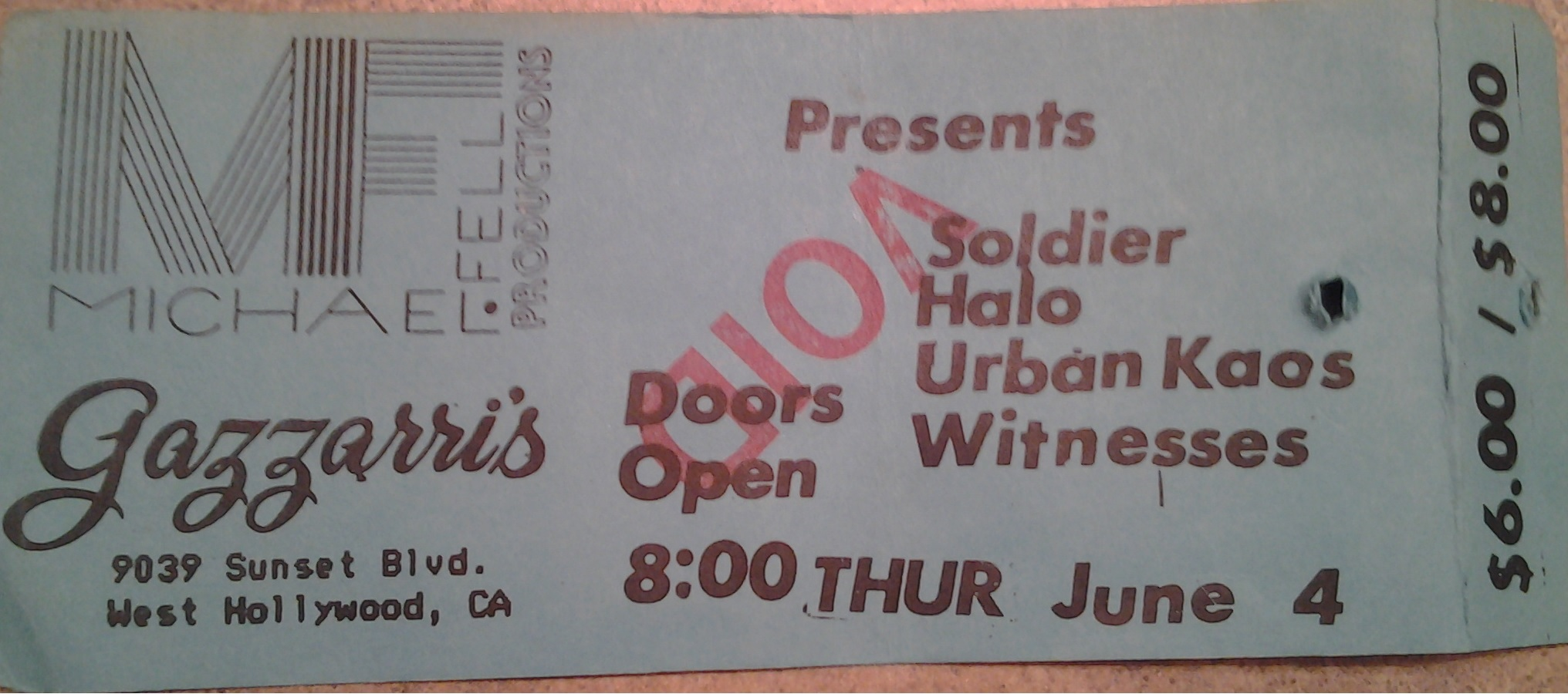
late 80's ticket for Gazzari's show featuring the bands.....Soldier, Halo, Urban Kaos, Witnesses

The 90-yard stretch of sidewalk on Sunset Boulevard that runs from the front steps of Gazzarri's (now 1 Oak, 9039 West Sunset Blvd.) to the parking lot between the Rainbow Bar and Grill (9015 West Sunset Blvd.) and the Roxy Theatre (9009 West Sunset Blvd.) was the national center of the 1980s glam metal movement that spawned dozens of MTV bands and radio hits. Aspiring bands and musicians from around the world, coming to Los Angeles to make it big, eventually found themselves on this street passing out their flyers, watching the competition in the clubs or enjoying the scene packed with thousands of other musicians, famous rock stars, porn stars, groupies and Los Angeles teenagers.

The nightclub also moonlighted variously over the years a stage-dance venue, and Gazzarri's would often feature the strip-club style dancing of attractive, young girls between live band performances. The "Miss Gazzarri's Dancers" included future Playboy Playmate and Hugh Hefner girlfriend Barbi Benton as well as future television star Catherine Bach. The club became a favorite hangout for teen dancers who loved live music, which was not lost on the neighboring television studios. Gazzarri's was acknowledged by TV executives as the real-life inspiration for music-based TV shows such as Don Kirshner's Rock Concert, The Monkees and The Partridge Family.

Gazzarri's was also featured in the 1974 pilot of The Rockford Files and was the location for the Crazy Horse West strip club in the 1976 film The Killing of a Chinese Bookie and the 1987 MGM film Number One With A Bullet.

== Pay-to-play ==
The club was part of the controversial "pay-to-play" concept in the 1980s, along with other major Hollywood nightclubs that showcased bands with original songs. As many as four bands per night would each buy 100 to 200 tickets from the club at around $5, handing over in advance hundreds of dollars for a 45-minute slot. Soon, many bands were spending as much time promoting, handing out flyers, advertising in local magazines and building mailing lists as they were on songwriting, practicing and actually gigging live. Guns 'N Roses lead singer Axl Rose has stated several times in interviews that the "L.A. scene was so competitive, if half the bands in the Top 40 right now had tried to get their big break in L.A. instead of somewhere else, they never would have made it."

== After ==
Bill Gazzarri died in 1991 and the club closed down in 1993. In 1994, the building suffered irreparable damage from the Northridge earthquake. It was torn down in 1995 and a new club called Billboard Live opened at the site in 1996. Billboard Live became The Key Club in 1998. The Key Club held its final show on March 14, 2013 and was replaced by the nightclub 1 Oak later that year. 1 Oak operated until 2022 when new owners announced a new yet-to-be-named club was under development, with an expected opening date of spring 2024. The club finally opened in August 2024 under the name Keys.

== Live at the Key Club ==
- Phil Seymour In Concert! (1980, released 2014), Phil Seymour
- Live at the Key Club (Cinderella album) (1998), Cinderella
- The Sting: Live at the Key Club L.A. (2000), W.A.S.P. (band)
- Live @ the Key Club (2000), Pennywise

== In popular culture ==
The end credits of the 1980 slasher film New Year's Evil give "Special Thanks to Bill 'Godfather of Rock and Roll' Gazzarri."

It appears in episode 2, season 1 of the Rockford Files.

The club also appears in the opening scene of Episode 18, Season 2 of Barnaby Jones titled "A Gold Record for Murder".
