= Indigenous Peoples' Day (United States) =

Day honoring Indigenous Peoples of the Americas

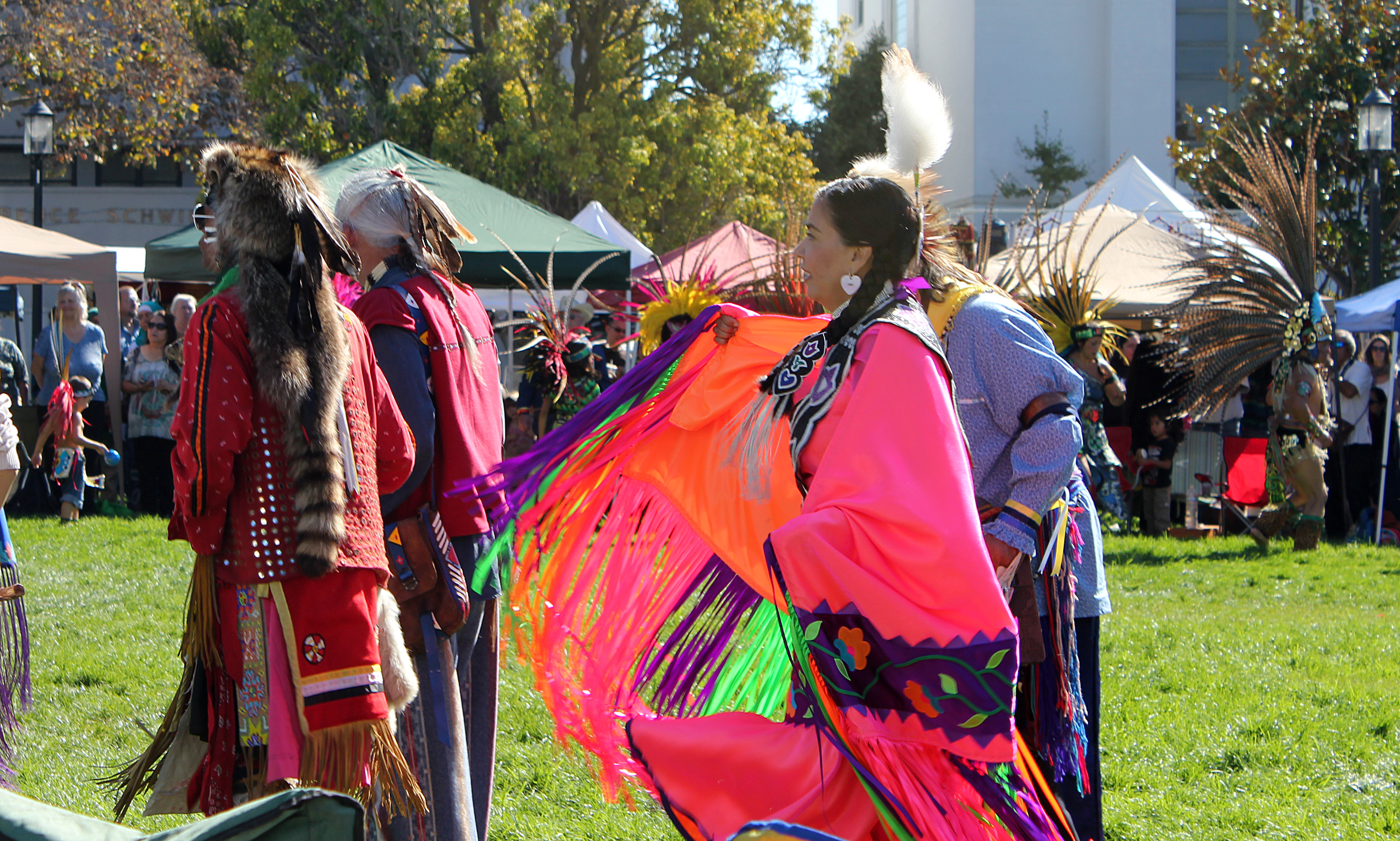
- Celebration in Berkeley, California, 2012
- Also called: First People's Day or Native American Day
- Observed by: Various states and municipalities in the Americas on the second Monday in October, in lieu of Columbus Day
- Type: Ethnic
- Significance: A day in honor of Native Indigenous Americans in opposition to the celebration of Columbus Day.
- Date: Varies
- 2025 date: October 13, 2025
- 2026 date: October 12, 2026
- 2027 date: October 11, 2027
- Frequency: Annual
- First time: October 11, 1992
- Related to: National Indigenous Peoples Day in Canada

Indigenous Peoples' Day (Note: Sometimes unpunctuated Indigenous "Peoples" or incorrectly punctuated "People's" Day) is an official city and state holiday in various localities in the United States that celebrates and honors Indigenous American people (Native Americans) and commemorates their histories and cultures. It is celebrated on the second Monday in October. It began as a counter-celebration held on the same day as the U.S. federal holiday of Columbus Day, which honors Italian explorer Christopher Columbus. It is celebrated as an alternative to Columbus Day due to the lasting harm Indigenous tribes suffered because of Columbus's contributions to the European colonization of the Americas.

The roots of the holiday can be traced back to discussions and propositions regarding instituting it as a replacement for Columbus Day that took place in 1977 during The International NGO Conference on Discrimination Against Indigenous Populations in the Americas in Geneva, Switzerland. In 2021, Joe Biden formally commemorated the holiday with a presidential proclamation, becoming the first U.S. president to do so, and presidential proclamations have also been issued in 2022, 2023, and 2024.

== History ==
In 1977, the International World Conference on Discrimination Against Indigenous Populations in the Americas, sponsored by the United Nations in Geneva, Switzerland, began to discuss replacing Columbus Day in the Americas with a celebration to be known as Indigenous Peoples Day. Similarly, Native American groups staged a sort of protest in Boston instead of Thanksgiving, which has been celebrated there to mark collaboration between Massachusetts colonists and Native Americans. In July 1990, at the First Continental Conference on 500 Years of Indian Resistance in Quito, Ecuador, representatives of Indigenous peoples throughout the Americas agreed that they would mark 1992, the 500th anniversary of the first of the voyages of Christopher Columbus, as a year to promote "continental unity" and "liberation".

After the conference, attendees from Northern California organized protests against the "Quincentennial Jubilee" that had been organized by the United States Congress for the San Francisco Bay Area on Columbus Day in 1992. It was to include replicas of Columbus's ships sailing under the Golden Gate Bridge and reenacting their "discovery" of America. The delegates formed the Bay Area Indian Alliance and in turn, the "Resistance 500" task force. It promoted the idea that Columbus's "discovery" of inhabited lands and the subsequent European colonization of them had resulted in the genocide of thousands of Indigenous peoples because of the decisions which were made by colonial and national governments.

In 1992, the group convinced the city council of Berkeley, California, to declare October 12 as a "Day of Solidarity with Indigenous People" and 1992 as the "Year of Indigenous People." The city implemented related programs in schools, libraries, and museums. The city symbolically renamed Columbus Day as "Indigenous Peoples Day" beginning in 1992 to protest the historical conquest of North America by Europeans, and to call attention to the losses suffered by the Native American peoples and their cultures through diseases, warfare, massacres, and forced assimilation. Get Lost (Again) Columbus, an opera by a Native American composer, White Cloud Wolfhawk, was produced that day. Berkeley has celebrated Indigenous Peoples Day ever since. Beginning in 1993, Berkeley has also held an annual powwow and festival on Indigenous Peoples Day. In the years following Berkeley's action, other local governments and institutions have either renamed or canceled Columbus Day, either to celebrate Native American history and cultures, to avoid celebrating Columbus and the European colonization of the Americas, or due to raised controversy over the legacy of Columbus. Several other California cities, including Richmond, Santa Cruz, and Sebastopol, now celebrate Indigenous Peoples Day and encourage people to donate to a neighboring tribe and recognize the trauma and pain Indigenous peoples have been subjected to by colonizers. This shift from Columbus Day to Indigenous Peoples Day can also be seen more recently. For example, the City of Newton, Massachusetts voted to change the name of the holiday in 2020. Since then, Indigenous residents of Newton have banded together to host an annual Indigenous Peoples Day Ceremonial Celebration to commemorate the day.

At least 14 states do not celebrate Columbus Day (Alaska, Hawaii, Iowa, Louisiana, Maine, Michigan, Minnesota, New Mexico, Oregon, South Dakota, Vermont, Washington, Wisconsin), as well as Washington, DC; South Dakota officially celebrates Native American Day instead. Various tribal governments in Oklahoma designate the day as "Native American Day", or have renamed the day after their own tribes. In 2013, the California state legislature considered a bill, AB55, to formally replace Columbus Day with Native American Day but did not pass it. While the California governor has recognized Indigenous Peoples Day, the holiday was eliminated by Governor Arnold Schwarzenegger in the 2008-12 California budget crisis. On August 30, 2017, following similar affirmative votes in Oberlin, Ohio, followed later by Bangor, Maine, in the earlier weeks of the same month, the Los Angeles City Council voted in favor of replacing Columbus Day with Indigenous Peoples Day. On October 10, 2019, just a few days before Columbus Day would be celebrated in Washington, D.C., the D.C. Council voted to temporarily replace Columbus Day with Indigenous Peoples Day. This bill was led by Councilmember David Grosso (I-At Large) and must undergo congressional approval to become permanent. Washington D.C., as of May 2023, has yet to have given the permanent legislation to this renaming.

Although it is not a federal holiday under US law, the Biden Administration has formally recognized Indigenous Peoples Day. The first White House proclamation on the holiday was released in 2021, written with input from Indigenous activists.

== Other celebrations ==
Numerous efforts in North America have honored Native American people as part of Columbus Day, or by designating two holidays for the same date. Especially since Native American activism has increased since the 1960s and 1970s, a variety of protests have been staged against celebrating Columbus Day. These have included mock trials of Christopher Columbus in St. Paul, Minnesota, and protests and disruptions of Columbus Day parades in the United States.

Indigenous peoples in other nations have also lobbied to have holidays established to recognize their contributions and history. In South America, for instance, Brazil celebrates "National Indigenous Peoples Day" on April 19.

In Asia, Taiwan designated August 1 as Indigenous Peoples Day in 2016 under the administration of President Tsai Ing-wen, who announced that the government is committed to promoting the rights of Taiwan's Indigenous peoples and enhancing public awareness of their culture and history. In the Philippines, the National Commission on Indigenous Peoples, as well as various local Indigenous towns, designated October 29, 1987, as Indigenous Peoples Day.

=== Native American Day ===
Some states celebrate a separate but similar Native American Day; however, this is observed not on Columbus Day but in September. Those who observe include the states of California and Tennessee. However, as of 2021, the State of California does not actually observe this holiday by closing its government offices, giving its employees paid time off, or encouraging private businesses to do the same in observance. In Washington state it is celebrated the Friday immediately following the fourth Thursday in November.

=== International Day of the World's Indigenous People ===
In 2003, the United Nations declared an International Day of the World's Indigenous People, establishing it on August 9. This international holiday has been celebrated also in various nations.

== Observance by jurisdiction ==
The following U.S. states and federal district have established Indigenous Peoples' Day as a state holiday on the second Monday in October.

- Alabama (Called American Indian Heritage Day and co-celebrated with Columbus Day and Fraternal Day)
- Maine
- Minnesota
- Montana (Co-celebrated with Columbus Day)
- Nebraska (Co-celebrated with Columbus Day)
- New Mexico
- Puerto Rico (The Discovery of America Day)
- Rhode Island (Co-celebrated with Columbus Day)
- South Dakota (Called Native Americans' Day)
- Vermont
- Washington, D.C.

Additionally, the following states have a holiday celebrating Native Americans on some other day or have recognized Indigenous Peoples' Day but not as an official holiday.

- Alaska
- California (September 22)
- Hawaii (Discoverers' Day, observed on Columbus Day)
- Maryland (American Indian Heritage Day, observed the Friday after Thanksgiving in November)
- North Dakota (First Nations Day, typically designated on the Friday before Columbus Day)
- Oklahoma (Governor is required to issue a proclamation for a day celebrating each of the 39 Native American tribes of Oklahoma, on a date of the tribe's choosing)
- Oregon observes Indigenous Peoples’ Day instead of Columbus Day since 2021.
- Texas observes Columbus Day, but also Indigenous Peoples' Week starting on Columbus Day.
- Washington (Native American Heritage Day, held the day after Thanksgiving)
- Wisconsin

In February 2025, Google announced that Indigenous Peoples' Month would no longer be highlighted by default on Google Calendar, arguing that it was no longer "scalable or sustainable" to continue adding the growing number of national and international "cultural moments" manually to its calendars.

== Criticism and controversy ==
Indigenous Peoples' Day has been criticized by some American conservative communities and public figures. In 2020, President Donald Trump criticized Indigenous Peoples' Day at a campaign rally in Michigan, calling it an example of how "the radical left is eradicating our history". In 2022, the Washington Examiner published a column calling for the holiday's end, saying that Indigenous peoples attacked and conquered each other's land.

Decisions by some states and municipalities to change Columbus Day to Indigenous People's Day have also been claimed by some commentators to be an attack on Italian Americans and their history, including anti-Italian discrimination. In California, the Italian Cultural Society of Sacramento proclaimed that, "Indigenous Peoples Day is viewed by Italian Americans and other Americans as anti-Columbus Day." Other Italian-American groups, such as Italian Americans for Indigenous Peoples Day, have welcomed the change and asserted that it is not anti-Italian. The Second Trump Administration did not issue a statement recognizing Indigenous People's day, and instead criticized "left-wing radicals" for allegedly tarnishing Columbus's reputation.

== See also ==
- Columbus Day
- Indigenous Peoples Day (Brazil)
- Italian Americans for Indigenous Peoples Day
- National American Indian Heritage Month
- National Indigenous Peoples Day (Canada)
- Native American Day
- Timeline of support for Indigenous Peoples' Day
