= Benjamin Frater =

Australian poet

Benjamin Frater (27 February 1979 – 4 July 2007), also known as "the Catholic Yak", was an Australian poet.

== Biography ==
Frater was born to Howard and Denise Frater and grew up in Campbelltown, New South Wales, west of Sydney, Australia. He attended Airds High School before going on to the University of Wollongong where he was only a semester away from finishing his degree at the time of his death. He called himself "the Catholic Yak" for unknown reasons and cited Francis Webb, Edmund Spenser, Allen Ginsburg, and Russian futurist poetry as inspirations for his works. He published one book of poetry during his life titled Bughouse Meat in 2003 and was reportedly working on an epic centered on the Greenacre Tavern titled "Preyed Hotel". A collection of selected poems, 6am in the Universe, was published posthumously in 2011 by Grand Parade Poets. He is the subject of a documentary produced by Lisa Nicol which earned silver at the 2012 New York Festivals International Radio Program and Promotions Awards.

Frater was married to Alise Blayney, a poet and mental health educator. Frater suffered from schizophrenia that was being treated by the anti-psychotic drug clozapine at the time of his death. He was 28 years old. A plaque was dedicated to his memory on the campus of his alma mater in 2011.
