= Fraternal =

Fraternal may refer to:

- Fraternal organization, an organized society of men associated together in an environment of companionship and brotherhood, dedicated to the intellectual, physical, and social development of its members
- Fraternal order, a fraternity organised as an order
- Fraternal correction, the admonishing of one's neighbor by a private individual with the purpose of reforming or, if possible, preventing the neighbor's sinful indulgence
- Fraternal party, a political party officially affiliated with another, often larger and/or international, political party or governmental party
- Fraternal Day, a legal holiday in the state of Alabama in the United States

== See also ==
- Fraternity (disambiguation)
