= Italian Americans for a Multicultural United States =

Italian-American organization

- Founded: 1992; 34 years ago
- Headquarters: New York City, U.S.

Italian Americans for a Multicultural United States (IAMUS) was a progressive Italian-American organization founded in New York City in 1992.

== About ==
IAMUS was founded by radical Italian-American activists in New York City in 1992 in order to protest the quincentennial celebration of Christopher Columbus's voyage to the Caribbean and to promote anti-racism among Italian-Americans. The organization's "statement of purpose" urged Italian-Americans to recognize the "wrongs inflicted on people of color" as well as the "privileges from which Italian Americans and other groups of European ancestry benefit". IAMUS has been part of a movement originating among left-wing Italian-Americans in the 1990s that advocates against memorializing the legacy of Christoper Columbus.

IAMUS participated in a 75th anniversary rally marking the execution of Sacco and Vanzetti in New York City on August 23, 2002. Making a comparison to modern day anti-Arab racism, anti-South Asian racism, and Islamophobia, an IAMUS member stated that "Today, Sacco and Vanzetti are long dead and it’s safe to feel sympathy for them" but that "[M]any Italian Americans look back with nostalgia, from a comfortable position of white privilege, at this era when we actually were an oppressed national minority subject to persecution...when Sacco and Vanzetti were facing execution and needing support, lots of Italian Americans - the establishment, some professionals, the wealthy - would have nothing to do with them. They didn’t want to be associated with those radicals and 'terrorists.'"

== See also ==
- Italian Americans for Indigenous Peoples Day
- Italians in New York City
