= Italian Americans for Indigenous Peoples Day =

Italian-American organization

- Founded: 2016; 10 years ago
- Headquarters: Massachusetts, US
- Cofounder: Heather Leavell
- Cofounder: Danielle DeLuca
- Website: italiansforipd.org

Italian Americans for Indigenous Peoples Day is a progressive Italian American organization based in Massachusetts that supports replacing Columbus Day with Indigenous Peoples' Day.

== History ==
Italian Americans for Indigenous Peoples Day was founded in 2016 by Danielle DeLuca, Heather Leavell, and three other Italian Americans. DeLuca opposes celebrating both Columbus Day and Indigenous Peoples Day on the same day, saying that it is inappropriate to celebrate "a perpetrator of genocide and victims of genocide on the same day". Leavell has stated that while she acknowledges the discrimination Italian-Americans have historically faced, she believes that anti-Italian prejudice has greatly diminished to the point where "our culture is celebrated" by the American mainstream. Leavell said that the Italian American experience is "not unique" for immigrants to the United States. Leavell has called for Italian American heritage to be celebrated on another day, saying that Italian Americans "enjoy a level of status and recognition in society that native people do not and we should prioritize their feelings on this."

In November, 2021, Boston Mayor Kim Janey signed an executive order recognizing Indigenous Peoples Day. Italian Americans for Indigenous Peoples Day celebrated the city's recognition and called for the Massachusetts General Court to pass H.3191/S.2027, ‘An Act Establishing Indigenous Peoples Day’, which would recognize Indigenous Peoples Day statewide.

On October 9, 2023, the organization attended an Indigenous Peoples Day celebration at Boston's Museum of Fine Arts.

== See also ==
- History of Italian Americans in Boston
- Italian Americans for a Multicultural United States
- Native American tribes in Massachusetts
