= Indigenous Peoples' Day =

Indigenous Peoples' Day may refer to:

- International Day of the World's Indigenous Peoples, a United Nations event recognised as a public holiday in various countries observed annually on 9 August
- Indigenous Peoples' Day (United States), a day recognizing Indigenous Peoples in the United States, observed annually on the second Monday in October
- National Indigenous Peoples Day, a day recognizing First Nations in Canada, observed annually on 21 June
- Indigenous Peoples Day (Brazil), annual celebration honouring the indigenous peoples of Brazil, observed annually on April 19
- Indigenous Peoples Day, annual celebration honouring the indigenous peoples of Suriname, observed on August 9
