= Airds High School =

Coordinates: 34.0872°S 150.8274°E

Location
- 2 Briar Rd, Airds; Airds; Sydney, New South Wales, 2560; Australia

Information
- School type: Government-funded co-educational comprehensive secondary day school
- Motto: Strive to Achieve
- Established: 1974; 52 years ago
- School district: Campbelltown District
- Principal: Steve McGuire

Airds High School is a government-funded co-educational comprehensive secondary day school, located on Briar Road in Airds, a suburb in Campbelltown, Sydney, NSW, Australia.

== History ==
Airds High School was established in 1974 to serve the rapidly growing, newly developed housing commission area in the Campbelltown district.

In 2024, the school turned 50, and held a School Fete in celebration. Many activities were open to students, including petting zoos, doughnut stands and jumping castles.

The Principal of Airds High School is Steve McGuire.
