= Native American Day =

Holiday honoring Native American cultures

Native American Day is a holiday observed in several US states in celebration of Native American culture. In California and Nevada, the holiday is designated on the fourth Friday of September, whereas in South Dakota and Wisconsin, it falls on the second Monday of October. Within each of these states, Native American Day honors the cultural contributions of Native American communities to the respective state's history, as well as to the overall country. The state of Washington celebrates Native American Heritage Day on the Friday immediately following the fourth Thursday in November. The state of Tennessee observes a similar American Indian Day each year on the fourth Monday of September. President George W. Bush signed into law legislation introduced by Congressman Joe Baca (D-Calif.), to designate the Friday after Thanksgiving as Native American Heritage Day.

== California ==
Native American Day (CA)
- Observed by: California
- Type: Historical
- Significance: A day in honor of Native Americans
- Date: Fourth Friday in September
- 2025 date: September 26
- 2026 date: September 25
- 2027 date: September 24
- 2028 date: September 22
- Frequency: annual

In 1939, Governor Culbert Olson declared October 1 to be "Indian Day", making California the first state to honor this holiday. In 1968, Governor Ronald Reagan signed a resolution calling for a holiday called American Indian Day, to be held the Fourth Friday in September. In 1998, the California Assembly passed AB 1953, which made Native American Day an official state holiday, designated annually on the fourth Friday in September. In 2021, the State of California amended section 135 of the Code of Civil Procedure (effective January 1, 2022), making Native American Day a judicial holiday; Columbus Day remains on the list of holidays in Government Code 6700, but it is no longer a judicial holiday.

== Nevada ==
In 1997, the state of Nevada also declared the Fourth Friday of September as Native American Day.

== South Dakota ==
Native American Day (SD)
- Observed by: South Dakota
- Type: Historical
- Significance: A day in honor of Native Americans
- Date: Second Monday in October
- 2025 date: October 13
- 2026 date: October 12
- 2027 date: October 11
- 2028 date: October 9
- Frequency: annual

In 1989, the South Dakota legislature unanimously passed legislation proposed by Governor George S. Mickelson to proclaim 1990 as the "Year of Reconciliation" between Native Americans and whites, to change Columbus Day to Native American Day and to make Martin Luther King's birthday into a state holiday. Since 1990, the second Monday in October has been celebrated as Native American Day in South Dakota.

On October 3, 2017, The Proclamation of Native American day was announced by the Mayor of Sioux Falls, South Dakota. Accepting the Proclamation would be the Lakota-Dakota-Nakota representatives of Sioux Falls.

South Dakota and Vermont, which celebrates Indigenous Peoples' Day, are the only states to practice non-observance of the federal holiday of Columbus Day.

== Tennessee ==
American Indian Day (TN)
- Observed by: Tennessee
- Type: Historical
- Significance: A day in honor of Native Americans
- Date: Fourth Monday in September
- 2025 date: September 22
- 2026 date: September 28
- 2027 date: September 27
- 2028 date: September 25
- Frequency: Annual

In 1994, the state General Assembly established the "fourth Monday in September of each year" to be especially observed in Tennessee as "American Indian Day" (TCA 15-2-106), "to recognize the contributions of American Indians with suitable ceremony and fellowship designed to promote greater understanding and brotherhood between American Indians and the non-Indian people of the state of Tennessee".

== Washington ==
In 2014, the Washington state Legislature designated the Friday immediately following the fourth Thursday in November, currently a state legal and school holiday" to be recognized and honored as "Native American Heritage Day" recognize and honor Washington state's proud and resonant Native American heritage".

== See also ==
- Indigenous Peoples' Day (United States)
- Indigenous Peoples Day (Brazil)
- Native American Heritage Day
- Native American Indian Heritage Month
- Opposition to Columbus celebrations
