= Native American Heritage Day =

Civil holiday observed the day after Thanksgiving in the United States

- Observed by: United States of America
- Type: Historical
- Significance: A day in honor of Native Americans
- Date: Day after U.S. Thanksgiving
- 2024 date: November 29
- 2025 date: November 28
- 2026 date: November 27
- 2027 date: November 26
- Frequency: annual

Native American Heritage Day is a civil holiday observed on the day after Thanksgiving in the United States.

== History ==
Arthur C. Parker, a Seneca Indian who was the director of the Museum of Arts and Science in Rochester, New York, advocated for an American Indian Day in the 1910s and persuaded the Boy Scouts of America to take a day to commemorate the Native American culture in 1912. It was recognized annually for three years. In 1915, the annual Congress of American Indian Association meeting in Lawrence, Kansas, formally approved a plan for a Native American Day. The president, Sherman Coolidge, an Arapaho, called upon the country to observe the day. Coolidge made a proclamation on September 28, 1915, which made the second Saturday of May as the first official Native American Day. New York became the first state to recognize Native American Day on the second Saturday of May in 1916. Other states during later chose the fourth Friday in September, Columbus Day, to celebrate the day, including Illinois in 1919.

In 1986, Congress passed a law requesting that President Ronald Reagan declare the week of November 23, "American Indian Week". President Reagan honored the request with Proclamation 5577, which recognized the contributions of American Indians to the country. Shortly after "Native American Week" in 1990, Congress requested that November be declared "National Native American Heritage Month". President George H. W. Bush accepted this request with Proclamation 6230. Subsequent Novembers were recognized as National Native American Heritage month as well.

In 2008, Congress passed a law signed by President George W. Bush making the Friday after Thanksgiving National Native American Heritage Day.

Some individual states have also taken legislative action to recognize this day. For example, Maryland established this day in 2008 under the name American Indian Heritage Day. The Washington state legislature approved a similar measure in 2013.

== Criticism ==
Native American Heritage Day has faced heavy criticism from Native Americans, as the date of the holiday is seen by many as an insult or in poor taste to Indigenous heritage and culture. Thanksgiving is known as the National Day of Mourning for many Native Americans, as they believe it celebrates events correlated with the displacement and murder of Natives. Ned Blackhawk, a professor at Yale University, echoed these sentiments.

Another criticism is that Native American Heritage Day falls on Black Friday, which is seen as a day that tends to celebrate capitalism, greed, and materialism.

== See also ==
- Indigenous Peoples' Day
