= Fraternal Day =

Legal holiday in Alabama

- Observed by: Alabama
- Type: Historical
- Date: second Monday in October
- 2025 date: October 13
- 2026 date: October 12
- 2027 date: October 11
- 2028 date: October 9
- Frequency: annual

Fraternal Day is a legal holiday in the state of Alabama in the United States. It is celebrated annually on the second Monday in October on the same day as Columbus Day and American Indian Heritage Day.

Fraternal Day was originally celebrated in Alabama on the second Thursday of October beginning in 1915.

In 1915, The Fraternal Monitor, published by the National Fraternal Congress of America, included notes regarding a Fraternal Day celebration to be held April 22 in San Francisco. Fraternal Day Chairman Dempster personally invited President Woodrow Wilson and the Monitor promoted it as "the greatest fraternal gathering, and likewise the greatest peace gathering, ever held in this country."

In 1915, Senator Morris Sheppard of Texas introduced to the United States Senate the National Fraternal Day bill to adopt October 27 as a federal holiday celebrating Fraternal Day. The bill did not pass.

In 1915, The Morning Oregonian reported that at April 22 Fair at the Exposition Grounds, San Francisco "a host of fraternal organizations descended on the exposition in celebration of fraternal day." Charles W. Dempster, chairman of the National Fraternal Day committee was a guest speaker.

In Sacramento, California, Pioneer and Fraternal Day was celebrated as one of a series of celebrations during the Days of '49 Celebration from May 23 to May 29, 1922.

In Reading, Pennsylvania, The Reading Eagle reported on February 28, 1923, that 70 organizations were scheduled to participate in Reading's 175th Anniversary week with one day designated as Fraternal day.

The National Congress of Fraternal Organization, calling for a National Fraternal Day, stated in its Fraternal Monitor publication, "“Mighty forces have been, and are at work in the cause of Darkness against the spirit, precepts and application alike of the teachings of Fraternalism – which are the applied Golden Rule.”

Madison, Alabama held its first Fraternal Day Celebration on Sunday October 12, 2014 at the Hogan Family YMCA. Participating organizations included the North Alabama Veterans and Fraternal Organizations Coalition, Madison County District 2 of the Grand Lodge of Free and Accepted Masons of Alabama, the United Way, and the Madison Chamber of Commerce.
