= Timeline of support for Indigenous Peoples' Day =

This page is a timeline for when various municipalities, universities, and states in the United States have officially recognized Indigenous Peoples' Day.

== Timeline ==
=== 1977 ===
- The International Conference on Discrimination Against Indigenous Populations in the Americas, sponsored by the United Nations in Geneva, Switzerland, began to discuss replacing Columbus Day in the United States with a celebration to be known as Indigenous Peoples' Day.

=== 1989 ===
- South Dakota (celebrated as Native American Day)

=== 1990 ===
- At the First Continental Conference on 500 Years of Indian Resistance in Quito, Ecuador, representatives of Indian groups throughout the Americas agreed that they would mark 1992, the 500th anniversary of the first of the voyages of Christopher Columbus, as a year to promote "continental unity" and "liberation."

=== 1992 ===
- The city council of Berkeley, California, declared October 12 as a "Day of Solidarity with Indigenous People", and 1992 the "Year of Indigenous People". The city implemented related programs in schools, libraries, and museums. The city symbolically renamed Columbus Day as "Indigenous Peoples' Day" beginning in 1992 to protest the historical conquest of North America by Europeans, and to call attention to the losses suffered by the Native American peoples and their cultures through diseases, warfare, massacres, and forced assimilation.

=== 1994 ===
- Santa Cruz, California

=== 2014 ===
April

- The city council of Minneapolis, Minnesota, officially voted to recognize Indigenous Peoples' Day along with Columbus Day.

- Red Wing, Minnesota, replaced Columbus Day with Chief Red Wing Day to honor the city's namesake, Hupaha-duta, the Dakota leader known in English as "Red Wing".

October

- The city council of Seattle, Washington, officially renamed Columbus Day to Indigenous Peoples' Day.

- Bellingham, Washington passed an ordinance recognizing the second Monday of October as Coast Salish Day in honor of the indigenous peoples of the Salish Sea bioregion.

- Minnesota State University, Mankato began celebrating Indigenous Peoples' Day in place of Columbus Day, following an official vote to establish this by the Minnesota State Student Association.

December

- The city council of Grand Rapids, Minnesota, passed a resolution recognizing Indigenous Peoples' Day.

=== 2015 ===
- Alpena, Michigan
- Bellingham, Washington
- Bexar County, Texas
- Corvallis, Oregon
- Fargo, North Dakota
- Grand Marais and Cook County, Minnesota
- Hillsborough, North Carolina

February

- The City Commission of Traverse City, Michigan, passed a resolution recognizing Indigenous Peoples’ Day.

May

- The Town of Newstead and the Village of Akron, New York, and the Akron Central School District, voted to celebrate Indigenous People's Day on Columbus Day.

August

- The City Council of St. Paul, Minnesota, unanimously passed a resolution recognizing Indigenous Peoples’ Day in place of Columbus Day.

- The City of Olympia, Washington, officially declared the second Monday of October as Indigenous Peoples’ Day to honor the area’s Native American heritage.

September

- The Town and Village of Lewiston, New York, declared the second Monday of October, Indigenous Peoples' Day, on September 28 and October 5, 2015, respectively.

- The Mayor of the City of Anadarko, Oklahoma signed the Indigenous Peoples’ Day proclamation, while surrounded by members and tribal leaders from the Apache, Choctaw, Delaware, Wichita and Affiliated Tribes, recognizing the second Monday in October as Indigenous Peoples’ Day.

October

- The cities of Anchorage, Alaska; Portland, Oregon; Carrboro, North Carolina; and Albuquerque, New Mexico adopted similar resolutions.

- Governor Bill Walker of Alaska issued an executive proclamation renaming Columbus Day "Indigenous Peoples' Day."

- The city of San Fernando, California, passed a resolution recognizing Indigenous Peoples' Day. The City of San Fernando may be the first city in Los Angeles County to recognize this day.

December

- On December 15, the City Council of Belfast, Maine approved the renaming of Columbus Day as Indigenous Peoples' Day.

=== 2016 ===
- Ann Arbor, Michigan
- Beaverton, Oregon
- Bozeman, Montana
- Ferndale, Michigan
- Lawrence, Kansas
- Madison, Wisconsin
- Minnesota
- Syracuse University
- University of Central Oklahoma
- Ypsilanti, Michigan
- Winona State University, Minnesota

January

- The City Council of Durango, Colorado unanimously voted to celebrate Indigenous Peoples' Day on the second Monday of October.

- The Mayor and City Council of Asheville, North Carolina voted unanimously to adopt Indigenous Peoples' Day.

- The student body of the University of Utah voted unanimously to support the replacement of the annual "Columbus Day" holiday to "Indigenous Peoples' Day".

February

- The faculty of Brown University voted to designate the second Monday of October as "Indigenous Peoples' Day".

March

- The City Council of Eugene, Oregon voted unanimously to approve a resolution declaring the second Monday of October as Indigenous Peoples’ Day.

June

- The City of Cambridge, Massachusetts voted unanimously (9–0) to rename Columbus Day to Indigenous Peoples' Day. The Massachusetts communities of Amherst and Northampton, by the time early October 2016 arrived, had joined Cambridge in similarly re-naming the early October date.

August

- The City of Boulder, Colorado voted unanimously (9–0) to establish Indigenous Peoples' Day.

- The City of Spokane, Washington approved the establishment of Indigenous Peoples Day by a 6 to 1 vote.

September

- The City Council of Bainbridge Island, Washington unanimously approved a resolution declaring the second Monday in October as Indigenous Peoples' Day.

- The East Lansing, Michigan city council voted unanimously without discussion to declare the second Monday in October Indigenous Peoples' Day.

The Council of Santa Fe, New Mexico unanimously (8–0) approved a resolution declaring the second Monday in October, or what traditionally is Columbus Day, as Indigenous Peoples' Day in Santa Fe.

October

- The Denver City Council unanimously (12–0) approved a resolution permanently recognizing Indigenous Peoples' Day on the second Monday of October.

- The City Council of Yakima, Washington voted 5 to 2 to change Columbus Day to Indigenous Peoples' Day.

- The City Council of Phoenix, Arizona voted unanimously (9–0) to recognize Indigenous Peoples' Day annually on Columbus Day. It was the largest US city to take such action.

- Vermont Governor Peter Shumlin signed a proclamation declaring that October 10, 2016 will be observed as Indigenous People's Day in the state. The statement also acknowledges that the state was founded and built upon lands first inhabited by indigenous peoples.

- Mayor Gregory F. Vaughn of Harpers Ferry, West Virginia signed a proclamation introduced to the Town Council by Recorder Kevin Carden declaring that day, and the second Monday of each subsequent October, to be called Indigenous Peoples' Day in the town.

=== 2017 ===
- Bar Harbor, Maine
- Brookline, Massachusetts
- Charlottesville, Virginia
- Cornell University
- Davenport, Iowa
- Durham, New Hampshire
- Eau Claire, Wisconsin
- Falls Church, Virginia
- Graceland University
- Ithaca, New York
- Kalamazoo, Michigan
- Kansas City, Missouri
- Long Beach, California (Note: The City of Long Beach does not actually observe the holiday by closing its offices, or giving its employees paid time off; nor does it encourage private businesses to close in observation.)
- Los Angeles County, California
- Moscow, Idaho
- Nashville, Tennessee
- Newark, New Jersey
- Norman, Oklahoma
- Oak Park, Illinois
- Stanford, Kentucky
- Tahlequah, Oklahoma
- Trinidad and Tobago
- Tulsa, Oklahoma
- University of Alaska Fairbanks
- Watsonville, California

March
- At a town meeting in Starks, Maine, an Indigenous Peoples' Day proposal was approved, 32–2, replacing Columbus Day observances.

August
- On August 21, Oberlin, Ohio officially approved the change to Indigenous Peoples' Day.

- One week later, on August 28, Bangor, Maine made it official as well.

- As of August 30, the Los Angeles City Council authorized the celebration of Indigenous Peoples' Day in place of Columbus Day.

September
- On September 11, Orono became the third city in Maine to adopt Indigenous Peoples' Day.
- On September 18, both Brunswick and Portland in Maine adopted the change to Indigenous Peoples Day.

October

- On October 3, Iowa City Mayor Jim Throgmorton signed a proclamation adopting the change to Indigenous People's Day followed by the Johnson County, Iowa, Board of Supervisors on October 5.
- On October 5, the Austin City Council adopted the change to Indigenous Peoples' Day.
- On October 9, the Eau Claire School Board (the eighth largest school district in Wisconsin) adopted the change to Indigenous Peoples Day.
- On October 9, the Cities of Salt Lake City, Utah, Burbank, California, and San Luis Obispo, California officially celebrated and adopted Indigenous Peoples' Day.
- The city of Aspen, Colorado followed Denver and Boulder in conferring recognition of Indigenous Peoples' Day.

=== 2018 ===
- Akron, Ohio (as North American First People's Day on the first Monday of October)
- Berea, Kentucky
- Boise, Idaho
- Brodhead, Kentucky
- Burnside, Kentucky
- Cincinnati, Ohio
- Corbin, Kentucky
- Corpus Christi, Texas
- Crab Orchard, Kentucky
- Drake University
- Frankfort, Kentucky
- Gouldsboro, Maine
- Harrodsburg, Kentucky
- Helena, Montana
- Hopkinsville, Kentucky
- Iowa
- Junction City, Kentucky
- Lancaster, Kentucky
- Lawton, Oklahoma
- Liberty, Kentucky
- Livingston, Kentucky
- London, Kentucky
- Louisville, Kentucky
- Mankato, Minnesota
- Mt. Vernon, Kentucky
- North Carolina
- Oklahoma City, Oklahoma
- Okmulgee, Oklahoma
- Perryville, Kentucky
- Pittsfield, Massachusetts
- Prestonsburg, Kentucky
- Pullman, Washington
- Richmond, Kentucky
- Rochester, New York
- Russell Springs, Kentucky
- San Francisco, California
- Science Hill, Kentucky
- Somerset, Kentucky
- South Fulton, Georgia
- Southfield, Michigan
- Springfield, Kentucky
- Tacoma, Washington
- Taylorsville, Kentucky
- University of New Mexico

January

- A House Bill was introduced in the legislature of the State of New Hampshire that would rename Columbus Day to Indigenous Peoples' Day statewide.

February
- School board officials in Southampton, New York voted to replace Columbus Day with Indigenous Peoples' Day on all school calendars.

July
- Tompkins County, New York officials voted to recognize Indigenous Peoples' Day, in addition to Columbus Day.

September
- The mayor of the city of Somerville, Massachusetts announced that the city will observe Indigenous Peoples' Day rather than Columbus Day.

October
- The City Council of Flagstaff, Arizona unanimously passed a resolution which renamed Columbus Day to Indigenous Peoples' Day in addition to committing city resources to combating racism against Native Americans.

=== 2019 ===
- Ada, Oklahoma
- Bloomington, Indiana
- California (Note: The State of California does not actually observe the holiday by closing its offices, or giving its employees paid time off; nor does it encourage private businesses to close in observation.)
- Dallas, Texas
- Davis, California
- District of Columbia
- Grand Forks, North Dakota
- Great Barrington, Massachusetts
- Hopkinton, New Hampshire
- Keene, New Hampshire
- Keene State College
- Lasell University
- Louisiana
- Maine
- Marathon County, Wisconsin
- Marblehead, Massachusetts
- Mashpee, Massachusetts
- Michigan
- Moorhead, Minnesota
- New Mexico
- Princeton, New Jersey
- Provincetown, Massachusetts
- Reno, Nevada
- South Lake Tahoe, California
- Takoma Park, Maryland
- Wisconsin
- Wichita, Kansas

September

- The Ventura County, California Board of Supervisors voted unanimously to observe Indigenous Peoples' Day in place of Columbus Day.

=== 2020 ===
- Baltimore, Maryland
- Colorado Springs, Colorado
- Dover, New Hampshire
- Exeter, New Hampshire
- The Columbus City Council of Columbus, Ohio set October 12 as Indigenous Peoples' Day, after removing Columbus Day as a holiday in 2018.
- Gig Harbor, Washington
- Harris County, Texas
- Houston, Texas
- Mansfield, Connecticut
- Nashua, New Hampshire
- Norristown, Pennsylvania
- Salem, Massachusetts
- Salisbury, Maryland
- Virginia

=== 2021 ===
- Arlington, Massachusetts
- Bedford, Massachusetts
- Belmont, Massachusetts
- Boston, Massachusetts
- Easthampton, Massachusetts
- East Lyme, Connecticut (Columbus Day still recognized)
- Falmouth, Massachusetts
- Hartford, Connecticut
- Holyoke, Massachusetts
- Inyo County, California
- Maynard, Massachusetts
- Melrose, Massachusetts
- Muncie, Indiana
- Newton, Massachusetts
- Oregon
- Philadelphia, PA
- Tempe, Arizona
- Texas
- United States (federal government), by President Joe Biden. by signing a presidential proclamation declaring October 11, 2021 to be a national holiday. Revoked in 2025 by Trump.
- Wellesley, Massachusetts
- West Lafayette, Indiana
