= Harold Stonebridge Fischer =

Founder of "President's Day" holiday in the United States

- Born: June 7, 1910
- Died: April 6, 1982 (aged 71)
- Resting place: Huntington Beach, California, U.S.
- Known for: 20-year advocacy for Presidents Day as a federal holiday
- Title: National Executive Director, President's Day National Committee
- Political party: Republican

Harold Stonebridge "Hal" Fischer (June 7, 1910 – April 6, 1982) was an American activist, composer, and poet. He was the founder of the "President's Day National Committee" which urged the observance of what he called Presidents' Day in the United States, spent over twenty years lobbying the U.S. Congress for the formal creation of the holiday, and successfully lobbied all U.S. governors to enact the holiday at the state level.

== Life and career ==
Fischer was born on June 7, 1910 in Chicago, Illinois. He worked in the insurance industry and as a calculator salesman. Fischer and his family later lived in Compton, California.

Fischer was an active Republican, and ran unsuccessfully as a candidate for California's 53rd congressional district. His campaign was based on "public service before politics."

=== Presidents' Day ===
In 1951, Fischer formed the "President's Day National Committee" and served as its National Executive Director for the next two decades. The purpose of the committee was not to honor any particular president but to honor the office of the presidency in a non-partisan manner. He originally proposed March 4, the original inauguration day, to be deemed "Presidents Day." In the early 1950s, Fischer began a multi-year national letter writing and media campaign to reach federal elected officials, governors, mayors, and national fraternal organizations.

The bill recognizing March 4 was defeated in the Senate Judiciary Committee (which had authority over federal holidays). The committee felt that, given its proximity to Lincoln's and Washington's Birthdays, three holidays so close together would be unduly burdensome. However, over 40 governors across the country issued proclamations declaring March 4 "Presidents Day" in their respective states by 1954.

In March 1955, Fischer was recognized for his efforts in a speech delivered by Congressman Clyde Doyle on the floor of the House of Representatives. By the late 1950s, was referred to as the "founder of 'Presidents' Day" in newspapers across the United States. After six years of advocacy, Fischer had achieved recognition of the holiday across all 48 states in the country by 1957. In 1960, Fischer organized a campaign to encourage children to write letters to the president, with a goal of 10 million letters to President Dwight D. Eisenhower.

On January 1, 1971, the new Uniform Monday Holiday Act shifted the holiday to the third Monday in February, and most states followed suit.

Fischer encouraged educational institutions and state departments of education to "take fullest advantage of this day in their schools" by teaching about the American presidency and Constitution of the United States in their curriculums.

== Death ==
Fischer died on April 6, 1982 and is interred at Good Shepherd Cemetery in Huntington Beach, California.

== Awards and honors ==
In 1952, Fischer was the recipient of the Freedom Foundation's Freedom Award medal.

== Works ==
Fischer received a copyright for a 1941 World War II song titled Roll up your Sleeves for Freedom. Fischer also published a patriotic poem entitled American's Answer.
