= Linguistic features of Spanish as spoken by Catalan speakers =

Language contact

The Spanish language is widely spoken in most of the Catalan-speaking territories, where it is partly characterized by language contact with the Catalan language. These territories are: Catalonia, the Valencian Community (except some inland areas which are only Spanish-speaking), the Balearic Islands, Andorra, and the easternmost areas of Aragon. This linguistic contact is encouraged by the fact that almost all of the Catalan speakers in these regions are Catalan–Spanish bilingual to a greater or lesser extent.

Many of the features of this Spanish language variety are present due to the transfer of distinctive features of the Catalan language. Many speakers whose native language is Catalan feature an accent brought about through the transfer of phonetic and phonological features from Catalan; such features are recognized by the listener as a "Catalan accent".

Some of the listed features can sometimes be found in native Spanish speakers who live in Catalan-speaking areas; however, in the case of speakers who are not bilingual, this happens almost exclusively with lexical features.

== Linguistic features ==
How a Catalan speaker's Spanish manifests depends heavily on individual sociolinguistic variables related to age, native language, and the differing environments of language use. It is therefore not a uniform variety with little variation. Many of the features listed below are present with very different frequencies in different speakers, and some of the features could be absent in many speakers (particularly those whose main native language is Spanish, who transfer fewer typical Catalan features).

Most Spanish speakers in Catalan-speaking territories use linguistic forms that are not regionally marked; that is, their speech is similar to that of much of Spain; however, there is a tendency, especially among members of the working class, to use forms typical of southern Spanish dialects.

=== Phonetics ===
The phonetic features listed below occur much more frequently among speakers whose main language is Catalan than they do among speakers whose main language is Spanish. All of them can be considered transfer of phonetic features from Catalan to Spanish:

Consonants

- Word-final -d is often devoiced and fortified to [t]: autorida[t], verda[t], amista[t], Madri[t].
  - In Valencia, /d/ in the -ada suffix can be elided, as in Southern Peninsular Spanish: Mocadorada [mokaðoˈɾaða] → [moka.oˈɾaː].
- /l/ can be velarized [ɫ], especially in coda position.
- Less presence of yeísmo than among native speakers, and thus distinction of ll (/ʎ/) and y (/ʝ/). However, this feature is in decline; even in Catalan yeísmo is starting to take hold in many comarcas: Castell [kasˈtej].
- Higher frequency of /s/ voicing and the occurrence thereof between vowels.
  - In part of the Valencian Community, the suffix -eza (-esa in Valencian) is commonly reduced to ea: bellea [beˈʎe.a] or [beˈʝe.a] 'beauty'.
- Mainly in speakers with a limited command of Spanish, seseo, that is, the phoneme /θ/ is realized as [s].
- Also for speakers with a limited command of Spanish, and very rare nowadays, the Spanish phoneme /x/ used to be realized as [k].

Vowels

- The high vowels /i, u/ are more open than in Spanish. Unstressed /i, u/ are centralized.
  - In Valencian and most Balearic dialects /i, u/ are further open and centralized.
- The articulation of some rising diphthongs as separate vowels in hiatus following the articulatory habits of Catalan; that is, the sequence weak vowel + strong vowel is pronounced as two vowels in two separate syllables. Examples: tiene as [tiˈene] rather than [ˈtjene]; duele as [duˈeɫe] rather than [ˈdwele].
- Articulation of the rising diphthong iu [ju] as falling [iw]. Example: ciudad as [θiwˈðat] rather than [θjuˈðað].

=== Morphology ===
- Formation of diminutives the Catalan way, with -ete (-et in Catalan) and -eta. Although these forms are more common in Catalan-speaking territories, they also occur in other regions where Spanish is spoken, especially in eastern Spain.
- More frequent use of the adjective nominalization suffix -eza, even with three-syllable adjectives that in Spanish most frequently use -ez. For example: esbelteza instead of esbeltez.
- The use of ves (from Catalan vés) as the second-person singular informal (tú) imperative of the verb ir, instead of the standard ve: Ves a casa y tráeme la chaqueta for Ve a casa y tráeme el abrigo ('Go home and bring me the coat').

=== Syntax ===
The following features are common:

- The use of the preposition sin like Catalan sense, which can be used adverbially without a complement; therefore, for example, exchanges such as the following can occur: A: ¿Traes la raqueta? B: He venido sin (for He venido sin ella)
- The appearance of the particle que at the beginning of questions: ¿Que te gusta el piso? instead of ¿Te gusta el piso? ('Do you like the flat?')
- The use of possessive pronouns instead of various sequences of de + strong objective pronoun: Vete delante mío for Vete delante de mí, Vamos detrás suyo for Vamos detrás de él. This phenomenon also occurs in many other varieties of Spanish; this occurs because of analogy with such pairs as izquierda de mí and izquierda mía.
- Tendency to use the definite article with the names of people, often considered slang in other Spanish-speaking areas: el Jordi, la Elena. There are Spanish-speaking regions not influenced by Catalan in which this also occurs. This is different from the standard Spanish use of the definite article with personal names in such sentences as la María que tú conoces es mi novia, no mi tía ('the María that you know is my girlfriend, not my aunt').
- The occasional preference of haber de + INFINITIVE instead of tener que + INFINITIVE ('(to) have to'). Although haber de does exist in standard Spanish, it is far more common to use tener que.
- Inflecting existential haber ('there be', as in "There is a cat on the porch.") such that it agrees in number with the complement
  Habían cuatro jueces en la competición rather than Había cuatro jueces en la competición ('There were four judges in the competition')

This also occurs in some non-Catalan-speaking areas; it is a typical feature of native Spanish speakers who were born in areas where historically the local speech was particularly divergent from standard Spanish (such as Zamora, Cáceres, Navarra, Murcia). It is virtually nonexistent in the core area of Burgos-Madrid-Andalusia.

- The use of certain prepositions the Catalan way:
  Estoy aquí a Barcelona for Estoy aquí en Barcelona
- Dequeísmo: Pienso de ir al teatro / Considero de que debería venir tu hermano. There are, however, internal reasons of Spanish grammar that cause the occurrence of this phenomenon outside this linguistic area.
- Extended use of hacer in periphrastic expressions: hacer un café con alguien for tomar un café con alguien ('have coffee with someone'), hacer piña for mantenerse unidos ('(to) stay united'), hacer país for ser patriota ('(to) be patriotic'), and so forth.

=== Lexicon ===
- Constructions such as hacer tarde (from the Catalan fer tard), hacer un café for tomar un café, sacarme la camisa for quitarme la camisa, tampoco no for tampoco, and plegar del trabajo for salir del trabajo.
- It is very common, especially in Catalonia, for the expression "Déu n'hi do!" (an exclamation of conformation, adequacy, or admiration: '¡No está nada mal!, ¡Es bastante!; literally 'God gave (enough)!' in an older form of Catalan) to be used, especially since there is no exact equivalent in Spanish.
- It is also common to use the Catalan word adéu instead of adiós ('goodbye').
- In the Valencian Country, Spanish speakers that learn Valencian in school sometimes use Valencian expressions like che (written xe in Valencian) or "Prou!" (instead of "¡Basta!") in their Spanish. The phrase no cal is also used instead of no hace falta ('it is not necessary'), despite the fact that the Castilianism no fa falta finds use in Valencian.
- Particularly in the Balearic Islands, it is very common to express objections with pero (pronounced as though it were peró, with stress on the second syllable, like Catalan però) at the end of the sentence, as in:
  "No viniste, peró!"
  "Yo no he sido, peró!"
- The frequent use of prestache (from the Catalan prestatge /pɾesˈtaddʒe/) to refer what is referred to as estante in standard Spanish, the use of rachola (from the Catalan rajola /raˈdʒɔla/) to refer what is referred to as baldosa or azulejo in standard Spanish, and the use of tocho (from the Catalan totxo /ˈtotʃo/) to refer to a ladrillo: brick (figuratively, a thick book).
- Some food terms derived from Catalan can be found in Spanish-language menus in Catalonia: barat (Catalan verat) for caballa (mackerel), monchetas (Catalan mongetes) for judías (beans), toñina (Catalan tonyina) for atún (tuna).
- Other examples are enchegar (from the Catalan engegar) instead of encender or prender, or nen instead of niño.
