= Presidents' Day =

US holiday honoring George Washington and other presidents

Washington's Birthday Presidents' Day
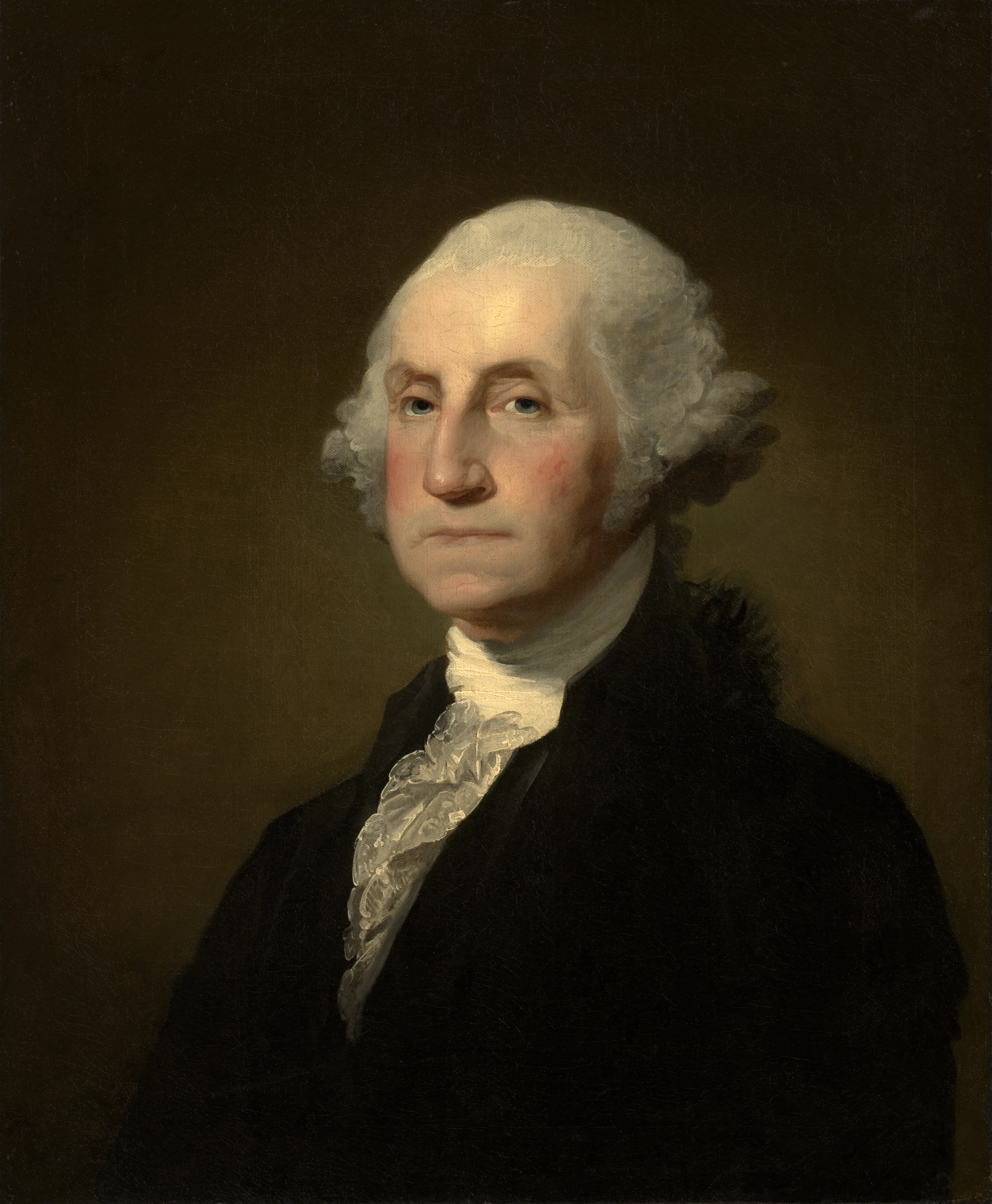
- George Washington by Gilbert Stuart (1797)
- Official name: Washington's Birthday
- Observed by: United States
- Type: Federal and most U.S. states and cities
- Celebrations: Community and national celebrations
- Date: third Monday in February
- Frequency: Annual
- First time: 1879 (as an official federal holiday)
- Related to: Lincoln's Birthday

Presidents' Day, officially Washington's Birthday at the federal governmental level, is a holiday in the United States celebrated on the third Monday of February. It is often celebrated to honor all those who served as presidents of the United States and, since 1879, has been the federal holiday honoring Founding Father George Washington, who led the Continental Army to victory in the American Revolutionary War, presided at the Constitutional Convention of 1787, and served as the first U.S. president from 1789 to 1797.

The day is an official state holiday in most states under various names. Depending upon the specific law, the state holiday may officially celebrate Washington alone, Washington and Abraham Lincoln, or some other combination of U.S. presidents (such as Washington and Thomas Jefferson, who was born in April).

George Washington was born on February 22, 1732 (N.S.). Washington's Birthday was celebrated on this date from 1879 until 1970. To give federal employees a three-day weekend, the 1968 Uniform Monday Holiday Act (effective in 1971) moved it to the third Monday in February, which can occur between February 15 and 21. The day soon became known as Presidents(') Day (the presence and placement of the apostrophe varies) and provides an occasion to remember all the U.S. presidents, to honor Abraham Lincoln's and Washington's birthdays together, or any single president of choice.

As many states and cities followed suit, some states that had been celebrating Lincoln's birthday on February 12 combined the two into Presidents' Day. Lincoln led the nation through the American Civil War, preserved the Union, abolished slavery, bolstered the federal government, and modernized the U.S. economy.

== Official state holidays ==
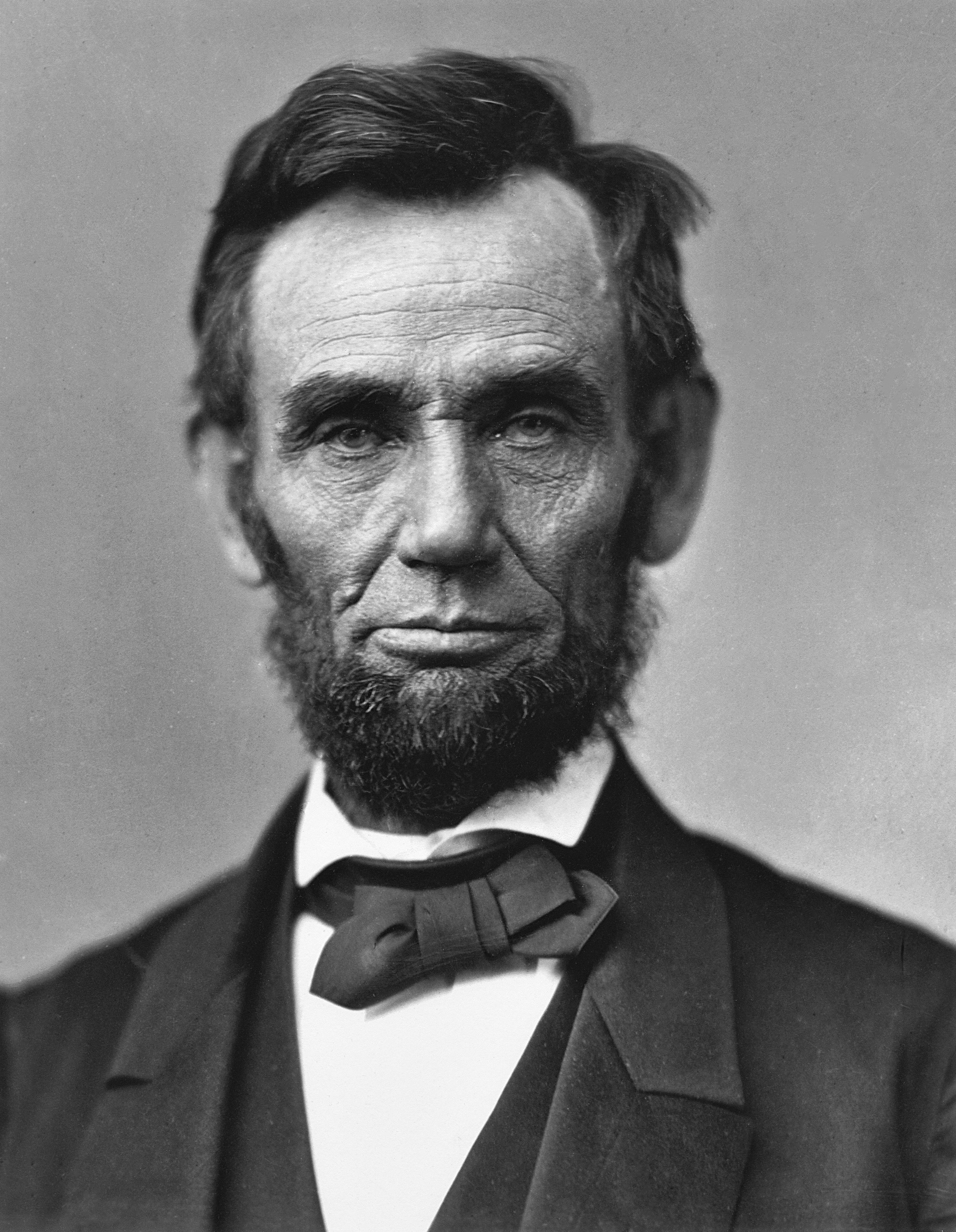
Abraham Lincoln by Alexander Gardner (1863)

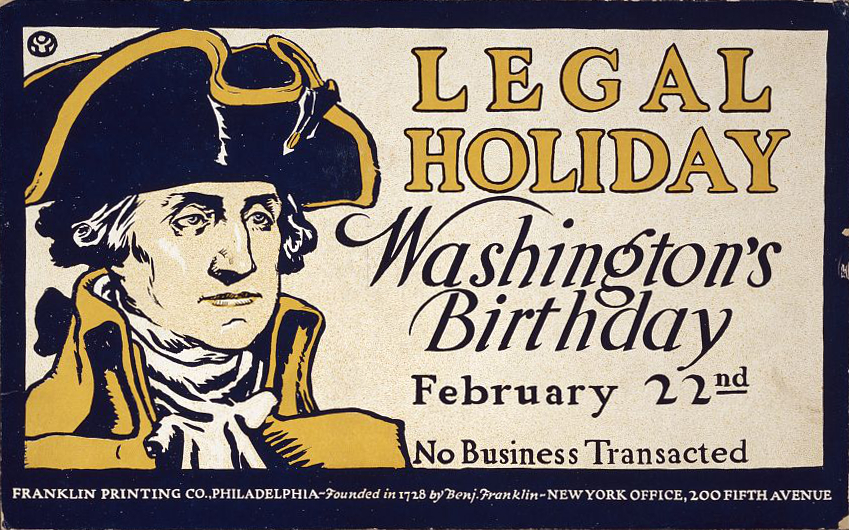
Washington's Birthday sign, c. 1890–1899

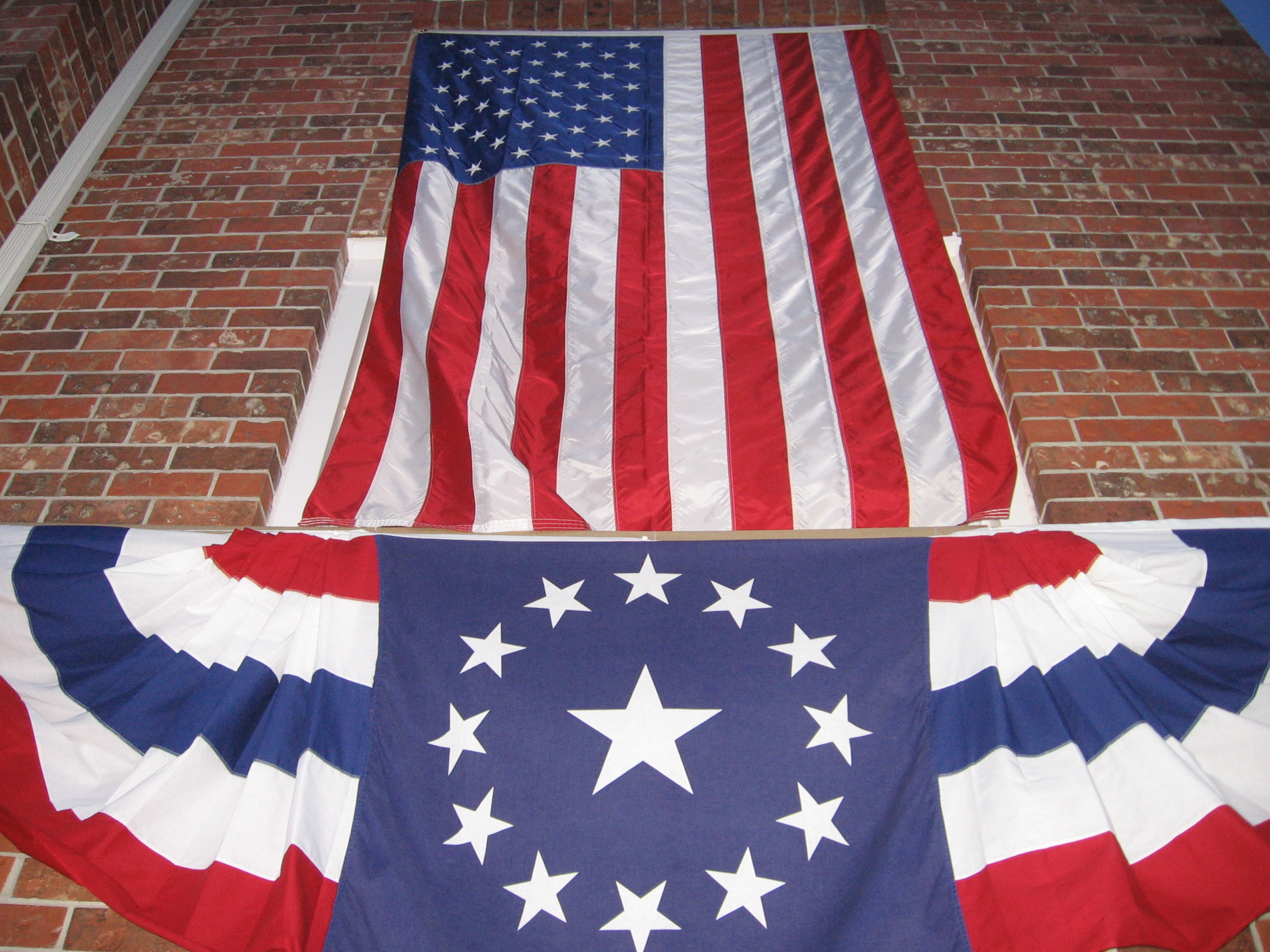
Flag and bunting mark Washington's Birthday in Toronto, Ontario

Lincoln's Birthday, February 12, was never a federal holiday, but nearly half the state governments have officially renamed their observances "Presidents' Day", "Washington and Lincoln Day", or other such designations. (In historical rankings of presidents of the United States, Lincoln and Washington are often the top two.)

In the following states and territories of the United States, this same day is an official state holiday and known as—

Using "President" in the official title:

- "Presidents' Day" in Hawaii, New Mexico, North Dakota, Oklahoma, Pennsylvania, Puerto Rico, South Dakota, Texas, Vermont, and Washington state
- "President's Day" in Alaska, Idaho, Maryland, Nebraska, New Hampshire, Tennessee, West Virginia, and Wyoming
- "Presidents Day" in Nevada and Oregon
- "Washington's Birthday/President's Day" in Maine
- "Lincoln/Washington Presidents' Day" in Arizona

Using "Washington" alone:

- "George Washington Day" in Virginia
- "Washington's Birthday" in Connecticut, Florida, Illinois, Iowa, Louisiana, Massachusetts, Michigan, North Carolina, New Jersey, New York, and Washington, DC.

Using both "Washington" and "Lincoln":

- "Lincoln's and Washington's Birthday" in Montana
- "Washington–Lincoln Day" in Colorado, Ohio
- "Washington and Lincoln Day" in Utah
- "Washington's and Lincoln's Birthday" in Minnesota

Using "Washington" and another person:

- "George Washington/Thomas Jefferson Birthday" in Alabama
- "George Washington's Birthday and Daisy Bates Day" in Arkansas

Using something else:

- "The third Monday in February" generic term used in California

- Abraham Lincoln's Birthday is a California state holiday, falling on February 12.

Not a holiday:

- Some states do not officially observe the holiday on this day and do not have a day celebrating Washington or presidents in general. Delaware does not observe the Washington's Birthday federal holiday.

Several states honor presidents with official state holidays that do not fall on the third Monday of February. In Massachusetts, the state officially celebrates "Washington's Birthday" on the same day as the federal holiday. State law also directs the governor to issue an annual "Presidents Day" proclamation on May 29 (John F. Kennedy's birthday), honoring the presidents with Massachusetts roots: Kennedy, John Adams, John Quincy Adams, and Calvin Coolidge. In California, Connecticut, Florida, Illinois, Michigan, New Jersey, and New York Lincoln's Birthday is a separate state holiday celebrated on February 12. In Missouri, Washington's Birthday is a federal holiday, observed on the third Monday in February, and Abraham Lincoln's birthday is observed on the Monday closest to February 12 (always the Monday preceding Washington's Birthday).

In New Mexico, Presidents' Day, at least as a state-government paid holiday, is observed on the Friday following Thanksgiving, although the legal public holiday remains the third Monday in February. In Georgia, Washington's Birthday is not a state-government paid holiday, although until 2018 it was officially observed on Christmas Eve. Similarly, in Indiana, Washington's Birthday is observed on Christmas Eve, or the day preceding the weekend if Christmas falls on Saturday or Sunday, while Lincoln's Birthday is the day after Thanksgiving.

== History ==
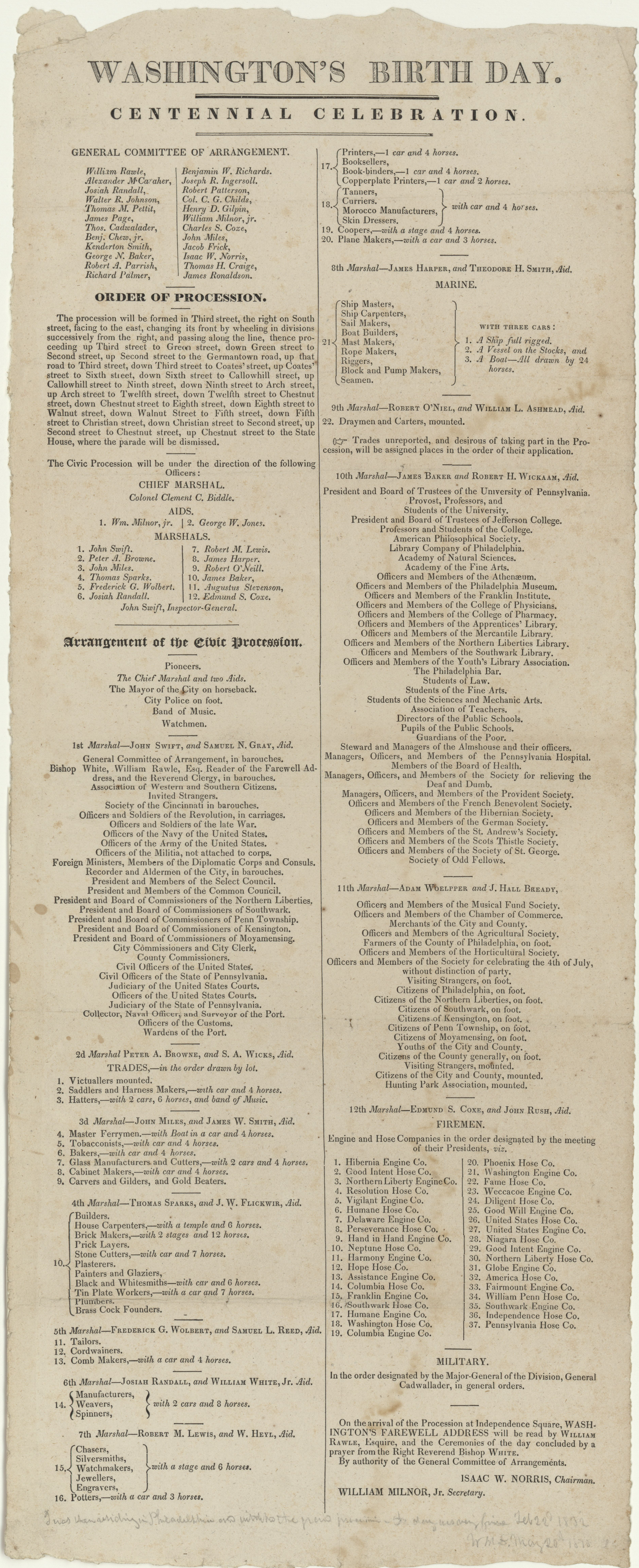
Procession of events for the centennial celebration of Washington's Birthday, Philadelphia, February 1832

George Washington was born on February 11, 1731 (O.S.), at his parents' Pope's Creek Estate near Colonial Beach in Westmoreland County, Virginia, now the George Washington Birthplace National Monument. At the time, the entire British Empire, including its North American possessions, was on the Julian calendar; the Empire, not being bound to the Catholic Church, had not yet adopted the modern Gregorian calendar that Catholic countries had adopted in 1582. Consequently, by the 1730s, the Julian calendar used by Britain and the Colonies was eleven days behind the Gregorian, because of leap year differences. Furthermore, the British civil year began on March 25 rather than January 1, so that dates in February (such as this one) 'belonged' to the preceding year. In 1752, the British Empire switched to the Gregorian calendar; since then, Americans born prior to 1752, including Washington, have typically had their birthdays recognized according to the Gregorian calendar ("New Style" dates). Since February 11, 1731, on the Julian calendar was February 22, 1732, on the Gregorian, and he was alive at the time the change was made, Washington changed his birth date to February 22, 1732, to match the new calendar.

The federal holiday honoring Washington was originally implemented by an Act of Congress in 1879 for government offices in Washington (20 Stat. 277) and expanded in 1885 to include all federal offices (23 Stat. 516). As the first federal holiday to honor an American president, the holiday was celebrated on Washington's birthday under the Gregorian calendar, February 22. (Note: Washington was born on February 11, 1731, based on the Julian calendar then in use in the British Colonies. When the Gregorian calendar was adopted in Great Britain, Ireland and the EMpire (1752), he opted to begin observing his birthday anniversary on the equivalent date of February 22, 1732.) On January 1, 1971, the federal holiday was shifted to the third Monday in February by the Uniform Monday Holiday Act. This places it between February 15 and 21, which makes "Washington's Birthday" something of a misnomer, since it never occurs on Washington's actual birthday, February 22. (A rough analogue of this phenomenon can be seen in Commonwealth realms, where the reigning monarch's official birthday is celebrated without regard to the monarch's actual date of birth.)

The first attempt to create a Presidents Day occurred in 1951 when the President's Day National Committee was formed by Harold Stonebridge Fischer of Compton, California, who became its National Executive Director for the next two decades. The purpose was not to honor any particular president but to honor the office of the presidency. It was first thought that March 4, the original inauguration day, should be deemed Presidents Day, but the bill recognizing March 4 stalled in the Senate Judiciary Committee (which had authority over federal holidays). The committee felt that, given its proximity to Lincoln's and Washington's Birthdays, three holidays so close together would be unduly burdensome. But meanwhile the governors of a majority of the states issued proclamations declaring March 4 Presidents' Day in their respective jurisdictions.

An early draft of the Uniform Monday Holiday Act would have renamed the holiday "Presidents' Day" to honor the birthdays of both Washington and Lincoln, which would explain why the chosen date falls between the two, but this proposal failed in committee, and the bill was voted on and signed into law on June 28, 1968, keeping the name Washington's Birthday.

By the mid-1980s, with a push from advertisers, the term Presidents' Day began its public appearance.

In Washington's adopted hometown of Alexandria, Virginia, celebrations are held throughout February.

== Observance and traditions ==
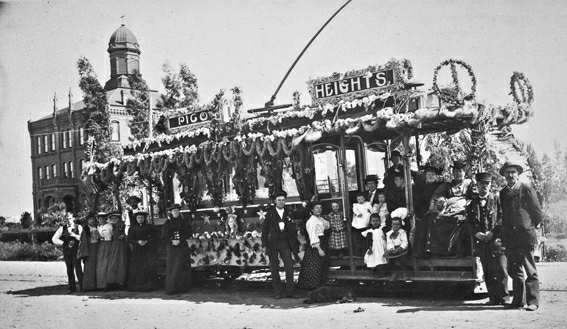
Los Angeles streetcar decorated for Washington's Birthday, c. 1892

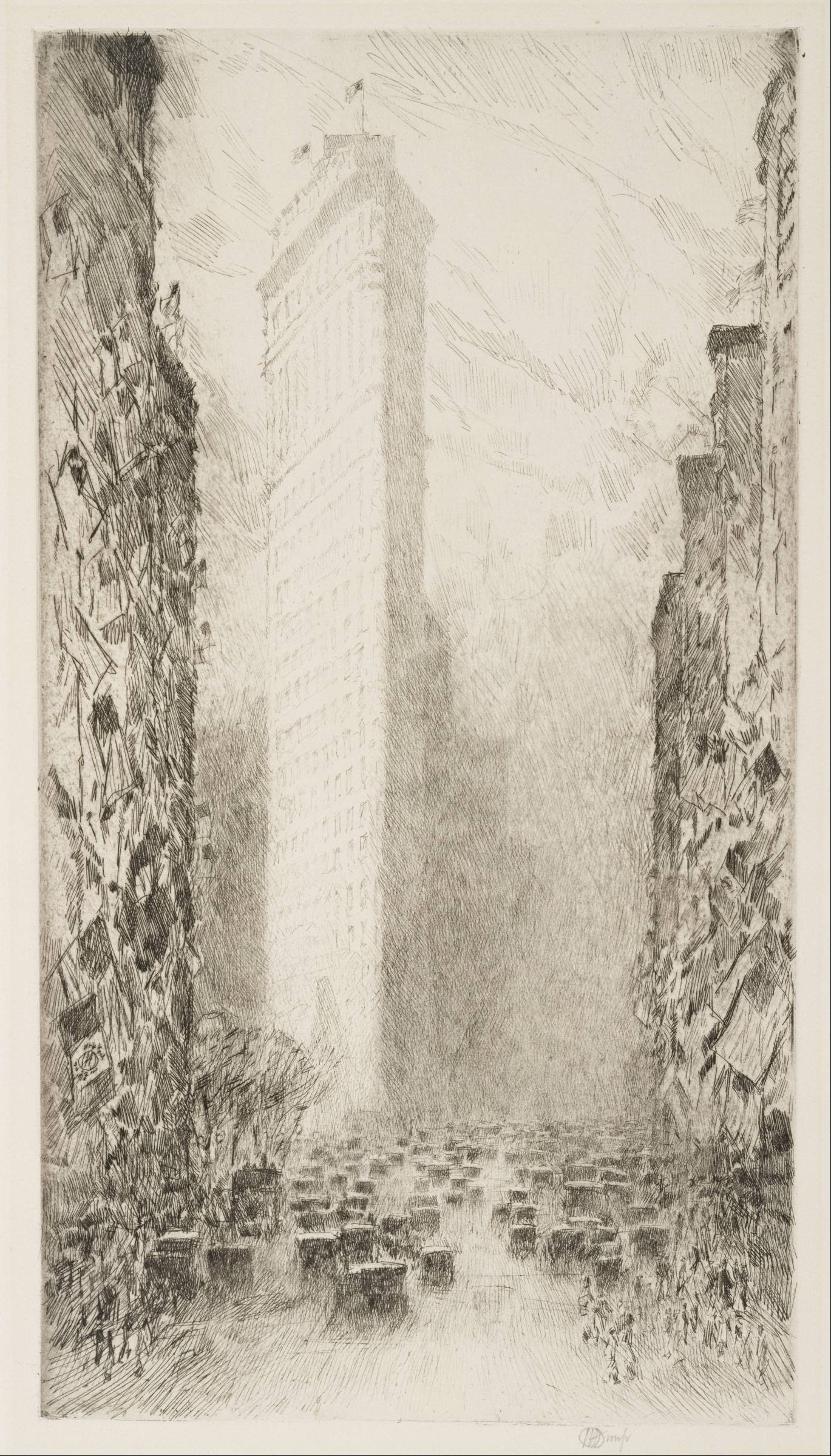
Washington's Birthday—Fifth Avenue at 23rd Street, etching by Childe Hassam, 1916

A food traditionally associated with the holiday is cherry pie, based on the legend of Washington in his youth chopping down a cherry tree.

Until the late 1980s, corporate businesses generally closed on this day, similar to present corporate practices on Memorial Day or Christmas Day. However, after having been moved to the third Monday, most businesses remain open with many offering sales and other promotions. Federal and state government services close (U.S. Postal Service, state Departments of Motor Vehicles, federal and state courts). Class schedules at universities and colleges vary depending on the school. Public elementary and secondary schools are generally closed, but some school districts, such as New York City, may close for an entire week as a "mid-winter recess".

The holiday is also a tribute to the general who created the first military badge of merit for the common soldier. Revived on Washington's 200th birthday in 1932, the Purple Heart medal (which bears Washington's image) is awarded to soldiers who are injured in battle.

Community celebrations often display a lengthy heritage. Laredo, Texas, hosts a monthlong tribute, as does Washington's hometown of Alexandria, Virginia, which includes what is claimed to be the nation's longest-running and largest George Washington Birthday parade. Eustis, Florida, holds an annual GeorgeFest celebration that began in 1902, and in Denver, Colorado, there is a society dedicated to observing the day. At the George Washington Birthplace National Monument in Westmoreland County, Virginia, visitors are treated to birthday celebrations on the holiday, while at Mount Vernon they last throughout the holiday weekend and through February 22.

Since 1862 there has been a tradition in the United States Senate that George Washington's Farewell Address be read on his birthday. Citizens asked that this be done in light of the ongoing Civil War.

=== Commercialism ===
The holiday is well-known for coinciding with deep sales discounts for big ticket items such as appliances, furniture, and especially mattresses. This is due to retailers trying to clear their inventory and taking advantage of tax season. These are typically referred to as President's Day Sales.

=== Sports ===
Since the mid-2000s, the National Basketball Association has held their annual All-Star festivities during the holiday weekend. As a result, no games are played on the holiday itself, and the season resumes the following Thursday.

The day before Presidents Day is the traditional running of the Daytona 500 NASCAR race; there have been occasions when the race was cut short, or either finished on or postponed entirely to the holiday due to inclement weather, the most recent of which was the 2024 edition.

== Punctuation ==
Because "Presidents' Day" is not the official name of the federal holiday, there is variation in how it is rendered, both colloquially and in the name of official state holidays.

When used with the intention of celebrating more than one individual, the form "Presidents' Day" celebrates all presidents individually (therefore, George Washington's Day and Zachary Taylor's Day and Woodrow Wilson's Day). In recent years, as the use of attributive nouns (nouns acting as modifiers) has become more widespread, the form "Presidents Day" has also become common (celebrating Presidents Washington through Trump collectively) in honoring the whole concept of presidents; the Associated Press Stylebook, most newspapers and some magazines use this form.

"President's Day" as an alternate rendering is to honor any one particular president, or for the purpose of commemorating the presidency as an institution. This use of a possessive is the legal rendering in eight states.

== Dates ==
Year								Presidents' Day
1994	2000	2005	2011		2022	2028	2033	February 21 (week 8)
1995		2006	2012	2017	2023		2034	February 20 (week 8)
1996	2001	2007		2018	2024	2029	2035	February 19 (week 8)
	2002	2008	2013	2019		2030	2036	February 18 (week 7)
1997	2003		2014	2020	2025	2031		February 17 (week 7)
1998	2004	2009	2015		2026	2032	2037	February 16 (week 7)
1999		2010	2016	2021	2027		2038	February 15 (week 7)

== See also ==
- List of memorials to George Washington
- National First Ladies Day
- Jefferson's Birthday
- Lincoln's Birthday
- Family Day (Canada)
- Historical rankings of presidents of the United States
