= Jefferson's Birthday =

Public holiday in the United States

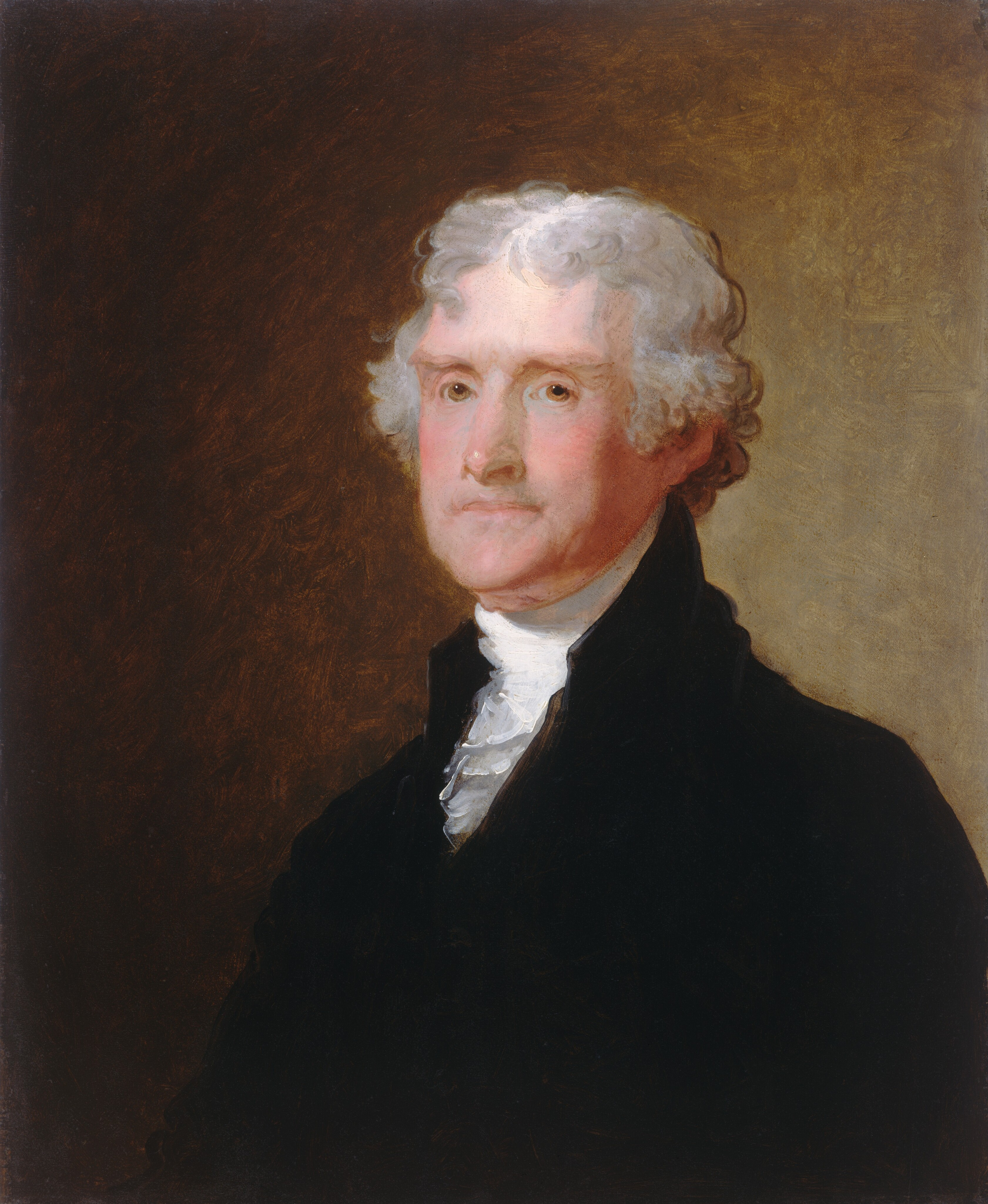
- Observed by: United States
- Date: April 13
- Next time: April 13, 2027
- Frequency: annual

Jefferson's Birthday officially honors the birth of the Founding Father and third U.S. president, Thomas Jefferson on April 13, 1743. This day was recognized by Franklin D. Roosevelt as part of Presidential Proclamation 2276, issued on March 21, 1938.

President George W. Bush issued proclamation 8124 on April 11, 2007, stating that "... on Thomas Jefferson Day, we commemorate the birthday of a monumental figure whose place in our Nation’s history will always be cherished".

== See also ==
- Washington's Birthday
- Lincoln's Birthday
