= Public holidays in Spain =

Public holidays celebrated in Spain include a mix of religious (Roman Catholic), national and regional observances. Each municipality is allowed to have a maximum of 14 public holidays per year; a maximum of nine of these are chosen by the national government and at least two are chosen locally, including patronal festivals.

If one of the "national holidays" happens to fall on a Sunday the regional governments — the autonomous communities of Spain — can choose an alternate holiday or they can allow local authorities to choose. In practice, except for holidays falling on a Sunday, the regional governments can choose up to three holidays per year; or they can choose fewer to allow for more options at the local level.

Since 2010, Ceuta and Melilla, both autonomous cities of Spain, have declared the Muslim holiday of Eid al-Adha or Feast of the Sacrifice, as an official public holiday. It was the first time a non-Christian religious festival has been officially celebrated in Spain since the Reconquista.

When a holiday falls on a Tuesday or Thursday some workers take a day off (the Monday or the Friday) to make a four-day long weekend known as a puente ("bridge").

== Spanish holidays 2026 ==
The following table lists the holidays for the year 2026:

| | | | | Autonomous communities | | | | | | | | | | | | | | | | | Autonomous cities | |
| Date | English name | Native name | Notes | (Andalusia) | (Aragon) | (Castile and León) | (Castilla–La Mancha) | (Canary Islands) | (Catalonia) | (Extremadura) | (Galicia (Spain)) | (Balearic Islands) | (La Rioja) | (Community of Madrid) | (Region of Murcia) | (Navarre) | (Asturias) | (Basque Country (autonomous community)) | (Cantabria) | (Valencian Community) | (Ceuta) | (Melilla) |
|---|---|---|---|---|---|---|---|---|---|---|---|---|---|---|---|---|---|---|---|---|---|---|
| 1 January | New Year's Day | Año Nuevo | | check | check | check | check | check | check | check | check | check | check | check | check | check | check | check | check | check | check | check |
| 6 January | Epiphany | Epifanía del Señor | | check | check | check | check | check | check | check | check | check | check | check | check | check | check | check | check | check | check | check |
| 17 February | Shrove Tuesday | Martes de Carnaval | | | | | | | | check | | | | | | | | | | | | |
| 28 February | Andalusia Day | Día de Andalucía | | check | | | | | | | | | | | | | | | | | | |
| 1 March | Day of the Balearic Islands | Dia de las Islas Baleares | | | | | | | | | | check | | | | | | | | | | |
| 19 March | Saint Joseph's Day | San José | | | | | | | | | | | | check | | | | | | | | |
| 20 March | Eid al-Fitr | Ruptura del Ayuno | Variable Islamic | | | | | | | | | | | | | | | | | | check | check |
| 2 April | Maundy Thursday | Jueves Santo | | check | check | check | check | check | | check | check | check | check | check | check | check | check | check | check | | check | check |
| 3 April | Good Friday | Viernes Santo | | check | check | check | check | check | check | check | check | check | check | check | check | check | check | check | check | check | check | check |
| 6 April | Easter Monday | Lunes de Pascua | | | | | check | | check | | | check | check | | | check | | check | | check | | |
| 23 April | National Day of Aragon | Día de San Jorge o Diya Nazional d’Aragón | Patronage festivity | | check | | | | | | | | | | | | | | | | | |
| 23 April | Castile and León Day | Día de Castilla y León | Historical account | | | check | | | | | | | | | | | | | | | | |
| 1 May | Labour Day | Día del Trabajador | | check | check | check | check | check | check | check | check | check | check | check | check | check | check | check | check | check | check | check |
| 2 May | Madrid Day | Fiesta de la Comunidad de Madrid | | | | | | | | | | | | check | | | | | | | | |
| 17 May | Galician Literature Day | Día de las Letras Gallegas | | | | | | | | | check | | | | | | | | | | | |
| 27 May | Eid al-Adha | Celebración del Sacrificio | Variable Islamic | | | | | | | | | | | | | | | | | | check | check |
| 30 May | Day of the Canary Islands | Día de Canarias | | | | | | check | | | | | | | | | | | | | | |
| 31 May | Castilla-La Mancha Day | Día de Castilla-La Mancha | | | | | check | | | | | | | | | | | | | | | |
| 4 June | Feast of Corpus Christi | Corpus Christi | | | | | check | | | | | | | | | | | | | | | |
| 9 June | Regional Day | Día de la Región de Murcia | Statute-of-Autonomy commemoration | | | | | | | | | | | | check | | | | | | | |
| 9 June | Regional Day | Día de La Rioja | Statute-of-Autonomy commemoration | | | | | | | | | | check | | | | | | | | | |
| 13 June | St. Anthony's Day | San Antonio | | | | | | | | | | | | | | | | | | | check | |
| 24 June | John the Baptist | San Juan | | | | | | check | | | | | | | | | | | | check | check | |
| 25 July | National Day of Galicia | Santiago Apóstol o Día da Patria Galega | Patronage festivity | | | | | | | | check | | | | | | | | | | | |
| 28 July | Cantabria Institutions Day | Día de las Instituciones de Cantabria | | | | | | | | | | | | | | | | | check | | | |
| 5 August | Santa Maria of Africa | Santa María de África | | | | | | | | | | | | | | | | | | | check | |
| 15 August | Assumption | Asunción | | check | check | check | check | check | check | check | check | check | check | check | check | check | check | check | check | check | check | check |
| 16 August | San Roque | San Roque | | | | | | | | | check | | | | | | | | | | | |
| 2 September | Ceuta Day | Día de Ceuta | | | | | | | | | | | | | | | | | | | check | |
| 8 September | Regional Day | Día de Asturias | Patronage festivity | | | | | | | | | | | | | | check | | | | | |
| 8 September | Regional Day | Día de Extremadura | Patronage festivity | | | | | | | check | | | | | | | | | | | | |
| 11 September | National Day of Catalonia | Diada Nacional de Catalunya | Historical account | | | | | | check | | | | | | | | | | | | | |
| 15 September | Our Lady of the “Bien Aparecida” | La Bien Aparecida | Customs-and-traditions exaltation | | | | | | | | | | | | | | | | check | | | |
| 17 September | Municipal Day | Día de Melilla | Historical account | | | | | | | | | | | | | | | | | | | check |
| 9 October | Day of the Valencian Community | Dia de la Comunitat Valenciana | Historical account | | | | | | | | | | | | | | | | | check | | |
| 12 October | National Day | Fiesta Nacional de España | Historical account | check | check | check | check | check | check | check | check | check | check | check | check | check | check | check | check | check | check | check |
| 25 October | Basque National Day | Euskadi Eguna | Statute-of-Autonomy commemoration | | | | | | | | | | | | | | | check | | | | |
| 1 November | All Saints' Day | Día de todos los Santos | | check | check | check | check | check | check | check | check | check | check | check | check | check | check | check | check | check | check | check |
| 6 December | Constitution Day | Día de la Constitución Española | | check | check | check | check | check | check | check | check | check | check | check | check | check | check | check | check | check | check | check |
| 8 December | Immaculate Conception | Inmaculada Concepción | | check | check | check | check | check | check | check | check | check | check | check | check | check | check | check | check | check | check | check |
| 20 December | Aragon Justice Day | Día del Justicia de Aragón | Tribute to the historical figure of Juan de Lanuza y Urrea, who was beheaded for defending the rights and freedoms of the Aragonese people | | check | | | | | | | | | | | | | | | | | |
| 25 December | Christmas Day | Navidad | | check | check | check | check | check | check | check | check | check | check | check | check | check | check | check | check | check | check | check |
| 26 December | Saint Stephen's Day | Sant Esteve | | | | | | | check | | | | | | | | | | | | | |
| Total holidays | | | | 13 | 14 | 13 | 13 | 12 | 13 | 13 | 14 | 13 | 13 | 13 | 13 | 12 | 13 | 13 | 13 | 13 | 16 | 14 |
