= Uniform Monday Holiday Act =

1968 United States law regarding federal holidays

- Long title: An Act to provide for uniform annual observances of certain legal public holidays on Mondays, and for other purposes.
- Enacted by: the 90th United States Congress
- Effective: January 1, 1971

Citations
- Public law: Pub. L. 90–363
- Statutes at Large: 82 Stat. 250

Codification
- Titles amended: 5 U.S.C. § 6103

Legislative history
- Introduced in the House as H.R. 15951 on March 13, 1968; Committee consideration by House Committee on the Judiciary; Passed the House on May 9, 1968; Passed the Senate on June 24, 1968; Signed into law by President Lyndon B. Johnson on June 28, 1968

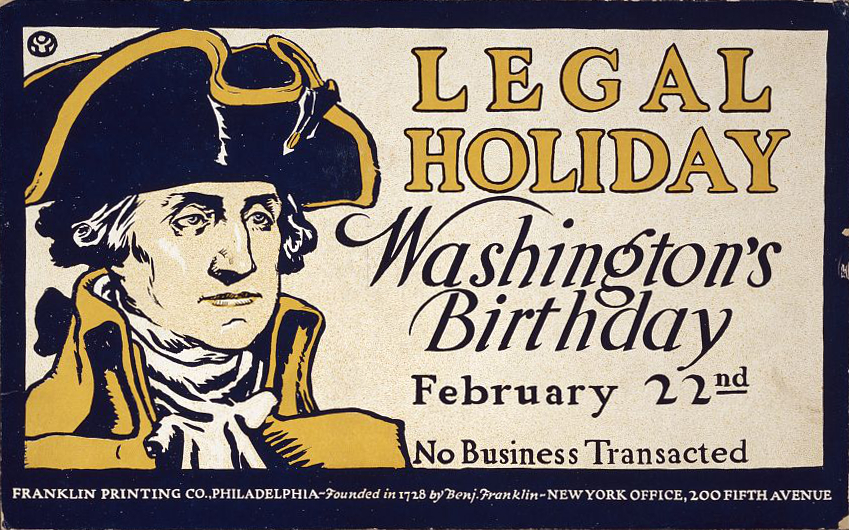
An 1890s poster showing Washington's Birthday as February 22, the date on which it always fell before being changed by the Uniform Monday Holiday Act.

The Uniform Monday Holiday Act (Pub. L. 90–363, 82 Stat. 250, enacted June 28, 1968) is an Act of Congress that permanently moved two federal holidays in the United States to a Monday, being Washington's Birthday and Memorial Day, and further made Columbus Day a federal holiday, also permanently on a Monday. This created long weekends with three days off ending with the holidays, such as Memorial Day Weekend.

Veterans Day was moved from November 11 to the fourth Monday in October, but in 1978, it was returned to November 11, the actual date of the end of World War I and celebrated in several European countries as Armistice Day.

The Act was signed into law on June 1, 1968, and took effect on January 1, 1971.

== Background ==
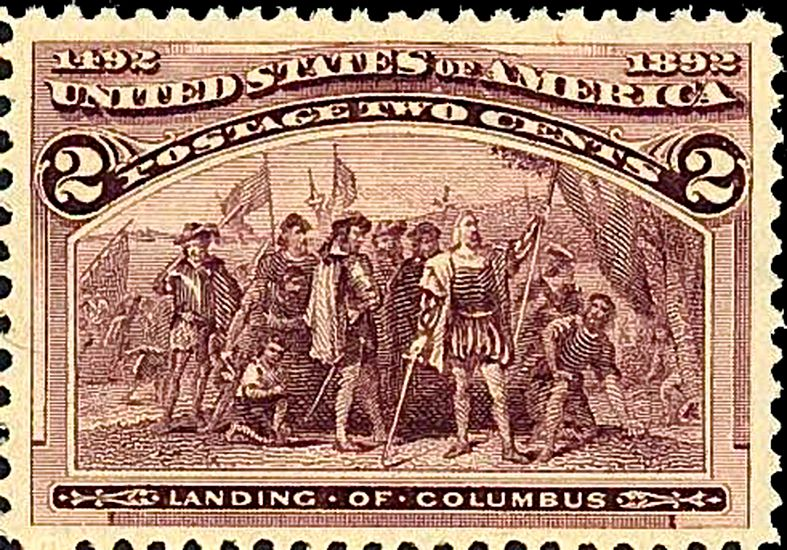
US stamp commemorating the quadricentennial of the landing of Christopher Columbus.

The Act was designed to increase the number of long weekends for federal employees, a favorite goal of the travel industry. Veterans Day was removed from this list of "always-on-Monday" holidays when it was moved back to its traditional date of November 11, by act of Congress in 1975, effective 1978.

This Act did not officially change the name of Washington's Birthday to Presidents Day, nor did it combine Washington's Birthday with Lincoln's Birthday, despite suggestions that those two changes be made. Many US states have adopted some version of the Presidents Day name. The perception that the name was changed stems from the fact that the act placed federal observance of Washington's Birthday in the week of February 15 to 21 and, since that week always falls between Lincoln's birthday (February 12) and Washington's (February 22), but never includes either date, popular references have given rise to the title, which recognizes both Presidents. As of 1998, a dozen U.S. states officially refer to the holiday as "Presidents' Day." Lincoln's Birthday holiday with very limited exceptions is no longer observed at all, at least on its actual date, though some states combine it with Washington's Birthday.

Though the holiday was not in existence at the time, Martin Luther King Jr.'s birthday, which was established in 1983 and first observed in 1986, is celebrated on the third Monday in January, which falls on January 15–21, instead of King's actual birth date, January 15, for the same reasons.

== Effects ==
The Monday holiday dates this act established were:

- Washington's Birthday: third Monday in February (formerly February 22)
- Memorial Day: last Monday in May (formerly May 30)
- Columbus Day: second Monday in October (previously observed only in some states on October 12)
- Veterans Day: fourth Monday in October (was November 11 prior to the act and returned to November 11 in 1978)

Also celebrated on Monday:

- Martin Luther King Jr. Day: third Monday in January (first observed as a federal holiday in 1986)
- Labor Day: first Monday in September (first observed as a federal holiday in 1894. Already observed on a Monday prior to this Act)

== See also ==
- Happy Monday System – similar legislation in Japan
- Holiday economics – similar policy in the Philippines
- Title 5 of the United States Code
- Title 36 of the United States Code
