= Puente (holiday) =

Spanish term for taking a day off to join two holidays

A puente (Spanish for bridge) is a holiday in Spain. It is a day off to bridge the time between the weekend and a holiday, thereby creating a long weekend. A puente typically occurs when a holiday falls on a Tuesday or Thursday, workers will then take the Monday or Friday as a puente, a day off. Some businesses will close down altogether.

In 2012, the Spanish government led by Mariano Rajoy, as it was faced with the eurozone crisis, initiated measures to move public holidays to Mondays and Fridays. The aim of the measure was to avoid puentes. Gayle Allard, an economist at IE Business School, has said that the measure can improve productivity. The Spanish Catholic Church opposed the measure, which would shuffle the day of the Feast of the Immaculate Conception.

	December
Mo	Tu	We	Th	Fr	Sa	Su
			1	2	3	4
5	6	7	8	9	10	11
12	13	14	15	16	17	18
19	20	21	22	23	24	25
26	27	28	29	30	31
In 2022, the December holidays were 3, 4, 6, 8, 10, 11, 17, 18, 24, 25, 26, 31 and 1 January 2023
2022

In some years, such as 2022, December 6 (Constitution Day) falls on a Tuesday and December 8 (feast of the Immaculate Conception) falls on a Thursday. Thus, a period of 9 consecutive days has only three work days. Some workers take a very long weekend by asking just one, two or three days off. Such multiple puentes are sometimes called acueductos ("aqueducts", keeping the metaphor) or macropuentes ("macro-bridges")

== See also ==
- Kokumin no kyūjitsu. Japanese law stipulates that if there is only one non-holiday in between two public holidays, that day should become an additional holiday, known as a Kokumin no kyūjitsu (lit. Citizens' Holiday).
