= Dia de la Comunitat Valenciana =

Valencian celebration on 9 October

9 d'Octubre
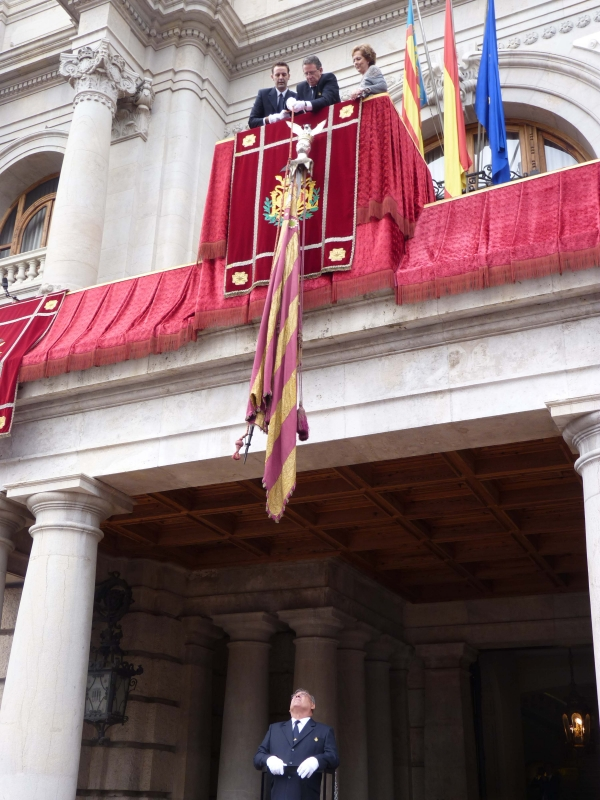
- Traditional 9 d'Octubre flag lowering of the Senyera Coronada in Valencia
- Date: 9 October
- Location: Valencian Community, Spain

9 d'Octubre (English: October 9th) is a historical celebration in the Valencian Community, the official day of the Valencian Autonomous Community since its recognition as an Autonomus Community of Spain. It commemorates the conquest of the city of Balansiya (modern Valencia) by the troops of James I of Aragon and the creation of the Kingdom of Valencia in 1238.

== Background ==
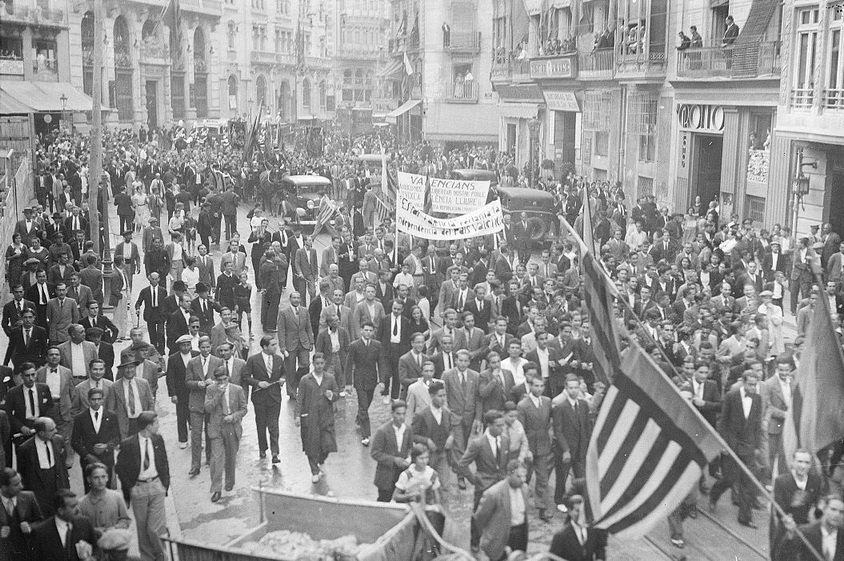
Civic procession in Valencia in the year 1933. In the image, people are wearing Valencian flags and some people wearing banners supporting Valencian nationalism

The celebration was created by James II of Aragon in the XIV century, mainly inside of the city of Valencia. Due its antiquity and popular tradition, the date was considered as the Valencian National Day by the Board of Trade Unions and Political Forces of Valencia in 1976, and by the Plenary of members of the parliament of Valencia in 1977. Finally, with the creation of the Valencian Community in 1982, it was made a Public holiday as the Valencian Community Day and is celebrated in the entire Valencian Community.

Celebrations on October 9th offer many activities such as an international fireworks contest, popular medieval markets, traditional Moors and Christians parades, band concerts and prize awards to relevant celebrities. A formal institutional ceremony with all local authorities is the so called civilian procession held to honour the old royal flag Senyera Coronada towards the Cathedral from the Town City Hall, where it descends through the balcony and not through the main door as a proud sign of not bowing in front of anyone but God. This parade takes place since 1338 when Peter IV of Aragon intended to celebrate the centenary of the Kingdom of Valencia and to demand protection to Saint Denis in the middle of a famine caused by poor rains. Sant Donis, as it is called in the local language, is also the Lovers' Day on October 9th in the Valencian Community similar to St.Valentine's, and it is customary to give marzipans shaped as fruits and horticultural products as a present to a beloved person. These sweet gifts are known as La Mocadorà, being mocador the Valencian word for a silk handkerchief, where the marzipan vegetables and fruits are gift-wrapped. All bakeries along the city and the old kingdom of Valencia hold nowadays beautiful handycrafted and sweet shop window and product contests with this theme Mocadorà and its orchard marzipans.
