= Mocadorada =

Valencian tradition

Mocadorà
- Part of Dia de la Comunitat Valenciana
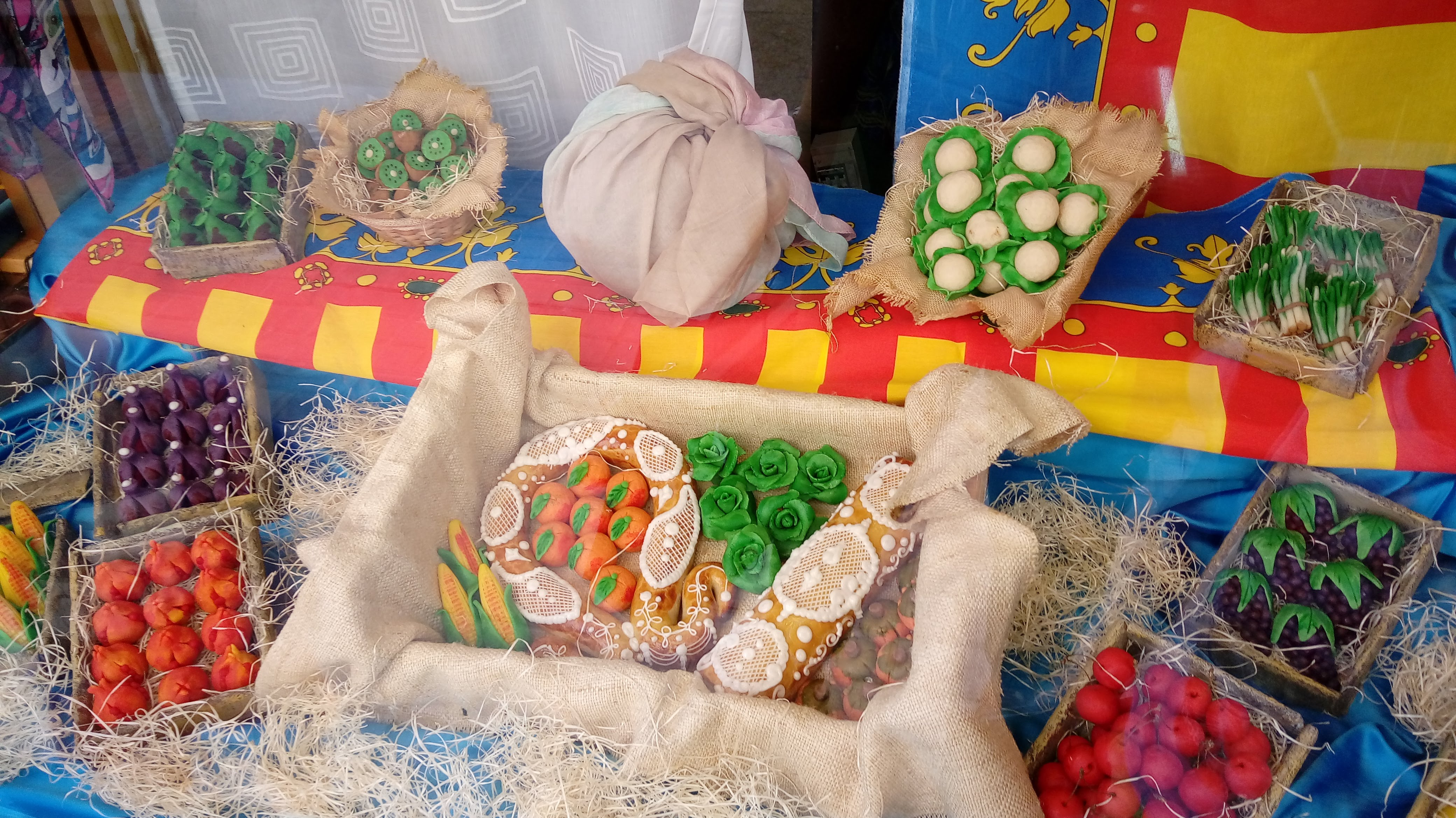
- Bakery storefront decorated for October 9. The marzipan fruits are displayed alongside the Valencian flag.

Mocadorada (also known as Mocadorà, from the word Mocador, the Valencian word for handkerchief), is a tradition from the Valencian Community celebrated each October 9, concurring with the Day of the Valencian Community (Spain). It consists of a collection of frutta martorana where the marzipan fruits are held inside of a handkerchief.

The mocadorà takes part of Saint Denis festivities in the Valencian Community, being considered both the Lover's day and the National Day, being also a Public Holiday since 1982. As part of the Lover's day celebrations, the tradition states that the mocadorà is given as a present to a beloved person.
