= Holiday economics =

Moved observances as per the holiday economics policy: (Note: Dates are fictional and for illustrative purposes) 17th day (Wednesday) – "unmovable"/fixed holiday 4th day (Thursday) → 1st day (Nearest Monday) 28th (Sunday) → 29th (Nearest Monday (Note: "If the holiday falls on a Sunday, the holiday will be observed on the Monday that follows" – Sec. 26, c (Republic Act No.9492))) 26th day (Friday) – holiday date vary per year regardless of law (green outline box) 25th day (Friday) – movable holiday but observance not moved as per prerogative (yellow circle background)

Philippine holiday economics refers to the policy in the Philippines introduced by President Gloria Macapagal Arroyo to move the observance of certain public holidays to the nearest weekend.

== Background ==
=== 2007–2011: Introduction and temporary suspension ===
The Executive Order 292, or the National Administrative Code of 1987 defines several of the public national holidays in the Philippines. There are two types of public holidays in the Philippines – regular and special non-working holidays. Schools in all levels suspend classes regardless of the public holidays while employers may or may not require workers to report to work.

Those who would have report to work if not for the holiday but did not render work are paid their regular rate. Employees required to work due to their nature of their work are paid extra of their daily rate and cost of living daily allowance depending if the holiday is a regular (200%) or a special non-working holiday (130%). If a holiday falls on a non-working day for the employee, the employee is not compensated.

President Gloria Macapagal Arroyo signed Proclamation No. 1211 in January 2007 declaring Independence Day which falls on June 12 a working holiday, and the day before a non-working holiday – effectively moving the holiday. However rites organized by the government remained observed on the actual date.

She would sign into law Republic Act 9492 the Holiday Economics Law on July 24, 2007 which allows the observance of otherwise fixed public holidays except for New Year's Day on January 1, All Saint's Day on November 1, Christmas Day on December 25, and the last day of the year, December 31 to the nearest Monday. The Senate bill of the law was introduced by Senator Joker Arroyo. The measure was enacted in a bid to boost domestic tourism.

Arroyo's successor, Benigno Aquino III would retain the policy in his first few months in office until Proclamation 82, signed on December 20, 2010, became effective in January 2011 resulting from an opposition of the business sector to the policy due to extra costs associated on paying workers extra wage on public holidays and the president has the "prerogative" to move or retain the movable holidays specified on Republic Act 9492, temporarily suspending it for 11 years until the administration of Bongbong Marcos on November 11, 2022.

=== 2022–present: Return after suspension ===
President Bongbong Marcos restored Arroyo's holiday economics policy after its 11-year suspension by issuing Proclamation No. 90 in November 2022 which concerns the observance of public holidays for 2023. This was enacted as a means to boost the domestic tourism industry which was impacted by the COVID-19 pandemic and related lockdowns.

== Movement of holiday observances ==
The holiday economics law does not move the actual dates of the holidays but rather "rationalizes" the observance of it by moving its observance to the nearest weekend (Monday). This would prevent holidays in the middle of weekdays and would create long weekends.

Holidays explicitly mentioned in Republic Act No. 9492
Holiday	Date	Observance
New Year's Day	January 1	
Maundy Thursday	Varies annually (Movable date (Note: "Movable date" is a term which appears in Republic Act No. 9492. Not to be confused with holidays with observance that can be moved via said law.))	
Good Friday	Varies annually (Movable date)	
Eidul Fitr	Varies annually (Movable date)	
Araw ng Kagitingan (Day of Valor)	April 9	Nearest Monday
Labor Day	May 1	Nearest Monday
Independence Day	June 12	Nearest Monday
Ninoy Aquino Day (special holiday)	August 21	Nearest Monday
National Heroes Day	Last Monday of August	
All Saints' Day (special holiday)	November 1	
Bonifacio Day	November 30	Nearest Monday
Christmas Day	December 25	
Rizal Day	December 30	Nearest Monday
Last Day of the Year (special holiday)	December 31	

=== Example ===
The implementation of holiday economics for the year 2008. Public holiday/moved observance Original date of holiday observances moved (with arrow) Holidays with variable date annually — Maundy Thursday, Good Friday, National Heroes Day (last Monday of August), and Eidul Fitr (green outline box) Movable holidays – unimplemented/unmoved as per prerogative (yellow circle background) December 26 and 29 are likewise declared "Additional special (non-working) day"

== See also ==
- Happy Monday System – similar policy in Japan
- Uniform Monday Holiday Act – similar legislation in the United States
