= Washington's Birthday Celebration =

Celebration in Laredo, Texas

Coordinates: 27°32′40″N 99°28′17″W

- Genre: Rock Alternative; Spanish rock Tejano
- Dates: Annually; Mid January to End of February
- Locations: Laredo, Webb County, Texas
- Years active: 1898–present
- Website: wbcalaredo.org

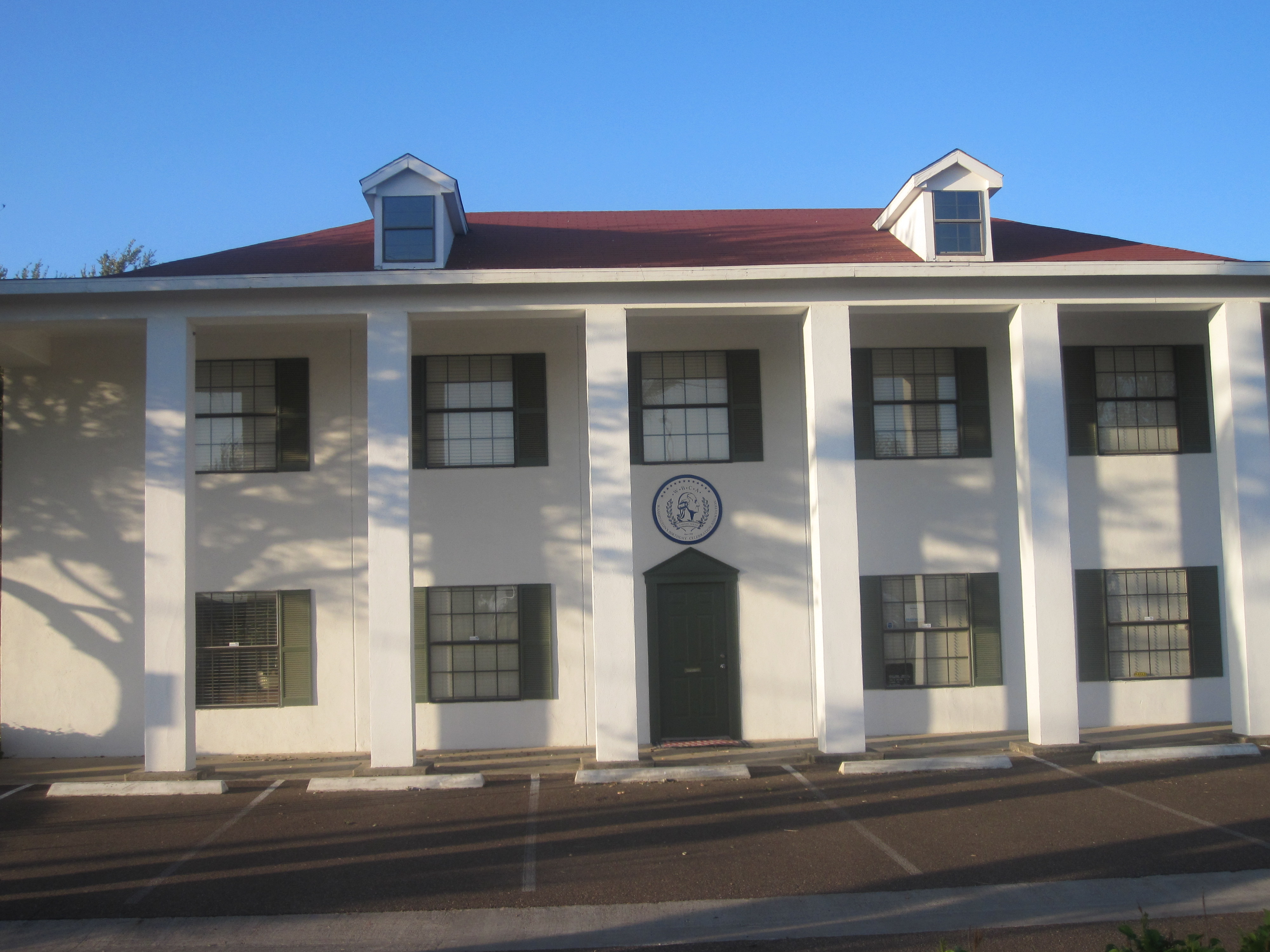
The Washington Birthday Celebration Building in Laredo is designed to loosely resemble Mount Vernon.

The Washington's Birthday Celebration (WBCA) is an almost month-long event held each February in Laredo, the seat of Webb County in south Texas, that celebrates the birthday of George Washington. It is the largest celebration of its kind in the United States with approximately 400,000 attendees annually. The celebration consists of various festivals; a Society of Martha Washington Colonial Pageant and Ball, Princess Pocahontas Pageant and Ball, two parades, a carnival, an air show, fireworks, live concerts, "Fun-Fest" at Laredo Community College, and a citywide prom during which many of the Laredo elite dress in Colonial attire. Each year a prominent Laredo man and woman play the roles of George and Martha Washington. One of its main events, the Jalapeño Festival, has recently been named one of Top 10 eating festivals in the United States.

== History ==
The celebration was first staged in 1898 by the San Antonio-based Improved Order of Red Men, which established the Laredo local chapter called Yaqui Tribe #59. Much earlier, former Laredo Mayor Samuel M. Jarvis (1822–1893), had held a reception at his downtown home in honor of Washington's birthday and had encouraged a larger celebration thereafter, which he never lived to see. Jarvis was a Republican who had earlier fought in the Mexican War under General Zachary Taylor.

That original celebration is considered to have been a phenomenal success. In 1923, the association received its state charter. In 1924, the celebration featured its first Colonial Pageant, with thirteen girls from Laredo, representing the Thirteen Colonies. The WBCA has become a Laredo institution, with its history closely tied to the history of the community.

In 1962, the WBA president was Honoré Ligarde, a lawyer-banker who later that year was elected to the Texas House of Representatives for Webb County to succeed Vidal M. Treviño, long-term superintendent of the Laredo Independent School District.

The 2016 celebration began on January 21 with the Commander's Reception at the Laredo Energy Arena. The 28-event festival will extend for thirty-three days through February 22, Washington's traditional birthday. Festival president Dr. Joe Castellano compared the celebration to "the Super Bowl, Miss America, and the Academy Awards all rolled up into one. We truly feel that our border town becomes the center of the universe; all thanks to the teamwork from our enthusiastic members, loyal sponsors, countless volunteers and the community of Laredo."

For the first time in its 124-year history, the celebration was cancelled in 2021 due to health concerns stemming from the COVID-19 pandemic. As a result, GeorgeFest in Eustis, Florida, now holds the title of longest running celebration of George Washington's Birthday in the United States of America.

== Jalapeño Festival ==
Established in 1978 as part of Washington's Birthday Celebration and sponsored by La Costeña the Jalapeño festival includes concerts, the Miss Jalapeño contest, and the La Costeña Jalapeño Eating Contest which determines who can eat the most jalapeños in 15 minutes with the record being 266 according to the official count. The contest is separate from the Major League Eating La Costeña Jalapeño Challenges that have been held. 2018 marked the 40th year and had 21,000 people attend, which is above the averages of 13,000 to 14,000 people.
