= Long weekend =

Weekend that is at least three days long

A long weekend is a weekend that is at least three days long (i.e. a three-day weekend), due to a public or unofficial holiday occurring on either the following Monday or the preceding Friday.

Many countries also have four-day weekends, in which two days adjoining the weekend are holidays. Examples are Good Friday / Easter Monday, and Christmas Day / Boxing Day (e.g. when Christmas Day occurs on a Thursday or Monday).

== Four-day "bridge" weekends ==
In many countries, when a lone holiday occurs on a Tuesday or a Thursday, the day between the holiday and the weekend may also be designated as a holiday, set to be a movable or floating holiday, or work/school may be interrupted by consensus unofficially. This is typically referred to by a phrase involving "bridge" in many languages; for example in some Spanish-speaking countries the term is puente ("bridge") or simply "fin de semana largo".

Four-day bridge weekends are commonplace in non-English speaking countries, but there are only a couple of examples in English-speaking countries:

In the United States, the fourth Thursday of November is Thanksgiving, a public holiday on which most workplaces are closed; many workplaces remain closed the following day to create a four-day weekend.

In Melbourne, Australia, the Melbourne Cup holiday is held on a Tuesday. The Monday is not a public holiday, but many people modify their work arrangements to also have the Monday off and many schools will have a "pupil free day", so it is colloquially referred to as the "Cup Day long weekend".

== Europe ==
In Flanders, the Dutch-speaking part of Belgium, "brugdag" ("bridge" day) is used. In the Netherlands also "Klemdag" is used.

In France, a bridge idiom is used: faire le pont ("to make the bridge") is used to mean taking additional holiday days. For example, if there is already an official holiday on Thursday, one could "faire le pont" on the Friday and thus have a four-day weekend (Thursday through Sunday inclusive).

In Germany and Switzerland, a bridge-related term is also used: a day taken off from work to fill the gap between a holiday Thursday (or Tuesday) and the weekend is called a Brückentag ("bridge day"), whereas in Austria it is called a Fenstertag ("window day").

Italians use the idiom Fare il ponte: literally, "make the bridge". This could be a Thursday–Sunday weekend if the bridge was over Friday, or a Saturday–Tuesday weekend if the bridge was over a Monday.

In Norway, the term "oval weekend" (oval helg in Norwegian) is used. An ordinary weekend is conceived of as "round" (although this is not stated explicitly), and adding extra days off makes it "oval". Norwegians also refer to "inneklemte" (squeezed in) days, which are between a public holiday and a weekend. This is typical for the Friday after Ascension Day, which always falls on a Thursday. It is common not to work on such days, so as to be able to extend the weekend to four days.

In Poland, long weekends occur several times a year. The term długi weekend (long weekend) is commonly used in the Polish language. As well as the Easter weekend and the Christmas weekend, there is Corpus Christi weekend (Corpus Christi is always on Thursday and people usually take Friday off as well) and it may occur also around other holidays. However, the best-known long weekend is at the beginning of May, when there are holidays of Labour Day on May 1 and 3 May Constitution Day. The weekend can in fact be up to 9 days long (April 28 – May 6) and, taking one to three days off work, Poles often go for short holidays then.

Portugal also uses the bridge idiom with the Portuguese word ponte.

In Slovenian, the term podaljšan vikend ("prolonged weekend") is used for a three-day weekend. Four-day weekends also happen, because May 1 and May 2 are public holidays (both May Day). A peculiar coincidence are Christmas Day and Independence Day, falling on two consecutive dates.

In the United Kingdom, where the majority of public holidays are termed "bank holidays" by statute, five of the eight public holidays in England and Wales always fall on a Monday or a Friday. When a fixed-date holiday in the UK falls on a weekend, the next weekday is normally designated as a substitute holiday. As such, bank holidays normally form an extension of the weekend and are known as "bank holiday weekends": terminology which is also common in some Commonwealth countries and the Republic of Ireland. There is, however, no automatic entitlement to time off on a bank holiday under British labour laws, and thus not everyone benefits from long weekends. If an employee is entitled to time off on a bank holiday, it may count towards their 5.6 weeks-equivalent of statutory annual leave, though many companies offer bank holidays as an addition to employees' contracted annual leave entitlement.

In Spain, the bridge becomes a macropuente when the anniversary of the Spanish Constitution of 1978 (December 6) and the Feast of the Immaculate Conception (December 8) fall on a Tuesday and Thursday, respectively.

In Sweden, a day between a weekend and a bank holiday is called a klämdag ("squeeze day"). Many Swedes take a vacation day to have a long weekend.

== Middle East ==
In Israel, a "bridge" metaphor is also used: yom gesher ("יום גשר", literally "bridge day").

In Iran, the Arabic term beyn-ot-ta'tileyn ("بین التعطیلین"), which means "between two holidays," is used.

== North America ==
In the United States, the Uniform Monday Holiday Act officially moved federal government observances of many holidays to Mondays, largely at the behest of the travel industry. The resulting long weekends are often termed "three-day weekends" as a result. A well-known four-day weekend starts with Thanksgiving and Black Friday after.

== South America ==
In Argentina, some national holidays that occur on a Tuesday, Wednesday, Thursday or Friday (sometimes even on a Saturday) are officially moved to the closest Monday in order to create a long weekend.

In Brazil, when a holiday occurs in a Tuesday or a Thursday, some sectors of the society, as government and education, turn the day between the holiday and the weekend into a holiday. The four-day or even the three-day weekends are called in Brazilian Portuguese feriados prolongados ("Extended holidays") or its popular form feriadão ("big holiday"). The bridge day is usually called "imprensado" ("pressed (in between)") or "enforcado" ("hanged"). To some extent, the term "ponte" is also used. One could also use the verb emendar (splice), saying eu vou emendar o feriado e o fim de semana ("I will splice together the holiday and the weekend.")

In Chile, a "sandwich" is a day that falls between two holidays, independently of whether it's a holiday by itself or not. In the latter case, workers may take it off on account on vacation days, an action called "tomarse el sandwich" (lit.: "taking the sandwich"). In formal writings, the term "interferiado" is used instead of "sandwich". In colloquial contexts, these days, almost always a Monday or a Friday, may be called "San Lunes" or "San Viernes" (lit.: "Saint Monday" and "Saint Friday", respectively) as well.

== Asia ==
In Indonesia, when a non holiday occurs between two holidays or one of them is a weekend, is colloquially termed "Harpitnas" ('Hari Kejepit Nasional') (lit. National Clamped/Pinched Day, a play on Hardiknas, National Education Day) causing some institutions to declare a day off, or some students or employees unilaterally declaring a day off for themselves, thereby creating a long weekend.

In Japan, a weekday which falls between two public holidays is legally a public holiday.

== See also ==
- Four-day workweek
- Holiday economics
- List of countries by number of public holidays
- List of holidays by country
- Public holiday
- The Long Week-End
