= Lincoln's Birthday =

Holiday celebrating Abraham Lincoln's birthday

Abraham Lincoln's Birthday
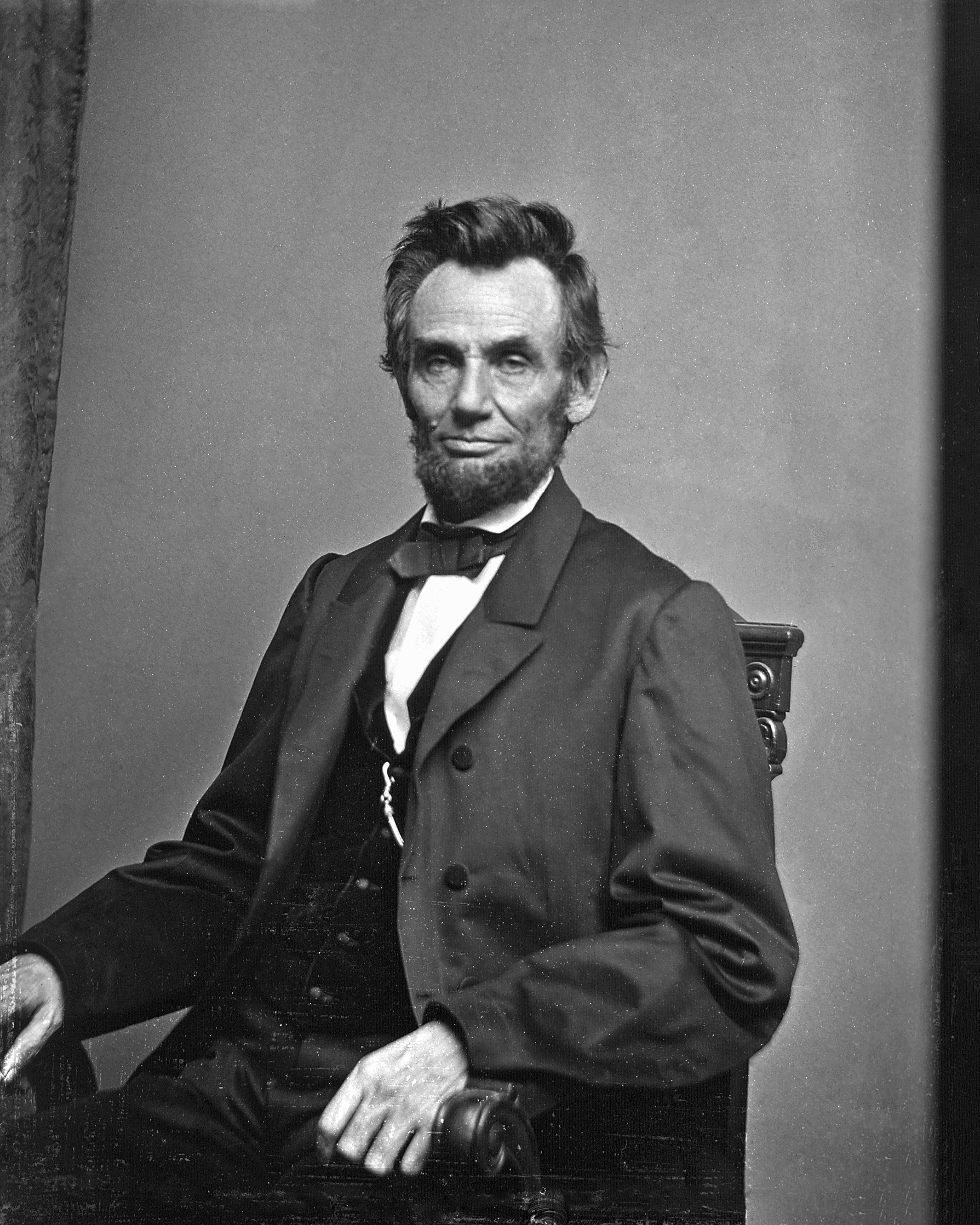
- Lincoln in 1864
- Official name: Birthday of President Abraham Lincoln
- Observed by: Various U.S. states
- Type: Local
- Significance: To honor Abraham Lincoln, 16th President of the United States
- Date: February 12
- Next time: February 12, 2027
- Frequency: Annual
- Related to: Presidents' Day

Lincoln's Birthday is a public holiday in some U.S. states, observed on the anniversary of Abraham Lincoln's birth on February 12, 1809, in Hodgenville, Kentucky. Connecticut, Illinois, Indiana, Michigan, Ohio, California, Missouri, and New York observe the holiday.

In many other states, Lincoln's birthday is not celebrated separately, as a stand-alone holiday. Instead, Lincoln's birthday is combined with a celebration of President George Washington's birthday (also in February) and celebrated either along with the Federal holiday of Washington's Birthday or as Presidents' Day on the third Monday in February.

== History ==
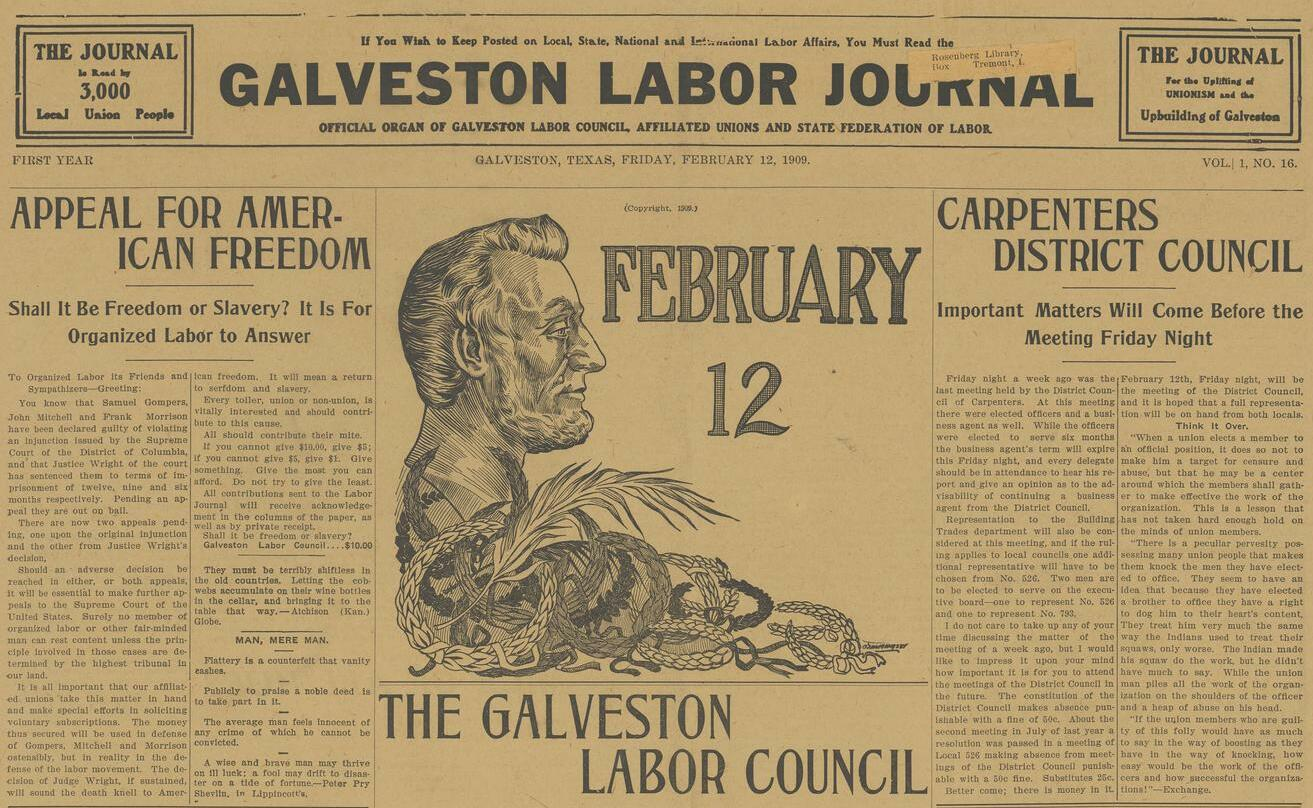
The February 15, 1909 edition of the Galveston Labor Journal, in Galveston, Texas, honors Lincoln. From the collections of the Rosenberg Library.

The earliest known observance of Lincoln's birthday occurred in Buffalo, New York, in either 1873 or 1874. Julius Francis (d. 1881), a Buffalo druggist, made it his life's mission to honor the slain president. He repeatedly petitioned Congress to establish Lincoln's birthday as a legal holiday.

The day is marked by traditional wreath-laying ceremonies at Abraham Lincoln Birthplace National Historic Site in Hodgenville, Kentucky, and at the Lincoln Memorial in Washington, D.C. The latter has been the site of a ceremony ever since the Memorial was dedicated. Since that event in 1922, observances continue to be organized by the Lincoln Birthday National Commemorative Committee and by the Military Order of the Loyal Legion of the United States (MOLLUS). A wreath is laid on behalf of the President of the United States, a custom also carried out at the grave sites of all deceased U.S. presidents on their birthdays. Lincoln's tomb is in Springfield, Illinois.

On February 12, 2009, the annual wreath-laying ceremony at the Lincoln Memorial commemorated Lincoln's 200th birthday in grand fashion. An extended ceremony, organized by the Abraham Lincoln Bicentennial Commission (ALBC) and with help from MOLLUS, featured musical performances from four-time Grammy-nominated singer Michael Feinstein and the U.S. Marine Corps Band. The morning celebration also featured remarks by Illinois Sen. Dick Durbin; Lincoln scholar and ALBC Co-chair Harold Holzer; recently retired Rhode Island Supreme Court Chief Justice – and ALBC Commissioner – Frank J. Williams; and author Nikki Giovanni reciting her newest work, which was written especially for the Bicentennial.

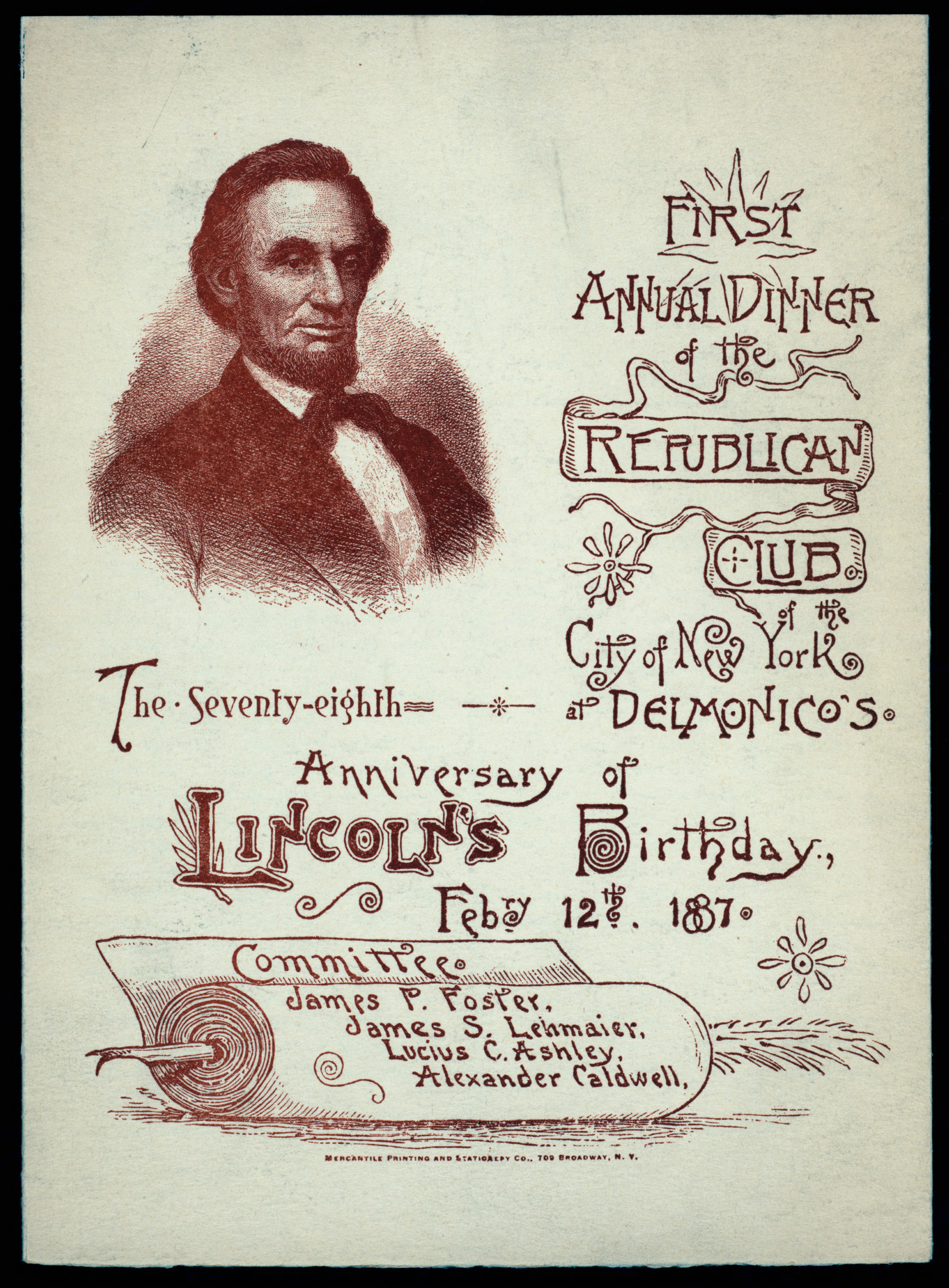
Menu from Lincoln's Birthday celebration held by the Republican Club of the City of New York in 1887. Many Republican Party organizations hold Lincoln's Birthday celebrations because Lincoln was the first Republican president.

As part of Lincoln's birthday bicentennial, the U.S. Mint released four new Lincoln cents. The commemorative coins have new designs on the reverse showing stages of his life. The first went into circulation on September 12, 2009. The standard portrait of Lincoln's head remains on the front. The new designs include a log cabin representing his birthplace, Lincoln as a young man reading while sitting on a log that he was taking a break from splitting, Lincoln as a state legislator in front of the Illinois Capitol, and the partially built dome of the U.S. Capitol.

New Jersey started observing the holiday on May 23, 2008, with the enactment of the Public Employee Pension and Benefits Reform Act of 2008.

=== Origin of Black History Month ===
Black History Month has its origin in 19th-century celebrations of Lincoln's Birthday by African-American communities in the United States. By the early 20th century, black communities were annually celebrating Lincoln's birthday in conjunction with the birthday of former slave and abolitionist Frederick Douglass on February 14. The precursor to Black History Month was created in 1926 when historian Carter G. Woodson and the Association for the Study of Negro Life and History announced that the second week of February would be "Negro History Week" to coincide with the traditional Black commemorations of both men's birthdays. By the 1970s, "Negro History Week" had become "Black History Month". Black History Month has expanded further to Canada, where it is also celebrated in February, and to the United Kingdom, which celebrates it in October.

== Official government holidays ==
Lincoln's Birthday was never a U.S. Federal Government holiday. The third Monday in February remains only "Washington's Birthday" in federal law. However, many state governments have officially renamed their Washington's Birthday state holiday as "Presidents' Day", "Washington and Lincoln Day", or other such designations which explicitly or implicitly celebrate Lincoln's birthday. Regardless of the official name and purpose, celebrations and commemorations on or about the third Monday often include honoring Lincoln.

In Connecticut, Missouri and Illinois, while Washington's Birthday is a federal holiday, Lincoln's Birthday is still a state holiday, falling on February 12 regardless of the day of the week. California still lists Lincoln's Birthday as a holiday, but as of 2009 no longer gives State employees a paid holiday on February 12. However, it is considered a "Court holiday" and state courts are closed.

In the following states, the third Monday in February is an official state holiday and known as:

Using "president"

- Presidents' Day in Hawaii, New Mexico, North Dakota, Oklahoma, Puerto Rico, South Carolina, South Dakota, Texas, Vermont, and Washington
- President's Day in Alaska, Idaho, Maryland, Massachusetts, Michigan, Nebraska, New Hampshire, Tennessee, West Virginia, and Wyoming
- Presidents Day in Nevada, New Jersey, and Oregon
- Washington's Birthday/President's Day in Maine
- Lincoln/Washington/Presidents' Day in Arizona

Washington and Lincoln

- Washington and Lincoln Day in Utah
- Washington–Lincoln Day in Colorado and Ohio
- Washington's and Lincoln's Birthday in Indiana
- Lincoln's and Washington's Birthday in Montana
- Washington's and Lincoln's Birthday in Minnesota

Washington alone

- George Washington Day in Virginia

Washington and another person

- George Washington/Thomas Jefferson Birthday in Alabama
- George Washington's Birthday and Daisy Gatson Bates Day in Arkansas

Unspecified

- "The third Monday in February" in California.

Several states honor presidents with official state holidays that do not fall on the third Monday of February. In New Mexico, Presidents' Day, at least as a state-government paid holiday, is observed on the Friday following Thanksgiving. In Georgia, Presidents' Day, at least as a state-government paid holiday, is observed on Christmas Eve. (Observed on the prior Thursday if Christmas falls on Saturday; observed on the prior Friday if Christmas falls on a Sunday. If December 24 is a Wednesday, then this holiday is observed on Friday December 26.)

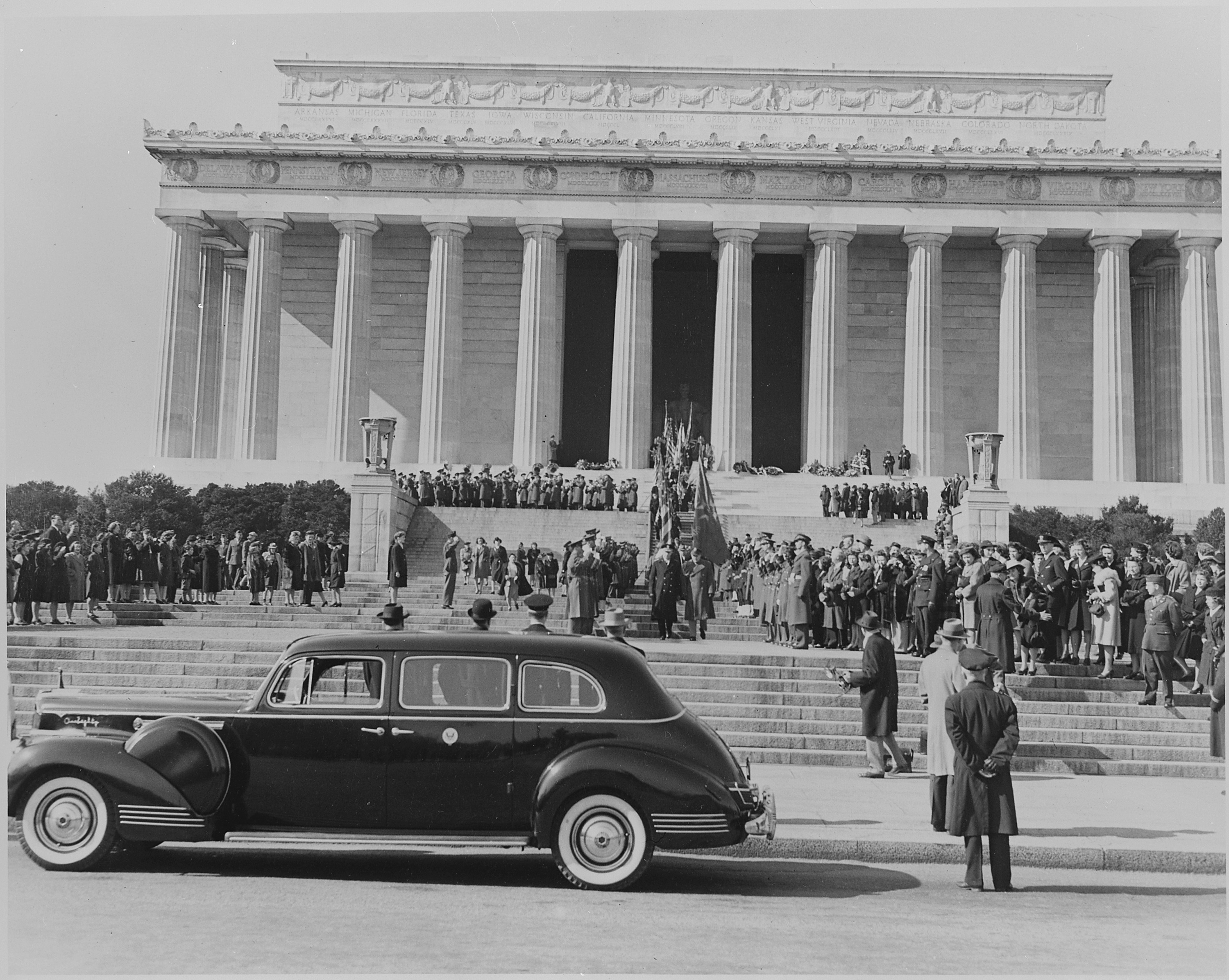
Photograph of ceremony at Lincoln Memorial attended by Vice President Truman, celebrating Lincoln's Birthday on February 12, 1945

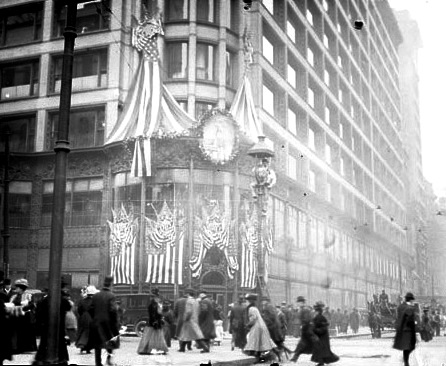
Carson Pirie Scott & Co. store on State Street in Chicago, Illinois decorated for Lincoln's 100th birthday in 1909

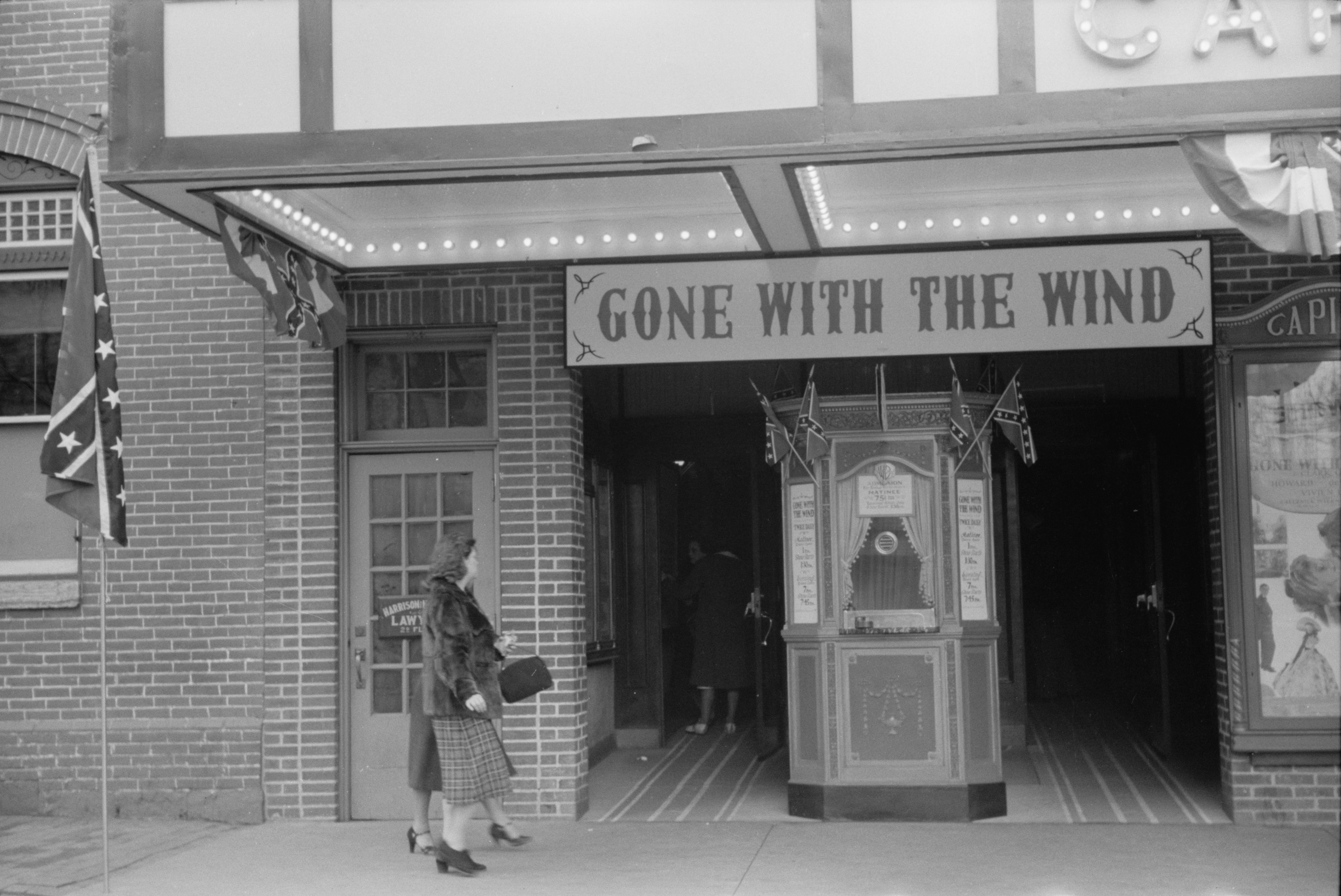
Flags of the Confederacy displayed at a movie house on Lincoln's birthday in Winchester, Virginia, in February 1940

== Cultural references ==
- In the Ring Lardner short story "Gullible's Travels", a vacationer from Chicago is unaware that Lincoln's Birthday is not observed in Florida.

== Bibliography ==
- Schauffler, R. H. (1909). Lincoln's Birthday on Project Gutenberg

== See also ==
- Darwin Day
- Jefferson's Birthday
- Public holidays in the United States
- United States commemorative coin
