= GeorgeFest =

Festival honoring US President George Washington

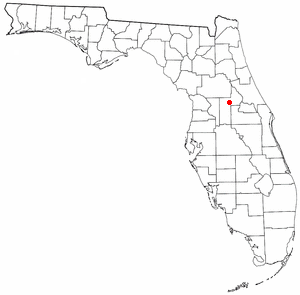
Location of Eustis, Florida

GeorgeFest is held annually in the last weekend of February in the city of Eustis, Florida, to honor Founding Father George Washington. With 124 consecutive events, the Eustis GeorgeFest is the longest ongoing festival of its kind in the United States. The event is sponsored by small donors as well as the Lake Eustis Chamber of Commerce and the City of Eustis.

On February 21, 2015 Eustis hosted its first annual GeorgeFest 5k.

The many activities of the festival include outdoor dining, singing and music, fireworks, carnival rides, a float parade and an annual 5 km (3.1 mile) run.

== History ==
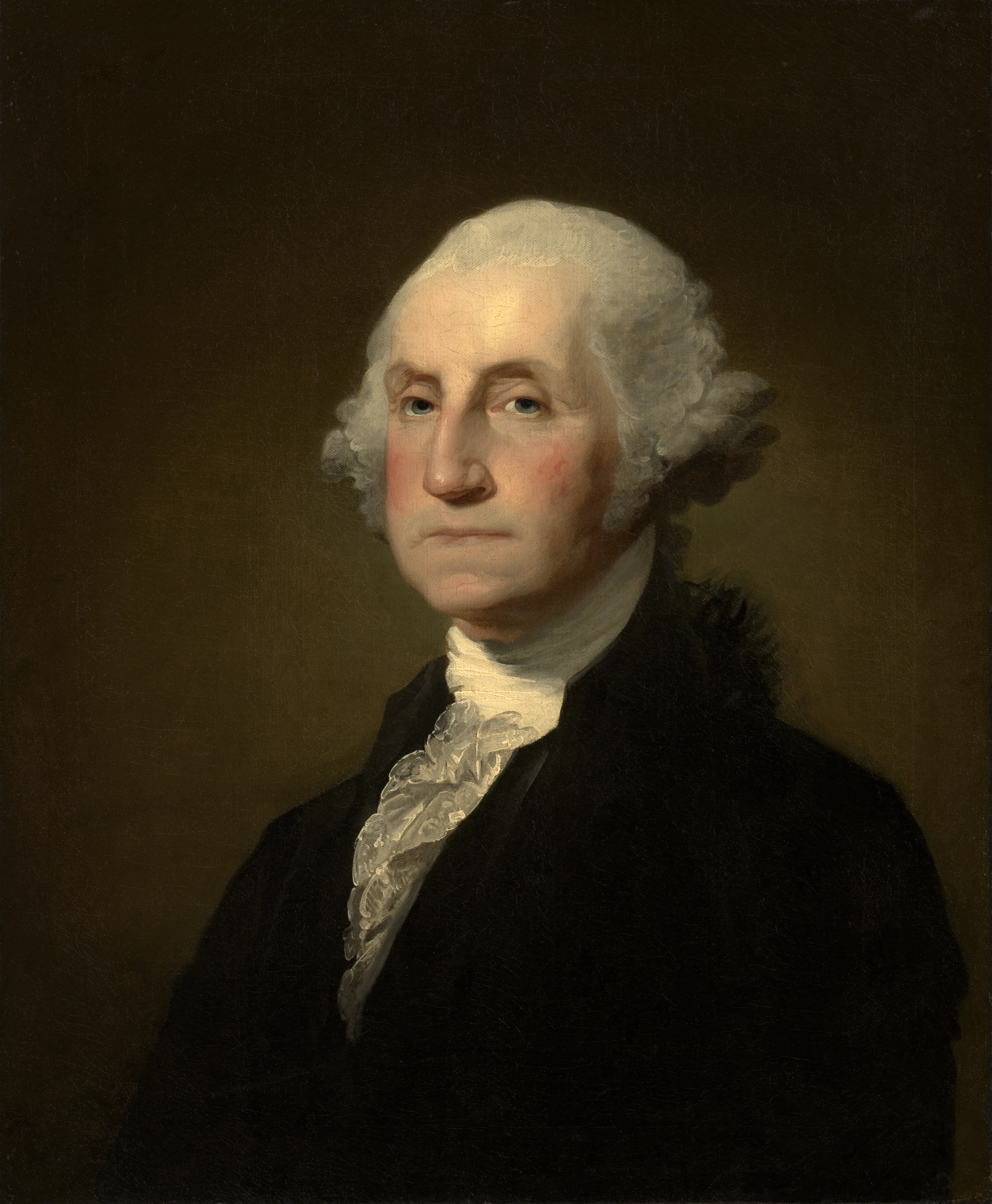
George Washington, first President of the United States

From a simple one-day parade of Ford Model Ts to an event that attracts thousands of visitors every year, the Eustis GeorgeFest has increased in both size and scope. While it continues to grow, the primary theme of the festivities has never changed. GeorgeFest is a patriotic event held in honor of America's Founding Father, George Washington.

In 1876, the Ocklawaha House was built as a hotel to serve the many tradesman traveling through the area. GeorgeFest's modest beginnings can be traced back to this building which still stands today as the oldest remaining hotel in the area. In 1902 construction began to enlarge the hotel. On February 22, 1902, while the hotel was under construction, the residents of Eustis held a holiday in honor of Washington and in celebration of Florida's early heritage. The event would continue to be held once a year on February 22 in honor of George Washington's birthday. However, the festivities were later spread out over several weeks and were eventually assigned to the last weekend of February where they remain today.

In spite of the COVID-19 pandemic, the City of Eustis chose to continue hosting the annual Georgefest event. In doing so, the Eustis event passed Laredo, Texas' "Washington Birthday Celebration" as the longest running celebration of George Washington’s Birthday in the United States, following that event's cancellation in 2021.
