= South Korea =

Country in East Asia

Republic of Korea 대한민국 (Korean) Daehanminguk
- Flag Emblem
- Anthem: 애국가 (Aegukga) "Patriotic Song"
- Seal

- Territory controlled Territory claimed but not controlled (North Korea)
- Capital and largest city: Seoul (Note: A new administrative capital, Sejong, has been under construction since 2007. Numerous ministries and agencies had relocated to Sejong. However, based on a Constitutional Court decision in 2004, complete capital relocation from Seoul requires a constitutional referendum. As of 2026, Seoul remains the seat of the Blue House, National Assembly, Supreme Court, and Constitutional Court.); 37°33′N 126°58′E
- Official languages: Korean (Pyojuneo); Korean Sign Language
- Official script: Hangul (Hangeul)
- Ethnic groups (2024): 94.8% Korean; 5.2% other
- Religion (2024): 51% no religion; 31% Christianity; 20% Protestant; 11% Catholic; 17% Buddhism; 2% other
- Demonyms: South Korean; Korean
- Government: Unitary presidential republic
  - President: Lee Jae Myung
  - Prime Minister: Han Seong-sook
  - Speaker of the National Assembly: Cho Jeong-sik
  - Chief Justice of the Supreme Court: Cho Hee-dae
  - President of the Constitutional Court: Kim Sanghwan
- Legislature: National Assembly

Establishment history
  - Provisional Government in-exile: 11 April 1919
  - American administration south of the 38th parallel: 8 September 1945
  - ROK established: 15 August 1948
  - Current constitution: 29 October 1987

Area
  - Total: 100,472 km^{2} (38,792 sq mi) (107th)
  - Water (%): 0.3

Population
  - 2026 estimate: ▲51,106,229 (29th)
  - Density: 509/km^{2} (1,318.3/sq mi) (27th)
- GDP (PPP): 2026 estimate
  - Total: ▲$3.626 trillion (13th)
  - Per capita: ▲$70,251 (27th)
- GDP (nominal): 2026 estimate
  - Total: ▲$2.246 trillion (12th)
  - Per capita: ▲$43,512 (31st)
- Gini (2021): ▼33.3 medium inequality
- HDI (2023): ▲0.937 very high (20th)
- Currency: Korean Republic won (₩) (KRW)
- Time zone: UTC+9 (Korea Standard Time)
- Date format: yyyy/mm/dd (Note: See Date and time notation in South Korea.)
- Calling code: +82
- ISO 3166 code: KR
- Internet TLD: .kr; .한국

South Korea, (Note: South Koreans use the name Hanguk (한국; 韓國) when referring to South Korea or Korea as a whole. The literal translation of South Korea, Namhan (남한; 南韓), is rarely used. Until a change in policy in 2024, the official line in North Korea was to use the name Namjosŏn (Namjoseon; 남조선; 南朝鮮) when referring to South Korea, derived from the North Korean name for Korea, Chosŏn (Joseon; 조선; 朝鮮). The North Korean state now also uses Hanguk when referring to South Korea.) officially the Republic of Korea (ROK), (Note: Korean: 대한민국; Hanja: 大韓民國; RR: Daehanminguk; lit. 'Great Han Nation' or 'Great Korean Nation') is a country in East Asia. It extends over the southern half of the Korean Peninsula and includes the adjacent islands. It borders North Korea to its north along the Korean Demilitarized Zone, with the Yellow Sea to the west and the Sea of Japan to the east. It has a population of about 52 million, of which half live in the Seoul metropolitan area, the world's ninth most populous metropolitan area; its other major cities are Busan, Daegu, and Incheon.

The Korean Peninsula was inhabited as early as the Lower Paleolithic period. Its first kingdom was noted in Chinese records in the early seventh century BC. From the mid first century BC, various polities consolidated into the rival kingdoms of Goguryeo, Baekje, and Silla. The latter eventually unified most of the peninsula for the first time in the late seventh century CE, while Balhae succeeded Goguryeo in the north. The Goryeo dynasty (918–1392) achieved lasting unification and established the basis for Korean identity. The subsequent Joseon dynasty (1392–1897) generated cultural, economic, and scientific achievements but maintained an isolationist policy from the mid-17th century. The short-lived Korean Empire (1897–1910) sought modernization and reform but was annexed in 1910 into the Empire of Japan. Japanese rule ended following Japan's surrender in World War II, after which Korea was divided into two zones: the Soviet-occupied northern zone and the United States–occupied southern zone.

After negotiations on reunification failed, the southern zone became the Republic of Korea in August 1948, while the northern zone became the Soviet-aligned Democratic People's Republic of Korea the following month. In 1950, a Soviet-backed North Korean invasion triggered the Korean War, one of the first proxy conflicts of the Cold War, which featured extensive fighting, drawing in the American-led United Nations Command and the People's Volunteer Army from China. The war ended in 1953 with an armistice with three million Koreans dead and both economies in ruins; due to the lack of a peace treaty, the Korean conflict officially continues.

South Korea endured a series of dictatorships punctuated by coups, revolutions, and violent uprisings, but also experienced a soaring economy and one of the world's fastest rises in average GDP per capita, leading to its emergence as one of the Four Asian Tigers. The June Democratic Struggle of 1987 ended authoritarian rule and led to the establishment of the current Sixth Republic.

South Korea is among the most advanced democracies in Asia. Under the 1987 constitution, it maintains a unitary presidential republic with a popularly elected, unicameral legislature, the National Assembly. South Korea is a major non-NATO ally of the United States and is regarded as a regional power in East Asia and an emerging power in global affairs. Its conscription-based armed forces rank as one of the world's strongest, engaging the second highest number of military and paramilitary personnel.

A highly developed country, South Korea's economy is the 14th largest, ranked by nominal GDP and PPP-adjusted GDP; it is the world's ninth-largest exporter and tenth-largest importer. The country performs well in metrics of education, human development, democratic governance, and innovation. South Korea is a member of the OECD's Development Assistance Committee, the G20, the IPEF, and the Paris Club. It has one of the world's longest life expectances, though its population is aging rapidly, due to one of the world's lowest fertility rates.

South Korea has some of the fastest Internet connection speeds and densest high-speed railway networks. At the turn of the 21st century, the country became renowned for the Korean Wave, its globally influential pop culture, particularly in music, TV dramas, and cinema.

== Etymology ==
Korea is an exonym derived from the historical Korean kingdom name Goryeo (Korean: 고려; Hanja: 高麗; MR: Koryŏ). Goryeo was the shortened name officially adopted by Goguryeo in the 5th century CE and the name of its 10th-century successor state Goryeo. Visiting Arab and Persian merchants pronounced it as "Korea". The modern name first appears in Portuguese maps of 1568 by João vaz Dourado as Conrai and later in the late 16th century and early 17th century as Corea (Korea) in the 1630 maps of Teixeira Albernaz.

Goryeo first became known to Europeans when Afonso de Albuquerque conquered Malacca in 1511 and described the people who traded in this part of the world as the Gores. Despite the coexistence of the spellings Corea and Korea in 19th-century publications, some Koreans believe that Imperial Japan intentionally standardized the spelling of Korea in order to make Japan appear first alphabetically during occupation.

After Goryeo was replaced by the Kingdom of Joseon (조선; 朝鮮; Chosŏn) in 1392, Joseon became the official name for the territory, though it was not universally accepted. The new official name was derived from the ancient kingdom of Gojoseon. In 1897, King Gojong changed the country's official name from Joseon to the Korean Empire (대한제국; 大韓帝國; Daehan Jeguk; Taehan Cheguk; lit. 'Great Han Empire'). The latter half of the Korean Empire's name Daehan (대한; 大韓; lit. 'Great Han') derives from Samhan (Three Han), referring to the Three Kingdoms of Korea, not the ancient confederacies in the southern Korean Peninsula. However, the name Joseon was still widely used by Koreans to refer to their country, even though it was no longer the official name. Under Japanese rule, the two names Han and Joseon coexisted.

Following the surrender of Japan, in 1945, the "Republic of Korea" was adopted as the legal English name for the new country. The Korean name Daehan Minguk (대한민국; 大韓民國; lit. 'Great Han Republic') is sometimes used by South Koreans as a metonym to refer to the Korean nation as a whole, rather than just the South Korean state.

== History ==
=== Ancient Korea ===
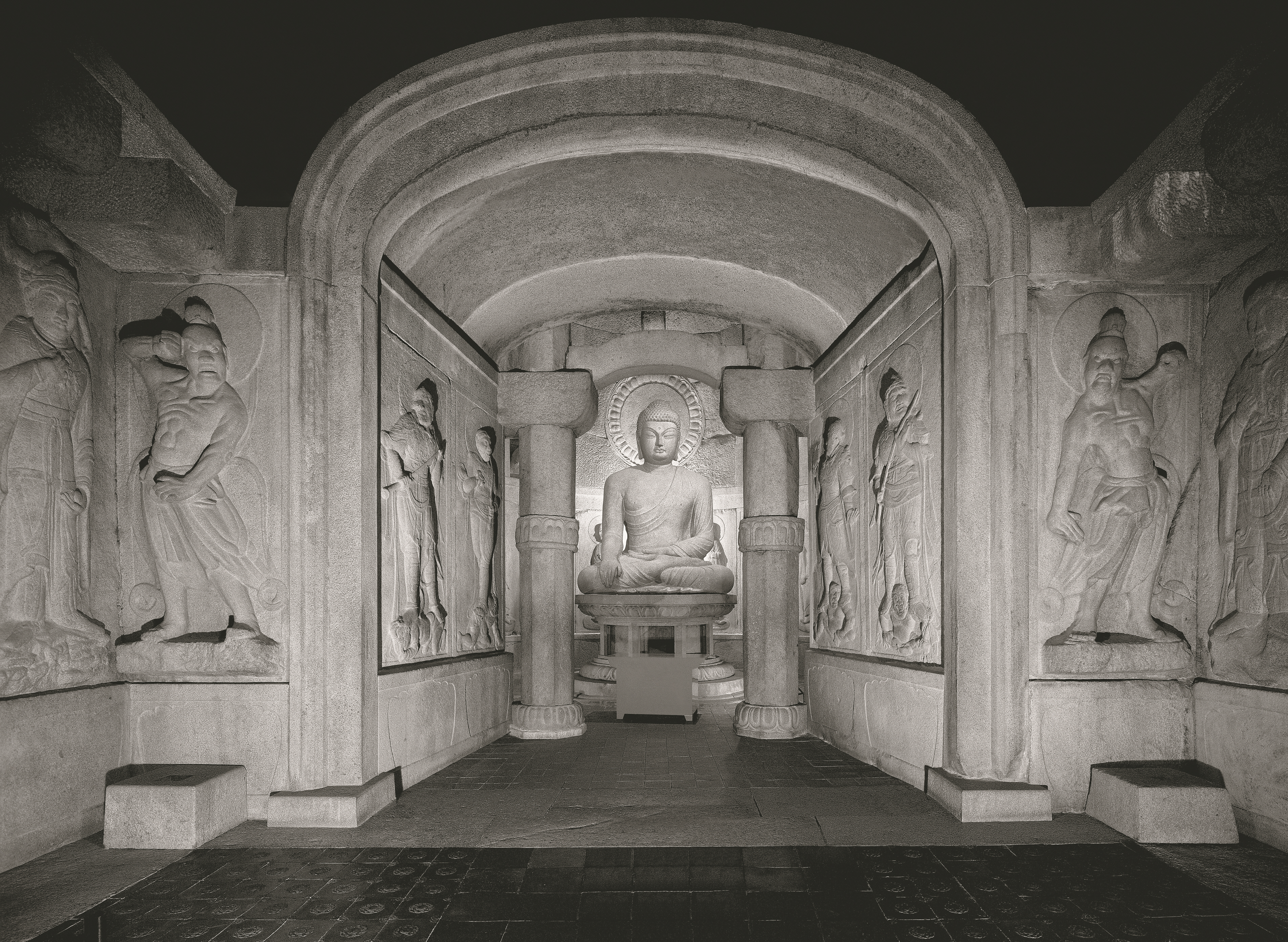
Seokguram Grotto from the Silla era, a UNESCO World Heritage Site

The Korean Peninsula was inhabited as early as the Lower Paleolithic period. According to Korea's founding mythology, the history of Korea begins with the founding of Joseon (also known as "Gojoseon", or "Old Joseon", to differentiate it from the 14th century dynasty) in 2333 BC by the legendary Dangun. Gojoseon was noted in Chinese records in the early 7th century. Gojoseon expanded until it controlled the northern Korean Peninsula and parts of Manchuria. Gija Joseon was purportedly founded in the 12th century BC, but its existence and role have been controversial in the modern era. In 108 BC, the Han dynasty defeated Wiman Joseon and installed four commanderies in the northern Korean peninsula. Three of the commanderies fell or retreated westward within a few decades, but the Lelang commandery remained a center of cultural and economic exchange with successive Chinese dynasties ruling for four centuries, until it was conquered by Goguryeo in 313.

The linguistic homeland of Proto-Koreans is located somewhere in southern Siberia, or Manchuria, such as the Liao River area or the Amur River area. Proto-Koreans arrived in the southern part of the Korean Peninsula at around 300 BC, replacing and assimilating Japonic-speaking Yayoi and likely causing their migration to the Japanese archipelago.

=== Three Kingdoms of Korea ===
During the Proto–Three Kingdoms period, the states of Buyeo, Okjeo, Dongye, and Samhan occupied the whole Korean peninsula and southern Manchuria. From them, the Three Kingdoms of Korea emerged: Goguryeo, Baekje, and Silla.

Goguryeo, the largest and most powerful among them, was a highly militaristic state and competed with various Chinese dynasties during its 700 years of history. Goguryeo experienced a golden age under Gwanggaeto the Great and his son Jangsu, who both subdued Baekje and Silla during their respective reigns, achieving a brief unification of the Three Kingdoms and becoming the most dominant power on the Korean Peninsula. In addition to contesting control of the Korean Peninsula, Goguryeo had many military conflicts with various Chinese dynasties, most notably the Goguryeo–Sui War, in which Goguryeo defeated a huge force said to number over a million men.

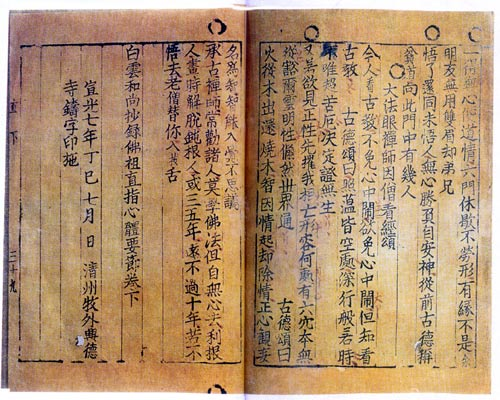
The oldest surviving metal movable type book, the Jikji, was printed in 1377, and Goryeo created the world's first metal-based movable type in 1234.

Baekje was a maritime power, sometimes called the "Phoenicia of East Asia". Its maritime ability was instrumental in the dissemination of Buddhism throughout East Asia and spreading continental culture to Japan. Baekje was once a great military power on the Korean Peninsula, especially during the time of Geunchogo, but was critically defeated by Gwanggaeto the Great and declined. Silla was the smallest and weakest of the three, but used opportunistic pacts and alliances with the more powerful Korean kingdoms, and eventually Tang China, to its advantage.

In 676, the unification of the Three Kingdoms by Silla led to the Northern and Southern States period, in which relationships between Korea and China remained relatively peaceful. Balhae, a Goguryeo successor state founded by a general, controlled most of Manchuria and parts of the Russian Far East and was called the "Prosperous Country in the East". In addition to Koreans, there were many other ethnicities such as the Mohe, Turkic, and Chinese.

Late Silla was a wealthy country, and its metropolitan capital of Gyeongju grew to become the fourth largest city in the world. It experienced a golden age of art and culture, exemplified by monuments such as Hwangnyongsa, Seokguram, and the Emille Bell. It also carried on the maritime legacy and prowess of Baekje, and during the 8th and 9th centuries dominated the seas of East Asia and the trade between China, Korea, and Japan, most notably during the time of Chang Pogo. In addition, the Silla people made overseas communities in China on the Shandong Peninsula and the mouth of the Yangtze River. However, Silla was later weakened due to internal strife and the revival of successor states Baekje and Goguryeo, which culminated into the Later Three Kingdoms period in the late 9th century.

Buddhism flourished during this time. Many Korean Buddhists gained great fame among Chinese Buddhist circles and greatly contributed to Chinese Buddhism. Examples of significant Korean Buddhists from this period include Woncheuk, Wonhyo, Uisang, Musang, and Kim Gyo-gak. Kim was a Silla prince whose influence made Mount Jiuhua one of the Four Sacred Mountains of Chinese Buddhism.

=== Unified dynasties ===
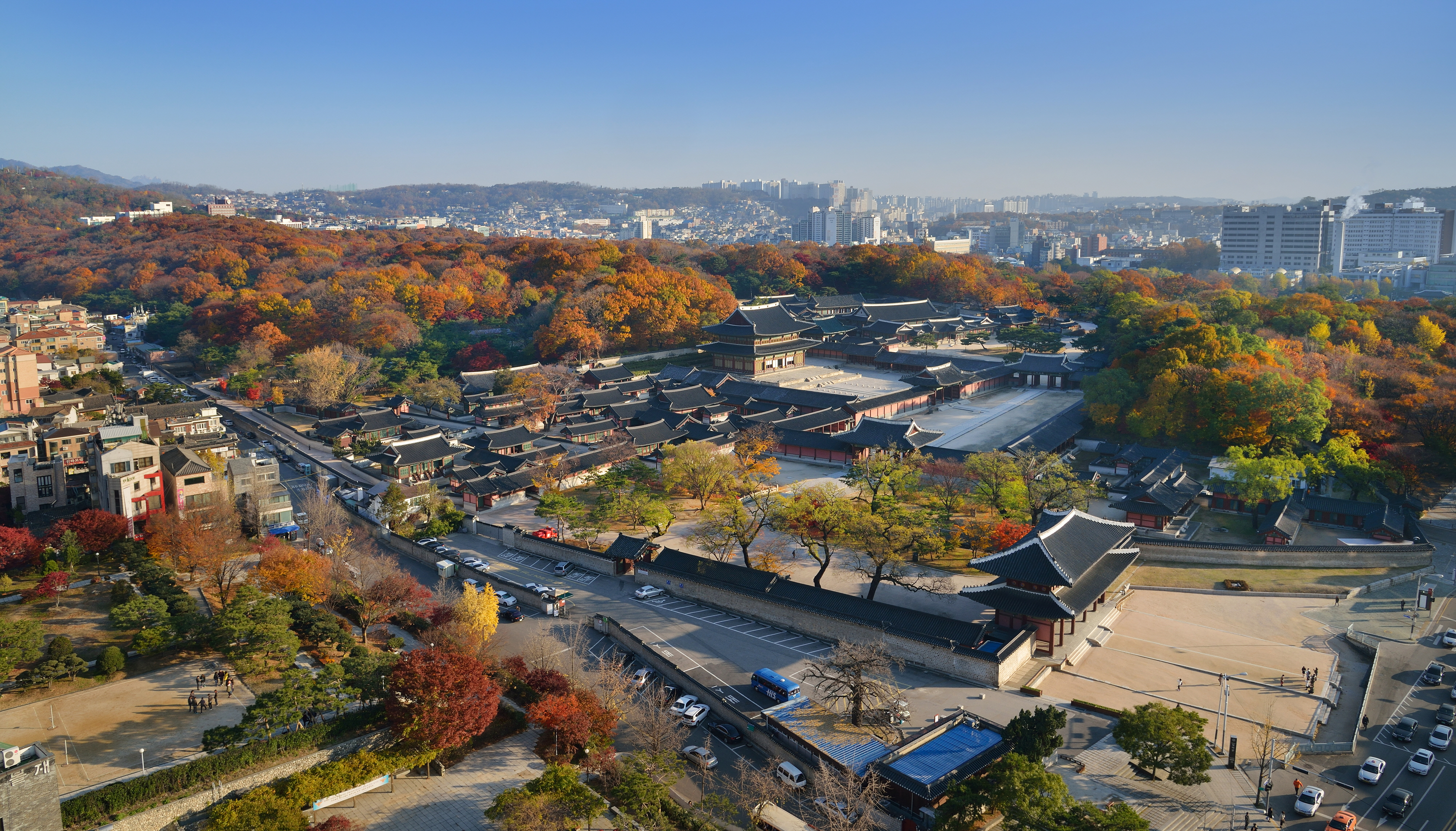
Changdeokgung, pictured in 2014, one of the Five Grand Palaces of Seoul built during the Joseon dynasty and a UNESCO World Heritage Site

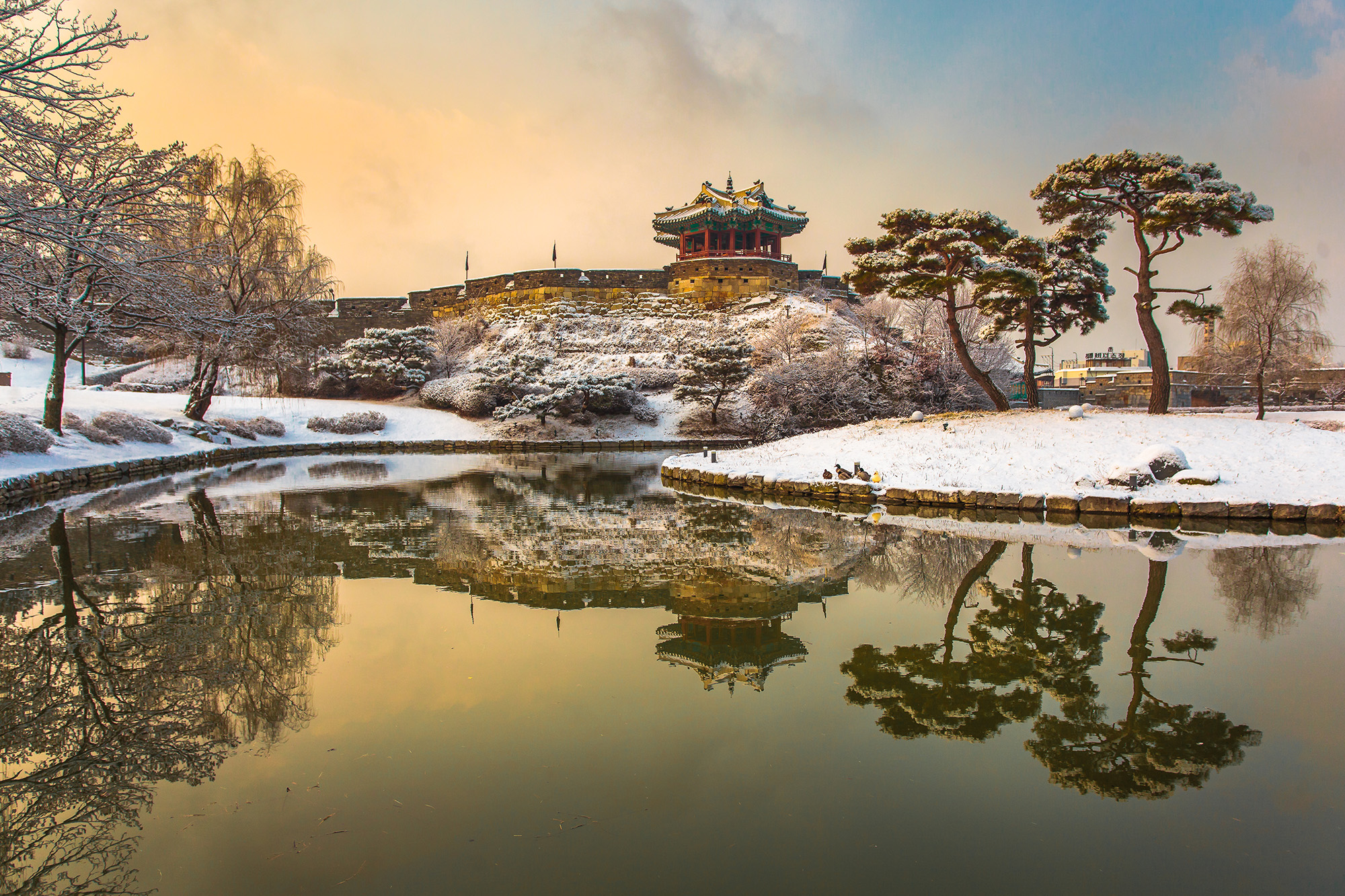
Banghwa Suryu Pavilion, part of Hwaseong Fortress, a UNESCO World Heritage Site (2019)

In 936, the Later Three Kingdoms were united by Wang Geon, who established Goryeo as a successor state to Goguryeo. Balhae had fallen to the Khitan Empire in 926, and a decade later the last crown prince of Balhae fled south to Goryeo, where he was warmly welcomed and included in the ruling family by Wang Geon, thus unifying the two successor nations of Goguryeo. Like Silla, Goryeo was a culturally influential state that invented the metal movable type printing press. After defeating the Khitan Empire, which was the most powerful empire of its time in the Goryeo–Khitan War, Goryeo experienced a golden age that lasted a century, during which the Tripitaka Koreana was completed and significant developments in printing and publishing occurred. This promoted education and the dispersion of knowledge on philosophy, literature, religion, and science. By 1100, there were 12 universities that produced notable scholars.

Following three decades of devastating Mongol invasions in the 13th century, the Goryeo dynasty—never fully conquered but severely weakened—submitted as a vassal state to the Yuan dynasty. The Korean court surrendered, sending the crown prince to pledge allegiance to Kublai Khan, who accepted Goryeo as a semi-autonomous ally and sealed the submission through marriage. Henceforth, Goryeo continued to rule Korea, though as a tributary ally to the Mongols for the next 86 years. During this period, the two nations' royalty became intertwined as all subsequent Korean kings married Mongol princesses. In the mid-14th century, Goryeo drove out the Mongols to regain its northern territories, briefly conquered Liaoyang, and defeated invasions by the Red Turbans. However, in 1392, General Yi Seong-gye, who had been ordered to attack China, turned his army around and staged a successful coup.

Yi Seong-gye established the House of Yi, renamed the nation to Joseon in reference to Gojoseon, and moved the capital to Hanseong (one of the old names of Seoul). The first 200 years of the Joseon dynasty were marked by peace and saw great advancements in science and education, among them the creation of Hangul by Sejong the Great to promote literacy among the common people. The prevailing ideology of the time was Neo-Confucianism, which was epitomized by the seonbi class: nobles who passed up positions of wealth and power to lead lives of study and integrity. Between 1592 and 1598, Japan under Toyotomi Hideyoshi launched invasions of Korea, but the advance was halted by Korean forces (most notably the Joseon Navy led by Admiral Yi Sun-sin and his renowned "turtle ship") with assistance from righteous army militias formed by Korean civilians, and Ming dynasty Chinese troops. Through a series of successful battles of attrition, the Japanese forces were eventually forced to withdraw, and relations between all parties became normalized. However, the Manchus took advantage of Joseon's war-weakened state and invaded in 1627 and 1637. After normalizing relations with the Qing dynasty, Joseon experienced a nearly 200-year period of peace. Kings Yeongjo and Jeongjo particularly led a new renaissance of the Joseon dynasty during the 18th century.

In the 19th century, Joseon experienced economic difficulties and widespread uprisings, including the Donghak Peasant Revolution. The royal in-law families had gained control of the government, leading to mass corruption and weakening of the state. Additionally, the strict isolationism of the Joseon government that earned it the nickname "the hermit kingdom" became increasingly ineffective due to increasing encroachment from powers such as Japan, Russia, and the United States. This was exemplified by the Joseon–United States Treaty of 1882, which forced Joseon to open its borders.

=== Japanese occupation and World War II ===
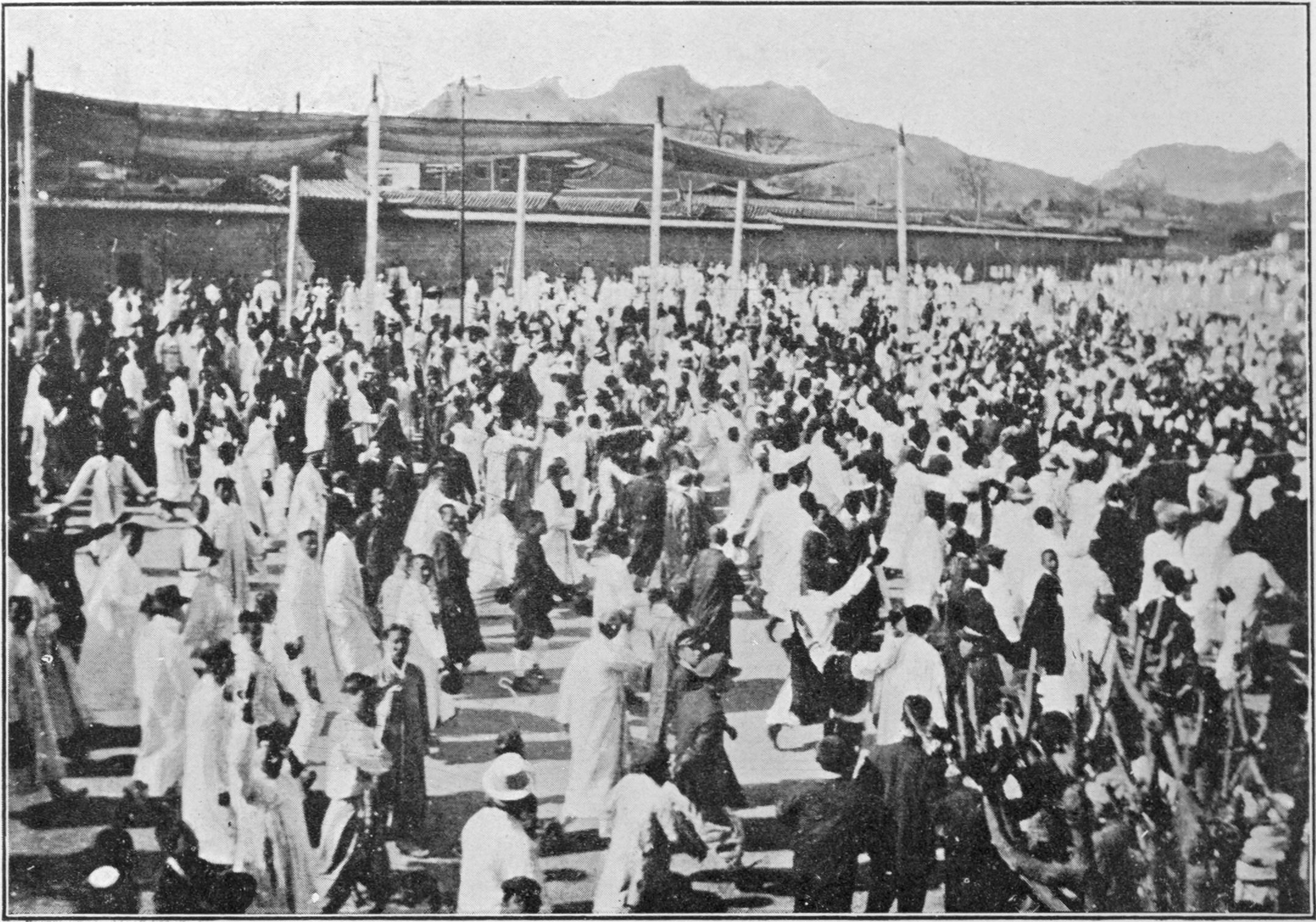
March First Movement 1919, protests in Seoul against Japanese colonial rule

In the late 19th century, Japan became a significant regional power after winning the First Sino-Japanese War against Qing China and the Russo-Japanese War against the Russian Empire. In 1897, King Gojong, the last king of Korea, proclaimed Joseon as the Korean Empire. However, Japan compelled Korea to become its protectorate in 1905 and formally annexed it in 1910. What followed was a period of forced assimilation in which the Korean language, culture, and history were suppressed. This led to the March First Movement protests in 1919 and the subsequent foundation of resistance groups in exile, primarily in China. Among the resistance groups was Provisional Government of the Republic of Korea.

Towards the end of World War II, the U.S. proposed dividing the Korean peninsula into two occupation zones: a U.S. zone and a Soviet zone. Dean Rusk and Charles H. Bonesteel III suggested the 38th parallel as the dividing line, as it placed Seoul under U.S. control. To the surprise of Rusk and Bonesteel, the Soviets accepted their proposal and agreed to divide Korea.

=== Division of Korea ===
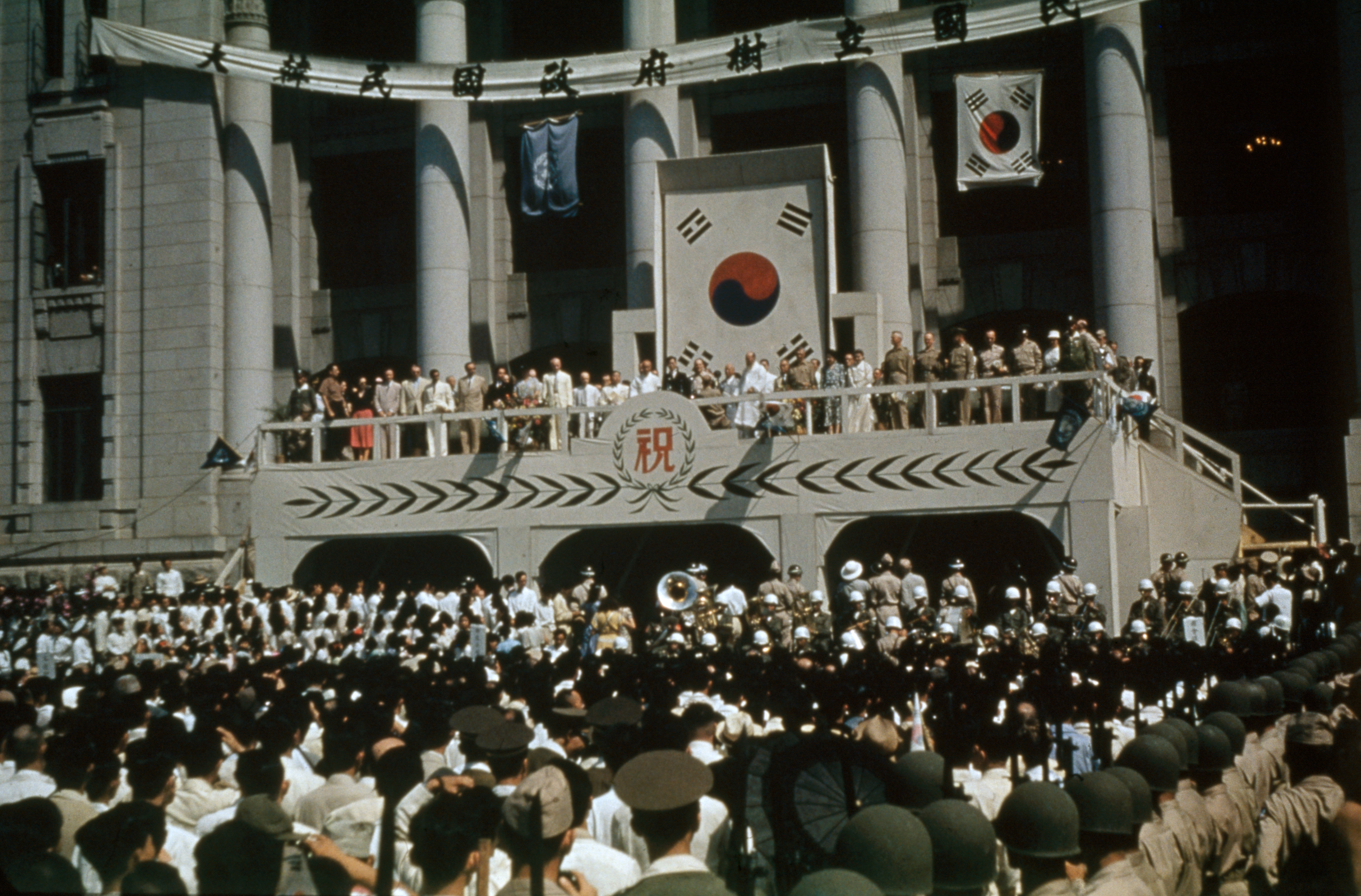
Ceremony for the inauguration of the South Korean government (August 15, 1948)

Despite intentions to liberate a unified peninsula in the 1943 Cairo Declaration, escalating tensions between the Soviet Union and the United States led to the division of Korea into two political entities in 1948: North Korea and South Korea.

In the South, the United States appointed and supported the former head of the Korean Provisional Government Syngman Rhee as leader. Rhee won the first presidential elections of the newly declared Republic of Korea in May 1948. In the North, the Soviets backed a former anti-Japanese guerrilla and communist activist, Kim Il Sung, who was appointed premier of the Democratic People's Republic of Korea in September.

In October, the Soviet Union declared Kim Il Sung's government as sovereign over both the north and south. The UN declared Rhee's government as "a lawful government having effective control and jurisdiction over that part of Korea where the UN Temporary Commission on Korea was able to observe and consult" and the government "based on elections which was [sic] observed by the Temporary Commission" in addition to a statement that "this is the only such government in Korea." Both leaders engaged in authoritarian repression of political opponents. South Korea requested military support from the United States but was denied, while North Korea's military was heavily reinforced by the Soviet Union.

=== Korean War ===
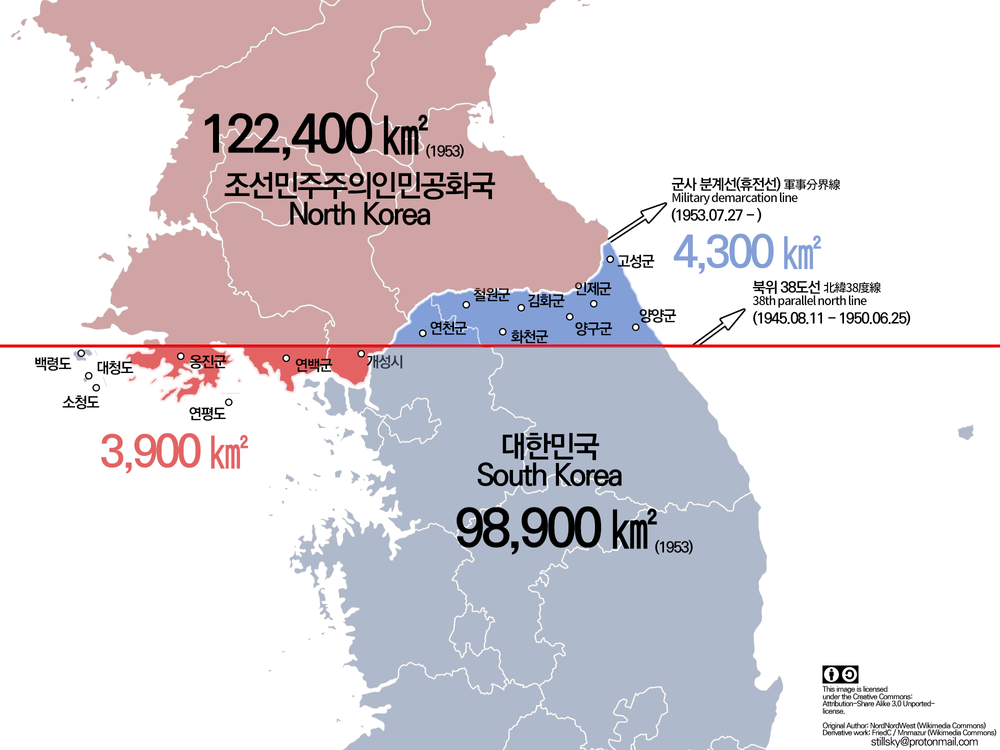
Changes in the territory of South and North Korea before and after the Korean War

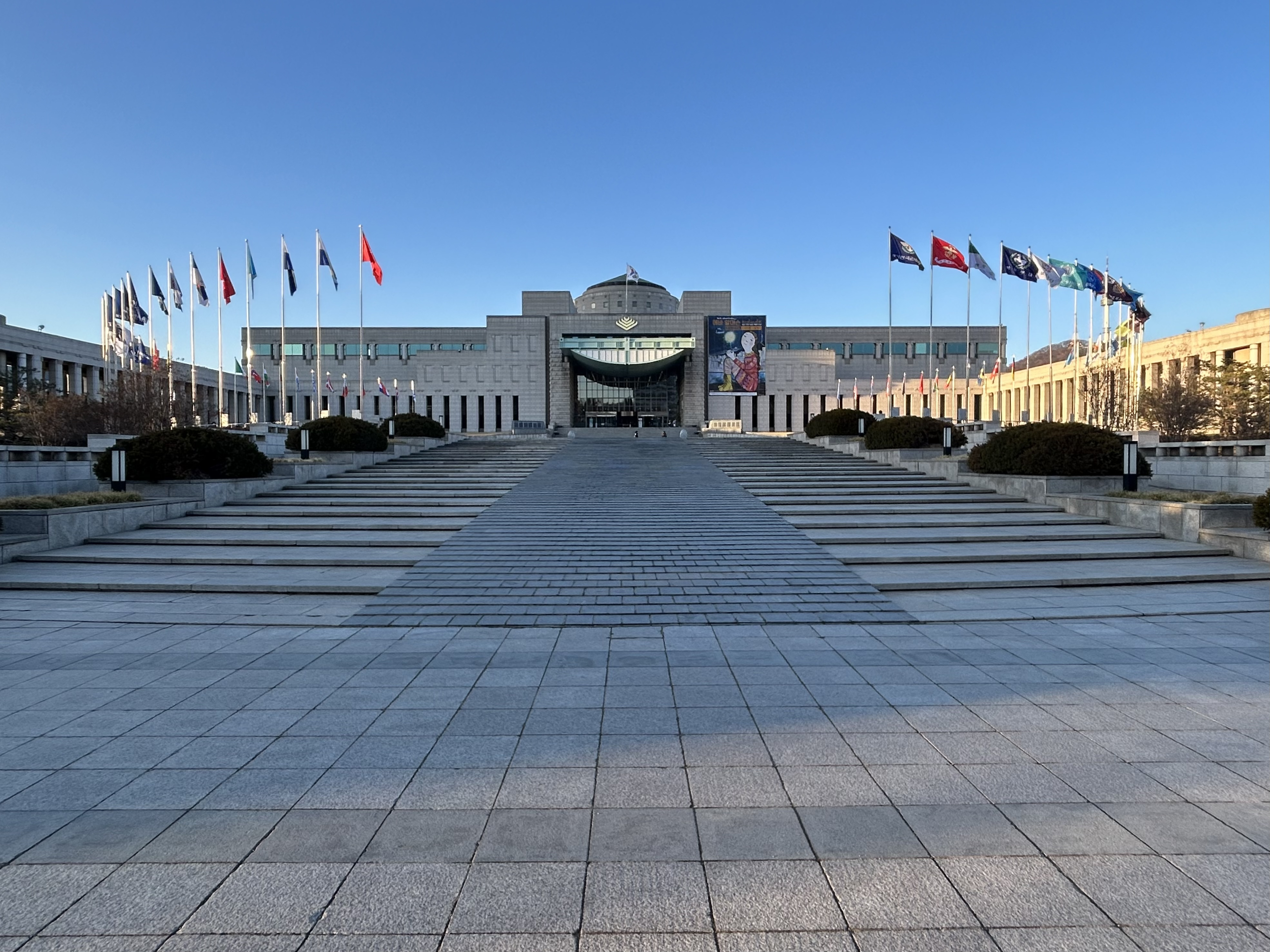
War Memorial of Korea

On June 25, 1950, North Korea invaded South Korea, sparking the Korean War, the Cold War's first major conflict, which continued until 1953. At the time, the Soviet Union had boycotted the UN, thus forfeiting their veto rights. This allowed the UN to intervene in a civil war when it became apparent that the superior North Korean forces would unify the entire country. The Soviet Union and China backed North Korea, with the later participation of millions of Chinese troops. After an ebb and flow that saw both sides facing defeat with massive losses among Korean civilians in both the north and the south, the war eventually reached a stalemate. During the war, Rhee's party promoted the One-People Principle, an effort to build an obedient citizenry through ethnic homogeneity and authoritarian appeals to nationalism.

The 1953 armistice, never signed by South Korea, split the peninsula along the demilitarized zone near the original demarcation line. No peace treaty was ever signed, resulting in the two countries remaining technically at war. Approximately 3 million people died in the Korean War, with a higher proportional civilian death toll than World War II or the Vietnam War, making it one of the deadliest conflicts of the Cold War era. In addition, virtually all of Korea's major cities were destroyed by the war.

=== Miracle on the Han River ===
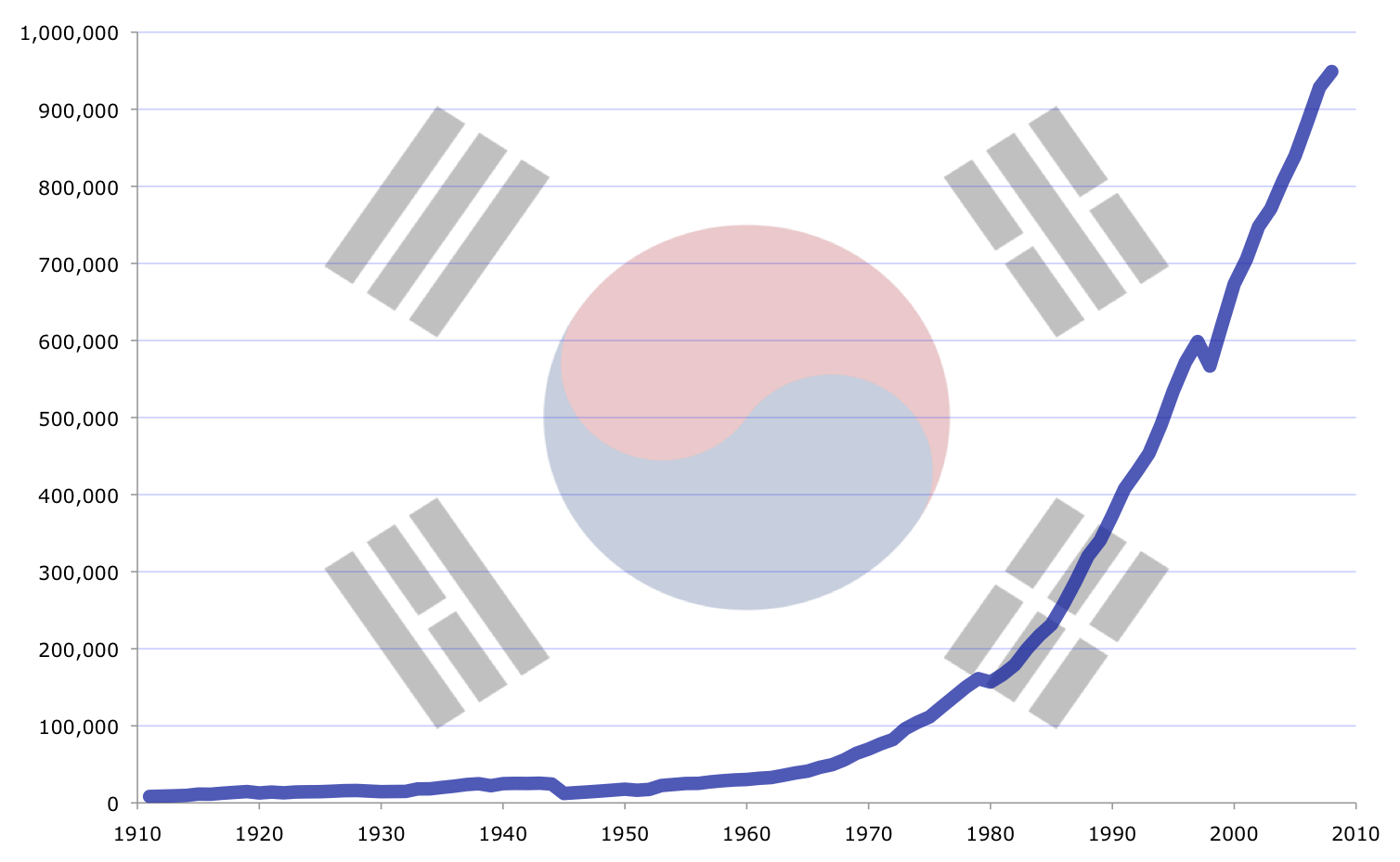
Between 1962 and 1994, the South Korean economy grew at an average of 10% annually, fueled by annual export growth of 20%, in a period called the Miracle on the Han River.

In 1960, a student uprising (the "April Revolution") led to the resignation of the autocratic President Syngman Rhee. This was followed by 13 months of political instability as South Korea was led by the weak and ineffectual Second Republic. This instability was broken by the May 16, 1961 coup led by General Park Chung Hee. As president, Park oversaw a period of rapid export-led economic growth enforced by political repression. Under Park, South Korea took an active role in the Vietnam War.

Park was heavily criticized as a ruthless military dictator who, in 1972, extended his rule by creating a new constitution, which gave the president dictatorial powers and permitted him to run for an unlimited number of six-year terms. The Korean economy developed significantly during Park's tenure, largely due to investment in family-run conglomerates. The government developed the nationwide expressway system, the Seoul subway system, and laid the foundation for economic development during his 17-year tenure, which ended with his assassination on 26 October 1979.

The years after Park's assassination were marked again by political turmoil, as the previously suppressed opposition leaders all campaigned to run for president in the sudden political void. In 1979, General Chun Doo-hwan led the coup d'état of December Twelfth. On May 17, 1980, Chun forced the Cabinet to expand martial law to the whole nation, which had previously not applied to Jeju Island. The expanded martial law closed universities, banned political activities, and further curtailed the press. Chun's assumption of the presidency through the events of May 17 triggered nationwide protests demanding democracy; these protests were particularly widespread in Gwangju, to which Chun sent special forces to violently suppress the 18–27 May 1980 Gwangju Democratization Movement at the cost of probably 500 to 2,000 civilian lives and 26 dead soldiers (half of them by friendly fire).

Chun subsequently created the National Defense Emergency Policy Committee and took the presidency according to his political plan. Chun and his government held South Korea under a despotic rule until 1987, when a Seoul National University student, Park Jong-chul, was tortured to death. On June 10, the Catholic Priests Association for Justice revealed the incident, igniting the June Democratic Struggle across the country. Eventually, Chun's party, the Democratic Justice Party, and its leader, Roh Tae-woo, announced the June 29 Declaration, which promised a democratic election of the president.

=== Democracy ===
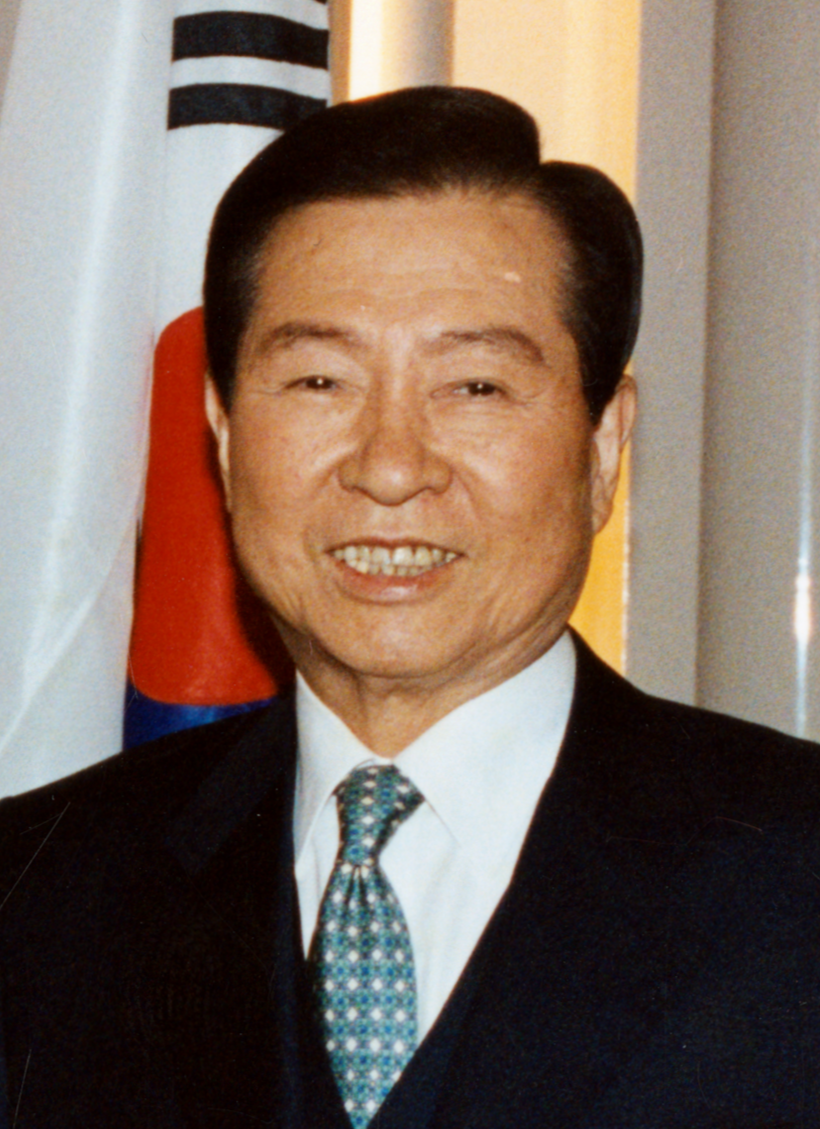
President Kim Dae-jung, the 2000 Nobel Peace Prize recipient for advancing democracy and human rights in South Korea and East Asia and for reconciliation with North Korea, was sometimes called the "Nelson Mandela of Asia".

Roh Tae-woo went on to win the 1987 election by a narrow margin against the two main opposition leaders, Kim Dae-jung and Kim Young-sam. Seoul hosted the Olympic Games in 1988, which was widely regarded as successful and a significant boost for South Korea's global image and economy.

South Korea was formally invited to become a member of the United Nations in 1991. The transition of Korea from autocracy to modern democracy was marked in 1997 by the election of Kim Dae-jung, who was sworn in as the eighth president of South Korea on February 25, 1998. His election was significant given that he had, in earlier years, been a political prisoner sentenced to death (later commuted to exile). He won against the backdrop of the 1997 Asian financial crisis, during which he took IMF advice to restructure the economy, and the nation soon recovered its economic growth, albeit at a slower pace.

In June 2000, as part of President Kim Dae-jung's "Sunshine Policy" of engagement, a North–South summit took place in Pyongyang, the capital of North Korea, now ruled by Kim Il Sung's son Kim Jong Il. Later that year, Kim received the Nobel Peace Prize "for his work for democracy and human rights in South Korea and in East Asia in general, and for peace and reconciliation with North Korea in particular". However, because of discontent among the population for fruitless approaches to the North under the previous administrations and, amid North Korean provocations, a conservative government was elected in 2007 led by President Lee Myung-bak, former mayor of Seoul. While South Korean and Japanese relations improved when they jointly co-hosted the 2002 FIFA World Cup, it later soured because of conflicting claims of sovereignty over the Liancourt Rocks.

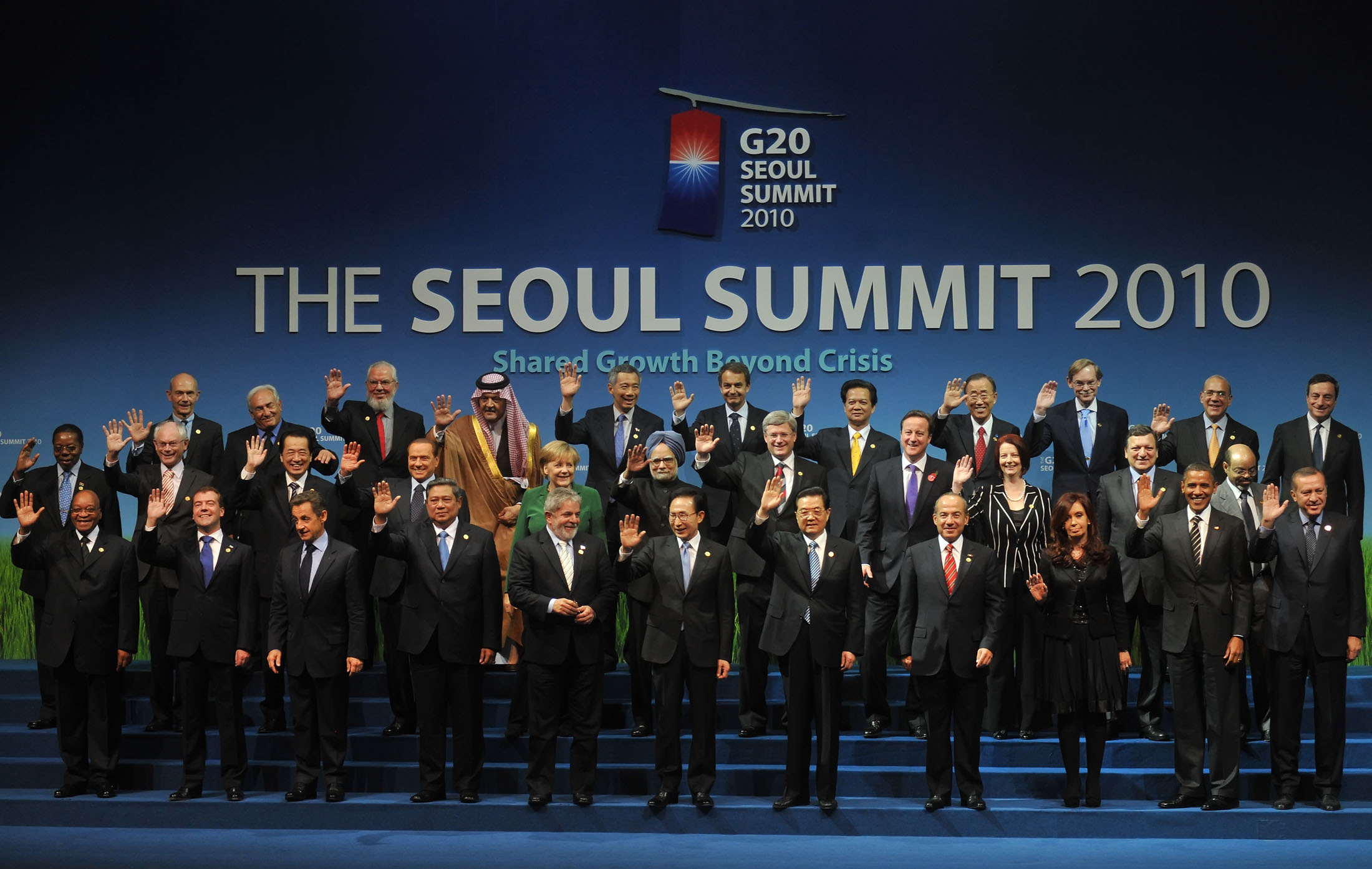
South Korea became the first non-G7 chair of the G-20 when it hosted the 2010 Seoul summit.

In 2010, there was an escalation in attacks by North Korea. In March 2010, the South Korean warship ROKS Cheonan was sunk killing 46 South Korean sailors, allegedly by a North Korean submarine. In November 2010, Yeonpyeongdo was attacked by a significant North Korean artillery barrage, with 4 people dying. The official UN report declined to explicitly name North Korea as the perpetrator of the Cheonan sinking. The lack of a strong response to these attacks from both South Korea and the international community caused significant anger among the South Korean public.

=== Contemporary history ===
The children of presidents Park Chung Hee and Kim Jong Il would take power in the two Koreas from 2011 to 2012. Kim Jong Un succeeded his father as leader of North Korea in 2011, while South Korea elected the first-ever female president Park Geun-hye in the 2012 election. The conservative Park Geun-hye administration was formally accused of corruption, bribery, and influence-peddling for the involvement of Park's close friend Choi Soon-sil in state affairs. There followed a series of nationwide public demonstrations from November 2016, and she was removed from office. After the fallout of Park's impeachment and dismissal, elections were held and Moon Jae-in of the Democratic Party won the presidency, immediately taking office on May 10, 2017. His tenure saw an improving political relationship with North Korea, some increasing divergence in the military alliance with the United States, and the successful hosting of the Winter Olympics in Pyeongchang. In April 2018, Park Geun-hye was sentenced to 24 years in jail and convicted of abuse of power and corruption. The COVID-19 pandemic caused South Korea to record more deaths than births, resulting in a population decline for the first time on record.

In March 2022, Yoon Suk Yeol, the candidate of the conservative opposition People Power Party, won a close election over Democratic Party candidate Lee Jae-myung by the narrowest margin in the history of the Sixth Republic and was sworn in on May 10, 2022. He declared martial law on December 3, 2024, accusing the opposition of being pro-North Korean and conducting anti-state activities. After several hours, the National Assembly voted to nullify the declaration in a unanimous vote of 190/0, causing Yoon to end martial law early on December 4. Yoon's actions resulted in his impeachment on December 14, 2024, followed by his unanimous removal from office on April 4, 2025. Lee Jae-myung won the election to succeed Yoon, immediately taking office on June 4, 2025.

== Geography ==
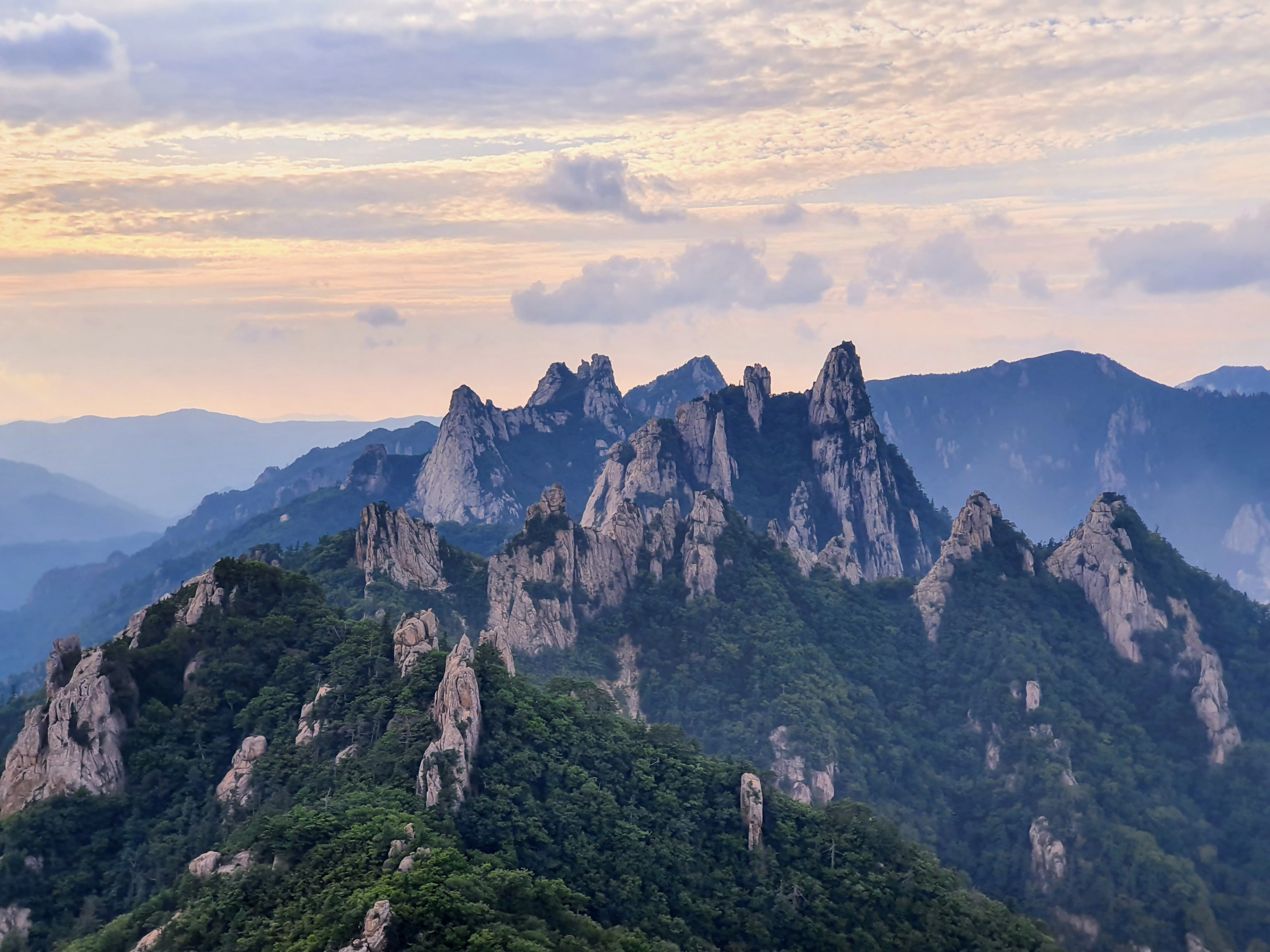
Dinosaur Ridge of Seoraksan, the highest mountain in the Taebaek mountain range in the Gangwon Province.

South Korea occupies the southern portion of the Korean Peninsula, which extends some 1,100 km (680 mi) from the Continental and East Asian mainland. This mountainous peninsula is flanked by the Yellow Sea to the west and the Sea of Japan to the east. Its southern tip lies on the Korea Strait and the East China Sea. The country, including all its islands, lies between latitudes 33° and 39°N, and longitudes 124° and 130°E. Its total area is 100,472.4 square kilometers (38,792.61 sq mi). South Korea can be divided into four general regions: an eastern region of high mountain ranges and narrow coastal plains; a western region of broad coastal plains, river basins, and rolling hills; a southwestern region of mountains and valleys; and a southeastern region dominated by the broad basin of the Nakdong River. South Korea is home to three terrestrial ecoregions: Central Korean deciduous forests, Manchurian mixed forests, and Southern Korea evergreen forests. South Korea's terrain is mostly mountainous, most of which is not arable. Lowlands, located primarily in the west and southeast, make up only 30% of the total land area. South Korea has 20 national parks and popular natural areas such as the Boseong Tea Fields, Suncheon Bay Ecological Park, and Jirisan.

About 3,000 islands lie off the western and southern coasts of South Korea, the vast majority small and uninhabited. Jeju Island, the country's largest island, is about 100 kilometers (62 miles) off the southern coast of South Korea. Hallasan, a dormant volcano, is South Korea's highest point and reaches 1,950 meters (6,400 feet) above sea level. The easternmost islands of South Korea are Ulleungdo and the Liancourt Rocks (Dokdo/Takeshima), while Marado and Socotra Rock are the southernmost islands of South Korea.

=== Climate ===
Seoul

Climate chart (precipitation, max. and min. temperature)
J	F	M	A	M	J	J	A	S	O	N	D
22 2 −6	24 4 −4	46 10 1	77 18 7	102 23 13	133 27 18	328 29 22	348 30 22	138 26 17	49 20 10	53 12 3	25 4 −3
- █ Average max. and min. temperatures in °C
- █ Precipitation totals in mm
Imperial conversion
J	F	M	A	M	J	J	A	S	O	N	D
0.9 35 21	0.9 39 25	1.8 50 34	3 64 45	4 73 55	5.2 80 64	13 84 71	14 85 72	5.4 78 62	1.9 67 50	2.1 53 37	1 40 26
- █ Average max. and min. temperatures in °F
- █ Precipitation totals in inches

South Korea tends to have a humid continental climate and a humid subtropical climate, and is affected by the East Asian monsoon, with precipitation heavier in summer during a short rainy season called jangma, which begins end of June and lasts through the end of July. In Seoul, the average January temperature range is −7 to 1 °C (19 to 34 °F), and the average August temperature range is 22 to 30 °C (72 to 86 °F). Winter temperatures are higher along the southern coast and considerably lower in the mountainous interior. Summer can be uncomfortably hot and humid, with temperatures exceeding 30 °C (86 °F) in most parts of the country. South Korea has four distinct seasons; spring, summer, autumn and winter. Spring usually lasts from late March to early May, summer from mid-May to early September, autumn from mid-September to early November, and winter from mid-November to mid-March.

Rainfall is concentrated in the summer months of June through September. The southern coast is subject to late summer typhoons that bring strong winds, heavy rains and sometimes floods. The average annual precipitation varies from 1,370 millimeters (54 in) in Seoul to 1,470 millimeters (58 in) in Busan.

=== Environment ===
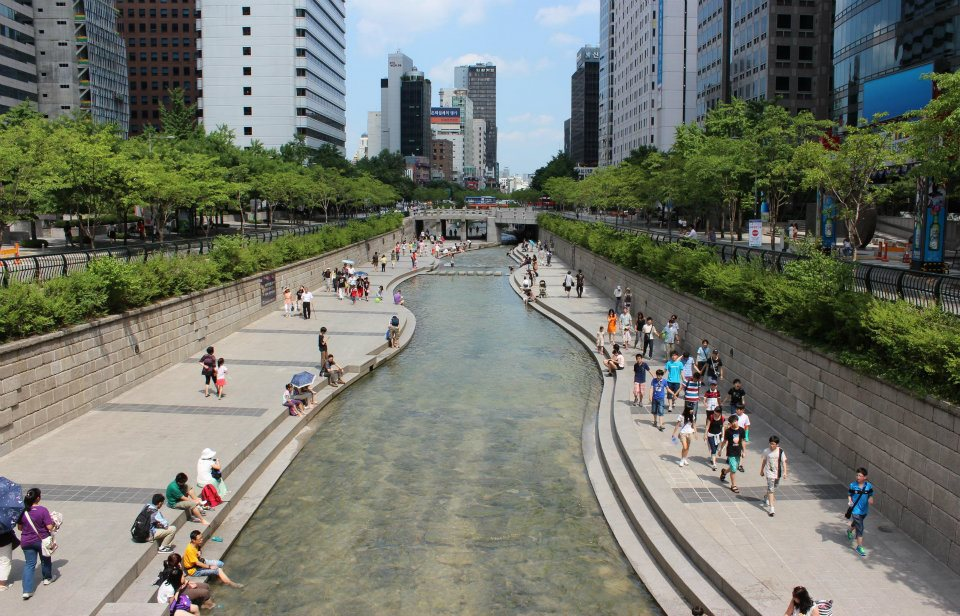
Cheonggyecheon river is a modern public recreation space in downtown Seoul

During the first 20 years of South Korea's growth surge, little effort was made to preserve the environment. Unchecked industrialization and urban development have resulted in deforestation and destruction of wetlands such as the Songdo Tidal Flat. However, there have been recent efforts to balance these problems, including a government run $84 billion five-year green growth project that aims to boost energy efficiency and green technology.

The climate initiative utilizes nearly two percent of the national GDP and facilitates creation of a nationwide bike network, solar and wind energy, decreasing combustion vehicles, backing daylight saving time and replacing obsolete lighting products in favor of environmentally friendly technologies such as LEDs. The country plans to build a nationwide next-generation network that will be 10 times faster than broadband facilities, in order to reduce energy usage.

The renewable portfolio standard program with renewable energy certificates runs from 2012 to 2022. Quota systems favor large, vertically integrated generators and multinational electric utilities because certificates are generally denominated in units of one megawatt-hour. They are also more difficult to design and implement than a feed-in tariff. Around 350 residential micro combined heat and power units were installed in 2012. In 2017, South Korea was the world's seventh largest emitter of carbon emissions and the fifth largest emitter per capita. President Moon Jae-in pledged to reduce greenhouse gas emissions to zero in 2050.

Seoul's tap water recently became safe to drink, with city officials branding it "Arisu" in a bid to convince the public. Efforts have also been made with afforestation projects; South Korea had a 2019 Forest Landscape Integrity Index mean score of 6.02/10, ranking it 87th globally out of 172 countries. Another multibillion-dollar project was the restoration of Cheonggyecheon, a stream running through downtown Seoul that had previously been paved over by a motorway. One major challenge is air quality, with acid rain, sulfur oxides, and annual yellow dust storms; however, many of these difficulties are a result of South Korea's proximity to China, which is a major air polluter.

South Korea is a member of the Antarctic-Environmental Protocol, Antarctic Treaty, Biodiversity Treaty, Kyoto Protocol (forming the Environmental Integrity Group (EIG), regarding UNFCCC, with Mexico and Switzerland), Desertification, Endangered Species, Environmental Modification, Hazardous Wastes, Law of the Sea, Marine Dumping, Comprehensive Nuclear-Test-Ban Treaty (not into force), Ozone Layer Protection, Ship Pollution, Tropical Timber 83, Tropical Timber 94, Wetlands, and Whaling.

== Government and politics ==
Lee Jae Myung; President	Han Seong-sook; Prime Minister

The South Korean government's structure is determined by the Constitution of the Republic of Korea. Like many democratic states, South Korea has a government divided into three branches: executive, judicial, and legislative. The executive and legislative branches operate primarily at the national level, although various ministries in the executive branch also carry out local functions. The judicial branch operates at both the national and local levels. Local governments are semi-autonomous and contain executive and legislative bodies of their own. South Korea is a constitutional democracy.

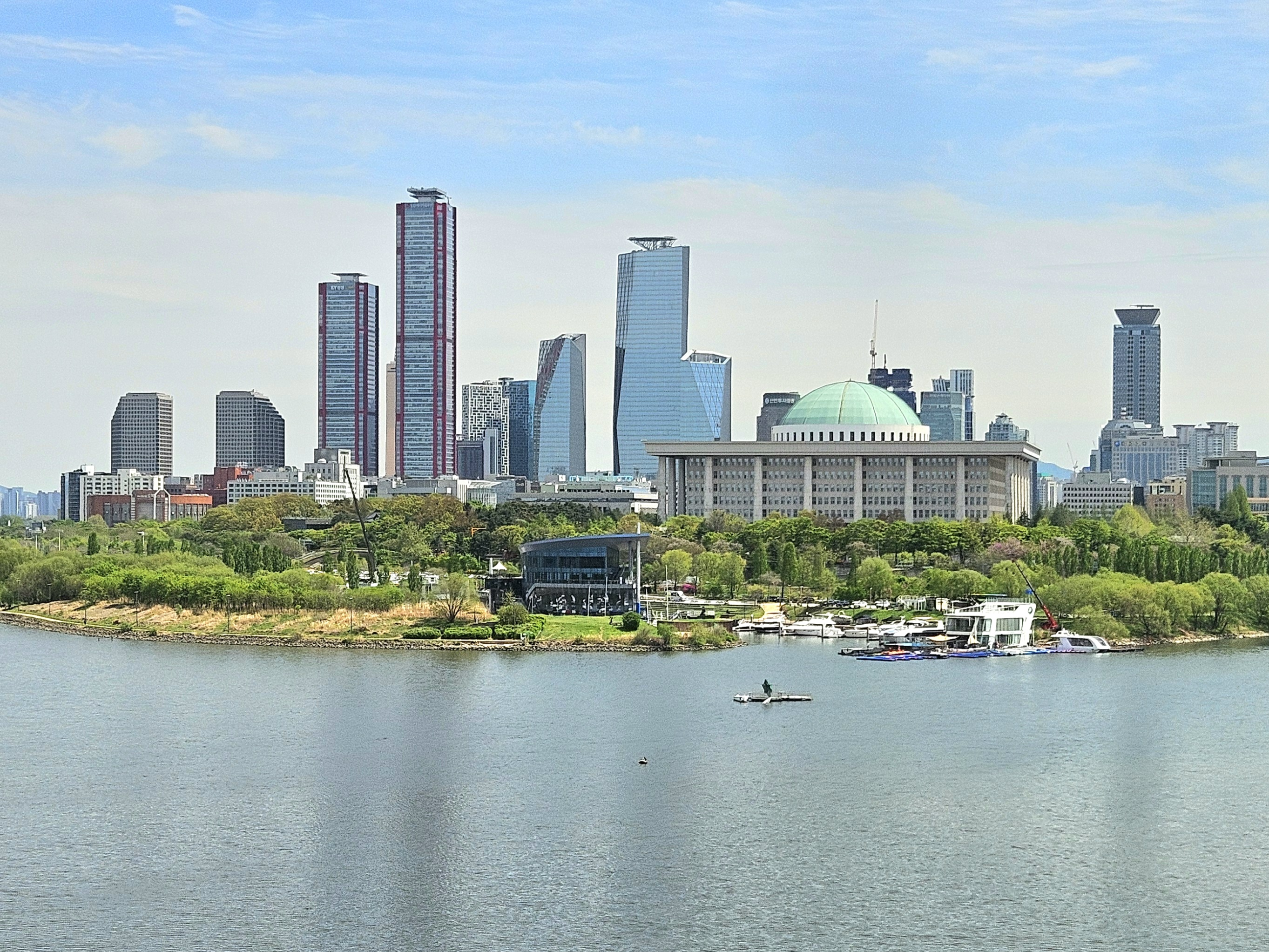
Panoramic view of Yeouido and the National Assembly building from Dangsan Railway Bridge.

The constitution has been revised several times since its first promulgation in 1948 at independence. However, it has retained many broad characteristics, and with the exception of the short-lived Second Republic of Korea, the country has always had a presidential system with an independent chief executive. Under its current constitution, the state is sometimes referred to as the Sixth Republic of South Korea. The first direct election was also held in 1948. South Korean politics is broadly divided into the liberal camp, currently represented chiefly by the Democratic Party, and the conservative camp, represented by the People Power Party.

Although South Korea experienced a series of military dictatorships from the 1960s until the 1980s, it has since developed into a successful liberal democracy. Today, The World Factbook describes South Korea's democracy as a "fully functioning modern democracy", while The Economist Democracy Index classifies it as a "flawed democracy", ranking at 32nd out of 167 countries in 2024. According to the V-Dem Democracy indices, South Korea is the 46th most electoral democratic country in the world as of 2024. However, some political experts argued that South Korea had experienced democratic backsliding and the reemergence of authoritarianism, particularly under the presidency of Yoon Suk Yeol, which culminated when he declared martial law for the first time since the 1980 military coup d'état after the assassination of dictator Park Chung Hee, and the first since democratization in 1987. South Korea is ranked 31st on the Corruption Perceptions Index (7th in the Asia–Pacific region), with a score of 63 out of 100.

=== Administrative divisions ===
The major administrative divisions in South Korea are ten provinces, (Note: South Korea claims five of its provinces that are controlled by North Korea, which it does not control, along with the two portions of its northern provinces controlled by North Korea. These are overseen by the Committee for the Five Northern Korean Provinces.) three special self-governing provinces, five metropolitan cities (self-governing cities that are not part of any province), one special city, one special metropolitan city and one special self-governing city.

Map	Name (city/province)	Hangul	Hanja	Population^{c}
	Special city (Teukbyeol-si)^{a}			
	Seoul	서울특별시	서울特別市^{b}	9,830,452
Special metropolitan city (Tonghap-teukbyeol-si)^{a}
	Jeonnam–Gwangju	전남광주통합특별시	全南光州統合特別市	3,351,384
Metropolitan city (Gwangyeok-si)^{a}
	Busan	부산광역시	釜山廣域市	3,460,707
	Daegu	대구광역시	大邱廣域市	2,471,136
	Incheon	인천광역시	仁川廣域市	2,952,476
	Daejeon	대전광역시	大田廣域市	1,496,123
	Ulsan	울산광역시	蔚山廣域市	1,161,303
Special self-governing city (Teukbyeol-jachi-si)^{a}
	Sejong	세종특별자치시	世宗特別自治市	295,041
Province (Do)^{a}
	Gyeonggi^{e}	경기도	京畿道	12,941,604
	North Chungcheong	충청북도	忠淸北道	1,595,164
	South Chungcheong	충청남도	忠淸南道	2,120,666
	North Gyeongsang	경상북도	慶尙北道	2,682,897
	South Gyeongsang	경상남도	慶尙南道	3,377,126
Special self-governing province (Teukbyeol-jachi-do)^{a}
	Jeju	제주특별자치도	濟州特別自治道	661,511
	Gangwon^{e}	강원특별자치도	江原特別自治道	1,545,452
	North Jeolla	전북특별자치도	全北特別自治道	1,847,089
Claimed Province but not controlled (North Korea)
	North Hamgyeong	함경북도	咸鏡北道	—
	South Hamgyeong	함경남도	咸鏡南道	—
	North Pyeongan	평안북도	平安北道	—
	South Pyeongan	평안남도	平安南道	—
	Hwanghae	황해도	黃海道	—

^{a} Revised Romanisation; ^{b} See Names of Seoul; ^{c} As of May 2018, does not include population in territory controlled by North Korea.; ^{d} Areas that belong to the territory under the Constitution of the Republic of Korea but have not been recovered. ^{e} Partially controlled by North Korea.

=== Foreign relations ===
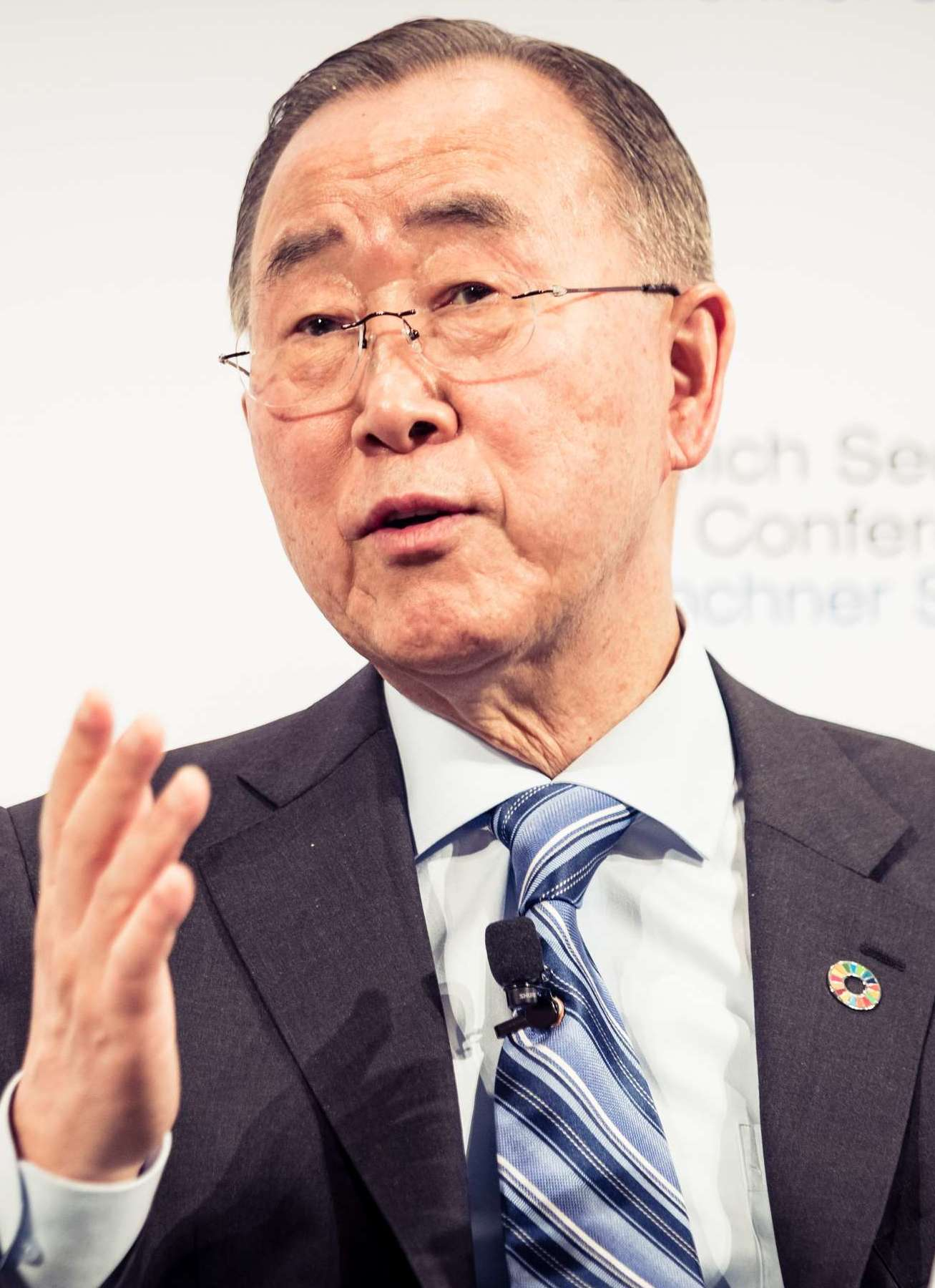
Former Secretary-General of the United Nations (2007–2016), Ban Ki-moon

South Korea has been a member of the United Nations since 1991, when it became a member state at the same time as North Korea. South Korea has developed links with the Association of Southeast Asian Nations as both a member of ASEAN Plus three, a body of observers, and the East Asia Summit (EAS).

A close relationship with the United States began directly after World War II, when the United States temporarily administered South Korea. Upon the onset of the Korean War in 1950, U.S. forces were sent to defend against an invasion from North Korea of the South and subsequently fought as the largest contributor of UN troops. Following the Armistice, South Korea and the U.S. agreed to a "Mutual Defense Treaty", under which an attack on either party in the Pacific area would summon a response from both. The two nations also share a close economic relationship,

Historically, Korea had close relations with the dynasties in China, and some Korean kingdoms were members of the Imperial Chinese tributary system. The Korean kingdoms also ruled over some Chinese kingdoms, including the Khitan people and the Manchurians, before the Qing dynasty, and received tributes from them. Though at opposing sides during the Cold War, South Korean–Chinese relations have improved steadily since 1992. China has become South Korea's largest trading partner by far.

Korea and Japan have had ties since ancient times but also significant cultural exchange, with Korea acting as the gateway between East Asia and Japan. Longstanding issues such as historical disputes over Japan's 35-year colonization of Korea in the 20th century and Japanese war crimes against Korean civilians, the territorial disputes over the Liancourt Rocks, known in South Korea as "Dokdo" and in Japan as "Takeshima", and visits by Japanese politicians to the Yasukuni Shrine continue to trouble Korean-Japanese relations. Ties between the two countries have improved significantly in the 2020s, and polls show that public perceptions of each other have become much more positive, especially among younger generations. Japan is today South Korea's third largest trading partner.

==== North Korea ====
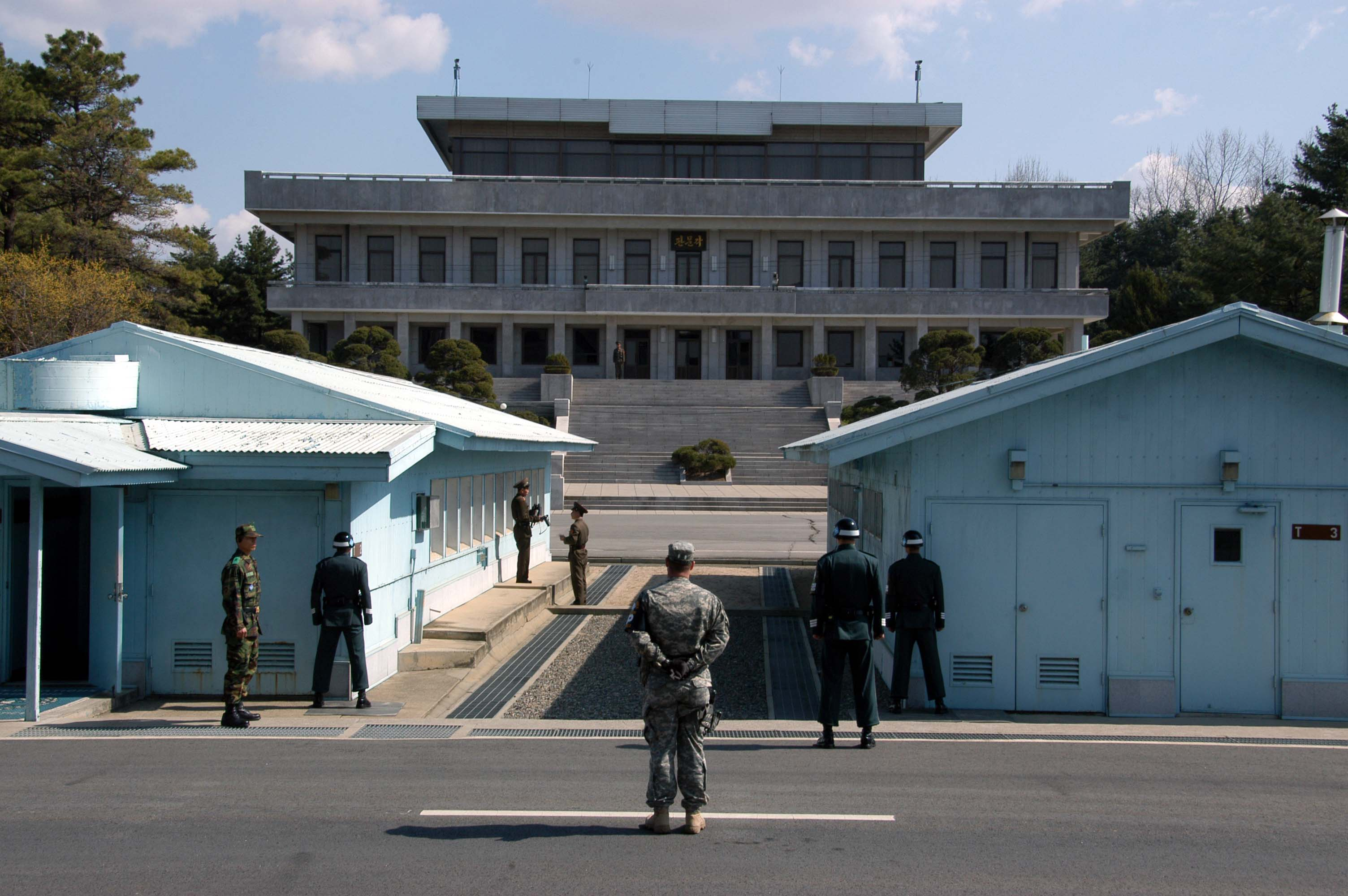
The Joint Security Area

South Korea claims complete sovereignty over the entire peninsula and outlying islands. North and South Korea are still technically at war (having never signed a peace treaty after the Korean War) and share the world's most heavily fortified border. Despite mutual animosity, reconciliation efforts have continued since the initial separation between North and South Korea. During the late 1990s and 2000s, South Korea pursued the Sunshine Policy, promoting improved ties with North Korea.

Despite the Sunshine Policy and efforts at reconciliation, the progress was complicated by North Korean missile tests in 1993, 1998, 2006, 2009, and 2013. By early 2009, relationships between North and South Korea were very tense; North Korea had been reported to have deployed missiles, ended its former agreements with South Korea, and threatened South Korea and the United States not to interfere with a satellite launch it had planned. Relations improved in the late 2010s but deteriorated again in the 2020s. In 2024, in response to increasing tensions, North Korea abandoned peaceful reunification plans and labeled South Korea as the most hostile country to North Korea.

=== Military ===
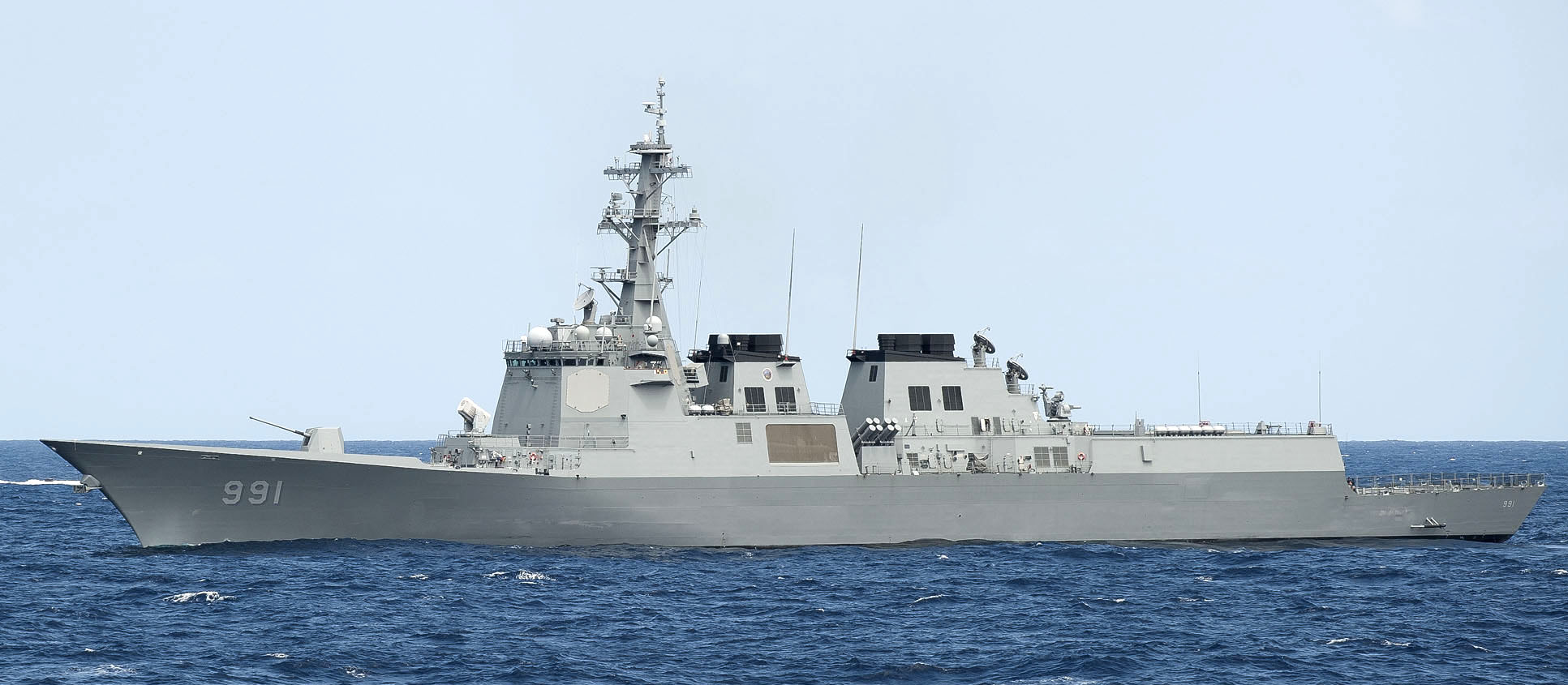
ROKN Sejong the Great, a Sejong the Great-class guided-missile destroyer built by Hyundai Heavy Industries

Unresolved tension with North Korea has prompted South Korea to allocate 2.6% of its GDP and 13.2% of all government spending to its military (government share of GDP: 14.967%), while maintaining compulsory conscription for men. Consequently, the ROK Armed Forces is one of the largest and most powerful standing armed forces in the world with a reported personnel strength of 3,600,000 in 2022 (500,000 active and 3,100,000 reserve).

The South Korean military consists of the Army (ROKA), the Navy (ROKN), the Air Force (ROKAF), and the Marine Corps (ROKMC), and reserve forces. Many of these forces are concentrated near the Korean Demilitarized Zone. All South Korean males are constitutionally required to serve in the military, typically for 18 months. In addition, the Korean Augmentation to the United States Army is a branch of the Republic of Korea Army that consists of Korean enlisted personnel who are augmented to the Eighth United States Army. In 2010, South Korea spent ₩1.68 trillion in a cost-sharing agreement with the U.S. to provide budgetary support to the U.S. forces in Korea, on top of the ₩29.6 trillion budget for its own military.

From time to time, South Korea has sent its troops overseas to assist American forces. It has participated in most major conflicts that the United States has been involved in over the past 50 years. South Korea dispatched 325,517 troops to fight in the Vietnam War, with a peak strength of 50,000. In 2004, South Korea sent 3,300 troops of the Zaytun Division to help rebuilding in northern Iraq, and was the third largest contributor in the coalition forces after the U.S. and Britain. Beginning in 2001, South Korea had deployed 24,000 troops in the Middle East region to support the war on terror.

The right to conscientious objection was not recognized in South Korea until recently. Over 400 men were typically imprisoned at any given time for refusing military service for political or religious reasons in the years before the right to conscientious objection was established. On June 28, 2018, the South Korean Constitutional Court ruled the Military Service Act unconstitutional and ordered the government to accommodate civilian forms of military service for conscientious objectors. On November 1, 2018, the South Korean Supreme Court legalized conscientious objection as a basis for rejecting compulsory military service.

==== United States contingent ====
There is a substantial United States military presence in South Korea. There are approximately 28,500 U.S. military personnel stationed in South Korea, most of them serving one-year unaccompanied tours. The U.S. troops, which are primarily ground and air units, are assigned to United States Forces Korea and mainly assigned to the Eighth Army, Seventh Air Force, and Naval Forces Korea. They are stationed in installations at Osan, Kunsan, Yongsan, Dongducheon, Sungbuk, Camp Humphreys, and Daegu, as well as at Camp Bonifas in the DMZ Joint Security Area.

A fully functioning UN Command is at the top of the chain of command of all forces in South Korea, including the U.S. forces and the entire South Korean military – if a sudden escalation of war between North and South Korea were to occur, the United States would assume control of the South Korean armed forces in all military and paramilitary moves. There has been a long-term agreement between the United States and South Korea that South Korea should eventually assume the lead for its own defense. This transition to a South Korean command has been slow and often postponed, although it is currently scheduled to occur in the 2020s.

== Economy ==
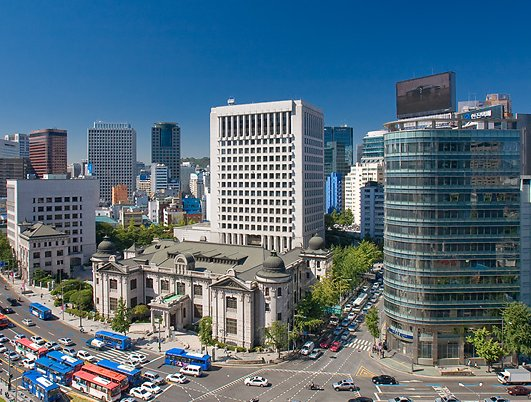
The Bank of Korea, the central bank of South Korea and issuer of the South Korean won

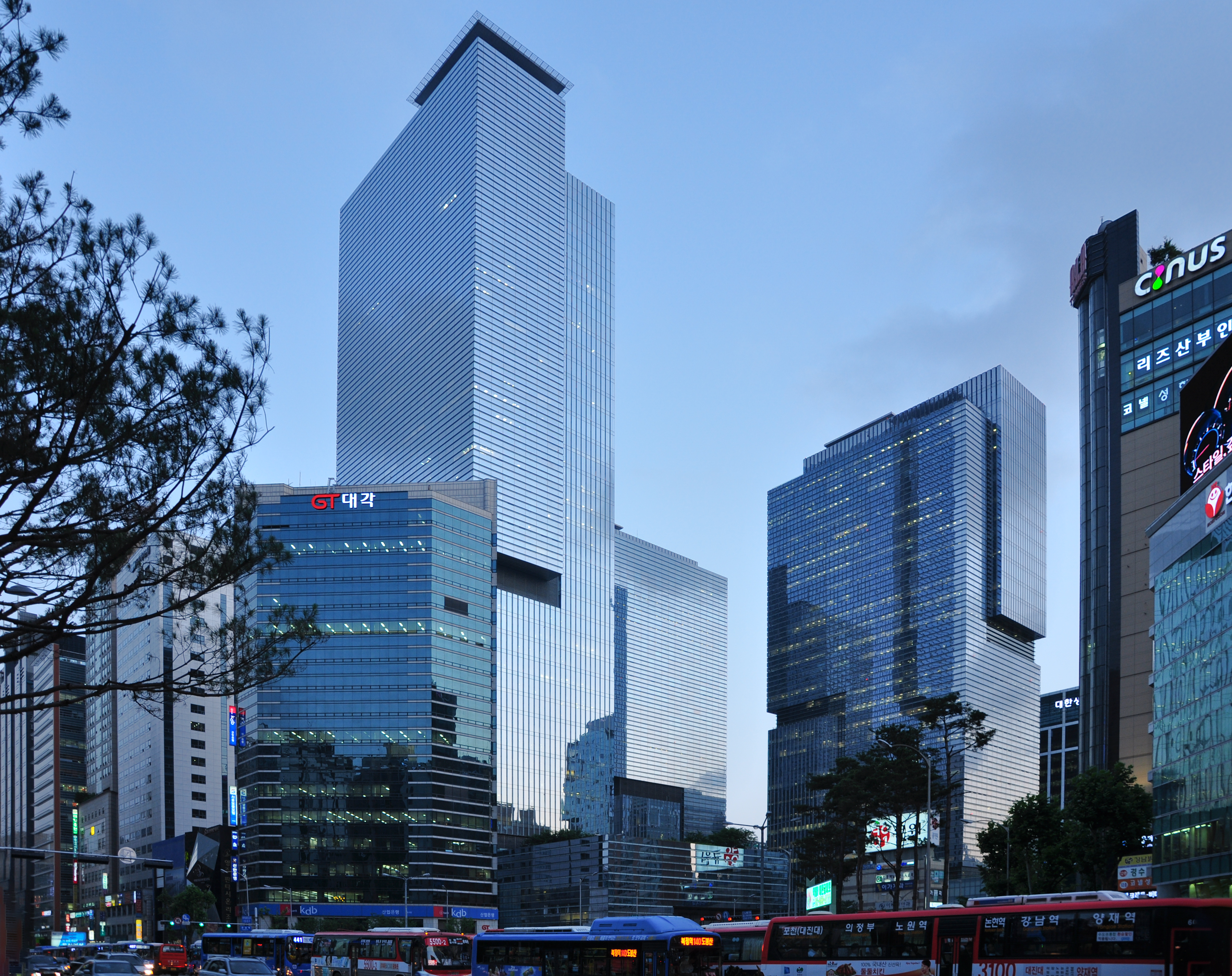
The Samsung headquarters in Samsung Town, located in Seocho District, Seoul

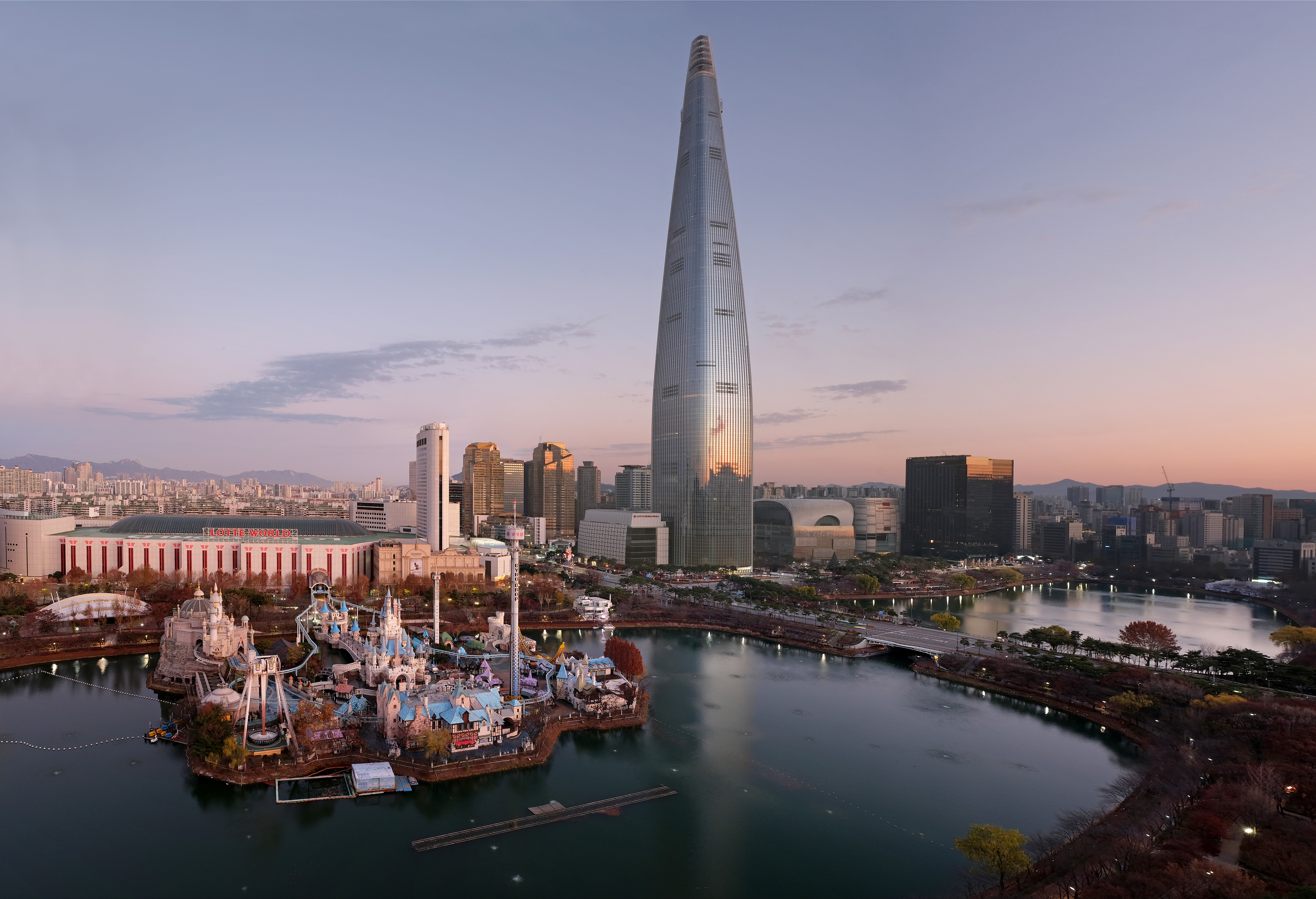
The Lotte World Tower in Songpa District, Seoul, is the tallest building in South Korea and the 6th tallest in the world.

South Korea's mixed economy is the 14th-largest by nominal GDP and the 14th-largest GDP by purchasing power parity in the world, identifying it as one of the G20 major economies. It is a developed country with a high-income economy and is the most industrialized member country of the OECD. South Korean brands such as LG Electronics and Samsung are internationally famous and have garnered South Korea's reputation for its high-quality electronics and other manufactured goods. South Korea became a member of the OECD in 1996.

Its massive investment in education has taken the country from mass illiteracy to a major international technological powerhouse. The country's national economy benefits from a highly skilled workforce and is among the most educated countries in the world, with one of the highest percentages of its citizens holding a tertiary education degree. South Korea's economy was one of the world's fastest-growing from the early 1960s to the late 1990s, and was still one of the fastest-growing developed countries in the 2000s, along with Hong Kong, Singapore and Taiwan, the other three Asian Tigers. It recorded the fastest rise in average GDP per capita in the world between 1980 and 1990. South Koreans refer to this growth as the Miracle on the Han River. The South Korean economy is heavily dependent on international trade, and in 2014, South Korea was the fifth-largest exporter and seventh-largest importer in the world. In addition, the country has one of the world's largest foreign-exchange reserves. South Korea's economy relies significantly on semiconductor and other AI-related gear exports, which account for around 40% of its total exports. The ratio of South Korea's exports to GDP is 46%. Consumption, by contrast, plays a relatively small role, accounting for 40% of South Korea's GDP.

Despite the economy's high growth potential and apparent structural stability, the country suffers damage to its credit rating in the stock market because of the belligerence of North Korea in times of deep military crises, which has an adverse effect on its financial markets. Additionally, economic growth is increasingly concentrated in a small number of tech-related companies, with smaller businesses that account for 60% of employment seeing slower growth, while the country faces economic competition from China. The International Monetary Fund compliments the resilience of the economy against various economic crises, citing low state debt and high fiscal reserves that can quickly be mobilized to address financial emergencies. Although it was severely harmed by the 1997 Asian financial crisis, the country managed a rapid recovery and subsequently tripled its GDP. Furthermore, South Korea was one of the few developed countries that was able to avoid a recession during the 2008 financial crisis.

=== Transportation ===
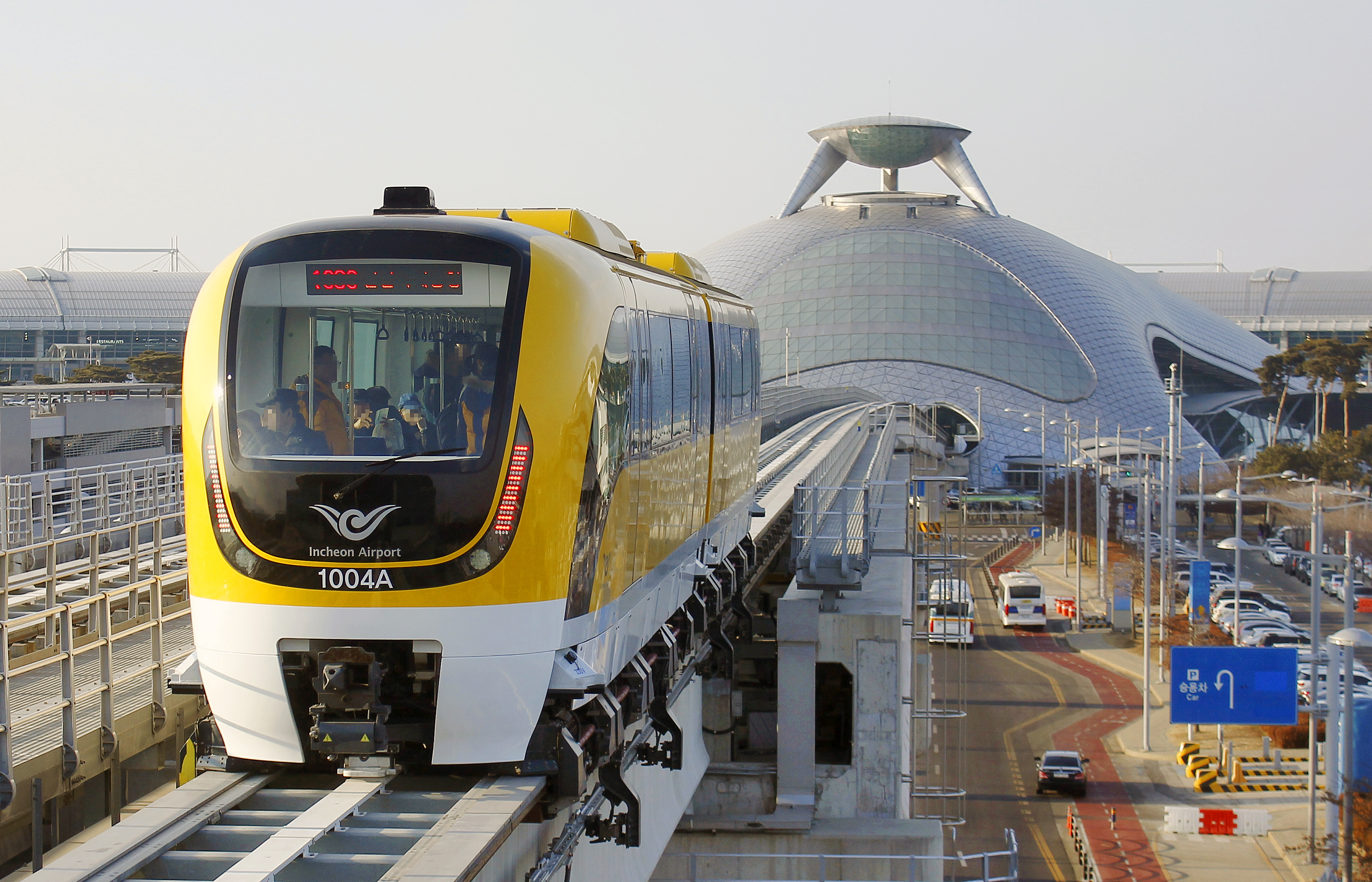
Incheon International Airport's Maglev station

South Korea has a technologically advanced transport network consisting of high-speed railways, highways, bus routes, ferry services, and air routes that crisscross the country. Korea Expressway Corporation operates the toll highways and service amenities en route. Korail provides train services to all major South Korean cities. Two rail lines, the Gyeongui and Donghae Bukbu Lines, to North Korea are being reconnected. The Korean high-speed rail system, Korea Train Express (KTX), provides high-speed service along the Gyeongbu and Honam Lines. Major cities such as Seoul, Busan, and Daegu have urban rapid transit systems. Express bus terminals are available in most cities.

The main gateway and largest airport is Incheon International Airport, serving 58 million passengers in 2016. Other international airports include the Gimpo, Busan and Jeju airports. There are also many airports that were built as part of the infrastructure boom but are barely used. The national carrier Korean Air served over 26 million passengers, including almost 19 million international passengers in 2016. Asiana Airlines also serves domestic and international traffic. Combined, South Korean airlines serve 297 international routes. Smaller airlines, such as Jeju Air, provide domestic service with lower fares.

=== Energy ===
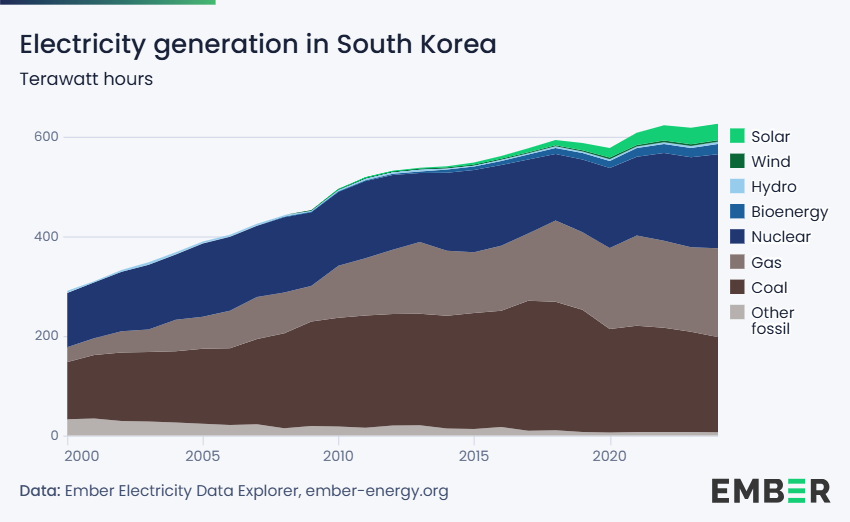
Electricity generation in South Korea in terawatt hours

South Korea is the world's fifth-largest nuclear power producer and the third-largest in Asia as of 2010. Supplying 45% of its electricity production, nuclear research is very active with research into a variety of advanced reactors, including small modular reactors, liquid-metal fast/transmutation reactors and high-temperature hydrogen generation reactors. Fuel production and waste handling technologies have also been developed locally. It is also a member of the ITER project.

South Korea is an emerging exporter of nuclear reactors, having concluded agreements with the United Arab Emirates to build and maintain four advanced nuclear reactors, with Jordan for a research nuclear reactor, and with Argentina for construction and repair of heavy-water nuclear reactors. As of 2010, South Korea and Turkey are in negotiations regarding construction of two nuclear reactors. South Korea is also preparing to bid on construction of a light-water nuclear reactor for Argentina.

South Korea is not allowed to enrich uranium or develop traditional uranium enrichment technology on its own due to U.S. political pressure, unlike most major nuclear powers such as Japan, Germany, and France, competitors in the international nuclear market. This impediment to South Korea's indigenous nuclear industrial undertaking has sparked occasional diplomatic rows between the two allies. While successful in exporting its electricity-generating nuclear technology and nuclear reactors, it cannot capitalize on the market for nuclear enrichment facilities and refineries, preventing it from further expanding its export niche. South Korea has sought unique technologies, such as pyroprocessing, to circumvent these obstacles and gain a more advantageous competitive edge. The U.S. has recently been wary of the burgeoning nuclear program, which South Korea insists will be for civilian use only.

South Korea is the 2nd-highest-ranked Continental Asian country in the World Economic Forum's Networked Readiness Index, after Singapore—an indicator of a country's information and communication technology development level. South Korea ranks 9th worldwide.

=== Tourism ===
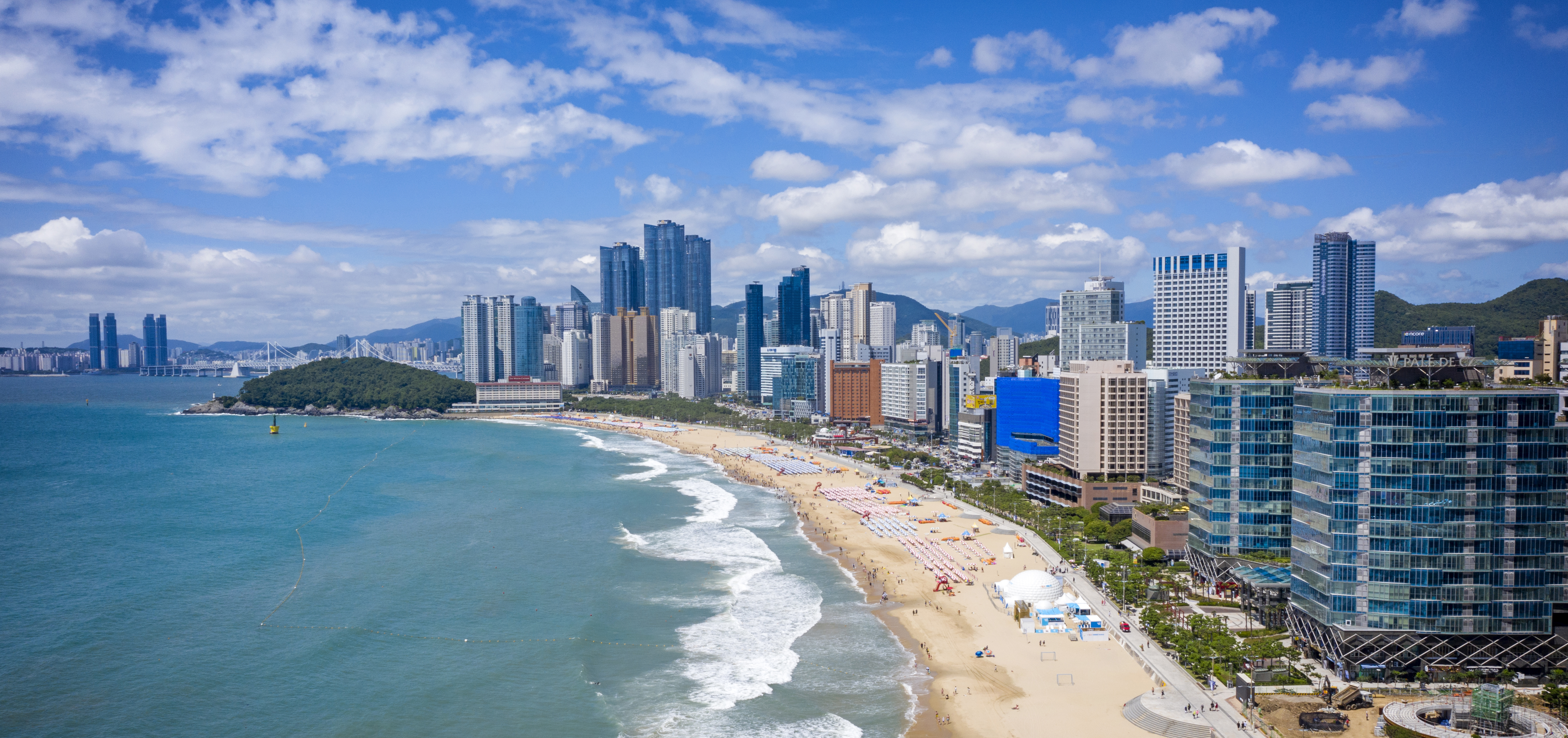
Busan City Haeundae Beach

South Korean tourism is driven by many factors, including the prominence of Korean pop culture such as South Korean pop music and television dramas, known as the Korean Wave or Hallyu, has gained popularity throughout the world. The Hyundai Research Institute reported that the Korean Wave has a direct influence on encouraging direct foreign investment back into the country through demand for products and the tourism industry. Among East Asian countries, China was the most receptive, investing $1.4 billion in South Korea, with much of the investment within its service sector, a sevenfold increase from 2001. In 2019, more than 17 million foreign tourists visited South Korea.

According to an analysis by economist Han Sang-Wan, a 1% increase in the exports of Korean cultural content pushes consumer goods exports up 0.083%, while a 1% increase in Korean pop content exports to a country produces a 0.019% bump in tourism.

Some private establishments in South Korea, particularly nightlife venues, maintain policies that restrict entry to Korean nationals or explicitly prohibit foreigners. Numerous reports have documented signs at bars and clubs stating "Koreans only" or "No foreigners allowed".

=== Welfare ===
Compared to other OECD members, South Korea spends less on welfare systems. The South Korean pension system was created to provide benefits to persons reaching old age, families, and persons stricken with the death of their primary breadwinner, and for the purposes of stabilizing the nation's welfare state. The structure is primarily based on taxation and is income-related. The system is divided into four categories distributing benefits to participants through national, military personnel, governmental, and private school teacher pension schemes. The national pension scheme is the primary welfare system providing allowances to the majority of persons. Eligibility for the national pension scheme is not dependent on income but on age and residence, with those aged 18 to 59 covered. Anyone under 18 is a dependent of someone who is covered or under a special exclusion where they are allowed to alternative provisions. The national pension scheme is divided into four categories of insured persons: the workplace-based insured, the individually insured, the voluntarily insured, and the voluntarily and continuously insured. An old-age pension scheme covers individuals age 60 or older for the rest of their lives as long as they have satisfied the minimum of 20 years of national pension coverage beforehand.

=== Science and technology ===
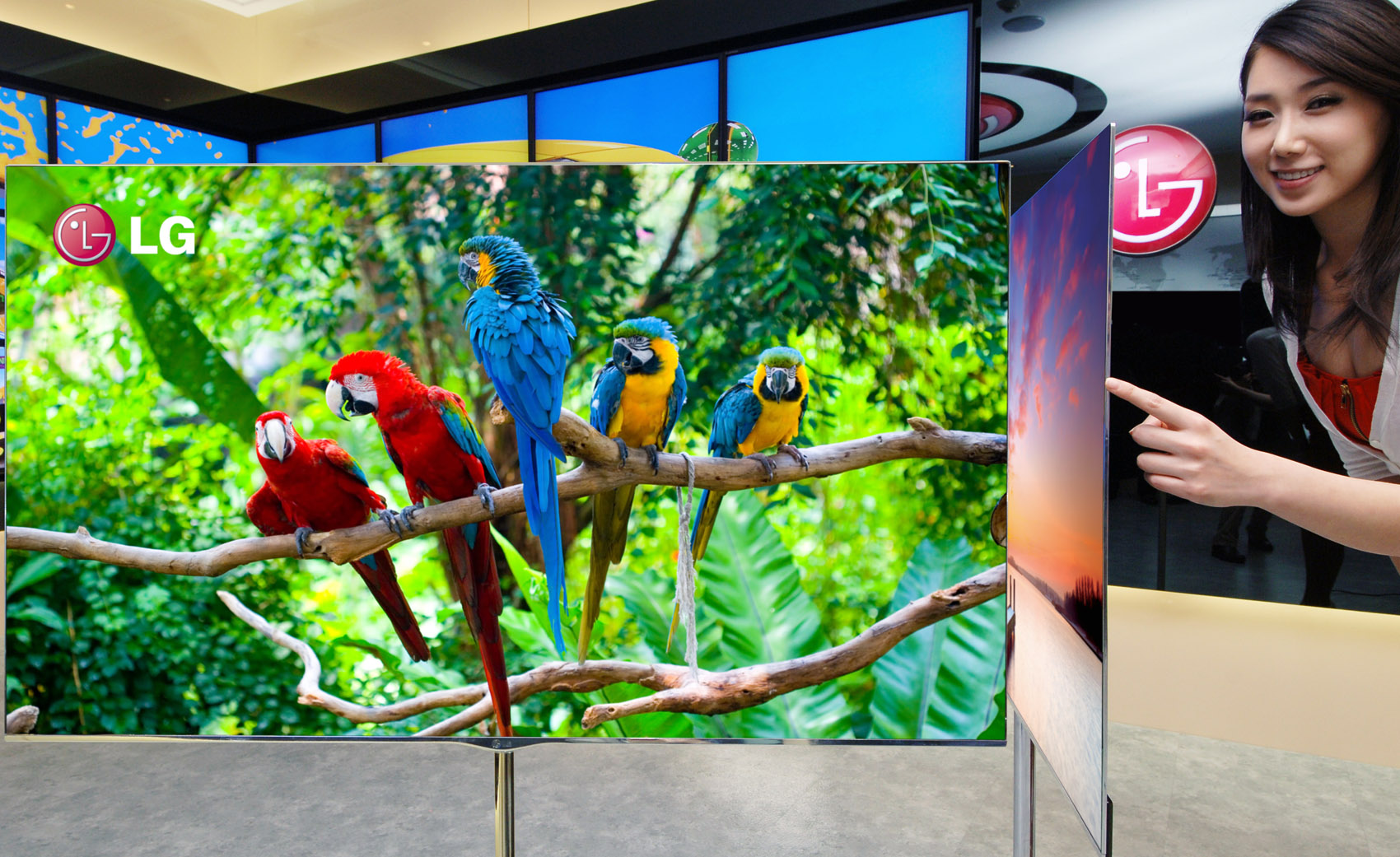
A 3D OLED TV made by Korean LG Display, the world's largest LCD and OLED maker

Scientific and technological development in South Korea initially did not occur largely because of more pressing matters, such as the division of Korea and the Korean War that occurred right after its independence. It was not until the 1960s under the dictatorship of Park Chung Hee that South Korea's economy rapidly grew from industrialization and the chaebol corporations such as Samsung, LG, and SK. Ever since the industrialization of South Korea's economy, South Korea has placed its focus on technology-based corporations, which have been supported by infrastructure developments by the government.

South Korea leads the OECD in graduates in science and engineering. From 2014 to 2019, the country ranked first among the most innovative countries in the Bloomberg Innovation Index. It was ranked 4th in the Global Innovation Index in 2025, and remained in the same position in the index of 2026. South Korea today is known as a launchpad of a mature mobile market that allows developers to reap benefits of a market where very few technology constraints exist. There is a growing trend of inventions of new types of media or apps, utilizing the 4G and 5G internet infrastructure in South Korea. South Korea has the infrastructure to meet a high density of population and culture; this, along with high revenues, allows South Korean-only tech startups to reach valuations of $1 billion and above, a peak usually reserved for startups growing in several countries.

Total spending on research and development grew from about 3.9% of gross domestic product (GDP) in 2013 to more than 4.9% in 2022, making it the second-highest in the world, behind only Israel, which spent 5.9%. In 2023, the government announced a spending cut by about 11% for 2024 and the intention to shift resources to new initiatives, such as efforts to build rockets, pursue biomedical research, and develop US-style biotech innovation.

==== Cyber security ====
Following cyberattacks in the first half of 2013, in which government, news media, television stations, and banks' websites were compromised, the national government committed to training 5,000 new cybersecurity experts by 2017. The South Korean government blamed North Korea for these attacks, as well as incidents that occurred in 2009, 2011, and 2012, but Pyongyang denies the accusations. South Korea's government maintains a broad-ranging approach toward the regulation of specific online content and imposes a substantial level of censorship on election-related discourse and on many websites that the government deems subversive or socially harmful.

==== Aerospace engineering ====
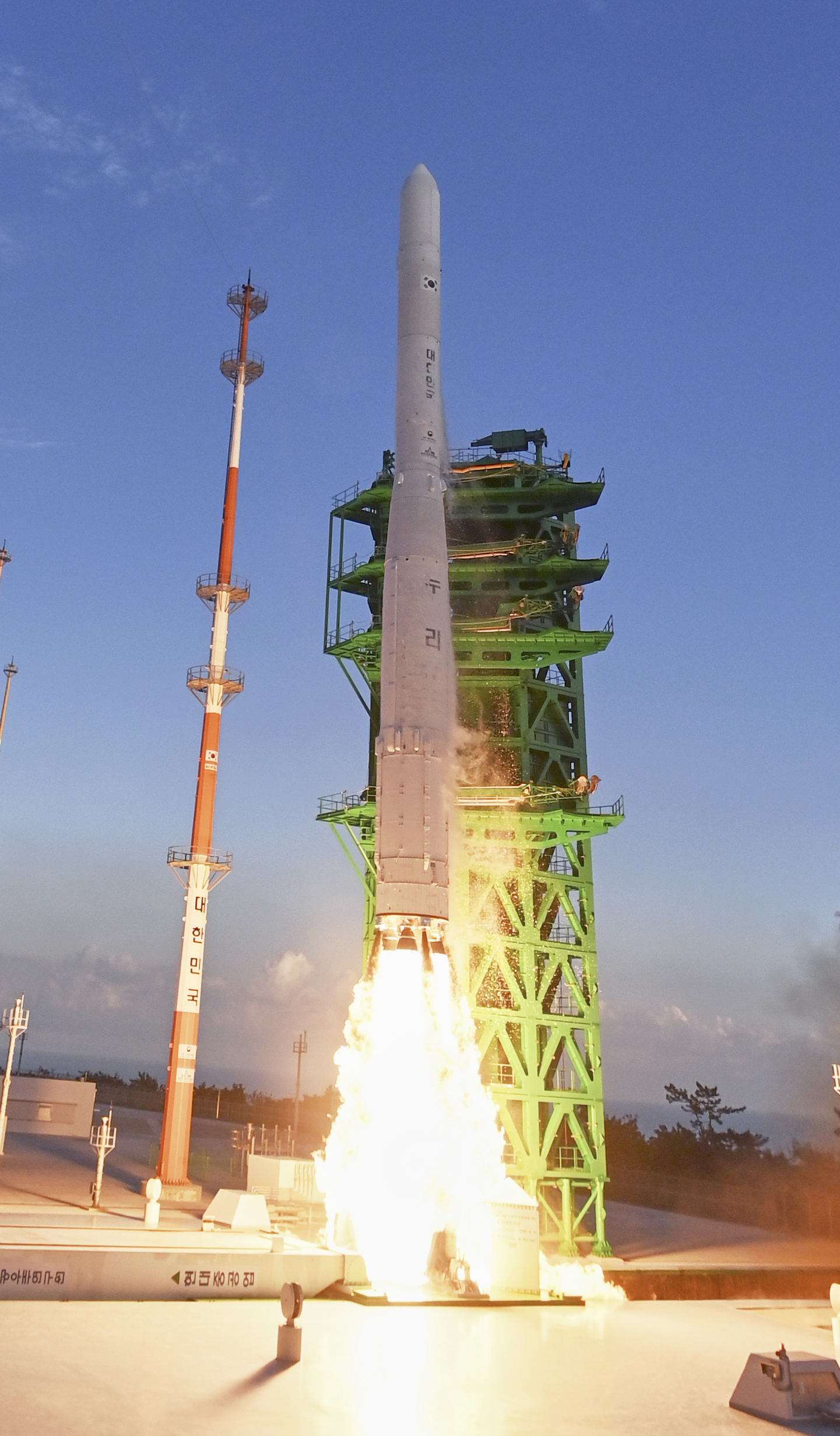
KSLV-II Nuri during liftoff

South Korea has sent up 10 satellites since 1992, all using foreign rockets and overseas launch pads, notably Arirang-1 in 1999, and Arirang-2 in 2006, as part of its space partnership with Russia. Arirang-1 was lost in space in 2008, after nine years in service. In April 2008, Yi So-yeon became the first Korean to fly in space, aboard the Russian Soyuz TMA-12.

In June 2009, the first spaceport of South Korea, Naro Space Center, was completed at Goheung, South Jeolla Province. The launch of Naro-1 in January 2013 was a success, after two previous failed attempts.

Efforts to build an indigenous space launch vehicle have been marred by persistent political pressure from the United States, who had for many decades hindered South Korea's indigenous rocket and missile development programs in fear of their possible connection to clandestine military ballistic missile programs, which Korea many times insisted did not violate the research and development guidelines stipulated by US-Korea agreements on restriction of rocket technology research and development. South Korea has sought the assistance of foreign countries such as Russia through MTCR commitments to supplement its restricted domestic rocket technology. The two failed KSLV-I launch vehicles were based on the Universal Rocket Module, the first stage of the Russian Angara rocket, combined with a solid-fueled second stage built by South Korea.

On October 21, 2021, the KSLV-2 Nuri was successfully launched, making South Korea a country with an indigenous orbital launch capability.

==== Robotics ====
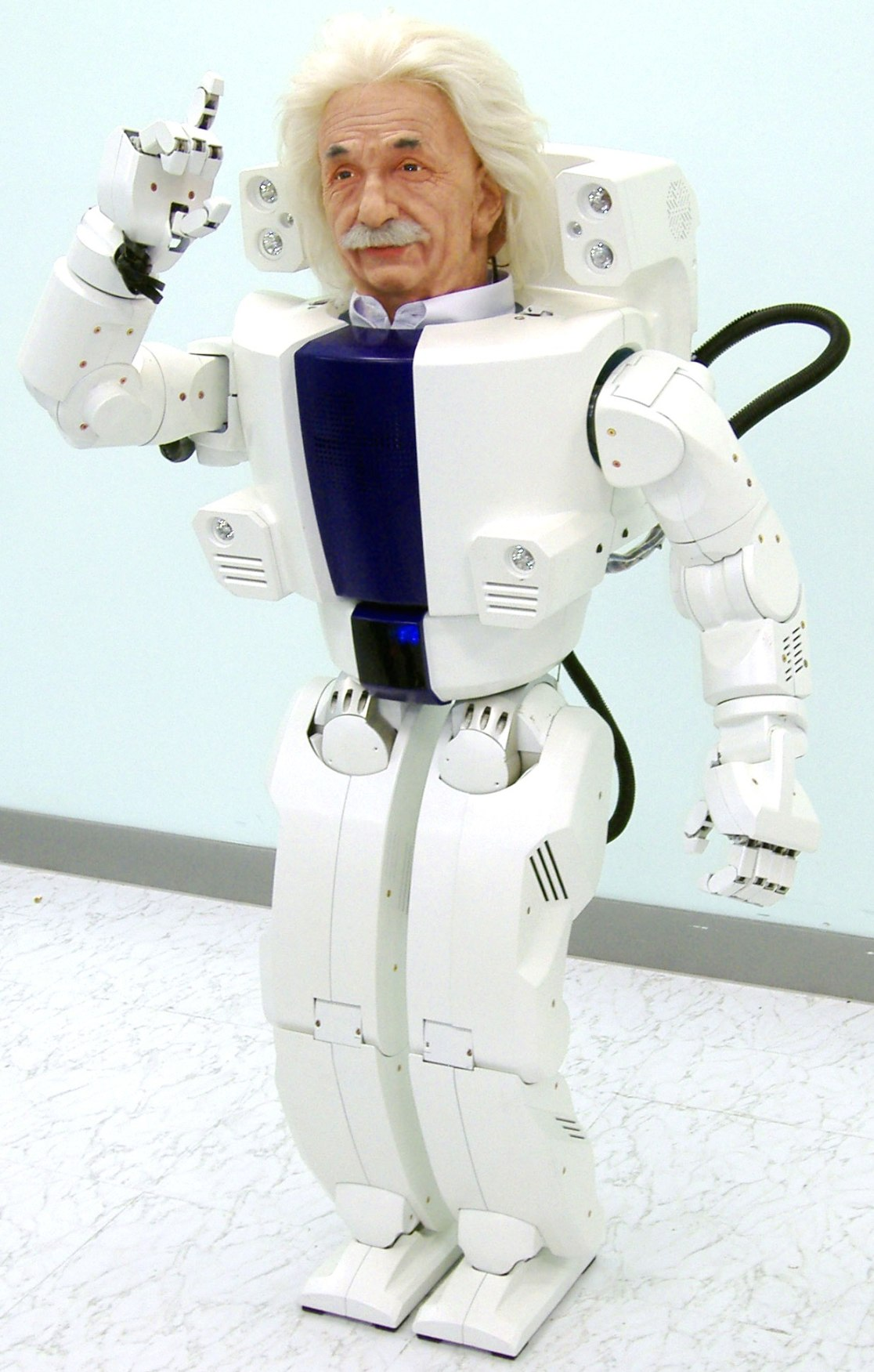
Albert HUBO, developed by KAIST, can make expressive gestures with its five separate fingers.

Robotics has been included in the list of main national research and development projects since 2003. In 2009, the government announced plans to build robot-themed parks in Incheon and Masan with a mix of public and private funding. In 2005, Korea Advanced Institute of Science and Technology (KAIST) developed the world's second walking humanoid robot, HUBO. A team in the Korea Institute of Industrial Technology developed the first Korean android, EveR-1 in May 2006. EveR-1 has been succeeded by more complex models with improved movement and vision.

Plans of creating English-teaching robot assistants to compensate for the shortage of teachers were announced in February 2010, with the robots being deployed to most preschools and kindergartens by 2013. Robotics are also incorporated in the entertainment sector; the Korean Robot Game Festival has been held every year since 2004 to promote science and robot technology.

==== Biotechnology ====
Since the 1980s, the government has invested in the development of a domestic biotechnology industry. The medical sector accounts for a large part of the production, including production of hepatitis vaccines and antibiotics. Research and development in genetics and cloning have received increasing attention, with the first successful cloning of a dog, Snuppy in 2005, and the cloning of two females of an endangered species of gray wolves by the Seoul National University in 2007. The rapid growth of the industry has resulted in significant voids in regulation of ethics, as was highlighted by the scientific misconduct case involving Hwang Woo-Suk.

Since late 2020, SK Bioscience Inc. (a division of SK Group) has been producing a major proportion of the Vaxzevria vaccine (also known as COVID-19 Vaccine AstraZeneca), under license from the University of Oxford and AstraZeneca, for worldwide distribution through the COVAX facility under the WHO hospice. A recent agreement with Novavax expands its production for a second vaccine to 40 million doses in 2022, with a $450 million investment in domestic and overseas facilities.

== Demographics ==
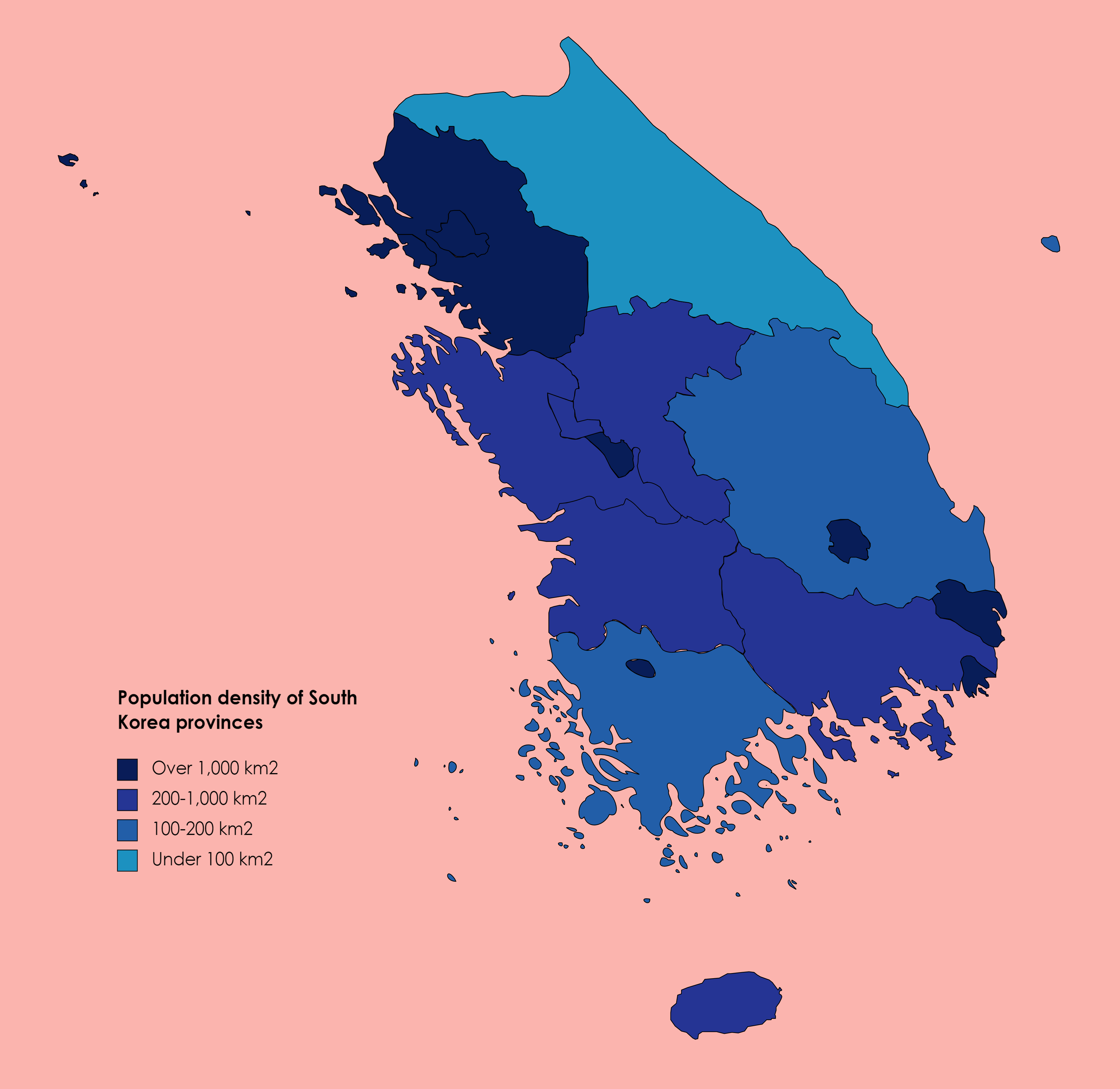
Population density of South Korea provinces

South Korea had an estimated population of roughly 51.7 million in 2022. The population more than doubled from 21.5 million in 1955 to 50 million by 2010. However, it was expected to peak at 52 million in 2024 and decline to 36 million by 2072, owing to a rapid decline in birth rates that began in 1960. South Korea's birth rate became the world's lowest in 2009, at an annual rate of approximately 9 births per 1000 people. Fertility saw some modest increase afterwards, but dropped to a new global low in 2017, with fewer than 30,000 births per month for the first time since records began, and less than one child per woman in 2018. In 2020, the country recorded more deaths than births, resulting in the first population decrease since modern records began.

By 2021, the fertility rate stood at just 0.81 children per woman, well below the replacement rate of 2.1, falling to 0.78 in 2022 and 0.72 in 2023 yet rising to 0.80 in 2025—still the lowest in the world. Consequently, South Korea has seen the steepest decline in working age population among OECD nations; the proportion of people aged 65 years and over is slated to reach over 20% by 2025 and close to 45% by 2050. The low birth rate has been declared a "national emergency" and prompted the creation of a new ministry in May 2024 dedicated to reversing the trend and addressing issues related to aging, immigration, and the workforce. The government has also launched various incentives to help entice families to have children, including a cash allowance for newborns and greater funding of childcare and fertility treatments.

Government policy, along with a rebound in marriages delayed by COVID-19, may account for the Korean birth rate increasing in late 2024; total births in the third quarter were up 8% from the same period last year, marking the largest quarterly increase since the third quarter of 2012 and the first annual rise in total fertility since 2015. Data released in January 2025 show the number of births in November 2024 was 20,095, a 14.6% increase year-on-year, the highest growth rate since November 2010 (which recorded a 17.5% increase), and the third consecutive month of double-digit growth, following September's 10.1% and October's 13.4%.

Most South Koreans live in urban areas, following rapid migration from the countryside during the country's rapid economic expansion in the 1970s through the 1990s. About half the population (24.5 million) is concentrated in the Seoul Metropolitan Area, making it the world's second largest metropolitan area; other major cities include Busan (3.5 million), Incheon (3.0 million), Daegu (2.5 million), Daejeon (1.4 million), Gwangju (1.4 million) and Ulsan (1.1 million). Population density is estimated at 514.6 per square kilometre (1,333/sq mi) in 2022, more than 10 times the global average.

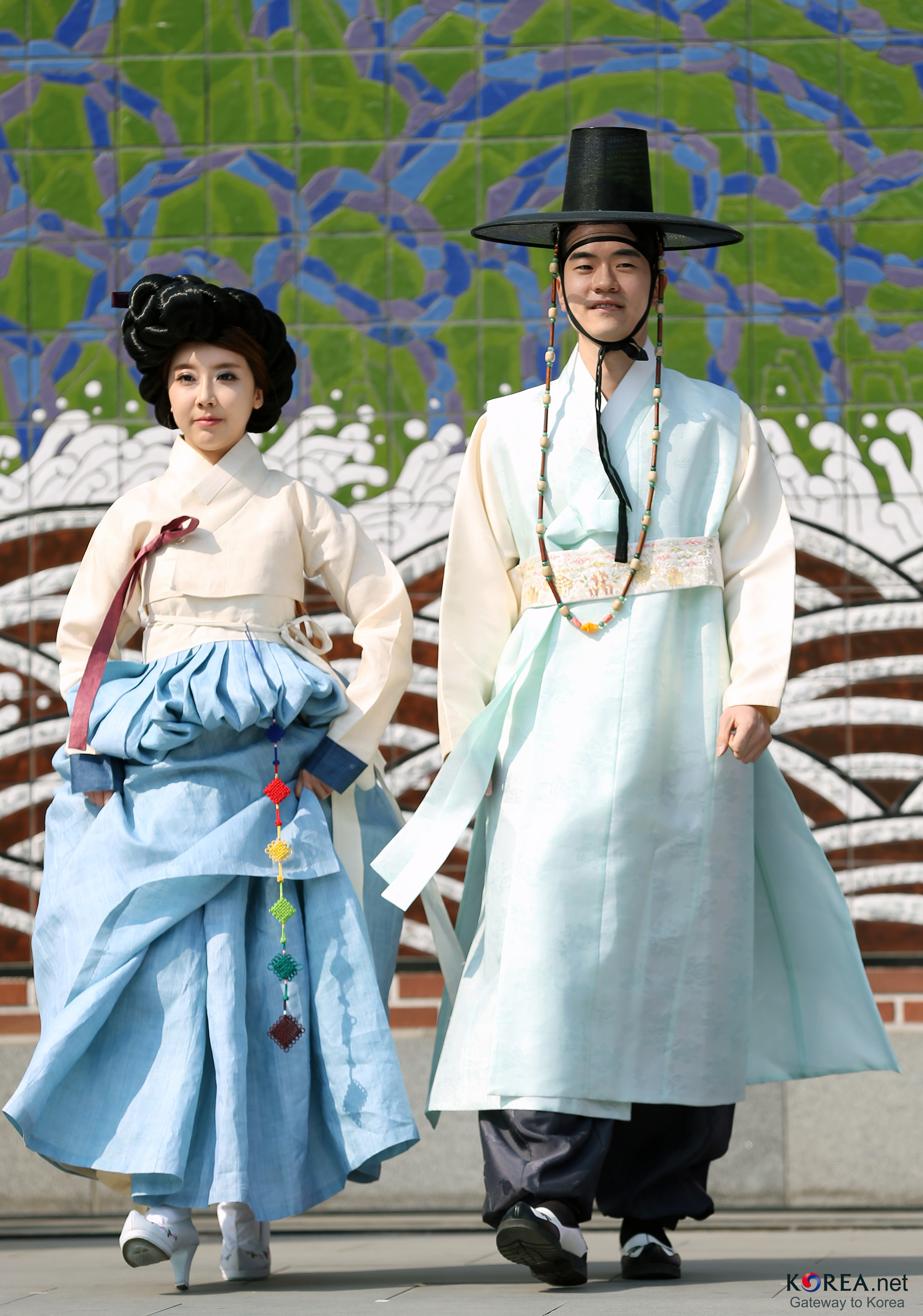
South Koreans in traditional dress

The population has been shaped by international migration. After World War II and the division of the Korean Peninsula, about four million people from North Korea crossed the border to South Korea. This trend of net entry reversed over the next 40 years because of emigration; large numbers of ethnic Koreans live overseas, sometimes in ethnic neighborhoods known as Koreatowns. The four largest diaspora populations are in China (2.3 million), the United States (1.8 million), Japan (850,000), and Canada (250,000).

South Korea is among the most ethnically homogeneous societies in the world, with ethnic Koreans representing approximately 96% of the total population. Precise numbers are difficult to estimate since official statistics do not record ethnicity, and many immigrants are ethnically Korean, while a growing number of South Korean citizens are not. The percentage of foreign nationals has been growing rapidly since the late 1990s, with South Korea having one of the fastest-growing foreign-born populations: As of November 2023, there was an all-time high of 2.46 million foreign residents, accounting for nearly 5 percent of the total population, compared to 2016 figures of 1.4 million foreign residents (roughly 2.75 percent of the population). Much of this growth was driven by foreign workers and international students.

About 30,000 foreign-born residents obtain South Korean citizenship every year since 2010; in 2023, the number of foreigners who had acquired Korean nationality was 234,506, an increase of 4.8 percent from the prior year. The number of children of foreign residents born in South Korea increased by 7,809, or 2.8 percent, to 289,886. Many foreign citizens are ethnic Koreans: migrants from China (PRC) are the largest foreign-born group both proportionally and numerically, accounting for 56.5% of foreign nationals, but approximately 70% of these Chinese citizens are Joseonjok (조선족), PRC citizens of Korean ethnicity. In addition, about 43,000 English teachers from English-speaking countries reside temporarily in Korea.

Corresponding to its socioeconomic development, South Korea has experienced a dramatic increase in life expectancy, from 79.10 years in 2008 (which was 34th in the world), to 83.53 years in 2024—the fifth-highest of any country or territory.

Largest cities or towns in South Korea 2015 Population and Housing Census
Rank	Name	Province	Pop.	Rank	Name	Province	Pop.
1	Seoul	Seoul	9,904,312	11	Yongin	Gyeonggi	971,327
2	Busan	Busan	3,448,737	12	Seongnam	Gyeonggi	948,757
3	Incheon	Incheon	2,890,451	13	Bucheon	Gyeonggi	843,794
4	Daegu	Daegu	2,446,052	14	Cheongju	North Chungcheong	833,276
5	Daejeon	Daejeon	1,538,394	15	Ansan	Gyeonggi	747,035
6	Gwangju	Gwangju	1,502,881	16	Jeonju	North Jeolla	658,172
7	Suwon	Gyeonggi	1,194,313	17	Cheonan	South Chungcheong	629,062
8	Ulsan	Ulsan	1,166,615	18	Namyangju	Gyeonggi	629,061
9	Changwon	South Gyeongsang	1,059,241	19	Hwaseong	Gyeonggi	608,725
10	Goyang	Gyeonggi	990,073	20	Anyang	Gyeonggi	585,177

=== Language ===
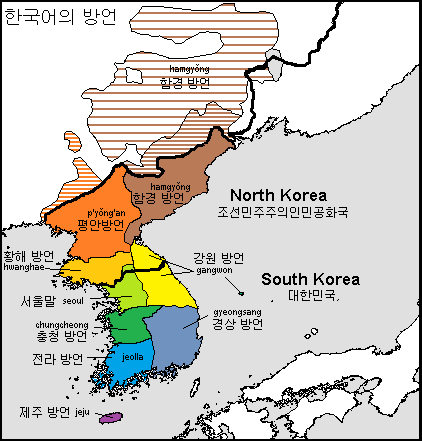
Dialects of the Korean language

Korean is the official language of South Korea and is classified by most linguists as a language isolate. It incorporates a significant number of loanwords from Chinese. Korean uses an indigenous writing system called Hangul, created in 1446 by Sejong the Great to provide a convenient alternative to the Classical Chinese Hanja characters, which did not fit the Korean language well. South Korea still uses some Chinese Hanja characters in niche areas, such as print media and legal documentation.

The Korean language in South Korea has a standard dialect known as the Seoul dialect, with an additional four dialects (Chungcheong, Gangwon, Gyeongsang, and Jeolla) and one language (Jeju) in use around the country. Almost all South Korean students today learn English throughout their education.

=== Religion ===
Religion in South Korea (2024)
1. No religion (51.0%)
2. Protestantism (20.0%)
3. Catholicism (11.0%)
4. Buddhism (17.0%)
5. Other religions (2.00%)

According to the 2024 results of the Korea Research's regular survey "Public Opinion Within Public Opinion", more than half of the South Korean population (51%) declared themselves not affiliated with any religious organizations. Of the people who are affiliated with a religious organization, most are Christians and Buddhists. According to the survey, 31% of the population were Christians (20% identified themselves as Protestants, 11% as Roman Catholics) and 17% were Buddhists. Other religions include Islam (approximately 130,000 Muslims, which includes 73% of migrant workers from Pakistan and Bangladesh and 27% being Korean Muslims), the homegrown sect of Won Buddhism, and a variety of indigenous religions, including Cheondoism (a Confucianizing religion), Jeungsanism, Daejongism, Daesun Jinrihoe, and others. Freedom of religion is guaranteed by the constitution, and there is no state religion. Overall, between 2015 and 2024, there has been a slight rise in Christianity (from 27.6% to 31%), a slow rise in Buddhism (from 15.5% to 17%), and a decline in the unaffiliated population (from 56.9% to 51%).

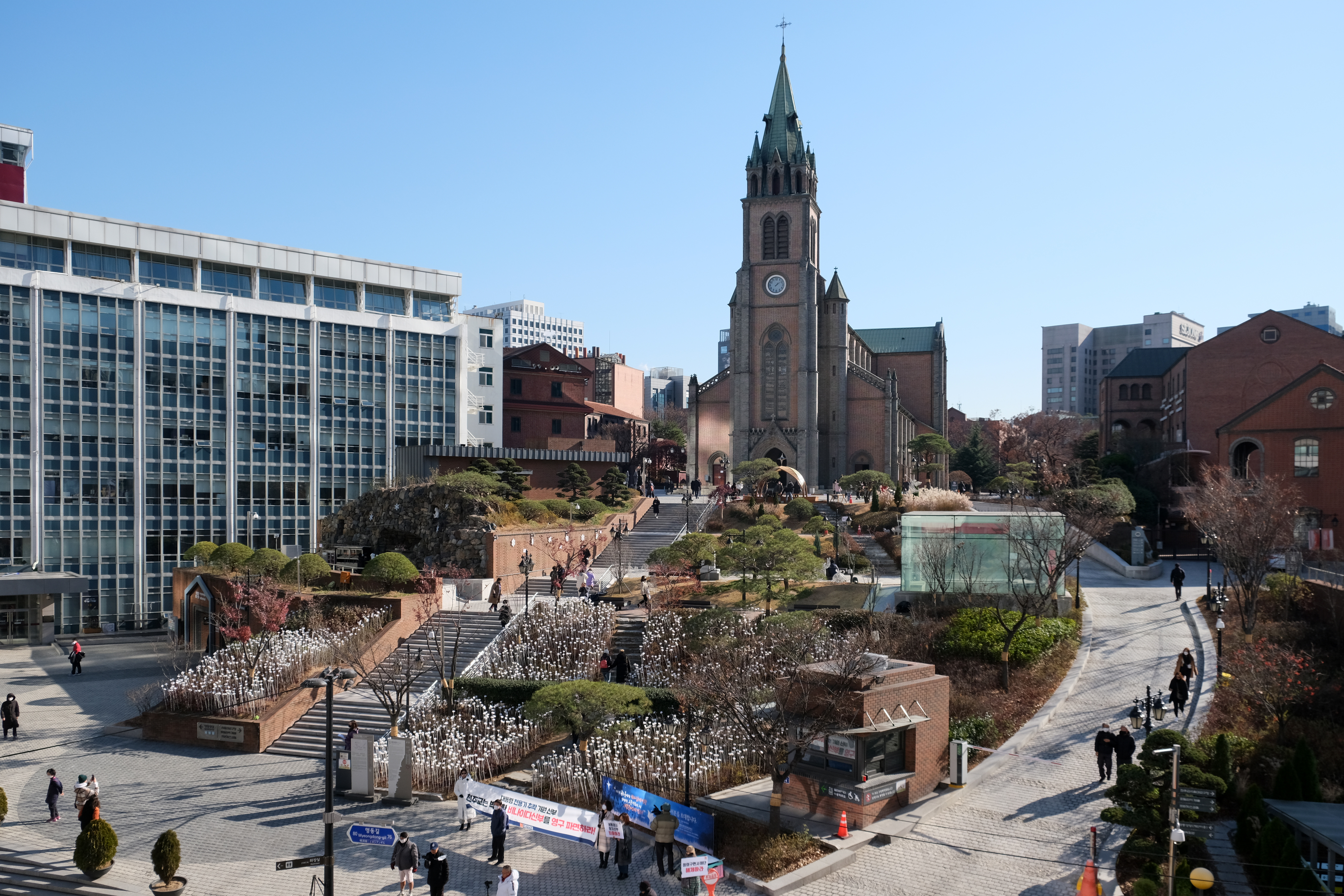
The Myeongdong Cathedral, seat of the Archdiocese of Seoul.

Christianity is South Korea's largest organized religion, accounting for more than half of all South Korean adherents of religious organizations. There are approximately 16 million Christians in South Korea today; about two-thirds of them belong to Protestant churches, and the rest to the Catholic Church. The number of Protestants had been stagnant throughout the 1990s and the 2000s but increased to a peak level throughout the 2010s. Roman Catholics increased significantly between the 1980s and the 2000s but declined throughout the 2010s. Christianity, unlike in other East Asian countries, found fertile ground in Korea in the 18th century, and by the end of the 18th century, it persuaded a large part of the population, as the declining monarchy supported it and opened the country to widespread proselytism as part of a project of Westernization. The weakness of Korean shamanism, which—unlike Japanese Shinto and China's religious system—never developed into a national religion of high status, combined with the impoverished state of Korean Buddhism, (after 500 years of suppression at the hands of the Joseon state, by the 20th century it was virtually extinct), left a free hand to Christian churches. Christianity's similarity to native religious narratives has been studied as another factor that contributed to its success in the peninsula. The Japanese colonization of the first half of the 20th century further strengthened the identification of Christianity with Korean nationalism, as the Japanese coopted native Korean shamanism into the Nipponic Imperial Shinto that they tried to establish in the peninsula. Widespread Christianization of the Koreans took place during State Shinto, after its abolition, and then in the independent South Korea as the newly established military government supported Christianity and tried to oust native shamanism.

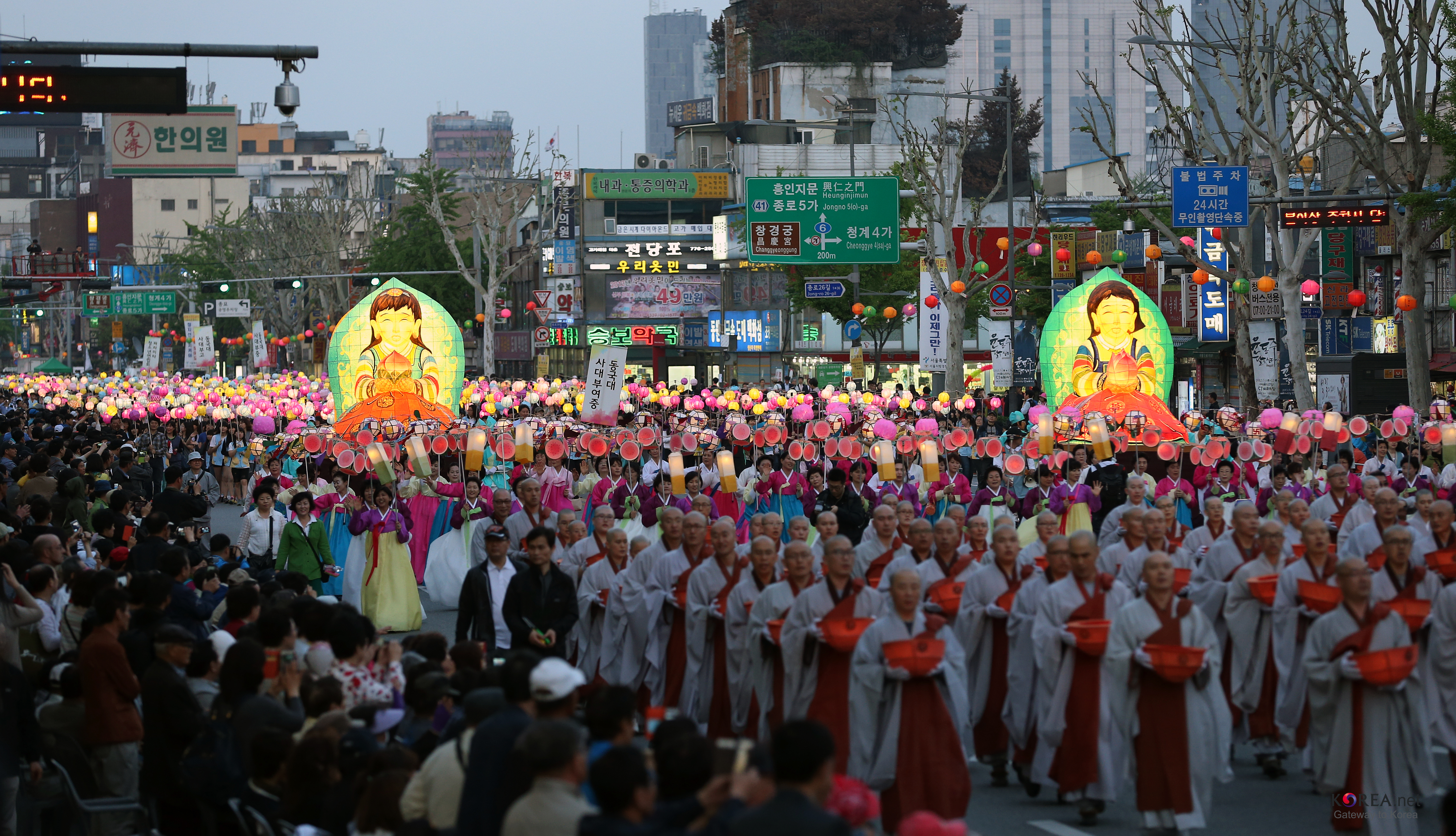
Buddha's Birthday celebration in Seoul

Among Christian denominations, Presbyterianism is the largest. About nine million people belong to one of the hundred different Presbyterian churches; the biggest ones are the HapDong Presbyterian Church, TongHap Presbyterian Church, and the Koshin Presbyterian Church. South Korea is also the second-largest missionary-sending nation, after the United States.

Buddhism was introduced to Korea in the 4th century. It soon became a dominant religion in the southeastern kingdom of Silla, the region that hitherto hosts the strongest concentration of Buddhists in South Korea. In the other states of the Three Kingdoms Period, Goguryeo and Baekje, it became the state religion in 372 and 528, respectively. It remained the state religion in Later Silla and Goryeo. It was later suppressed throughout much of the subsequent history under the unified kingdom of Joseon, which officially adopted a strict Korean Confucianism. Today, South Korea has about 8.7 million Buddhists, most of them affiliated to the Jogye Order. Most of the National Treasures of South Korea are Buddhist artifacts.

=== Education ===
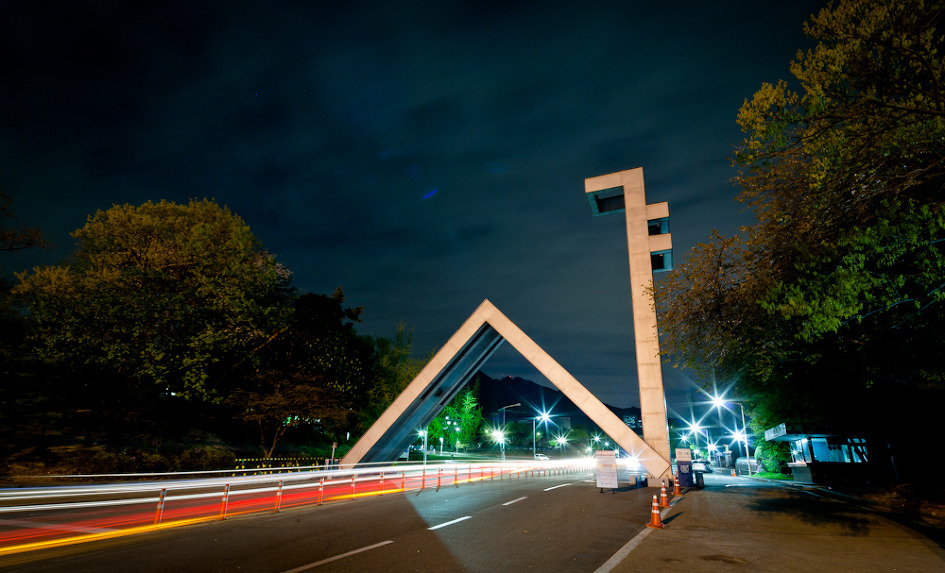
Seoul National University is considered to be the most prestigious university in South Korea.

A centralized administration in South Korea oversees the process for the education of children from kindergarten to the third and final year of high school. The school year is divided into two semesters: the first begins in March and ends in mid-July, and the second begins in late August and ends in mid-February. The country adopted a new educational program to increase the number of international students by 2010. According to the Ministry of Education, Science and Technology, the number of scholarships for international students in South Korea would have (under the program) doubled by that time, and the number of international students would have reached 100,000.

South Korea is one of the top-performing Organisation for Economic Co-operation and Development (OECD) countries in reading literacy, mathematics, and sciences, with the average student scoring 519, compared with the OECD average of 492, placing it ninth in the world. The country has one of the world's highest-educated labor forces among OECD countries. The country is well known for its highly feverish outlook on education, where its national obsession with education has been called "education fever". This obsession with education has catapulted the resource-poor nation consistently atop the global education rankings. In 2014, South Korea ranked second worldwide (after Singapore) in the national rankings of students' math and science scores by the OECD. Higher education is a serious issue in South Korean society, where it is viewed as one of the fundamental cornerstones of South Korean life. Education is regarded with a high priority for South Korean families, as success in education is often a source of honor and pride for families and within South Korean society at large, and is seen as a fundamental necessity to channel one's social mobility to ultimately improve one's socioeconomic position in South Korean society. Due to the importance of education in Korean society, many students attend cram schools.

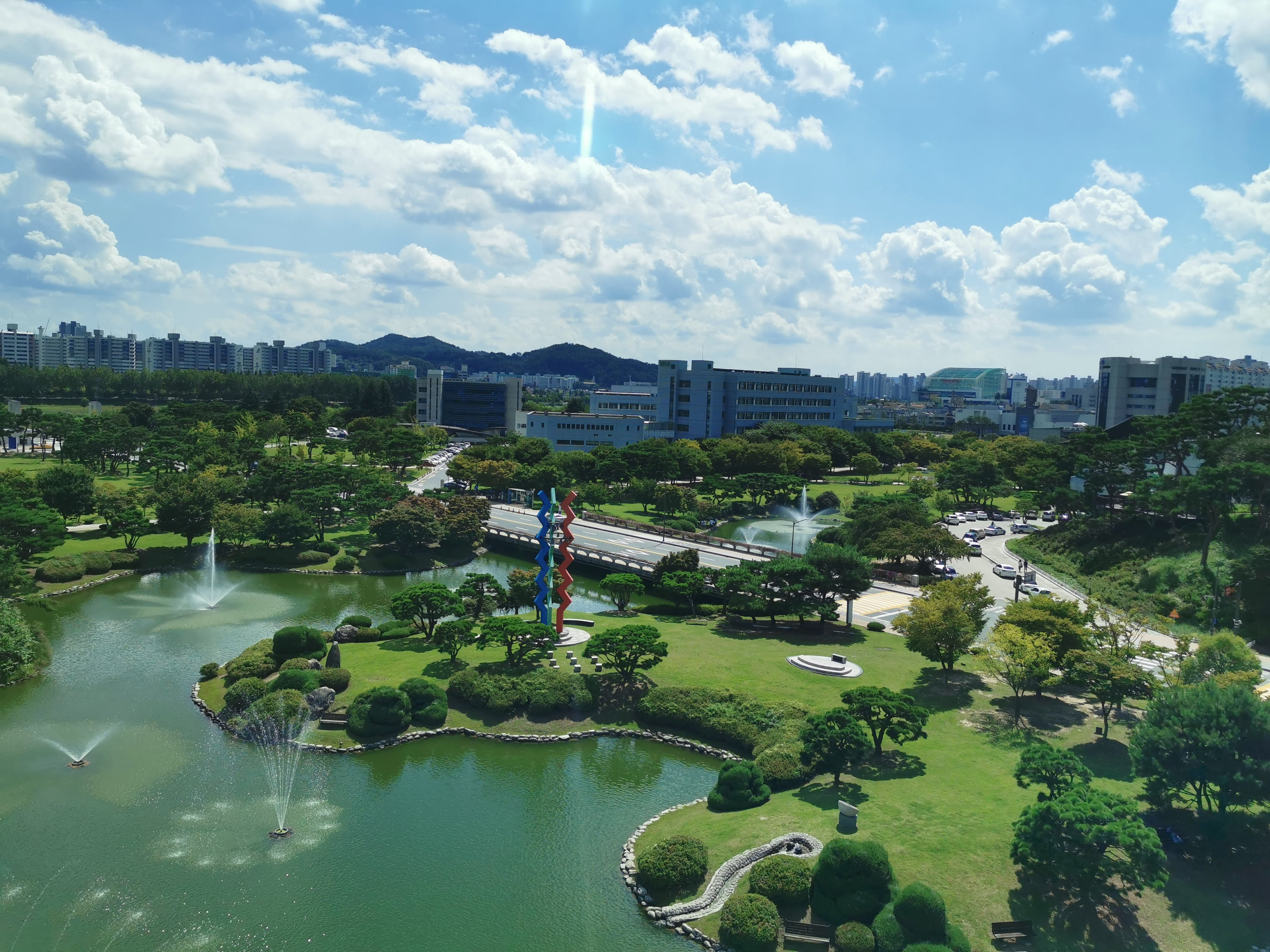
KAIST main campus in Daejeon

In 2015, the country spent 5.1% of its GDP on education at all levels—roughly 0.8 percentage points above the OECD average of 4.3%. A strong investment in education, a militant drive to achieve academic success, as well as the passion for scholarly excellence has helped the country rapidly grow its economy over the past 60 years into a developed country.

As of 2025, the school violence victimization rate reached 2.5%, the highest level since the government began tracking the data in 2013. Data shows that in South Korea, bullies often outnumber victims by three or four to one because an entire class may participate in ostracizing a single student. Elementary school students now report the highest victimization rates, at approximately 5.0%.

=== Health ===
Development of life expectancy in North Korea and South Korea

South Korea has a universal health care system. According to Health Care Index rankings, it has the world's second-best healthcare system. South Korean hospitals have advanced medical equipment and facilities readily available, ranking 4th for MRI units per capita and 6th for CT scanners per capita in the OECD. It also had the OECD's second largest number of hospital beds per 1000 people at 9.56 beds. Life expectancy has been rising rapidly and South Korea ranked 6th in the world for life expectancy at 83.5 years in 2023. It also has the third-highest health-adjusted life expectancy in the world. South Korea maintains the world's highest per capita rate of plastic surgery. Suicide in South Korea is the 12th highest in the world according to the World Health Organization, as well as the highest suicide rate in the OECD, a position it has held for most of the 21st century.

== Culture ==
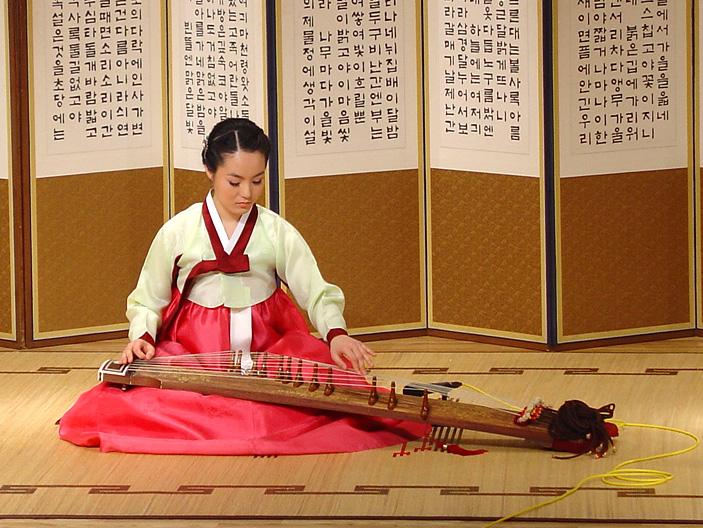
A musician playing a gayageum

South Korea shares its traditional culture with North Korea, but the two Koreas have developed distinct contemporary forms of culture since the peninsula was divided in 1945. Historically, while the culture has been heavily influenced by that of neighboring China, it has nevertheless independently managed to develop a unique cultural identity in its own right that is distinct from its larger neighbors. As of 2024, South Korea has 24 UNESCO Intangible Cultural Heritages of Humanity, along with 16 World Heritage Sites. The Ministry of Culture, Sports and Tourism actively encourages the traditional arts, as well as modern forms, through funding and education programs. According to the 2023 edition of the Press Freedom Index, South Korea has the second highest level of press freedom in Continental and East Asia, behind Taiwan.

Industrialization and urbanization have brought many changes to the way modern Koreans live. Changing economic circumstances and lifestyles have led to a concentration of population in major cities, especially the capital Seoul, with multi-generational households separating into nuclear family living arrangements. A 2014 Euromonitor International study on 44 countries found that South Koreans drink the most alcohol on a weekly basis compared to the rest of the world. South Koreans drink 13.7 shots of liquor per week on average, with Russia, the Philippines, and Thailand following.

=== Art ===
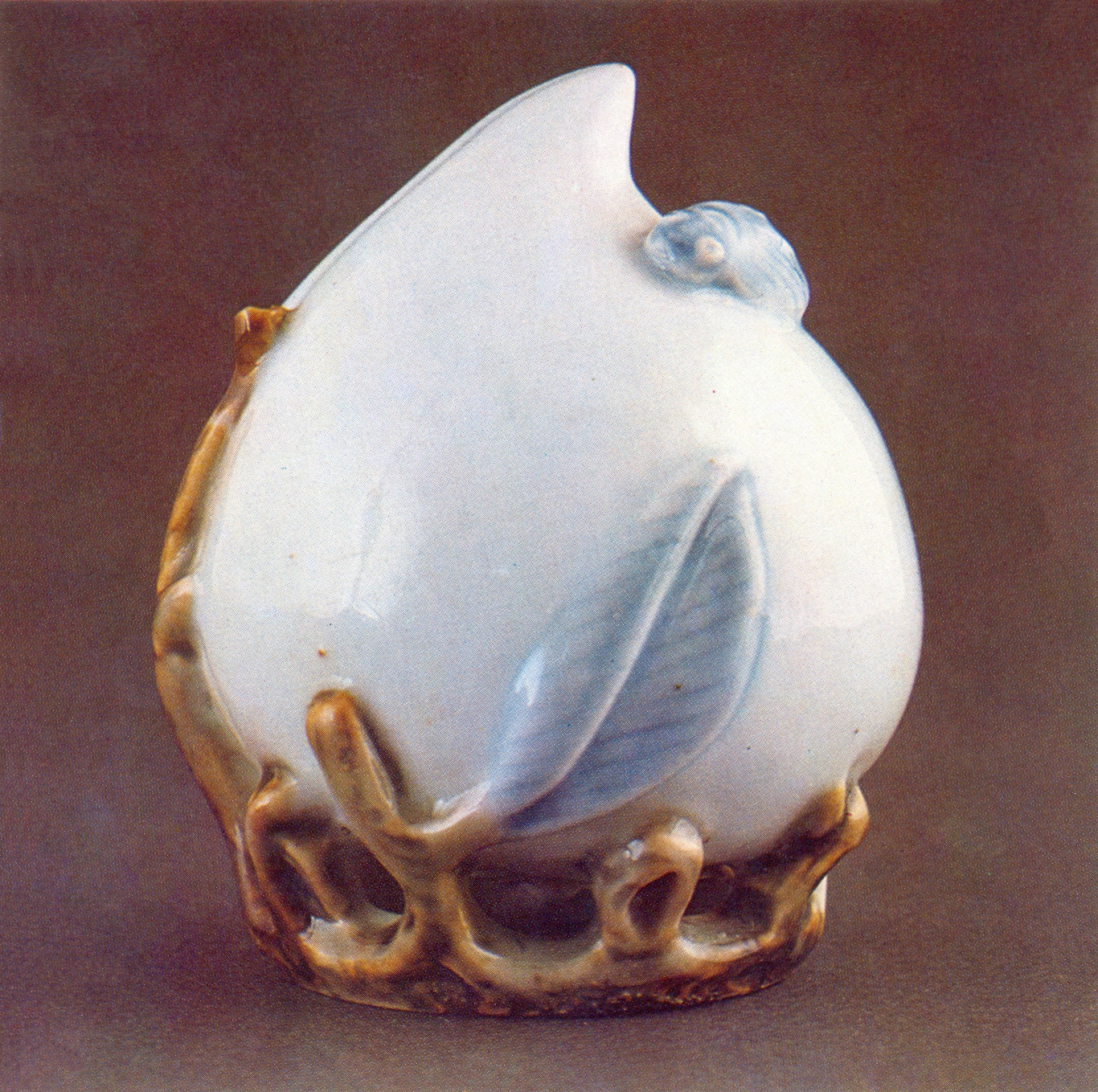
A blue and white porcelain peach-shaped water dropper from the Joseon dynasty in the 18th century

Korean art has been highly influenced by Buddhism and Confucianism, which can be seen in the many traditional paintings, sculptures, ceramics and the performing arts. Korean pottery and porcelain, such as Joseon's baekja and buncheong, and Goryeo's celadon are well known throughout the world. The Korean tea ceremony, pansori, talchum, and buchaechum are also notable Korean performing arts.

Post-war modern Korean art started to flourish in the 1960s and 1970s, when South Korean artists took an interest in geometrical shapes and intangible subjects. Establishing harmony between man and nature was also a favorite of this time. Due to social instability, social issues became the main subjects in the 1980s. Art was influenced by various international events and exhibits in Korea, which brought more diversity. The Olympic Sculpture Garden in 1988, the transposition of the 1993 edition of the Whitney Biennial to Seoul, the creation of the Gwangju Biennale and the Korean Pavilion at the Venice Biennale in 1995 were notable events.

=== Architecture ===
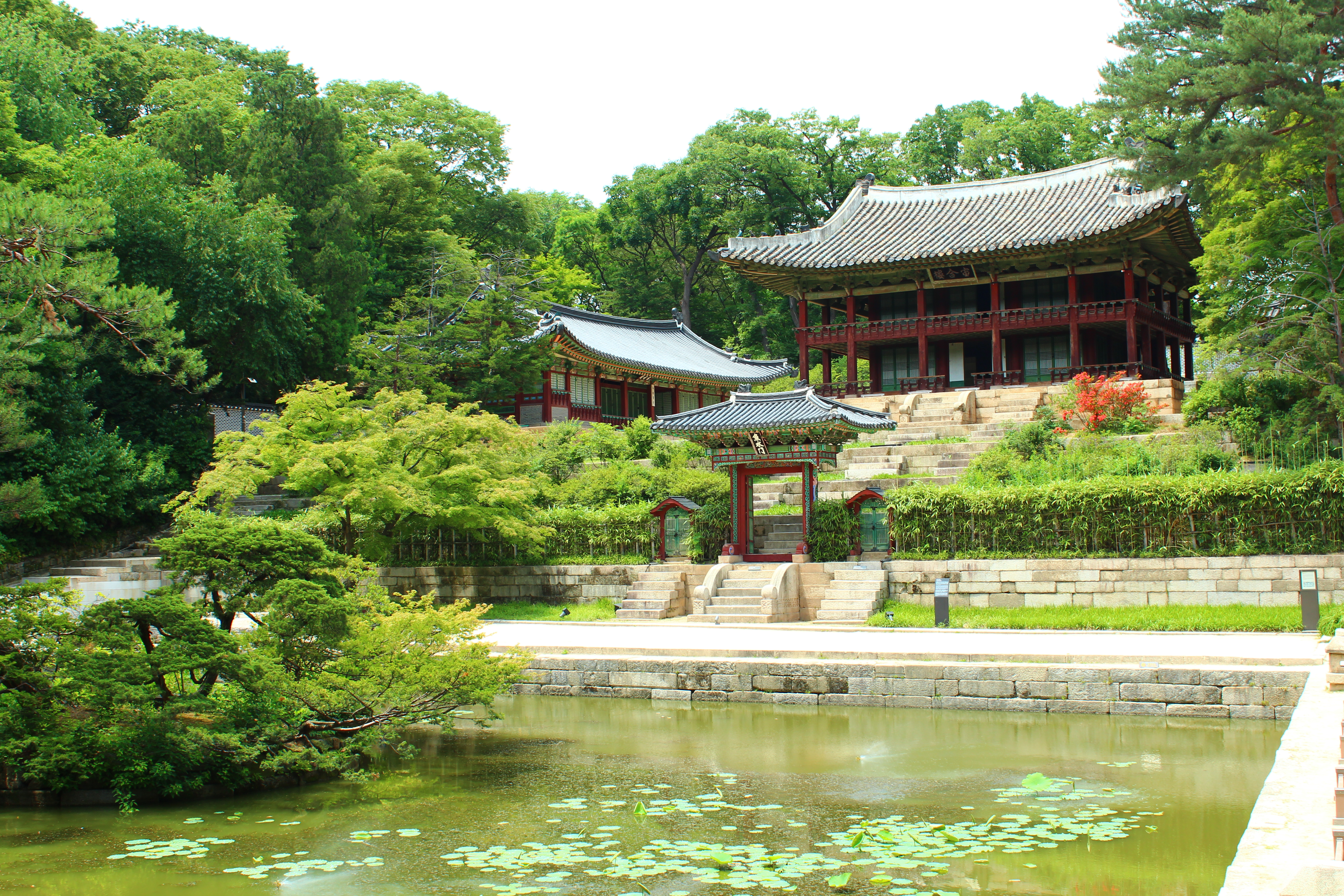
Buyongjeong area in Changdeokgung

Because of South Korea's tumultuous history, construction and destruction have been repeated endlessly, resulting in an interesting melange of architectural styles and designs.

Traditional Korean architecture is characterized by its harmony with nature. Ancient architects adopted the bracket system characterized by thatched roofs and heated floors called ondol. People of the upper classes built bigger houses with elegantly curved tiled roofs and lifting eaves. Traditional architecture can be seen in the palaces and temples, preserved old houses called hanok, and special sites like Hahoe Folk Village, Yangdong Folk Village and Korean Folk Village. Traditional architecture may also be seen at several of the UNESCO World Heritage Sites.

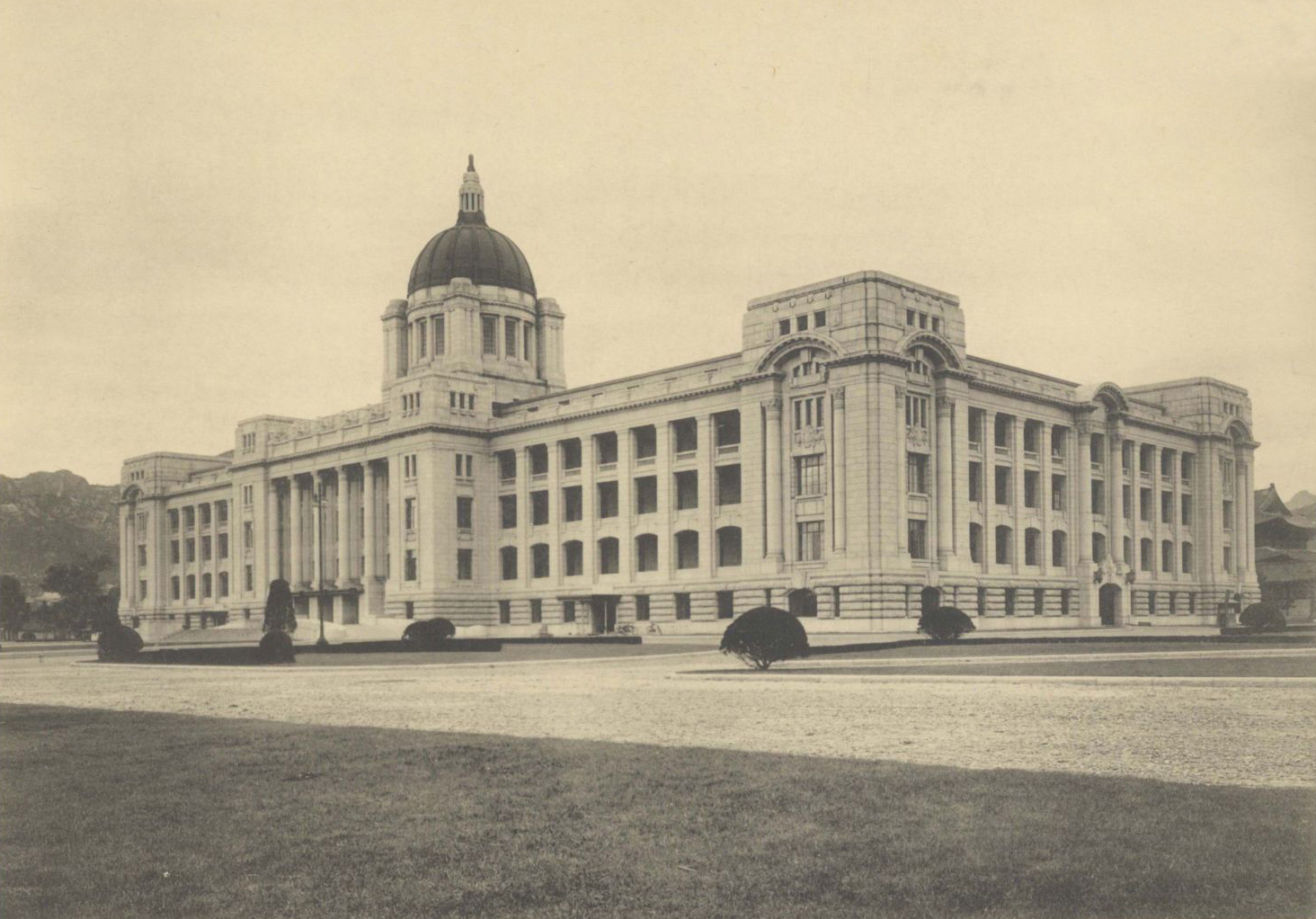
Government-General of Chōsen Building was demolished in 1996 under the Kim Young-sam government.

Western architecture was first introduced at the end of the 19th century. Churches, offices for foreign legislation, schools, and university buildings were built in new styles. With Japan's annexation of Korea in 1910, the colonial regime intervened in Korea's architectural heritage, imposing Japanese-style modern architecture. Anti-Japanese sentiment and the Korean War led to the destruction of most buildings constructed during that time.

Modern Korean architecture entered a new phase of development during the post-Korean War reconstruction, incorporating modern architectural trends and styles. Stimulated by the economic growth in the 1970s and 1980s, active redevelopment saw new horizons in architectural design. In the aftermath of the 1988 Seoul Olympics, South Korea has witnessed a wide variety of styles in its architectural landscape, with the opening of the market to foreign architects. Contemporary architectural efforts have attempted to balance the traditional philosophy of "harmony with nature" and the fast-paced urbanization that the country has been going through in recent years.

=== Entertainment ===
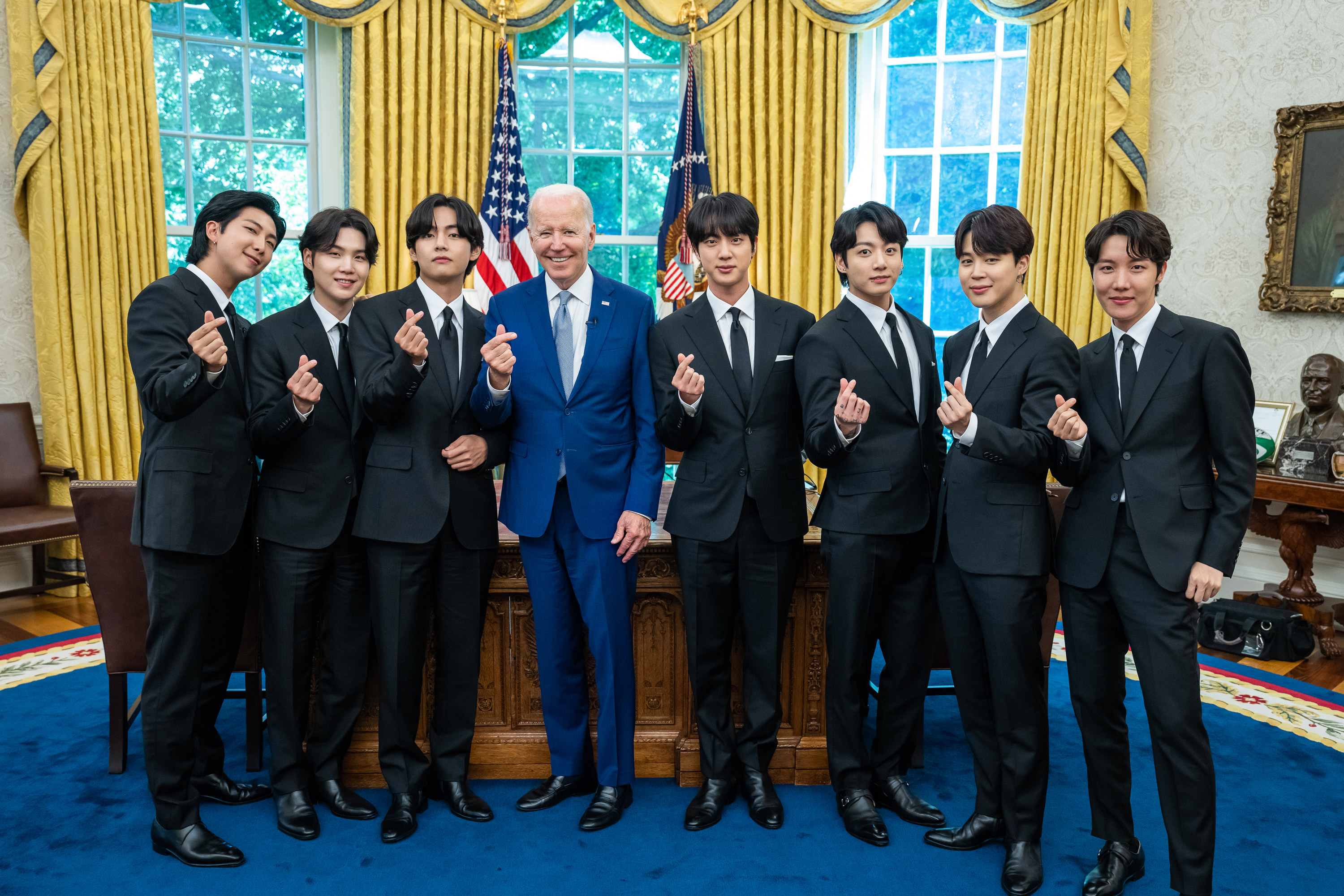
K-pop group BTS has emerged as one of the country's most successful Korean boy bands since their rise to international prominence during the latter half of the 2010s.

In addition to domestic consumption, South Korea has a thriving entertainment industry, in which television dramas, films, and popular music have garnered international popularity and generated significant export revenues for the nation's economy. The cultural phenomenon known as Hallyu, or the "Korean Wave", has swept many countries across Continental and East Asia, making South Korea a major soft power as an exporter of popular culture and entertainment, rivaling Western nations such as the United States and the United Kingdom.

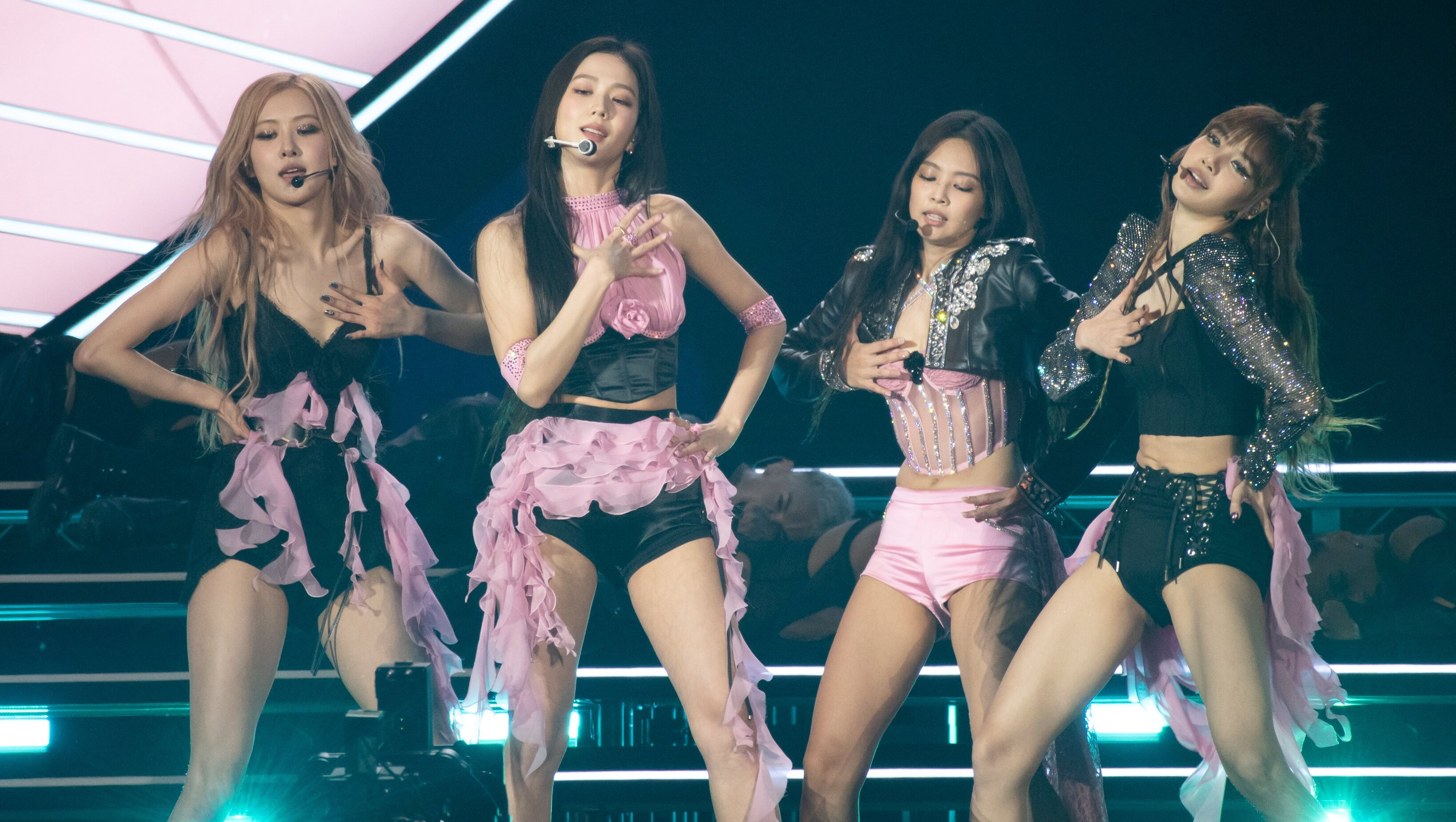
Blackpink has been one of the most popular K-pop girl groups in the world since the late 2010s.

Until the 1990s, trot and traditional folk-based ballads dominated the South Korean popular music scene. The emergence of the pop group Seo Taiji and Boys in 1992 marked a turning point for South Korean popular music, also known as K-pop. Since the 1990s, the genre of K-pop has continuously engaged in a process of ongoing reinvention and modernization by assimilating various elements of popular musical genres and trends from across the world such as Western popular music, experimental, jazz, gospel, Latin, hip-hop, rhythm and blues, electronic dance, reggae, country, folk, and rock on top of its uniquely traditional Korean music roots. Although Western-style pop, hip-hop, rhythm and blues, rock, folk, and electronic dance-oriented acts have become dominant in the contemporary South Korean popular music scene, trot continues to be appreciated and enjoyed by older South Koreans. K-pop idols are well known across Continental Asia, have found fame in the Western World, and have generated millions of dollars in export revenue beyond the confines of the traditional East Asian music market. Many K-pop acts have also established themselves by securing a strong global following using online social media platforms such as YouTube. K-pop first began to make its mark outside of Continental and East Asia following the unexpected success of singer Psy's international music sensation, "Gangnam Style", which topped global music charts in 2012.

Since the success of the film Shiri in 1999, the Korean film industry has grown substantially, garnering recognition both nationwide and across the globe. Domestic films have a dominant share of the South Korean film market, partly because of the existence of government screen quotas requiring cinemas to show Korean films for at least 73 days of the year. 2019's Parasite, directed by Bong Joon-ho, became the highest-grossing film in South Korea as well as the first non-English language film to win Best Picture at the United States-based Academy Awards that year amongst numerous other accolades.

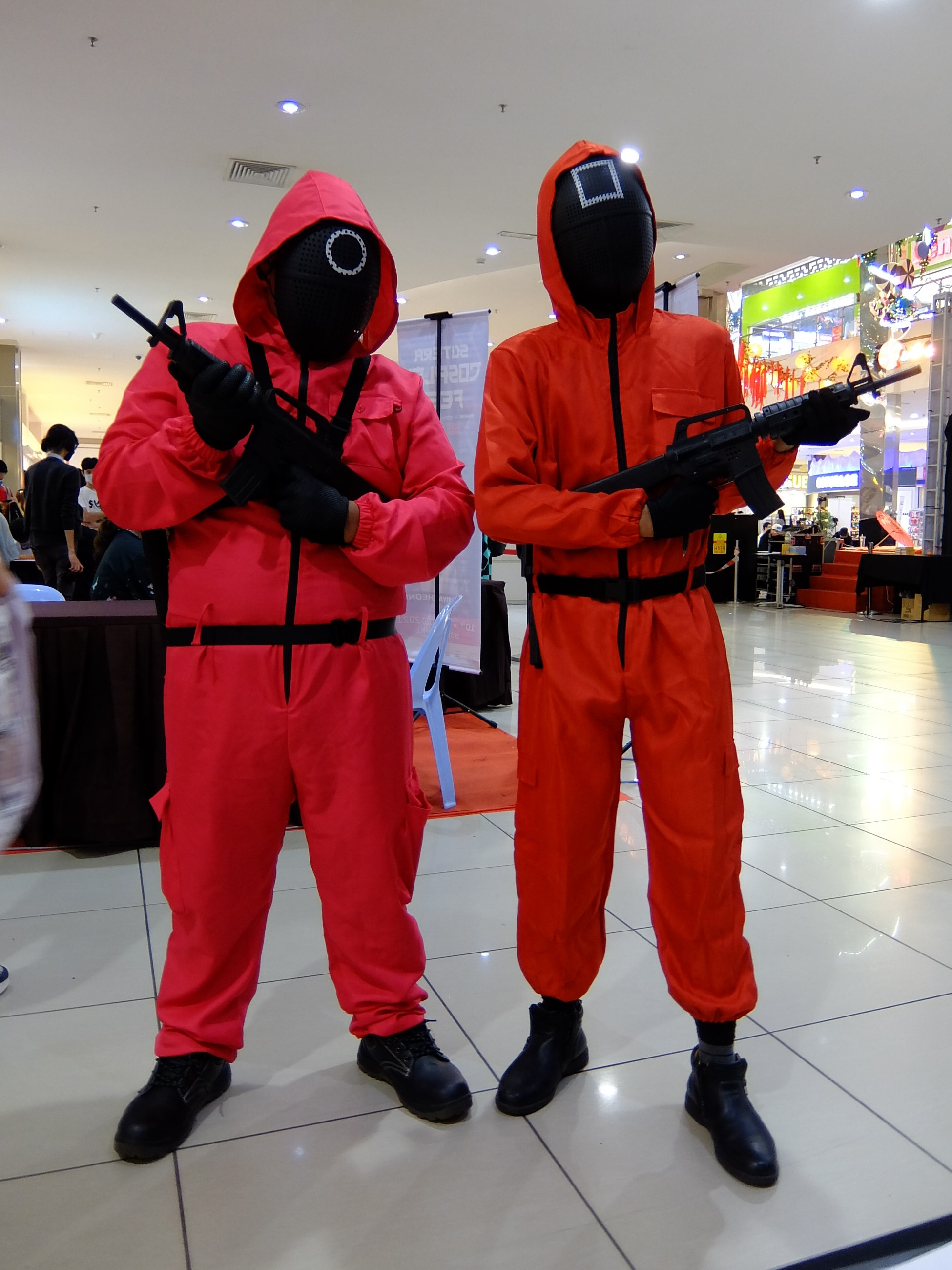
People cosplaying as guards from Squid Game

South Korean television shows have become popular outside of Korea. Television dramas, known as K-dramas, have begun to find fame internationally. Many dramas tend to have a romantic focus. Historical dramas are also famous. The 2021 survival drama Squid Game, created by Hwang Dong-hyuk, received critical acclaim and widespread international attention upon its release, becoming Netflix's most-watched series at launch and garnering a viewership of more than 142 million households during its first four weeks from launch.

Unlike many other countries, South Korea's cultural exports, including K-pop and television dramas, are integrated into a formal state development strategy. The South Korean government allocates substantial annual funding exceeding several billion dollars to foster K-content as a tool for national branding and soft power. This systematic investment aims to project a modernized image of the country and stimulate economic growth through increased tourism and cultural exports.

=== Holidays ===
The Korean New Year, or "Seollal", is celebrated on the first day of the Korean calendar. Korean Independence Day falls on March 1 and commemorates the March First Movement of 1919. Memorial Day is celebrated on June 6, and its purpose is to honor the men and women who died in South Korea's independence movement. Constitution Day is on July 17, and it celebrates the promulgation of Constitution of the Republic of Korea. Liberation Day, on August 15, celebrates Korea's liberation from the Empire of Japan in 1945.

Every 15th day of the 8th lunar month, Koreans celebrate the Midautumn Festival, in which Koreans visit their ancestral hometowns and eat a variety of traditional Korean foods. On October 1, Armed Forces Day is celebrated, honoring the military forces of South Korea. October 3 is National Foundation Day. Hangul Day on October 9 commemorates the invention of hangul, the native alphabet of the Korean language.

=== Cuisine ===
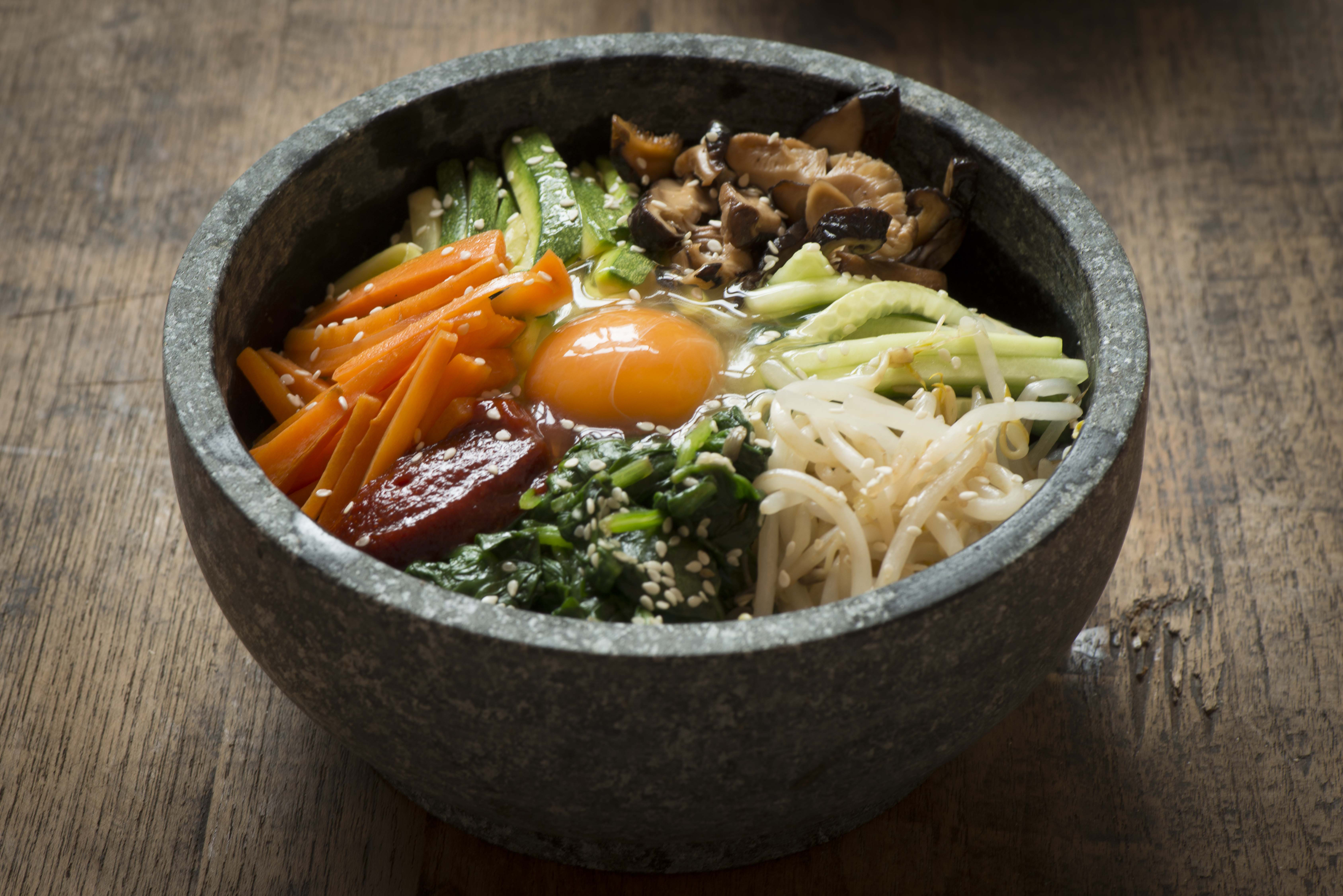
Bibimbap

Korean cuisine, hanguk yori, or hansik, has evolved through centuries of social and political change. Ingredients and dishes vary by province. There are many significant regional dishes that have proliferated in different variations across the country in the present day. The Korean royal court cuisine once brought all of the unique regional specialties together for the royal family. Meals consumed both by the royal family and ordinary citizens have been regulated by a unique culture of etiquette.

Korean cuisine is largely based on rice, noodles, tofu, vegetables, fish and meats. Traditional meals are noted for the number of side dishes, banchan, which accompany steam-cooked short-grain rice. Every meal is accompanied by numerous banchan. Kimchi, a fermented, usually spicy vegetable dish, is commonly served at every meal and is one of the best-known dishes. Korean cuisine usually involves heavy seasoning with sesame oil, doenjang (a type of fermented soybean paste), soy sauce, salt, garlic, ginger, and gochujang (a hot pepper paste). Other well-known dishes are bulgogi, grilled marinated beef; gimbap; and tteokbokki, a spicy snack consisting of rice cake seasoned with gochujang or a spicy chili paste.

Soups are also a common part of a meal and are served as part of the main course rather than at the beginning or the end of the meal. Soups known as guk are often made with meats, shellfish and vegetables. Similar to guk, tang has less water and is more often served in restaurants. Another type is jjigae, a stew that is typically heavily seasoned with chili pepper and served boiling hot.

Popular Korean alcoholic drinks include Soju, Makgeolli and Bokbunja ju. Korea is unique among East Asian countries in its use of metal chopsticks. Metal chopsticks have been discovered in Goguryeo archaeological sites.

=== Sports ===
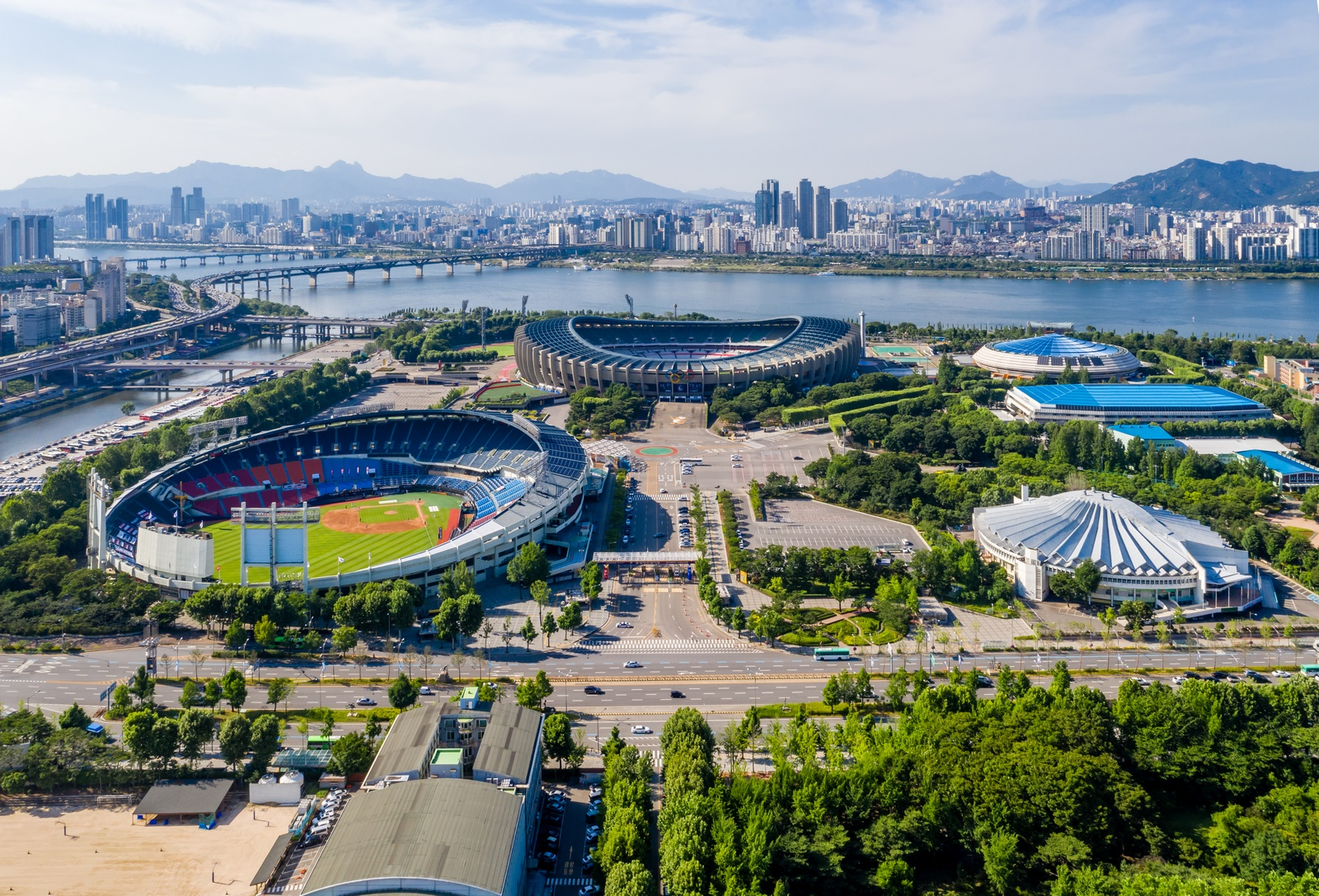
Seoul Sports Complex, Korea's largest integrated sports center

The martial art taekwondo originated in Korea. In the 1950s and 1960s, modern rules were standardized, with taekwondo becoming an official Olympic sport in 2000. Other Korean martial arts include Taekkyon, hapkido, Tang Soo Do, Kuk Sool Won, kumdo and subak.

Football has traditionally been regarded as the most popular sport in Korea, with baseball as the second. Recent polling indicates that a majority, 41% of South Korean sports fans continue to self-identify as football fans, with baseball ranked 2nd at 25% of respondents. However, the polling did not indicate the extent to which respondents follow both sports.

The national football team became the first team in the Asian Football Confederation to reach the FIFA World Cup semi-finals in the 2002 FIFA World Cup, jointly hosted by South Korea and Japan. The Korea Republic national team (as it is known) has qualified for every World Cup since Mexico 1986, and has broken out of the group stage in 2002, in 2010, when it was defeated by eventual semi-finalist Uruguay in the Round of 16, and in 2022. At the 2012 Summer Olympics, South Korea won the bronze medal for football.

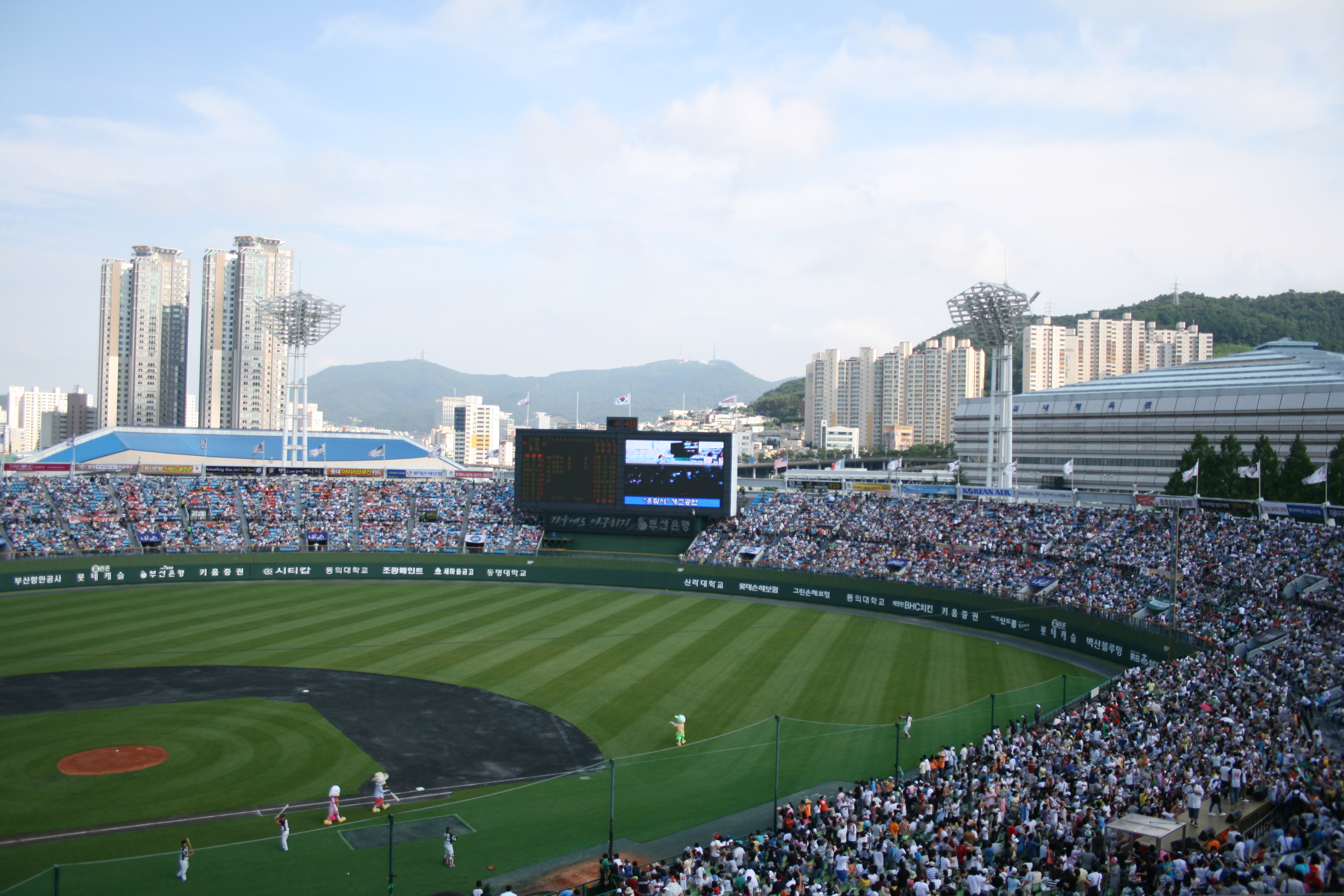
Sajik Baseball Stadium in Busan. Baseball is one of the most popular sports in South Korea.

Baseball was first introduced to Korea in 1905. Recent years have been characterized by increasing attendance and ticket prices for professional baseball games. The Korea Professional Baseball league, a 10-team circuit, was established in 1982. The South Korea national team finished third in the 2006 World Baseball Classic and second in the 2009 tournament. The team's 2009 final game against Japan was widely watched in Korea, with a large screen at Gwanghwamun crossing in Seoul broadcasting the game live. In the 2008 Summer Olympics, South Korea won the gold medal in baseball. Also in 1982, at the Baseball World Cup, Korea won the gold medal. At the 2010 Asian Games, the Korean National Baseball team won the gold medal. Several Korean players have gone on to play in Major League Baseball.

Basketball is a popular sport in the country as well. South Korea has traditionally had one of the top basketball teams in Asia and one of the continent's strongest basketball divisions. Seoul hosted the 1967 and 1995 Asian Basketball Championship. The Korea national basketball team has won a record number of 23 medals at the event to date.

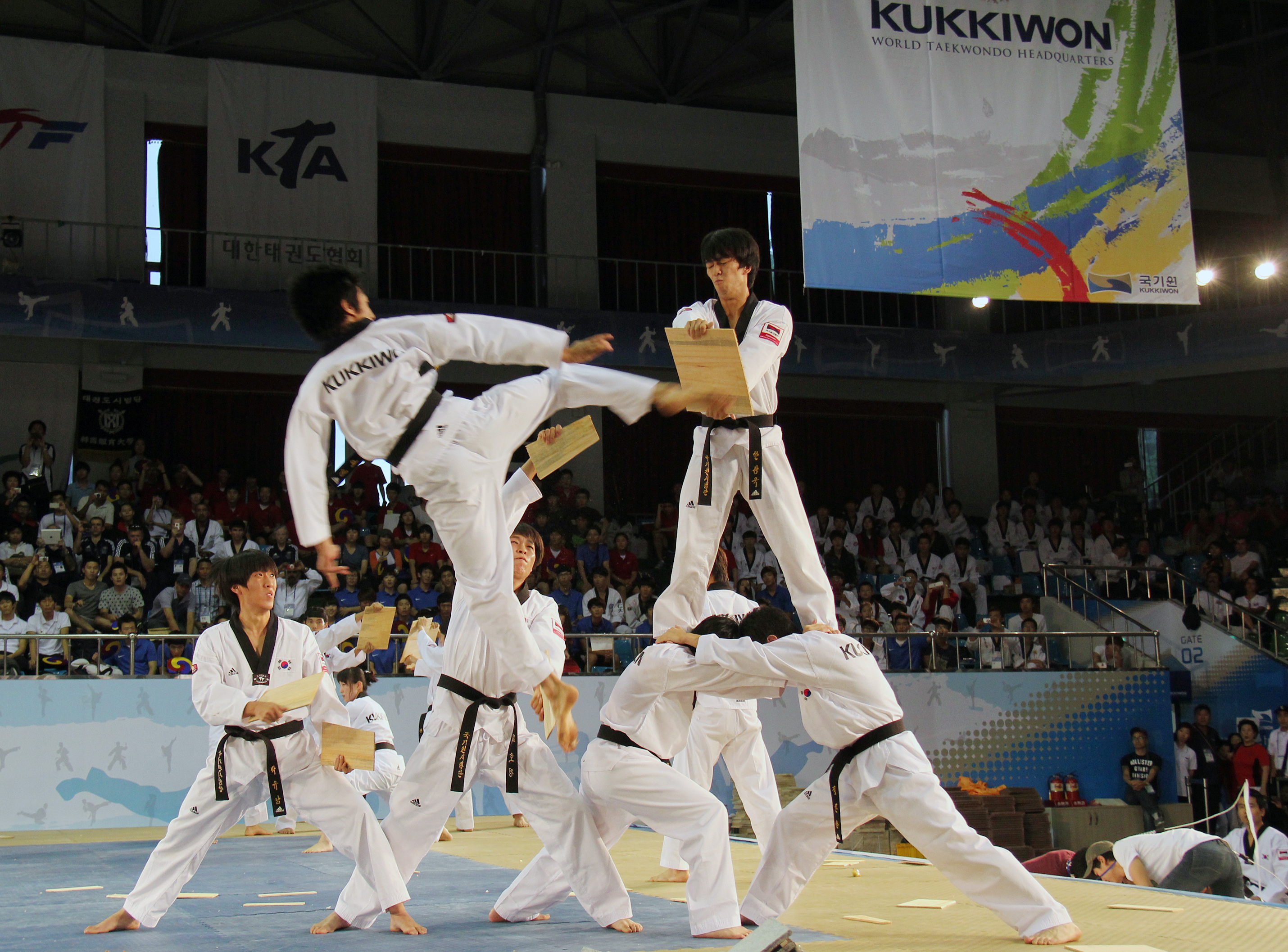
Taekwondo, a Korean martial art and Olympic sport

South Korea hosted the Asian Games in 1986 (Seoul), 2002 (Busan), and 2014 (Incheon). It also hosted the Winter Universiade in 1997, the Asian Winter Games in 1999, and the Summer Universiade in 2003 and 2015. In 1988, South Korea hosted the Summer Olympics in Seoul, coming fourth with 12 gold medals, 10 silver medals, and 11 bronze medals. South Korea regularly performs well in archery, shooting, table tennis, badminton, short track speed skating, handball, field hockey, freestyle wrestling, Greco-Roman wrestling, baseball, judo, taekwondo, speed skating, figure skating, and weightlifting. The Seoul Olympic Museum is dedicated to the 1988 Summer Olympics.

Pyeongchang hosted the 2018 Winter Olympics. South Korea has won more medals in the Winter Olympics than any other Asian country, with a total of 45 (23 gold, 14 silver, and 8 bronze). At the 2010 Winter Olympics, South Korea ranked fifth in the overall medal rankings. South Korea is especially strong in short track speed skating. Speed skating and figure skating are also popular, and ice hockey is an emerging sport, with Anyang Halla winning their first ever Asia League Ice Hockey title in March 2010.

Seoul World Cup Stadium in Seoul with a capacity of 66,704 seats

Seoul hosted a professional triathlon race, which is part of the International Triathlon Union (ITU) World Championship Series in 2010. In 2011, the South Korean city of Daegu hosted the 2011 IAAF World Championships in Athletics. In 2010, South Korea hosted its first Formula One race at the Korea International Circuit in Yeongam. The Korean Grand Prix was held from 2010 to 2013.

Domestic horse racing events are followed by South Koreans and Seoul Race Park in Gwacheon, Gyeonggi Province is located closest to Seoul out of the country's three tracks.

Competitive video gaming, better known as esports, has become more popular in South Korea in recent years, particularly among young people. The two most popular games are League of Legends and StarCraft. The gaming scene is managed by the Korean e-Sports Association.

== See also ==
- Outline of South Korea
- State Council of South Korea ("cabinet" of South Korea)
