= Iris Festival =

Regional annual public holiday in Brussels, Belgium

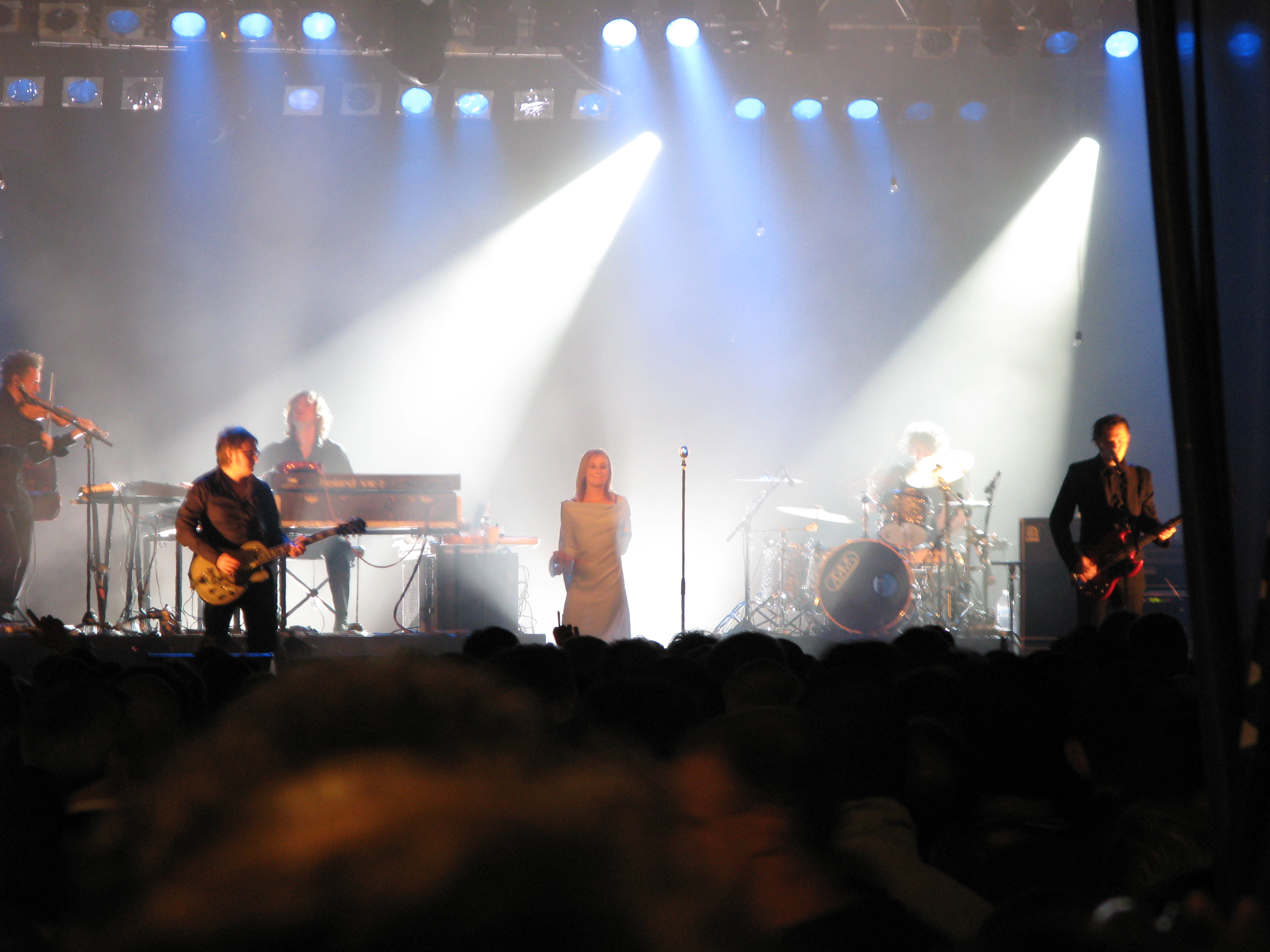
Concert of Hooverphonic at the 2007 Iris Festival

The Iris Festival (French: Fête de l'Iris; Dutch: Irisfeest) is the annual and official celebration of the Brussels-Capital Region in Belgium. It takes place on 8 May and is a day off for Brussels officials.

The date of 8 May was chosen for three reasons: it takes place during the flowering period of the yellow iris—also called flower of Lys—which is the symbol of the region and is pictured on its flag; it is the day of the victory against Nazi Germany during World War II; and it is also one of the feasts of Saint Michael the Archangel, patron saint of the City of Brussels.

During the multi-day party, free concerts, street entertainment and all kinds of activities are organised for the general public. Some monuments are exceptionally accessible to the public, and a food truck festival takes place on this day. In 2008, there were 100,000 participants at the festivities. Since 2015, Rock Around The Atomium, a free rock and roll music festival and vintage market, has also been organised at the Atomium on this weekend.

== See also ==
- Day of the Flemish Community
- French Community Holiday
- Day of the Walloon Region
- Day of the German-speaking Community
- Belgian National Day
