= National day =

Designated date on which celebrations mark the nationhood of a nation

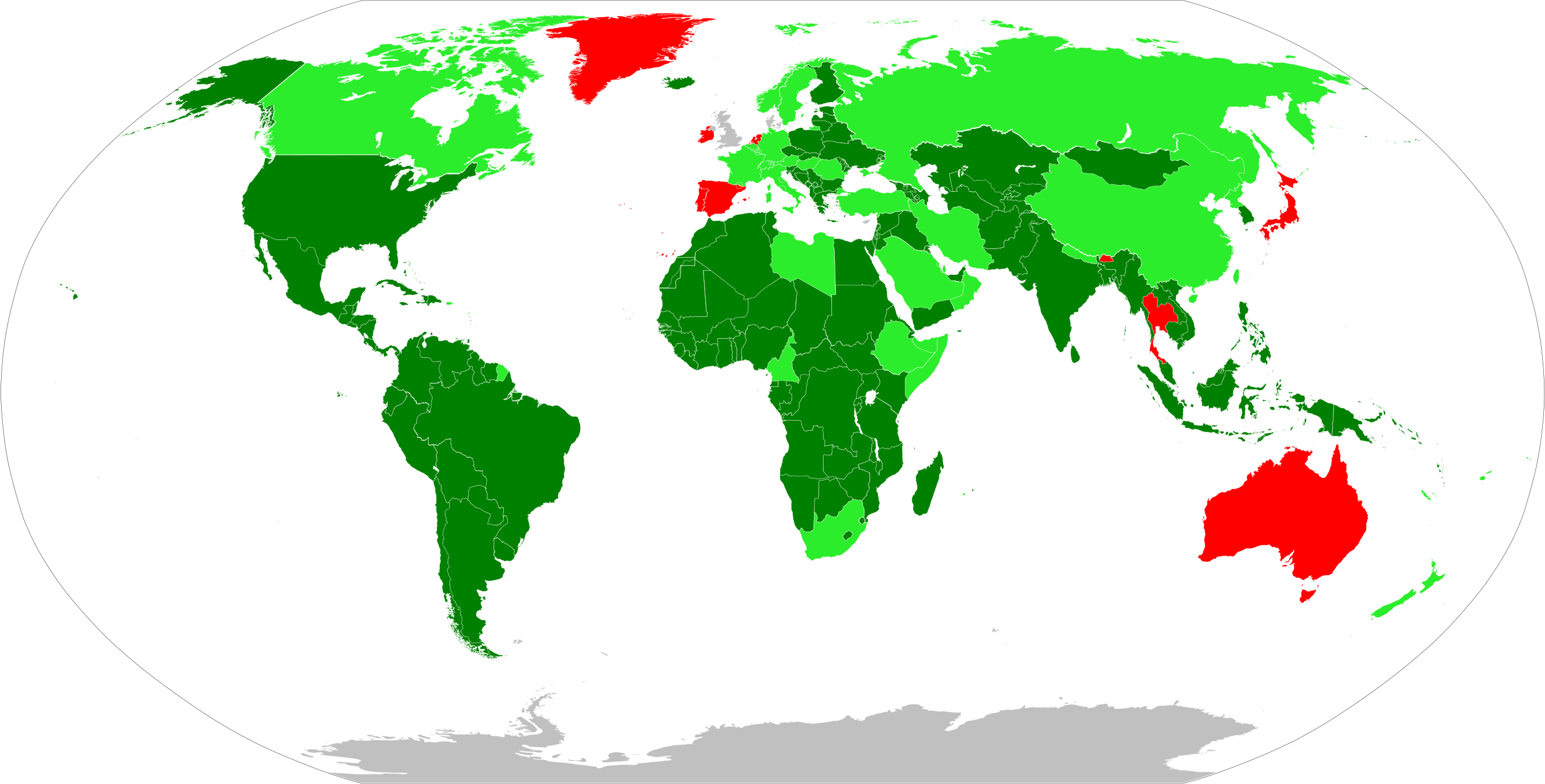
Independence-related national day Unification/revolution-related national day Other reasons for national day No official national day

A national day is a day on which celebrations mark the statehood or nationhood of a state or its people. It may be the date of independence, of becoming a republic, of becoming a federation, or a significant date for a patron saint, a ruler (such as a birthday, accession, or removal) or a date in that country's particular history .

The national day is often an official public holiday. Many countries have more than one national day. Denmark and the United Kingdom are the only countries without a national day. Denmark has what is not a public holiday but an unofficial celebration called Constitution Day. National days emerged with the age of nationalism, with most appearing during the 19th and 20th centuries.

National day may also be known as Independence Day, Liberation Day, or Republic Day, depending on the nation, and its history.

== List of national days ==
Nations that are not broadly recognized sovereign states are shown in pink. Defunct states are highlighted in light grey. For nations that are dependent on, or part of, a sovereign state (such as federal states, autonomous regions, or colonies), the name of the sovereign state is shown in parentheses.

Days that are not fixed to the Gregorian calendar are sorted by their occurrences.

Nation	Date	Significance	Description
Acadia (Canada)	15 August	National Acadian Day	Assumption Day was preferred over 24 June to remember that Acadians are descendants of France and a separate nation from the French Canadians.
Afghanistan	19 August	Independence Day	Independence from the United Kingdom and its control over Afghan foreign affairs in 1919.
African Union	25 May	Africa Day	Anniversary of the foundation of the Organisation of African Unity in 1963.
Åland (Finland)	9 June	Autonomy Day	It commemorates the first meeting of Åland County Council in 1922.
Albania	28 November	Independence Day	It commemorates the raising of the Albanian flag in Vlorë to announce the Albanian Declaration of Independence in 1912.
Alderney (British Islands)	15 December	Homecoming Day	It commemorates the return of the Islanders after the end of the German occupation of the Channel Islands during World War II in 1945.
Algeria	5 July	Independence Day	Independence from France in 1962.
Algeria	1 November	Revolution Day	Beginning of the Algerian War in 1954.
American Samoa (United States)	17 April	Flag Day	It commemorates the date American Samoa became a US territory and first flew the US flag in 1900. This date also marks the day the Flag of American Samoa was adopted in 1960.
Andalusia (Spain)	28 February	Andalusia Day	It commemorates the date of the referendum on the Statute of Autonomy that established Andalusia as an autonomous community in 1980.
Andorra	8 September	Our Lady of Meritxell Day	Feast day of Our Lady of Meritxell, patron saint of Andorra. As well is the date of the signing of the first Paréage of Andorra in 1278.
Angola	11 November	Independence Day	Independence from Portugal in 1975.
Anguilla (United Kingdom)	30 May	Anguilla Day	It commemorates the beginning of the Anguillian Revolution in 1967.
Antigua and Barbuda	1 November	Independence Day	Independence from the United Kingdom in 1981.
Aragon (Spain)	23 April	Saint George's Day	Feast day of Saint George, patron saint of Aragon and his Crown. An old legend holds that during the battle of Alcoraz in 1096, Saint George appeared in support of the Aragonese army force.
Argentina	25 May	May Revolution Day	It commemorates the May Revolution and creation of the First National Government in 1810.
Argentina	9 July	Independence Day	Anniversary of the Declaration of Independence from Spain in 1816.
Armenia	28 May	Republic Day	Independence from the Transcaucasian Democratic Federative Republic and establishment of the First Republic of Armenia in 1918.
Armenia	21 September	Independence Day	Independence from the Soviet Union recognised in 1991.
Aruba (Kingdom of the Netherlands)	18 March	National Anthem and Flag Day	It commemorates the adoption of the national flag of Aruba and the official anthem in 1976.
Ascension (United Kingdom)	3rd Saturday in June		King's Official Birthday
Association of Southeast Asian Nations (ASEAN)	8 August	ASEAN Day	Commemorates the signing of the ASEAN Declaration in Bangkok on 8 August 1967 by five Foreign Ministers, marking the establishment of the Association of Southeast Asian Nations (ASEAN).
Asturias (Spain)	8 September	Our Lady of Covadonga Day	Feast of Our Lady of Covadonga, patron saint of Asturias.
Australia	26 January	Australia Day	It commemorates the establishment of a British prison settlement at Port Jackson in New Holland by Captain Arthur Phillip in 1788.
Austria	26 October	Austrian National Day	It commemorates the enactment of the Austrian Declaration of Neutrality in 1955.
Azerbaijan	28 May	Independence Day	Independence from the Transcaucasian Democratic Federative Republic in 1918.
Azores (Portugal)	Pentecost Monday	Azores Day	It commemorates the establishment of political autonomy within the Portuguese laws, following the Carnation Revolution, in 1976.
Bahamas	10 July	Independence Day	Independence from the United Kingdom in 1973.
Bahrain	16 December	National Day	It commemorates the coronation of Isa bin Salman Al Khalifa, the first Emir of Bahrain, in 1961.
Balearic Islands (Spain)	1 March	Day of the Balearic Islands	It commemorates the date that the Statute of Autonomy establishing the Balearic Islands as an autonomous community became effective in 1983.
Bangladesh	26 March	Independence Day	Anniversary of the Declaration of Independence from Pakistan in 1971.
Bangladesh	16 December	Victory Day	It commemorates the Surrender of Pakistan, ending the Bangladesh Liberation War, in 1971.
Barbados	30 November	Independence Day	Independence from the United Kingdom in 1966. As well is the anniversary of the formal proclamation of Barbados as a Republic within the Commonwealth in 2021.
Basque Country (Spain)	Easter Sunday (unofficial)	Aberri Eguna (Fatherland Day)	No official National Day. Fatherland Day is the unofficial Basque national holiday, associated with Basque nationalism. From 2011 to 2013 the official national day was on 25 October.
Belarus	3 July	Independence Day	It commemorates the liberation of Minsk from German occupation by Soviet troops in 1944.
Belgium	21 July	National Day	It commemorates when Leopold of Saxe-Coburg-Saalfeld takes the oath as the first King of the Belgians in 1831.
Belize	21 September	Independence Day	Independence from the United Kingdom in 1981.
Benin	1 August	Independence Day	Independence from France in 1960.
Bermuda (United Kingdom)	4th Friday in May	Bermuda Day	It commemorates the islands' heritage and culture. Previously was known as Queen Victoria's birthday and celebrated on 24 May.
Bhutan	17 December	National Day	It commemorates when Ugyen Wangchuck was elected and enthroned as the first hereditary King of Bhutan in 1907.
Bolivia	6 August	Independence Day	Anniversary of the Declaration of Independence from Spain in 1825.
Botswana	30 September	Independence Day	Independence from the United Kingdom in 1966.
Brazil	7 September	Independence Day	Anniversary of the Declaration of Independence from Portugal in 1822.
British Empire	24 May	Empire Day	Observed from 1890s to 1957. In 1958, the celebration was renamed from Empire Day to Commonwealth Day.
British Virgin Islands (United Kingdom)	1 July	Virgin Islands Day	It commemorates the day on which BVI gained self-governing status within British control in 1967. Previously was known as Colony Day and later as Territory Day.
Brunei	23 February	National Day	It commemorates the independence from the United Kingdom in 1984, which actually occurred on 1 January.
Brussels-Capital Region (Belgium)	8 May	Iris Day	It commemorates the blooming season of the iris (also called fleur de Lys), which is the symbol of the Region. Also commemorates the victory day over the Nazis in World War II and a former feast day of Saint Michael, patron saint of the Region.
Bulgaria	3 March	Liberation Day	It commemorates the signing of the Treaty of San Stefano, that provided autonomy within Ottoman Empire in 1878.
Burkina Faso	11 December	National Day	It commemorates the establishment of a self-governing state within the French Community in 1958.
Burundi	1 July	Independence Day	Independence from Belgium in 1962.
Cambodia	9 November	Independence Day	Independence from France in 1953.
Cameroon	20 May	National Day	It commemorates the creation of a unitary state in 1972.
Canada	1 July	Canada Day	It commemorates the creation of Canadian Confederation, the process by Province of Canada, Nova Scotia, and New Brunswick were united into one federation called the Dominion of Canada in 1867.
Canary Islands (Spain)	30 May	Day of the Canary Islands	It commemorates the anniversary of the first session of the Parliament of the Canary Islands in 1983.
Cantabria (Spain)	28 July (unofficial)	Cantabria Institutions Day	No official Regional Day. Cantabria Institutions Day commemorates the establishment of the province in 1778.
Castilla–La Mancha (Spain)	31 May	Castilla–La Mancha Day	It commemorates the anniversary of the first session of the Cortes of Castilla–La Mancha in 1983.
Castilla y León (Spain)	23 April	Castile and León Day	It commemorates the anniversary of the Battle of Villalar and the Revolt of the Comuneros in 1521.
Catalonia (Spain)	11 September	National Day	It commemorates the fall of Barcelona during the War of the Spanish Succession in 1714.
Cape Verde	5 July	Independence Day	Independence from Portugal in 1975.
Cayman Islands (United Kingdom)	1st Monday in July	Constitution Day	It commemorates the adoption of the Constitution of the West Indies Federation in 1959.
Central African Republic	1 December	National Day	It commemorates the anniversary of becoming an autonomous territory within the French Community in 1958.
Ceuta (Spain)	2 September	Ceuta Day	It commemorates when Pedro de Meneses, 1st Count of Vila Real becomes the first Governor of Ceuta after the Conquest of Ceuta in 1415.
Chad	11 August	Independence Day	Independence from France in 1960.
Chile	18 September	Independence Day	It commemorates when the first Government Junta was created in 1810.
China	1 October	National Day	It commemorates the founding of the People's Republic of China in 1949.
Colombia	20 July	Independence Day	Anniversary of the Declaration of Independence from Spain in 1810.
Commonwealth of Nations	2nd Monday in March	Commonwealth Day	Until 1958 was known as Empire Day.
Comoros	6 July	National Day	Independence from France in 1975.
Democratic Republic of the Congo	30 June	Independence Day	Independence from Belgium in 1960.
Republic of the Congo	15 August	National Day	Independence from France in 1960.
Cook Islands	4 August	Constitution Day	It commemorates the self-government in free association with New Zealand in 1965.
Costa Rica	15 September	Independence Day	Independence from the Kingdom of Spain in 1821.
Croatia	30 May	National Day	It commemorates when the multi-party Parliament was constituted in 1990.
Cuba	1 January	Liberation Day	It commemorates the Cuban Revolution and the overthrow of the Batista regime in 1959.
Cuba	10 October	Independence Day	Independence from the Spanish Empire in 1868.
Curaçao (Kingdom of the Netherlands)	2 July	National Anthem and Flag Day	It commemorates when the first island council was elected and instituted in 1954.
Cyprus	1 October	Independence Day	Independence from the United Kingdom in 1960.
Czech Republic	28 October	Independent Czechoslovak State Day	Independence from Austria-Hungary and creation of Czechoslovakia in 1918.
Denmark	5 June	Constitution Day	Constitution Day is the unofficial national holiday of Denmark, which has no official National Day. It commemorates the signing as both the first Constitution in 1849 and the current constitution in 1953.
Djibouti	27 June	Independence Day	Independence from France in 1977.
Dominica	3 November	Independence Day	Independence from the United Kingdom in 1978. As well is the date when the island was discovered by Christopher Columbus in 1493.
Dominican Republic	27 February	Independence Day	Independence from Haiti in 1844.
Ecuador	10 August	Independence Day	Proclamation of independence from Spain in 1809
Egypt	23 July	Revolution Day	Commemorating the revolution of 1952
El Salvador	15 September	Independence Day	Independence from the Kingdom of Spain in 1821
England (United Kingdom)	23 April	Saint George's Day	Feast day of Saint George, patron saint of England
Equatorial Guinea	12 October	Independence Day	Independence from Spain in 1968
Eritrea	24 May	Independence Day	Eritrean People's Liberation Front (EPLF) fighters enter Asmara in 1991 and Eritrea becomes a de facto independent state; United Nations recognizes Eritrea's independence from Ethiopia in 1993 after a UN-supervised referendum on nationhood.
Estonia	24 February	Independence Day	Anniversary of the Republic of Estonia on the date of its declaration of independence from Russia in 1918
Eswatini	6 September	Independence Day	Independence from the United Kingdom in 1968
Ethiopia	28 May	Downfall of the Derg Day	The Derg regime is defeated in 1991
European Union	9 May	Europe Day	Commemorating the Schuman Declaration of 1950
Extremadura (Spain)	8 September	Our Lady of Guadalupe Day	Feast of Our Lady of Guadalupe, patron saint of Extremadura
Falkland Islands (United Kingdom)	14 June	Liberation Day	Liberation from Argentinean occupation at the end of the Falklands War in 1982
Faroe Islands (Denmark)	29 July	Ólavsøka	Saint Olaf's death at the Battle of Stiklestad in 1030: opening of the Løgting (parliament) session
Federation of Bosnia and Herzegovina (Bosnia and Herzegovina)	1 March	Independence Day	Referendum on independence from Yugoslavia in 1992
Federation of Bosnia and Herzegovina (Bosnia and Herzegovina)	25 November	Statehood Day	Formation of the State Anti-fascist Council for the National Liberation of Bosnia and Herzegovina in 1943
Fiji	10 October	Fiji Day	Independence from the United Kingdom in 1970
Finland	6 December	Independence Day	Declaration of independence from Russia in 1917
Flanders (Belgium)	11 July	Feestdag van de Vlaamse Gemeenschap	Battle of the Golden Spurs on 11 July 1302.
Florida (United States)	2 April	Pascua Florida	Day or week (as declared by the Governor) celebrating the founding of Florida by Juan Ponce de León on 2 April 1513.
France	14 July	Bastille Day	Bastille Day (known as la Fête Nationale in France), commemorating the storming of the Bastille on 14 July 1789
French Community (Belgium)	27 September	French Community Holiday	Establishment of the Provisional Government of Belgium during the Belgian Revolution in 1830
French Guiana (France)	10 June		Abolition of Slavery Day
French Polynesia (France)	29 June	Internal Autonomy Day	Annexation of the Kingdom of Tahiti by France in 1880
Gabon	17 August	Independence Day	Independence from France in 1960
Galicia (Spain)	25 July	National Day	Commemorates the Feast of Saint James, patron saint of Galicia
Gambia, The	18 February	Independence Day	Independence from the United Kingdom in 1965
Georgia	26 May	Day of First Republic	Declaration of independence from Russia in 1918
German Empire	18 January		Proclamation of the German Empire on 18 January 1871 in the Palace of Versailles.
East Germany	7 October	Republic Day	Declaration of the German Democratic Republic in 1949
German-speaking Community (Belgium)	15 November	Day of the German-speaking Community	Coincides with the day of the King's Feast
Germany	3 October	German Unity Day	Unification of West Germany and East Germany in 1990
Ghana	6 March	Independence Day	Independence from the United Kingdom in 1957
Gibraltar (United Kingdom)	10 September	Gibraltar National Day	People of Gibraltar vote to reject Spanish sovereignty or association in 1967
Greece	25 March	Independence Day	Start of the Greek Revolution against the Ottoman Empire in 1821
Greece	28 October	Ohi Day	Refusal to the surrender the country on the Italian troops, and honour at the dead during the Greco-Italian War and the Greek Resistance against the Axis in 1940–1944
Greenland (Denmark)	21 June	Greenland National Day	(Longest Day of the Year) Greenland National Day was introduced in 1983 as one of the Home Rule's traditions and is thus one of several expressions of national identity
Grenada	7 February	Independence Day	Independence from United Kingdom in 1974
Guadeloupe (France)	27 September		Abolition of Slavery Day
Guam (United States)	21 July	Liberation Day	American landing on Guam 1944, the beginning of the Battle of Guam
Guatemala	15 September	Independence Day	Independence from the Kingdom of Spain in 1821
Guernsey (British Islands)	9 May	Liberation Day	The end of the German occupation of the Channel Islands in 1945
Guinea	2 October	Independence Day	Independence from France in 1958
Guinea-Bissau	24 September	Independence Day	Declaration of independence from Portugal in 1973
Guyana	23 February	Mashramani	Declaration of the Republic in 1970
Guyana	26 May	Independence Day	Declaration of independence from the United Kingdom in 1966
Haiti	1 January	Independence Day	Declaration of independence from France in 1804
Herm (British Islands)	9 May	Liberation Day	The end of the German occupation of the Channel Islands in 1945
Honduras	15 September	Independence Day	Independence from the Kingdom of Spain in 1821
Hong Kong (China)	1 July	Establishment Day	Transfer of sovereignty to the PRC in 1997
Hong Kong (China)	1 October	National Day of the PRC	Proclamation of the People's Republic of China in 1949
Hungary	15 March	1848 Revolution Memorial Day	Commemorating the 1848 Revolution
Hungary	20 August	Saint Stephen's Day	Feast day of Saint Stephen, patron saint of Hungary and first King of Hungary, crowned in 1000 and canonized in 1083
Hungary	23 October	1956 Revolution Memorial Day	Commemorating the 1956 Revolution
Iceland	17 June	National Day	Founding of the Republic and dissolution of the personal union with Denmark in 1944
India	26 January	Republic Day	Adoption of the Constitution of India in 1950
India	15 August	Independence Day	Independence from the British Empire in 1947
India	2 October	Gandhi Jayanti	Birth anniversary of Mahatma Gandhi (Father of the Nation) in 1869
Indonesia	17 August	Independence Day	Proclamation of Independence (Hari Proklamasi Kemerdekaan R.I.) from the kingdom of the Netherlands in 1945
Iran	11 February	Islamic Revolution's Victory Day (Fajr decade)	Victory of the Islamic Revolution in 1979
Iran	1 April	Iranian Islamic Republic Day	Announcement of the successful results of the referendum to abolish the Iranian monarchy in 1979
Iraq	3 October	Independence Day	Independence from the United Kingdom in 1932
Ireland	17 March	Saint Patrick's Day	Feast day of Saint Patrick, the patron saint of Ireland
Isle of Man (British Islands)	5 July	Tynwald Day	Annual festive outdoor meeting of the Tynwald (parliament)
Israel	14 May	Independence Day	Proclamation of independence from the British Mandate of Palestine in 1948 (date varies according to Jewish calendar on 5 Iyar.)
Italy	2 June	Republic Day	It is the Italian National Day and Republic Day, which is celebrated on 2 June each year, with the main celebration taking place in Rome. It is one of the national symbols of Italy. The day commemorates the 1946 Italian institutional referendum held by universal suffrage, in which the Italian people were called to the polls to decide on the form of government following the Second World War and the fall of Fascism. The ceremony of the event, organized in Rome, includes the deposition of a laurel wreath as a tribute to the Italian Unknown Soldier at the Altare della Patria by the President of the Italian Republic and a military parade along Via dei Fori Imperiali in Rome.
Ivory Coast	7 August	Independence Day	Independence from France in 1960.
Jamaica	6 August	Independence Day	Independence from the United Kingdom in 1962
Japan	11 February	National Foundation Day	Jimmu, the first emperor, is crowned in 660 BC
Jersey (British Islands)	9 May	Liberation Day	The end of the German occupation of the Channel Islands in 1945
Jordan	25 May	Independence Day	Independence from the United Kingdom in 1946
Kazakhstan	16 December	Independence Day	Independence from the Soviet Union in 1991
Kenya	12 December	Jamhuri Day	Independence from the United Kingdom in 1963; made a republic in 1964
Kiribati	12 July	Independence Day	Independence from the United Kingdom in 1979
Kosovo (disputed)	17 February	Independence Day	Unilateral declaration of independence from Serbia in 2008
Kurdistan (Iraq)	21 March		Nowruz, Persian New Year, celebrated on the spring equinox
Kuwait	25 February		National Day, anniversary of the 1950 coronation of Abdullah Al-Salim Al-Sabah, who won Kuwait's independence from the British Empire eleven years later
Kyrgyzstan	31 August	Independence Day	Independence Day, declaration of independence from the Soviet Union in 1991
Laos	2 December		National Day, declaration of the People's Republic in 1975
La Rioja (Spain)	9 June		Anniversary of the approval of La Rioja's Statute of Autonomy establishing it as an autonomous community
Latvia	18 November		Proclamation Day of the Republic of Latvia, independence from the Russian Empire in 1918
Lebanon	22 November	Independence Day	Independence from France in 1943
Lesotho	4 October	Independence Day	Independence from the United Kingdom in 1966
Liberia	26 July		Proclamation of the Republic: independence from the United States in 1847
Libya	24 December	Independence Day	Anniversary of Libyan independence in 1951
Liechtenstein	15 August		Liechtenstein National Day, Feast of the Assumption and birth of Prince Franz Joseph II in 1906
Lithuania	16 February		Lithuanian State Reestablishment Day, declaration of independence from the Russian and German Empires in 1918
Lombardy (Italy)	29 May		Lombard League defeats the imperial army of Frederick Barbarossa in the Battle of Legnano
Luxembourg	23 June		Grand Duke's Official Birthday
Macau (China)	1 October		National Day of the People's Republic of China (Proclamation of the People's Republic of China in 1949)
Macau (China)	20 December		Transfer of sovereignty to the PRC in 1999
Madagascar	26 June	Independence Day	Independence from France in 1960
Madeira (Portugal)	1 July		Madeira Day, day of autonomy within Portugal in 1976
Madrid (Spain)	2 May		Dos de Mayo Uprising, part of the Peninsular War, a civilian rebellion against the French occupation of the city
Malawi	6 July	Independence Day	Independence from the United Kingdom in 1964; declaration of the Republic in 1966
Malaysia	31 August		Hari Kebangsaan, independence from the United Kingdom (as Malaya) in 1957. Also known as Hari Kebangsaan (National Day) in Malay.
Malaysia	16 September		Malaysia Day, formation of Malaysia by uniting Malaya, Sabah, Sarawak, and Singapore into a single country in 1963. Proposed to be the second national day after Hari Merdeka.
Maldives	26 July	Independence Day	Independence from the British Empire in 1965
Mali	22 September	Independence Day	Independence from the Mali Federation in 1960
Malta	31 March	Freedom Day	Freedom Day, withdrawal of the last British troops from Malta in 1979
Malta	7 June	Sette Giugno	Sette Giugno, bread riot of 1919 in which 4 Maltese men died
Malta	8 September	Victory Day	Victory Day, celebrating the victory of the Knights of St. John over the Ottoman Empire in the Great Siege of Malta in 1565, the end of the French occupation in 1800, and the surrender of Italy to the Allies in 1943
Malta	21 September	Independence Day	Independence Day, independence from the United Kingdom in 1964
Malta	13 December	Republic Day	Republic Day, adoption of the republican constitution of 1974
Marshall Islands	1 May		Constitution Day, adoption of the Compact of Free Association in 1979
Martinique (France)	22 May		Abolition of Slavery Day
Mauritania	28 November		Independence from France in 1960
Mauritius	12 March	Independence Day	Independence Day - Independence from the United Kingdom in 1968; formation of the Republic in 1992
Mayotte (France)	27 April		Abolition of Slavery Day
Melilla (Spain)	17 September		Anniversary of the 1497 Conquest of Melilla by the Duke of Medina Sidonia
Mexico	16 September	Independence Day	Grito de Dolores, beginning of the War of Independence from Spain in 1810
Micronesia	3 November	Independence Day	Independence from the US-administered UN Trusteeship in 1979
Minas Gerais (Brazil)	21 April		Hanging of Tiradentes in 1792
Minas Gerais (Brazil)	16 July		Elevation of the village of Mariana to the status of city.
Moldova	27 August		Independence Day, declaration of independence from the Soviet Union in 1991
Monaco	19 November	National Day	H.S.H. the Sovereign Prince's Day in 2005
Mongolia	26 November		Republic Day, proclamation of the Mongolian People's Republic in 1924
Mongolia	29 December	Independence Day	Independence Day, this day commemorates the independence from China in 1911.
Montenegro	21 May		Independence from Serbia and Montenegro in 2006
Montenegro	13 July		recognised as independent at the Congress of Berlin in 1878
Montserrat (United Kingdom)	3rd Saturday in June		King's Official Birthday
Morocco	18 November		Accession of Muhammad V to the throne in 1927
Mozambique	25 June	Independence Day	Independence from Portugal in 1975
Murcia (Spain)	9 June		Anniversary of the approval of the Region of Murcia's Statute of Autonomy establishing it as an autonomous community
Myanmar	10th day of Tazaungmon		Commemorates the anniversary of the first university student strike at Rangoon University in 1920 Note: Not to be confused with Independence Day (Myanmar)
Namibia	21 March		Independence from South Africa in 1990
Nauru	31 January		Independence from the Australia, NZ, and UK-administered UN trusteeship 1968
Navarre (Spain)	3 December		Feast of Saint Francis Xavier, patron saint of Navarre
Nepal	19 September		Constitution Day, commemorating the adoption of the Constitution in 2015
Kingdom of the Netherlands	27 April		King's Day, King Willem-Alexander's birthday in 1967
Kingdom of the Netherlands	5 May		Liberation Day, end of German occupation in 1945
New Caledonia (France)	24 September	Citizenship Day	Annexation to France in 1853
New Zealand	6 February	Waitangi Day	Signing of the Treaty of Waitangi in 1840
Nicaragua	15 September	Independence Day	Independence from the Kingdom of Spain in 1821
Niger	18 December		Republic Day, made an autonomous state within the French Community in 1958
Nigeria	1 October		Independence from the United Kingdom in 1960
Niue	19 October		Self-government in free association with New Zealand in 1974
Norfolk Island (Australia)	8 June		Beginning of permanent settlement of the island by migrants from the Pitcairn Islands in 1856
North Korea	15 August		Liberation from Japanese rule in 1945 (Chogukhaebangŭi nal)
North Korea	9 September		Day of the Foundation of the Republic in 1948
North Korea	10 October		Party Foundation Day in 1945
North Macedonia	2 August		Republic Day, proclamation of statehood in 1944 and proclamation of Kruševo Republic in 1903 during the Ilinden Uprising
North Macedonia	8 September		Independence Day (Den na nezavisnosta), declaration of independence from Yugoslavia in 1991
Northern Ireland (United Kingdom)	17 March	Saint Patrick's Day	Feast day of Saint Patrick, the patron saint of Ireland; a public holiday sometimes associated with Irish nationalism
Northern Ireland (United Kingdom)	12 July	The Twelfth (Orangemens' Day)	Commemorates the Battle of the Boyne in 1690; a public holiday associated with Ulster unionism
Northern Mariana Islands (United States)	8 January		Commonwealth Day, the constitutional government takes office in 1978
Norway	17 May		Constitution Day, the signing of the Norwegian Constitution in Eidsvoll 1814
Oman	20 November		National Day of Oman, Day of Al Busaid family ruling Oman in 1744
Pakistan	23 March		Pakistan Day, the Pakistan Resolution passed in Lahore in 1940. Pakistan became a Republic in 1956 with the 1956 Constitution of Pakistan.
Pakistan	14 August		Independence Day, independence from the British Empire in 1947
Palau	9 July		Constitution Day, adoption of the Constitution in 1980
Palau	1 October	Independence Day	Independence Day, full independence in 1994
Palestine	15 November	Independence Day	Declaration of independence in 1988
Panama	3 November	Separation Day	Independence from Colombia in 1903
Panama	28 November	Independence Day	Independence from the Kingdom of Spain in 1821
Papua New Guinea	16 September		Independence from Australia in 1975
Paraguay	14 May	Independence Day	Declaration of independence from Spain in 1811
Peru	28 July	Independence Day	Declaration of independence from Spain in 1821
Philippines	12 June	Independence Day	Commemorates the declaration of independence from Spain in 1898, officially known as Araw ng Kasarinlan but more commonly called as Araw ng Kalayaan.
Pitcairn Islands (United Kingdom)	3rd Saturday in June		King's Official Birthday
Poland	3 May	Constitution Day	Celebrates the declaration of the Constitution of 3 May 1791, first constitution of its kind in Europe
Poland	11 November	Independence Day	Restoration of independence from Austria-Hungary, Germany, and Russia in 1918
Portugal	10 June	Portugal Day	Officially the Day of Portugal, Camões, and the Portuguese Communities, commemorates the death of national poet Luís de Camões in 1580
Puerto Rico (United States)	25 July	Constitution Day	Commemorates the establishment of the Commonwealth of Puerto Rico in 1952; formerly Invasion Day, day of the American invasion in 1898
Puerto Rico (United States)	23 September	Grito de Lares	Grito de Lares, also known as Independence Day, celebrates the first revolt for independence from the Spanish Empire in 1868
Qatar	18 December		Qatar National Day, the assumption of power by Emir Jassim bin Mohammed Al Thani in 1878
Québec (Canada)	24 June		Saint-Jean-Baptiste Day, feast day of John the Baptist, the patron saint of French Canadians
Rio Grande do Sul (Brazil)	20 September		Expulsion of the Brazilian Army from Porto Alegre at the Farroupilha Revolution, followed by a Declaration of Independence on 1836.
Romania	1 December		Great Union Day, unification with Transylvania and achievement of the Great Union in 1918
Russia	12 June		Russia Day, Declaration of State Sovereignty in 1990
Russia	4 November		Unity Day, celebrates the end of Time of Troubles
Rwanda	1 July		Independence from Belgium in 1962
Réunion (France)	20 December		Abolition of Slavery Day
Saba (Kingdom of the Netherlands)	1st Friday in December		Saba Day celebrates, on the first Friday in December, the adoption of the flag of Saba in December 1985
Sabah (Malaysia)	31 August		Sabah Day, is celebrated to commemorate Sabah's independence from United Kingdom before joining Malaysia along with Sarawak and Singapore on 16 September 1963. It has since been celebrated since 2023.
Saint Helena (United Kingdom)	3rd Saturday in June		King's Official Birthday
Saint Kitts and Nevis	19 September		Independence from the United Kingdom in 1983
Saint Lucia	22 February	Independence Day	Independence Day, independence from the United Kingdom in 1979
Saint Vincent and the Grenadines	27 October	Independence Day	Independence Day, independence from the United Kingdom in 1979
Samoa	1 June	Independence Day	Independence Day, independence from New Zealand in 1962
San Marino	3 September		Foundation of the city by Marinus in year 301 (traditional date); also is the St. Marinus Day.
Sardinia (Italy)	28 April		Sardinian revolution and expulsion of Piedmontese Viceroy and Sardinian-Piedmontese officials from Cagliari, capital and largest city of Sardinia
São Paulo (Brazil)	9 July		Constitutionalist Revolt against Vargas Regime in 1932
Sarawak (Malaysia)	22 July		Sarawak Independence Day, independence from United Kingdom before joining Malaysia along with Sabah and Singapore on 16 September.
Sark (British Islands)	10 May		Liberation Day, the end of the German occupation of the Channel Islands in 1945
Saudi Arabia	23 September	Saudi National Day	Renaming and proclamation of the Kingdom of Hejaz and Nejd and Its Dependencies as the Kingdom of Saudi Arabia on 23 September 1932.
Scotland (United Kingdom)	30 November	Saint Andrew's Day	Feast day of Saint Andrew, patron saint of Scotland
Senegal	4 April		Independence from France in 1960
Serbia	15 February		National Day, start of the Serbian Revolution against Ottoman Empire in 1804; Constitution Day, adoption of the first Constitution in 1835
Seychelles	18 June		Constitution Day, adoption of a multi-party democratic constitution in 1993.
Seychelles	29 June		National Day, marks the date when Seychelles gained independence from the United Kingdom in 1976.
Sierra Leone	27 April		Republic Day, independence from the United Kingdom in 1961
Singapore	9 August		National Day, independence from Malaysia in 1965
Sint Maarten (Kingdom of the Netherlands)	11 November		Sint Maarten's Day
Slovakia	29 August		Slovak National Uprising Anniversary, this day commemorates when Slovakia in 1944 rose up against Nazi Germany
Slovenia	25 June		Statehood Day, declaration of independence from Yugoslavia in 1991
Solomon Islands	7 July	Independence Day	Independence Day, independence from the United Kingdom in 1978
Somalia	1 July	Independence Day	Independence from Italy and unification with Somaliland in 1960
Somaliland (Disputed)	18 May		Declaration of independence from Somalia in 1991
Somaliland (Disputed)	26 June	Independence Day	Independence of the State of Somaliland from the United Kingdom in 1960
South Africa	27 April		Freedom Day, first democratic general election in 1994
South Georgia and the South Sandwich Islands (United Kingdom)	3rd Saturday in June		Liberation from Argentina at the end of the Falklands War in 1982 and King's Official Birthday
South Korea	1 March		Declaration of independence from the Empire of Japan in 1919
South Korea	15 August		Liberation from Japanese rule in 1945 (Gwangbokjeol); declaration of the Republic in 1948
South Korea	3 October		Gaecheonjeol, ancient Korea founded in 2333 BC
South Sudan	9 July		Independence Day, independence from Sudan in 2011
South Vietnam	26 October		1955 South Vietnam referendum created First Republic of Vietnam replacing State of Vietnam
South Vietnam	1 November		1963 South Vietnam coup d'état created Second Republic of Vietnam replacing First Republic of Vietnam
Soviet Union	7 November		October Revolution Day, commemorating the Great October Socialist Revolution in 1917
Spain	12 October	National Day	Commemorates Christopher Columbus' discovery of the Americas in 1492
Sri Lanka	4 February		Independence Day, independence from the United Kingdom in 1948 under the name of Ceylon
Republika Srpska (Bosnia and Herzegovina)	9 January		Proclamation of the Republic, separate from Bosnia and Herzegovina and part of Yugoslavia, in 1992
Sudan	1 January		Independence from the United Kingdom in 1956
Suriname	25 November		Independence Day, independence from the Netherlands in 1975
Sweden	6 June		National Day: election of Gustav Vasa as King of Sweden in 1523; adoption of the constitutions of 1809 and 1974
Switzerland	1 August	National Day	National Day, alliance between Uri, Schwyz and Unterwalden against the Holy Roman Empire in 1291
Syria	17 April		Evacuation Day, end of French colonial rule in 1946
São Tomé and Príncipe	12 July		Independence from Portugal in 1975
Taiwan (China)	1 January	Founding Day	It commemorates the establishment of the Provisional Government in 1912.
Taiwan (China)	10 October	National Day	It commemorates the Wuchang Uprising that led to abolishment of the monarchy and founding of the Republic in China in 1911.
Tajikistan	9 September		Independence Day, declaration of independence from the Soviet Union in 1991
Tanzania	9 December		Independence Day, independence from British rule in 1961
Tatarstan (Russia)	30 August		Declaration of independence from the RSFSR in 1990
Thailand	5 December	National Day	Birthday of Late King Bhumibol Adulyadej in 1927. Commonly celebrated as National Day and Father's Day.
Timor-Leste	20 May	Independence Day	Independence from Indonesia in 2002
Togo	27 April		Independence from the French-administered UN trusteeship in 1960
Tonga	4 June		Emancipation Day abolition of serfdom 1862; independence from the United Kingdom in 1970
Tonga	4 November		Promulgation of the constitution in 1875
Transnistria	2 September		Independence Day, declaration of independence from Moldova in 1990
Trinidad and Tobago	31 August		Independence Day, independence from the United Kingdom in 1962
Tristan da Cunha (United Kingdom)	3rd Saturday in June		King's Official Birthday
Tunisia	20 March		Declaration of independence from France in 1956
Turkey	29 October		Republic Day (Cumhuriyet Bayramı), adoption of a republican constitution in 1923
Turkmenistan	27 September		Independence Day, declaration of independence from the Soviet Union in 1991
Turks and Caicos Islands (United Kingdom)	30 August		Constitution Day, adoption of a constitution in 1976
Tuvalu	1 October		Tuvalu Day, independence from the Gilbert Islands (Kiribati) in 1975 and from the United Kingdom in 1978
Uganda	9 October		Independence from the United Kingdom in 1962
Ukraine	15 July		Statehood Day, commemoration of the Christianization of Kievan Rus'
Ukraine	24 August		Independence from the Soviet Union in 1991. See Independence Day of Ukraine
United Arab Emirates	2 December		National Day, formation of the federation of seven emirates on independence from the United Kingdom in 1971
United Kingdom	3rd Saturday in June (unofficial)	King's Official Birthday	Does not have a recognized national day (see proposed British National Day), although the King's Official Birthday (King Charles III's was announced as being the third Saturday in June) is sometimes considered as such, for example, in British diplomatic institutions overseas
United Nations	24 October	United Nations Day	An annual commemorative day, reflecting the official creation of the United Nations on 24 October 1945
United States	4 July	Independence Day	First 13 states declare independence from the Kingdom of Great Britain in 1776.
United States Virgin Islands (United States)	31 March		Transfer Day, transfer of the islands from Denmark to the United States in 1917
Uruguay	25 August	Independence Day	Declaration of independence from Brazil in 1825
Uzbekistan	1 September	Independence Day	Declaration of independence from the Soviet Union in 1991
Valencian Community (Spain)	9 October		Anniversary of the creation of the Kingdom of Valencia in 1238
Vanuatu	30 July		Independence Day, independence from the United Kingdom and France in 1980
Vatican City	11 February	Lateran Treaty Day	Foundation of Vatican City, signing of the Lateran Treaty in 1929
Venezuela	5 July	Independence Day	Declaration of independence from Spain in 1811
Vietnam	2 September	National Day	National Day, declaration of independence from France and Japan in 1945
Wales (United Kingdom)	1 March	Saint David's Day	Feast day of Saint David, patron saint of Wales
Wallonia (Belgium)	3rd Sunday of September		Day of the Walloon Region
Yemen	22 May		Unity Day, North and South Yemen are unified as the Republic of Yemen in 1990
Yugoslavia	29 November		Day of the Republic, celebrating the anniversary of the second session of AVNOJ, paving way for the establishment of the second Yugoslav state
Zambia	24 October		Independence Day, declaration of independence from the United Kingdom in 1964
Zimbabwe	18 April		Granting of independence by the United Kingdom in 1980; it had previously declared independence as Rhodesia on 11 November 1965

== Gallery ==
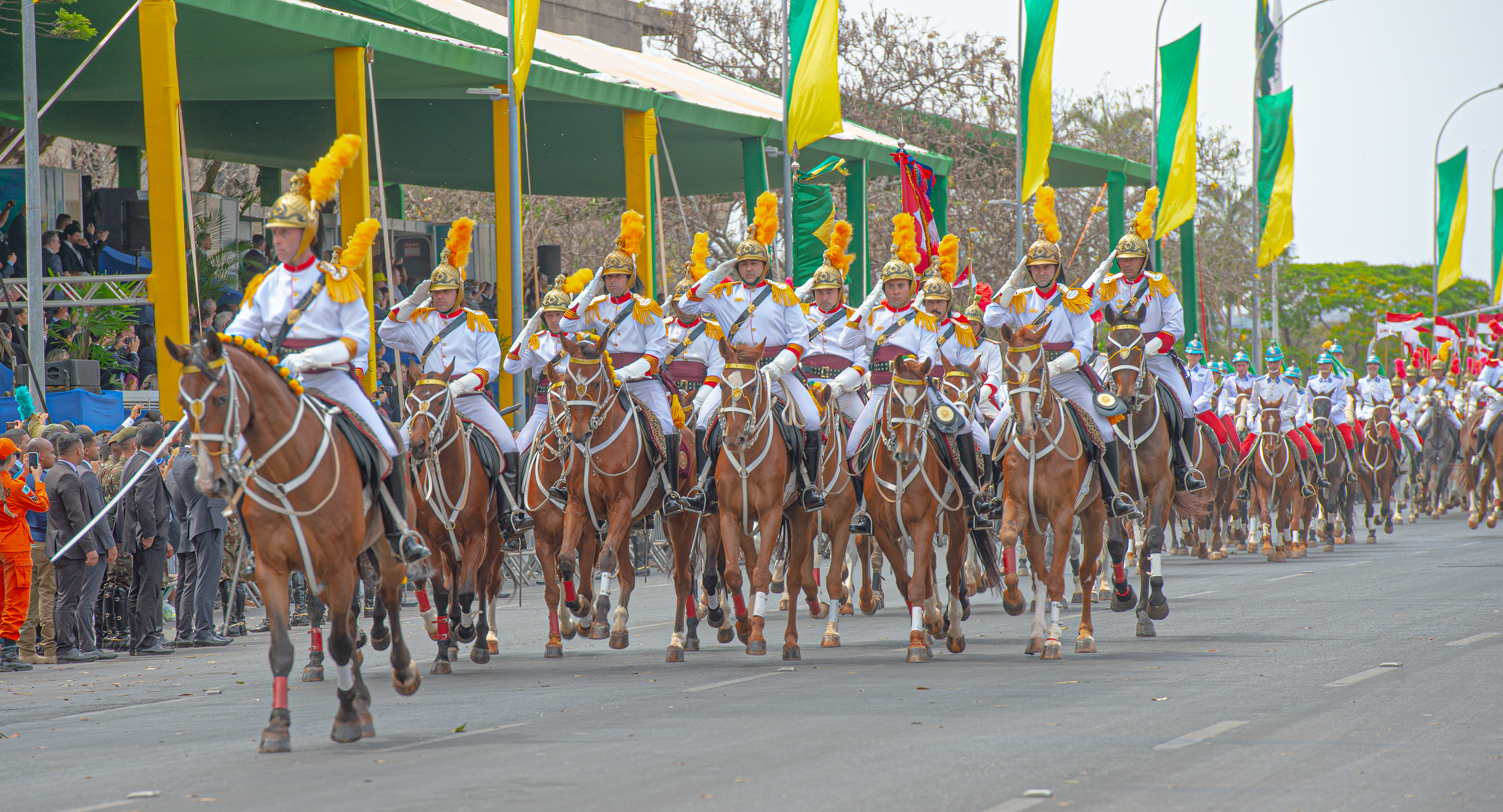
Independence Day in Brazil

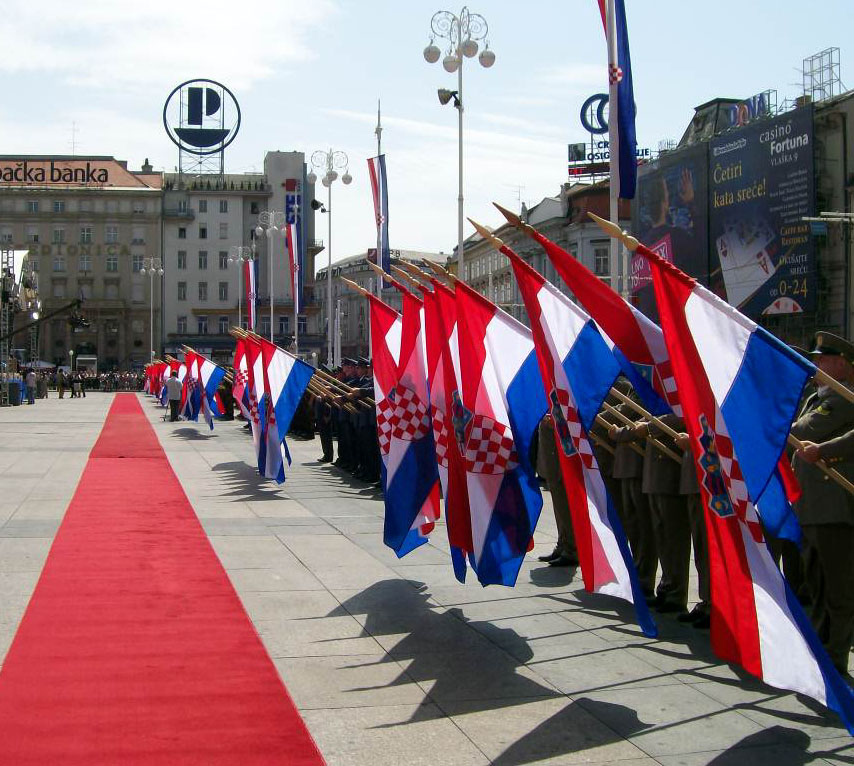
Statehood Day in Croatia

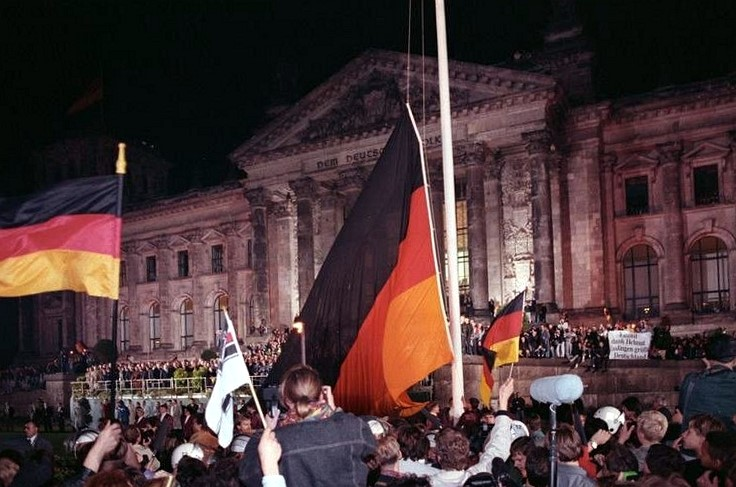
German Unity Day

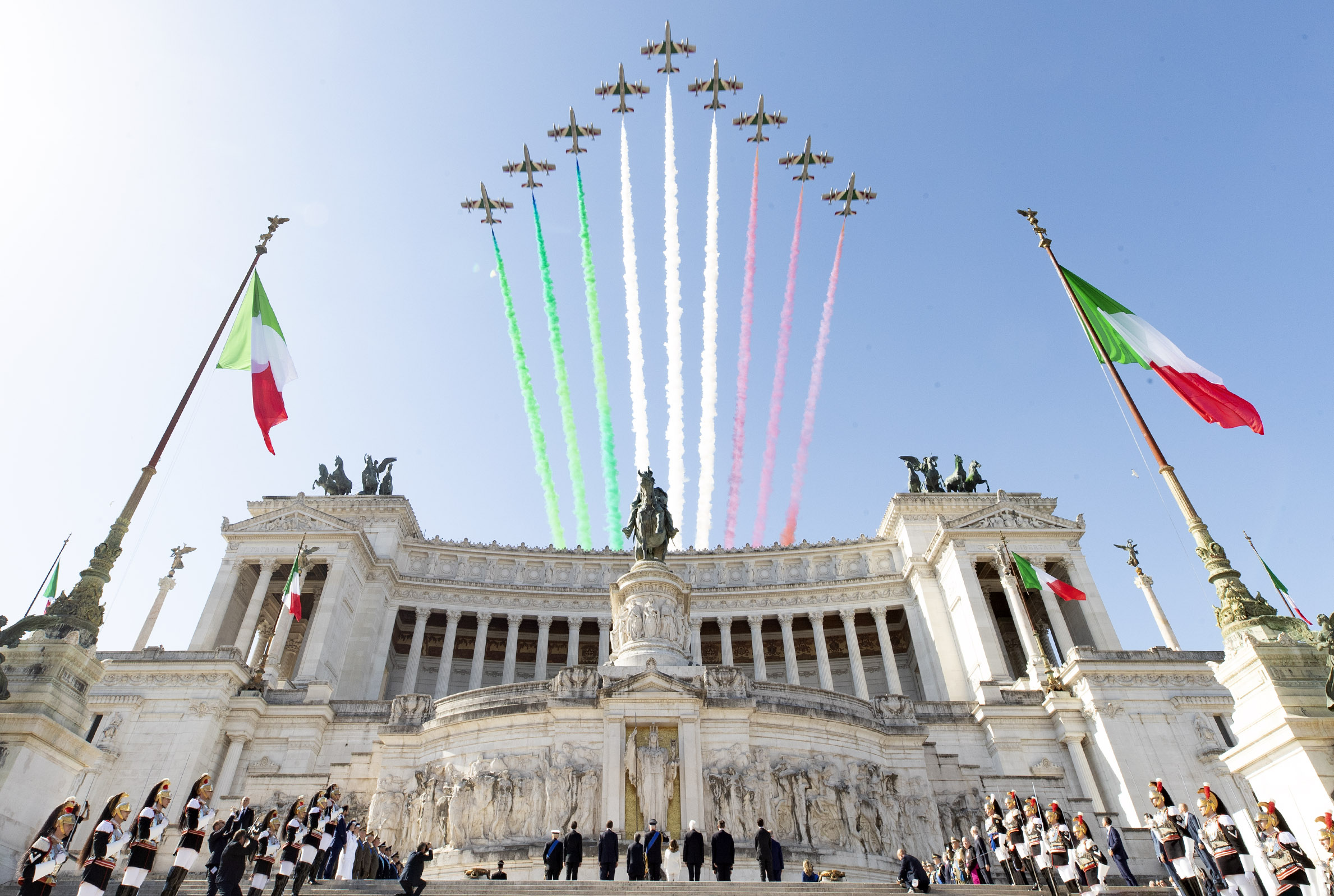
Republic Day in Italy

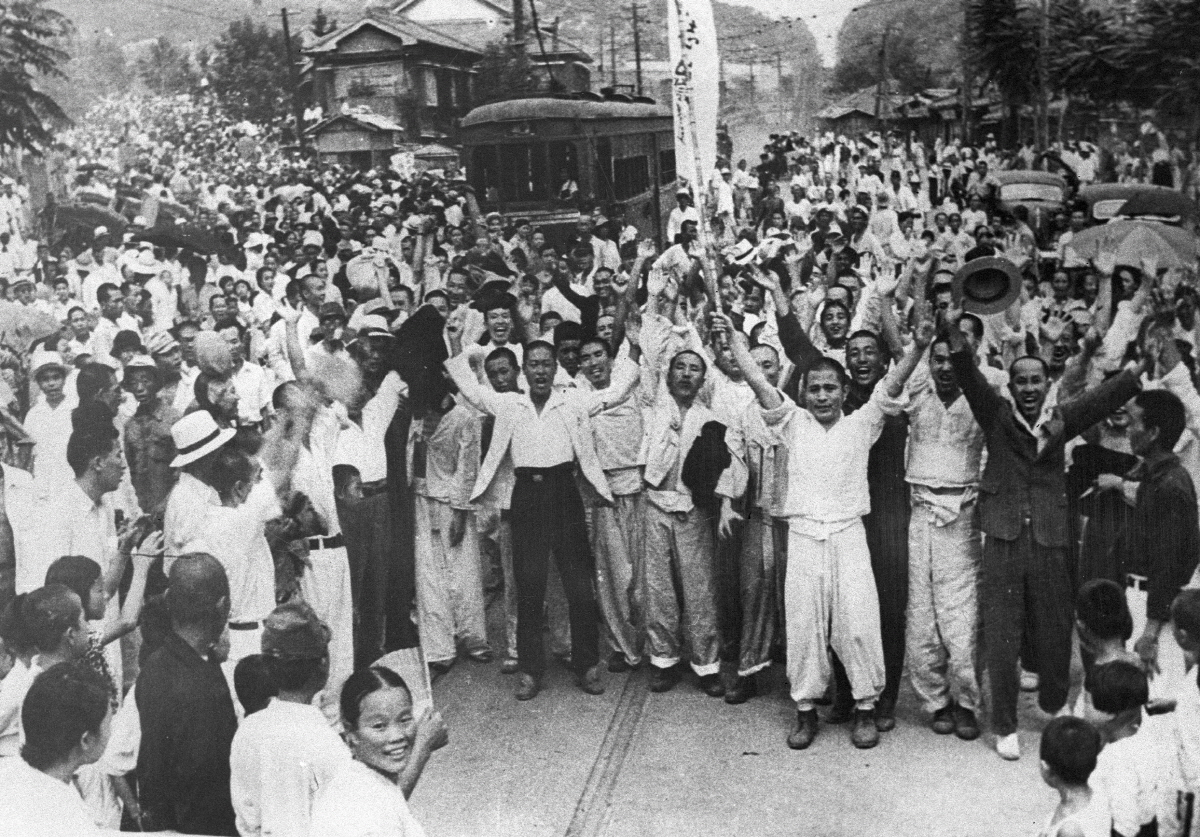
National Liberation Day of Korea

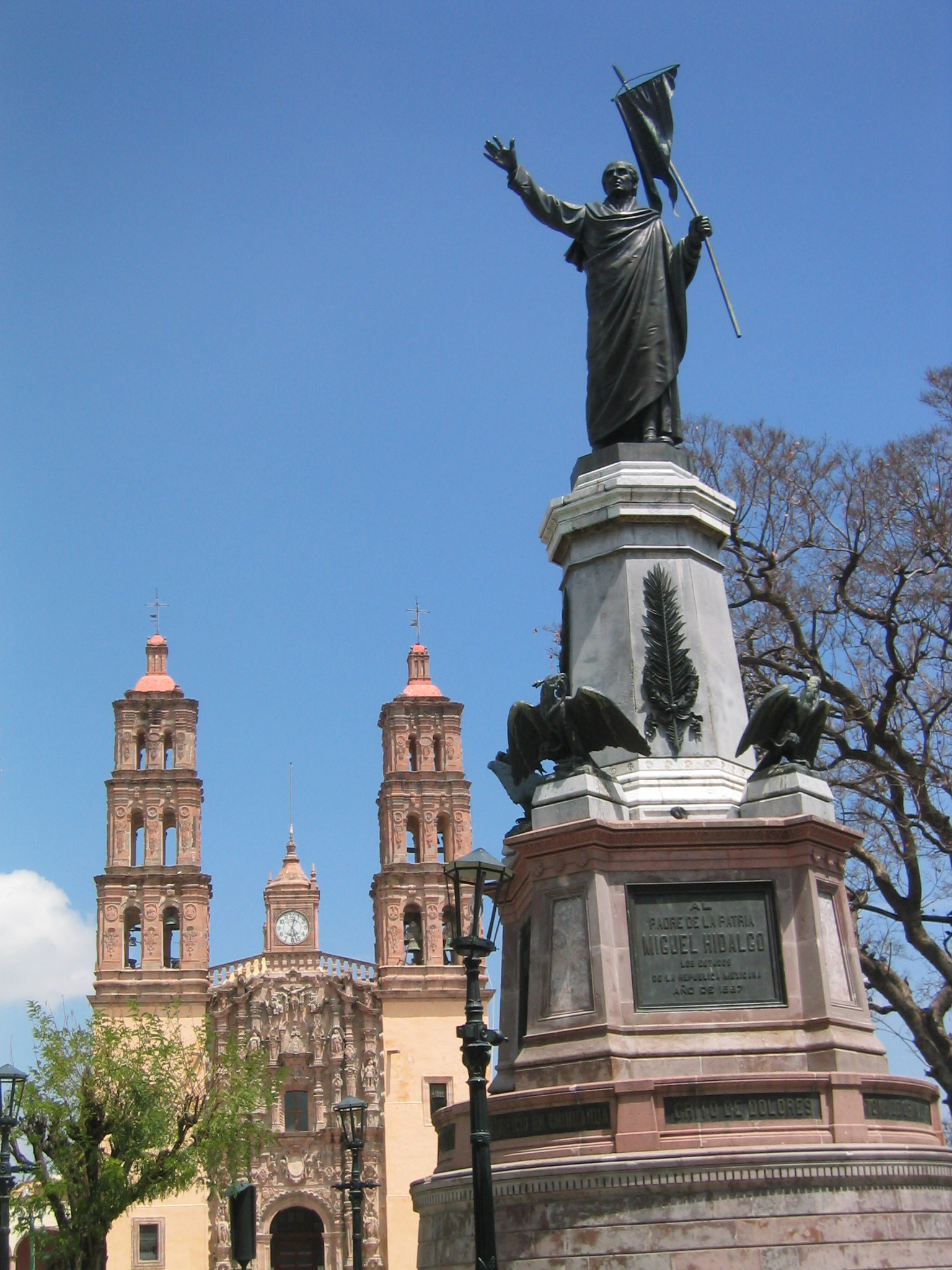
Independence Day in Mexico

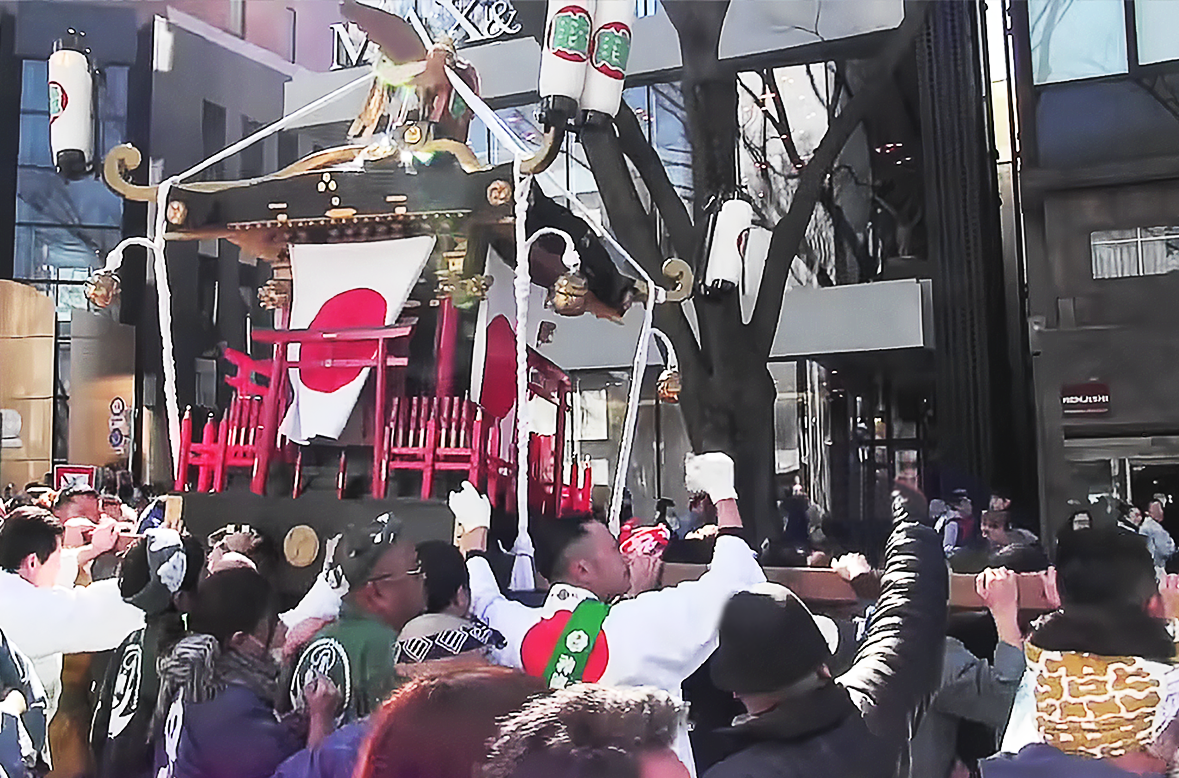
National Foundation Day in Japan

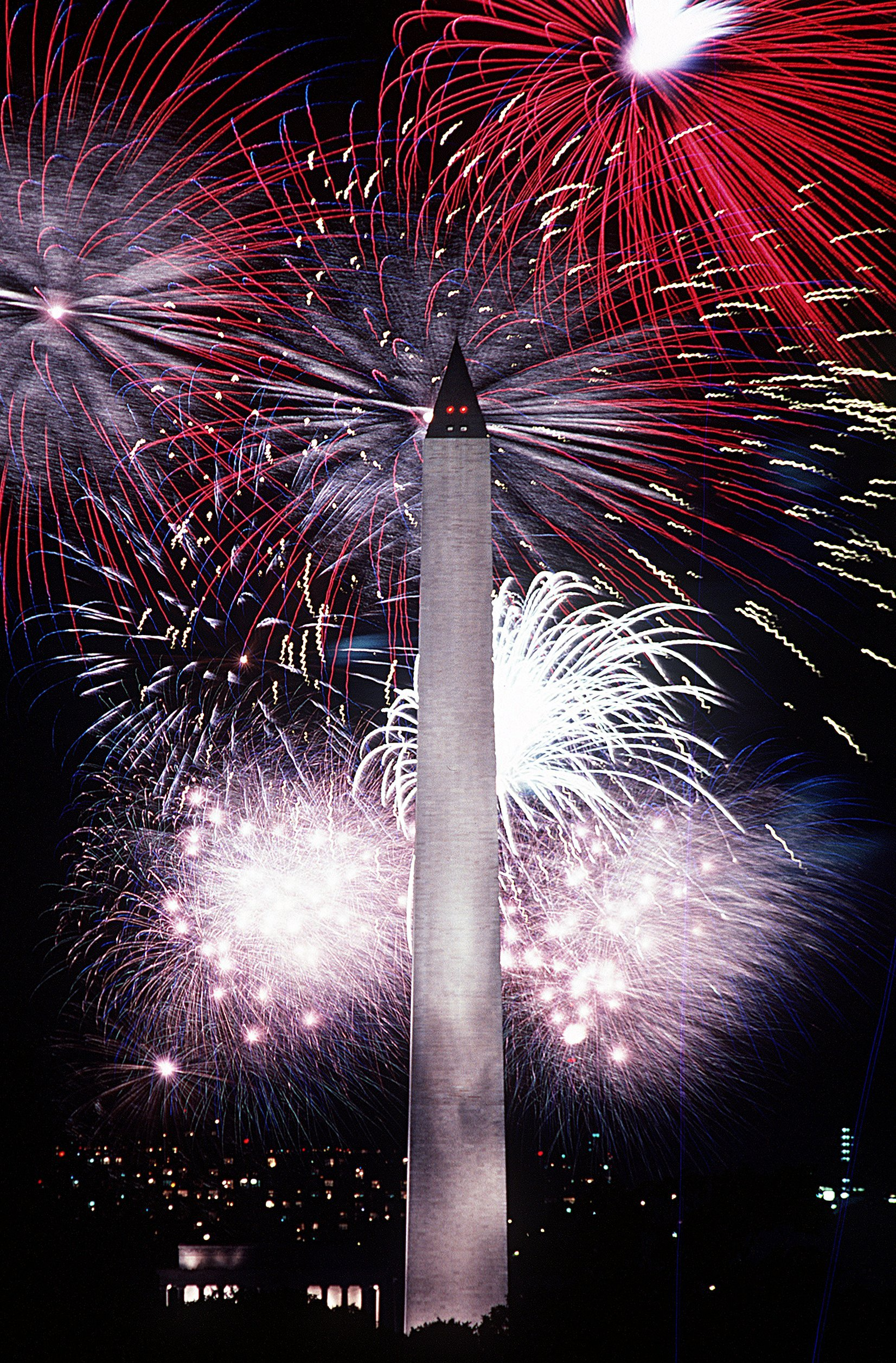
Independence Day of United States

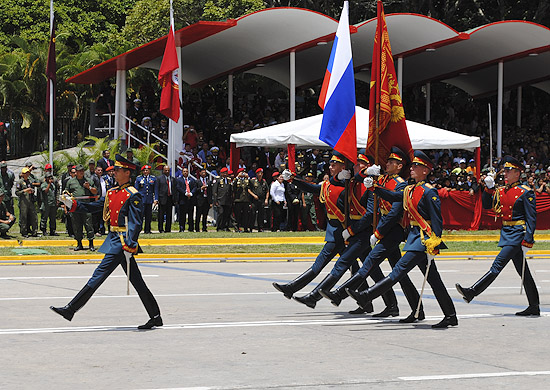
Independence Day in Venezuela

== See also ==
- Public holiday
- Flag Day
- Independence Day
- Liberation Day
- Civil religion
- Fête nationale
- Republic Day
- Victory Day
