= Public holidays in Belgium =

In Belgium, there are ten official public holidays. Other particular days are also celebrated, but these are not official public holidays and employers are not obliged to give their employees a day off. However, some employers do award a day's holiday in accordance with union.

== Public holidays ==
Date	Name			
Date	English	Dutch	French	German
1 January (fixed)	New Year's Day	Nieuwjaar	Nouvel An	Neujahr
23 March – 26 April (floating Monday using Computus)	Easter Monday	Paasmaandag	Lundi de Pâques	Ostermontag
1 May (fixed)	Labour Day	Dag van de arbeid	Fête du Travail	Tag der Arbeit
40 days after Easter (floating Thursday)	Ascension Day	Hemelvaart	Ascension	Christi Himmelfahrt
50 days after Easter (floating Monday)	Whit Monday	Pinkstermaandag	Lundi de Pentecôte	Pfingstmontag
21 July (fixed)	National Day	Nationale Feestdag	Fête Nationale	Nationalfeiertag
15 August (fixed)	Assumption Day	Onze Lieve Vrouw Hemelvaart	Assomption	Mariä Himmelfahrt
1 November (fixed)	All Saints' Day	Allerheiligen	Toussaint	Allerheiligen
11 November (fixed)	Armistice Day	Wapenstilstand	Jour de l'Armistice	Waffenstillstand
25 December (fixed)	Christmas Day	Kerstmis	Noël	Weihnachten

In addition to the above, the same legal text names all Sundays as public holidays (which is why Easter and Pentecost, which always fall on Sundays, are "feasted" by extending the Sunday holiday to the following Monday).

== Particular days celebrated in Belgium that are not official public holidays ==
Holiday	Date	Location	Dutch	French	German
Epiphany	6 January	National	Driekoningen	Épiphanie	Erscheinung des Herrn
Valentine's Day	14 February	National	Valentijnsdag	Saint-Valentin	Valentinstag
Veterans Day	7 April	National	Veteranendag	Journée des Vétérans	Veteranentag
Iris Festival	8 May	Brussels-Capital Region	Irisfeest	Fête de l'Iris	Iris-Festival
Day of the Flemish Community	11 July	Flemish Community	Feest van de Vlaamse Gemeenschap	Fête de la Communauté flamande	Feiertag der Flämischen Gemeinschaft
Meyboom	9 August	Brussels-Capital Region	Meyboom	Meyboom	Meyboom
French Community Holiday	27 September	French Community	Dag van de Franse Gemeenschap	Fête de la Communauté française	Feiertag der Französischen Gemeinschaft
Day of the Walloon Region	third Sunday of September	Wallonia	Feest van het Waalse Gewest	Fête de la Région wallonne	Festtag der Wallonischen Region
Halloween	31 October	National	Halloween	Halloween	Halloween
All Souls' Day	2 November	National	Allerzielen	Jour des morts	Allerseelen
Saint Martin's Day	11 November	Ostbelgien, parts of Flanders	Sint-Maarten	Saint-Martin	Sankt Martin
Day of the German-speaking Community	15 November	Ostbelgien	Dag van de Duitstalige Gemeenschap	Fête de la Communauté germanophone	Tag der Deutschsprachigen Gemeinschaft
King's Feast	15 November	National	Koningsdag	Fête du Roi	Festtag des Königs
Saint Verhaegen	20 November	Brussels-Capital Region	Sint-Verhaegen	Saint-Verhaegen	Sankt Verhaegen
Saint Nicholas Day	6 December	National	Sinterklaas	Saint-Nicolas	Sankt Nikolaus
Second Day of Christmas	26 December	National	Tweede kerstdag	Lendemain de Noël	2. Weihnachtstag

The days of the three communities are holidays for their civil servants and for employees of institutions controlled, supervised or financed by them (e.g. municipalities, universities) and may also be observed by banks in the community concerned. King's Feast is a holiday observed by all (i.e. federal, community or regional, provincial and local) administrations, including some of the schools they organize.

== See also ==
- Public holidays in the Netherlands
- Public holidays in France
- Public holidays in the European Union
