= National holiday =

National holiday may refer to:

- General strike, a mass work stoppage as part of an industrial dispute
- National day, a day when a nation celebrates a very important event in its history, such as its establishment
- Public holiday, a holiday established by law, usually a day off for at least a portion of the workforce, such as public-sector employees

== See also ==
- Fête nationale
