= Fête nationale =

Fête nationale is a French term meaning national day or national celebration, typically a public holiday in French-speaking countries.

It may refer to:

- Bastille Day (July 14) in France, Fête nationale française
- Grand Duke's Official Birthday (June 23) in Luxembourg, Fête nationale luxembourgeoise
- Saint-Jean-Baptiste Day (June 24) in Quebec, Fête nationale du Québec
- Canada Day (July 1) in Canada, Fête du Canada and Fête nationale du Canada
- Belgian National Day (July 21) in Belgium, Fête nationale belge
- Swiss National Day (August 1) in Switzerland, Fête nationale suisse
