= Liberation Day (Channel Islands) =

Public holiday in Jersey and Guernsey

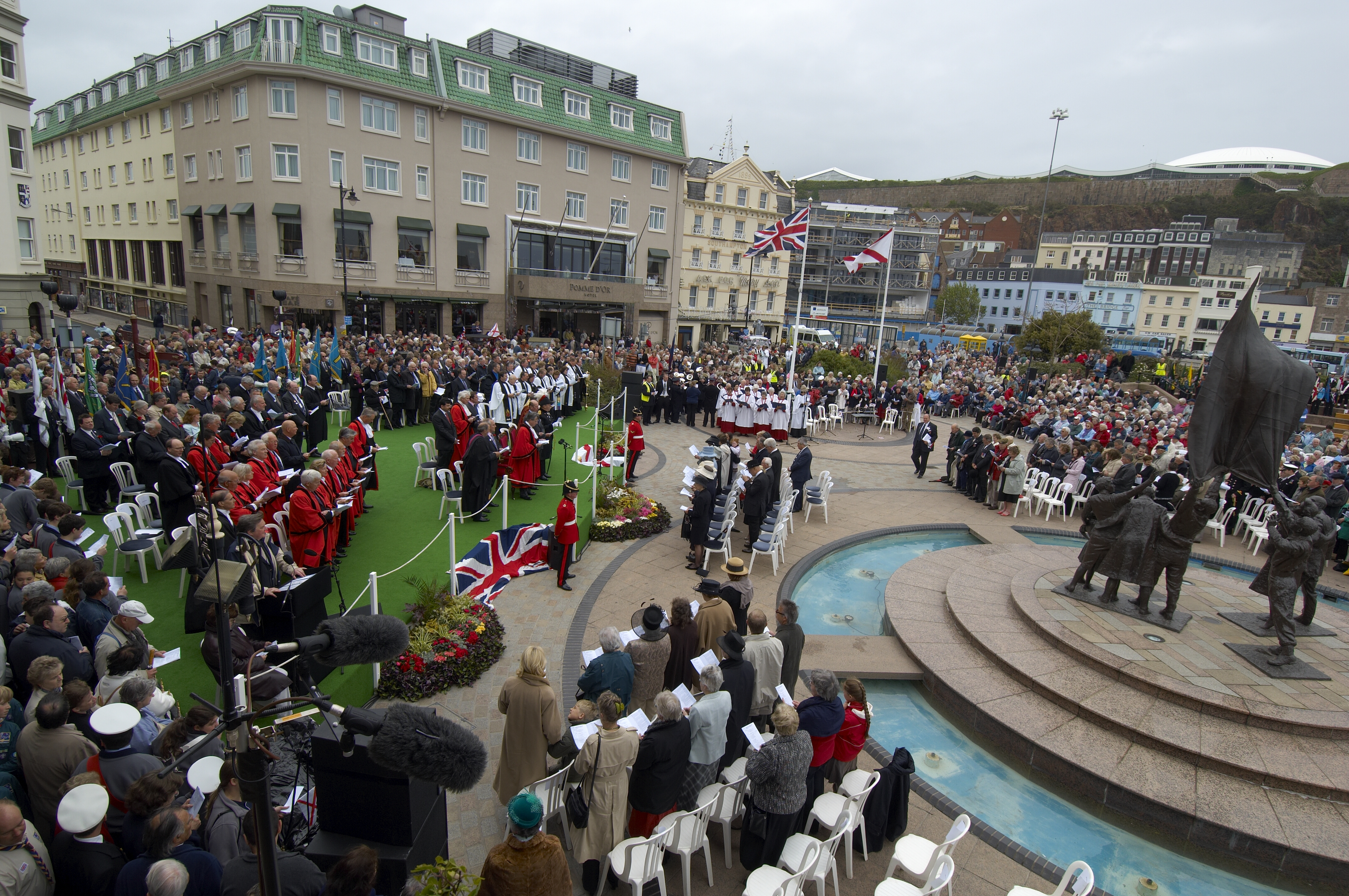
- Liberation Day in Jersey, 2007
- Official name: English: Liberation Day; Jèrriais: Jour d'la Libéthâtion; Guernésiais: Jour dé la Libératiaon
- Observed by: Guernsey, Jersey
- Type: National Day
- Date: 9 May
- Frequency: Annual
- Related to: German occupation of the Channel Islands during World War II

Liberation Day (Jèrriais: Jour d'la Libéthâtion; Guernésiais: Lé Jour dé la Libératiaon) is the national day of both Guernsey and Jersey, the two largest of the Channel Islands, which takes place on 9 May each year. It commemorates the liberation of the Channel Islands on 9 May 1945, which marked the end of the islands' occupation by Nazi Germany during World War II. It falls on the same day as the European Union's Europe Day, which celebrates post-World War II peace and European unity. 9 May is a public holiday in both islands and each has different celebrations and commemorative events; the centrepiece of Jersey's is the Liberation Day re-enactment in the Liberation Square, while Guernsey's is an islandwide cavalcade of classic vehicles.

== History ==
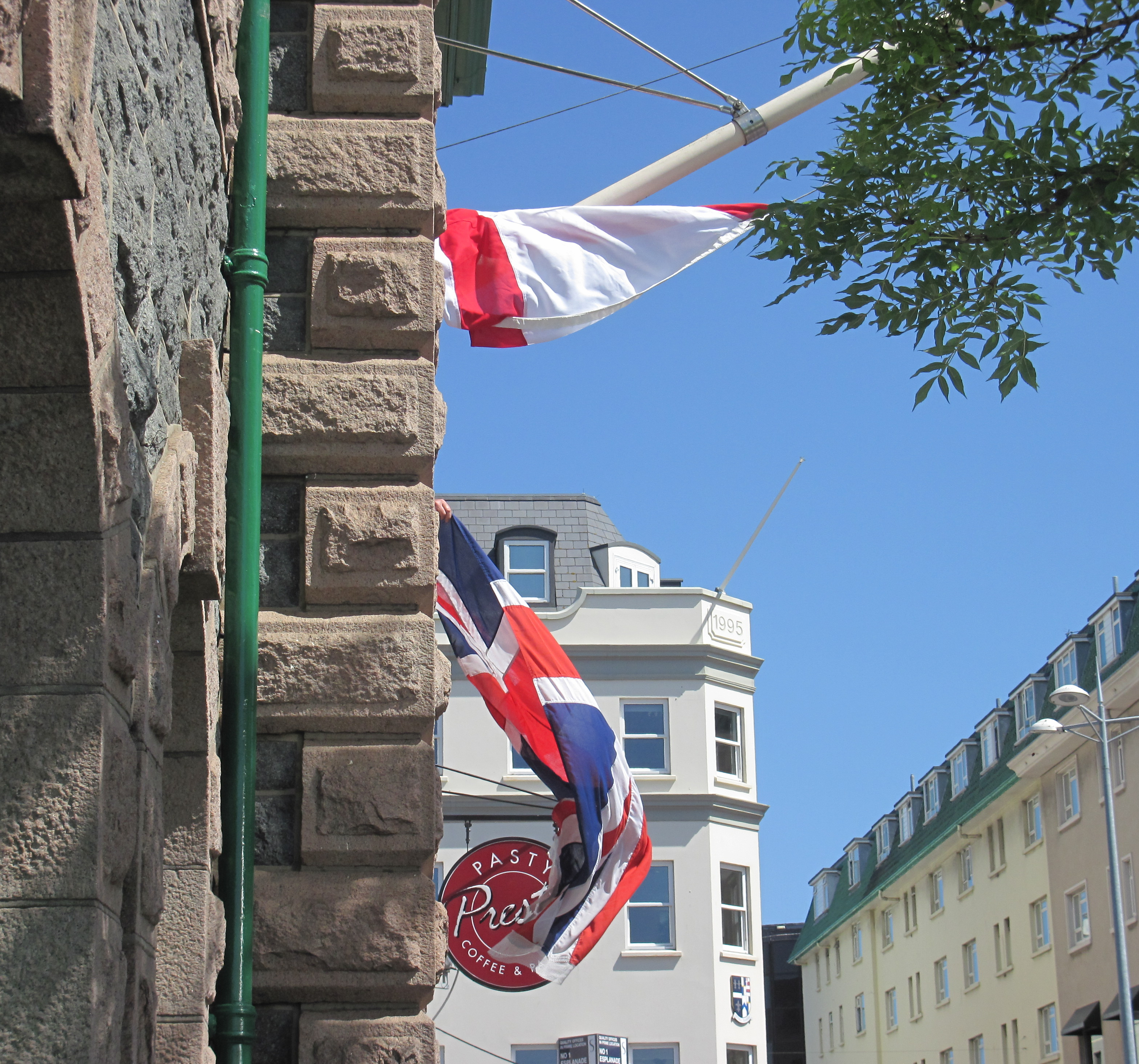
Re-enacting the raising of flags on Liberation Day 2011

On 9 May 1945, HMS Bulldog arrived in St Peter Port, Guernsey, and the German forces surrendered unconditionally aboard the vessel at dawn. British forces landed in St Peter Port shortly afterwards and were greeted by crowds of joyous but malnourished islanders singing, amongst other patriotic songs, "Sarnia-Cherie".

The same day, HMS Beagle, which had set out from Plymouth, arrived in Jersey to accept the surrender of the occupying forces there. Two naval officers, Surgeon Lieutenant Ronald McDonald and Sub Lieutenant R. Milne, were met by the harbour master who escorted them to his office where they together hoisted the Union Flag before also raising it on the flagstaff of the Pomme d'Or Hotel. This has been re-enacted every year on Liberation Day since 1995. From 2003 to 2011, former harbour master and Jerseyman captain Howard Le Cornu performed this annually. His father, John E. Le Cornu, and uncle, David M. Le Cornu, had been in the crowds and had witnessed the occasion on 9 May 1945.

Sark was liberated on 10 May 1945 and the German troops in Alderney surrendered on 16 May 1945.

== Official status ==
The Public Holidays and Bank Holidays (Jersey) Act 1952 established Liberation Day as a public holiday if it fell on a weekday. The Public Holidays and Bank Holidays (Jersey) Act 2010 further laid down that Liberation was also to be a public holiday if it falls on a Saturday. It is not a public holiday, and no day off in lieu is provided if it falls on a Sunday.

Liberation Day is also a public holiday in Guernsey, according to the Public Holidays Ordinance 1994. Unlike Jersey's, Guernsey employment law provides no statutory entitlement to public holidays.

== Ceremonies ==
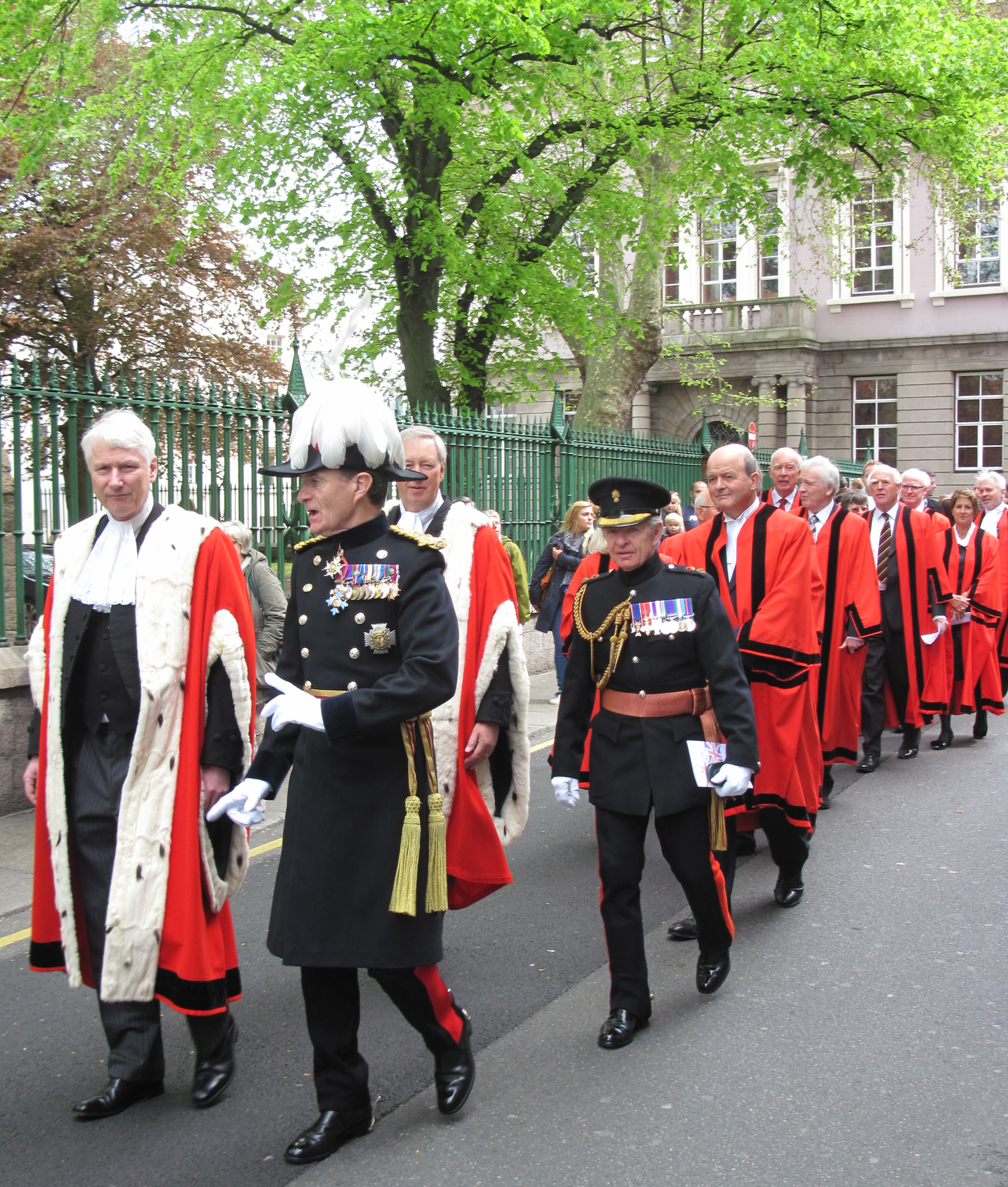
Bailiff, Lieutenant-Governor and other officials in procession on Liberation Day 2012

Since the 50th anniversary of Liberation in 1995, a pattern of official ceremonies has developed based in and around Liberation Square in Saint Helier where the events at the Harbour Master's Office and Pomme D'Or Hotel occurred in 1945. Following a special sitting of the States of Jersey in the morning, States Members, clergy, the Bailiff of Jersey, the Lieutenant-Governor, Jurats, Crown Officers and other officials process from the Royal Square to Liberation Square accompanied by the Royal Mace and the Bailiff's Seal. An open-air ecumenical service takes place in Liberation Square followed by the singing of "Man Bieau P'tit Jèrri"/"Beautiful Jersey" (in Jèrriais and English) and a re-enactment of the raising of flags (including that at Fort Regent). A parade of vintage and military vehicles, bands and service organisations is reviewed by the official party.

The afternoon community celebrations are of an informal character, including a programme of entertainments and stalls in St Helier.

An official ceremony also takes place at the Crematorium, where there is a memorial to victims and slave workers of various nationalities. Representatives of affected nationalities take part in the commemoration.

In 1995, artist Eric Snell designed the Liberation Monument in St Peter Port to commemorate Liberation Day. The needle-like monument is designed to cast a shadow on a bench where the liberation of Guernsey is described. It was unveiled on 9 May 1995 by Prince Charles while military helicopters flew past.

The celebrations to mark the 75th anniversary of the liberation could not be held in 2020 or 2021, due to the COVID-19 pandemic and were postponed until 8–10 May 2022 when Prince Edward, Earl of Wessex and Sophie, Countess of Wessex were royal guests at the celebrations in Jersey, Guernsey, Alderney and Sark; they read a message to islanders from Queen Elizabeth II.

== See also ==
- Liberation Day
- Victory in Europe Day
