= Pomme d'Or Hotel =

Hotel in Saint Helier, Jersey

- Pomme d'Or
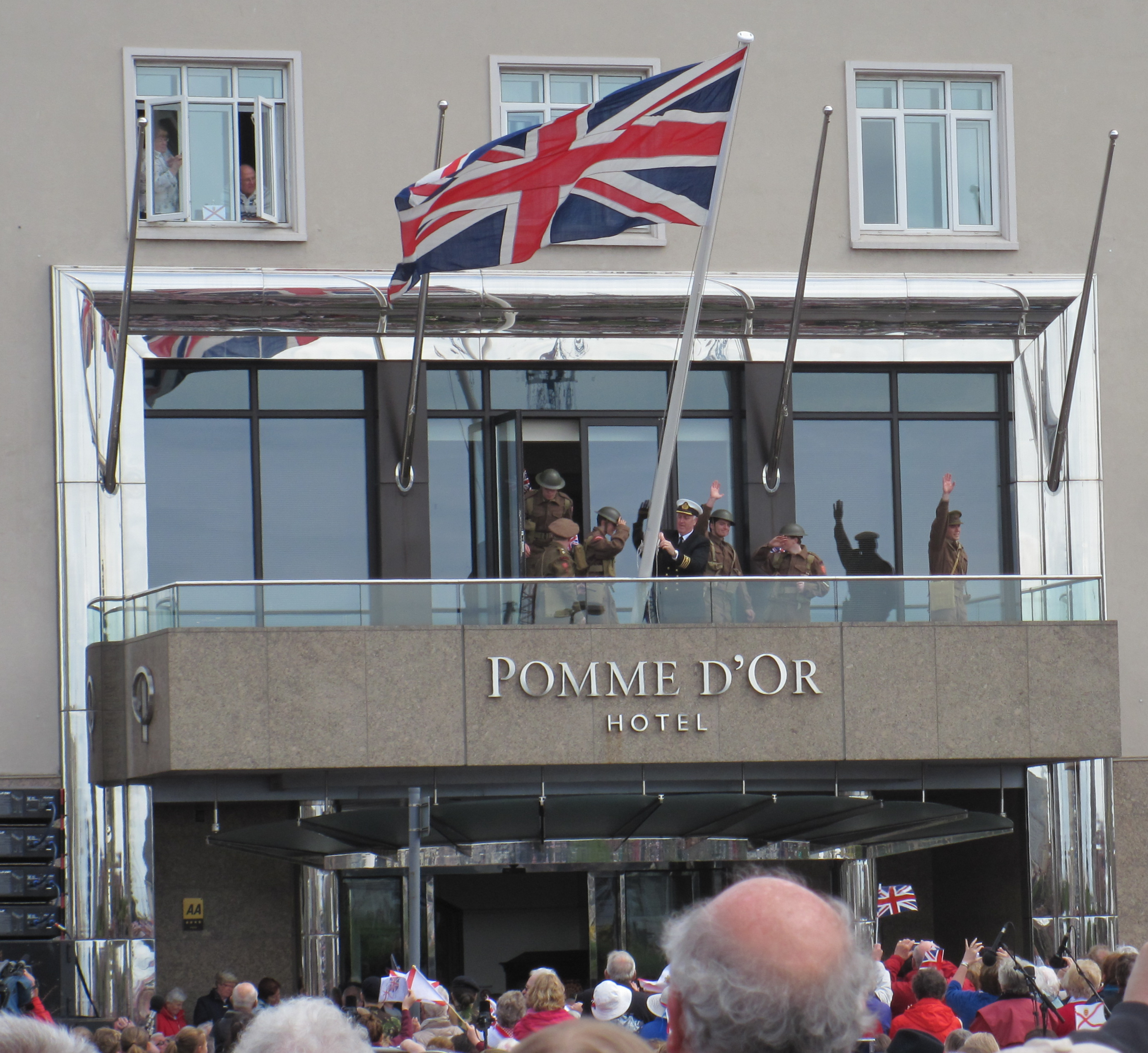
- Pomme d'Or on Liberation Day, 2012
- Interactive map of the Pomme d'Or Hotel area
- Former names: Kriegsmarine HQ

General information
- Type: Hotel
- Location: Liberation Square, St Helier, JE1 3UF, Saint Helier, Jersey
- Coordinates: 49°10′59″N 02°06′31″W
- Named for: Pomme d'Or cider
- Opened: 1837
- Renovated: 1932, 2006
- Owner: Seymour Hotels

The Pomme d'Or Hotel is a hotel in Saint Helier, Jersey. It was founded in 1837 and was used as the Nazi naval headquarters during the Nazi occupation of the Channel Islands. It is the main focus for Jersey's Liberation Day celebrations.

== Early history ==
The original site of the Pomme d'Or had been occupied since 1802, initially stables were built on it. In 1837, the owners demolished the stables and built a hotel in their place. It was named the Pomme D'Or after a local cider produced nearby. In 1852, the French author Victor Hugo stayed at the hotel during his exile from France. Following the end of the First World War, the hotel had become dilapidated until 1932 when the Seymour family bought it and renovated it.

== Occupation ==
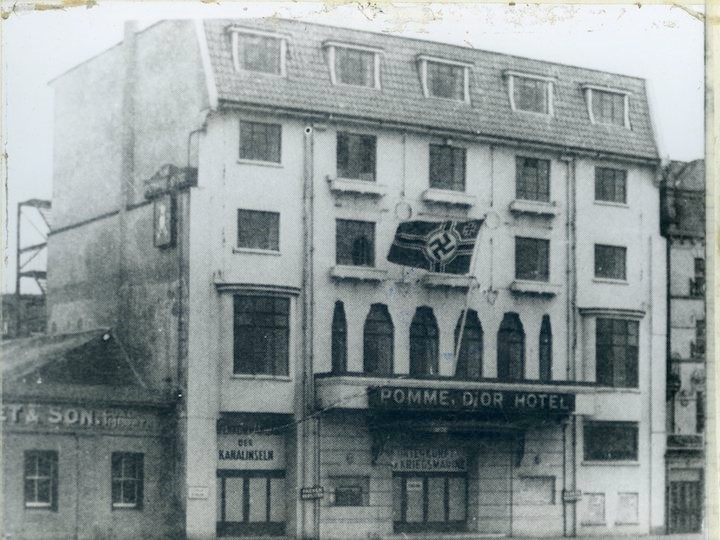
Reichskriegsflagge over the hotel in 1940

When the Germans invaded in 1940, the Pomme d'Or was requisitioned by the Nazis as the Kriegsmarine Naval Headquarters. The Reichskriegsflagge was flown from the hotel's flagpole. During the Liberation of the Channel Islands, soldiers of the British Army climbed to the balcony and removed the Nazi flag and replaced it with the Union Jack. Since then, the act of raising the Union Jack on the hotel balcony has been ceremonially repeated yearly as the focal point for Jersey's Liberation Day celebrations.

== Later history ==
In 2006, the hotel was renovated for a visit by Queen Elizabeth II. In 2012, the Pomme d'Or hosted the British–Irish Council for a discussion on the misuse of drugs in the British Isles. In 2015, Jersey moved their Liberation Day celebrations away from Liberation Square and to the People's Park, which resulted in the Pomme d'Or not hosting the traditional flag-raising ceremony that year. The celebrations and commemorative flag raising returned to the hotel the next year.
