= Flemish Community Day =

Belgian annual observance on 11 July

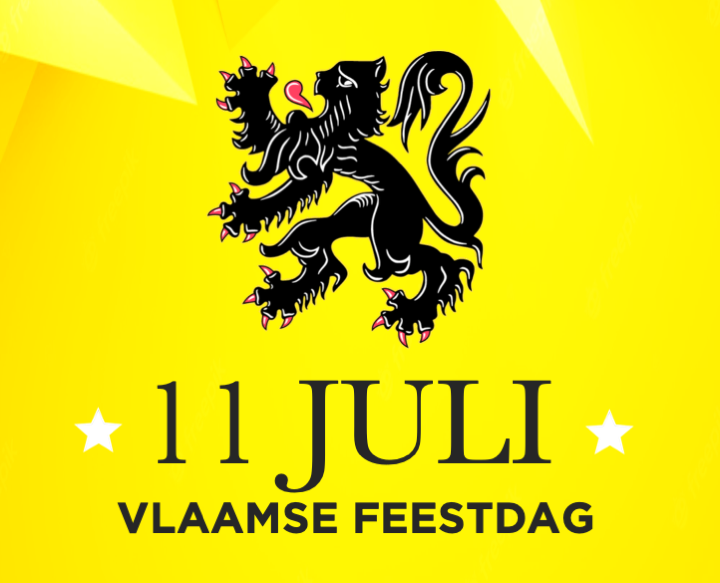
- Also called: Feestdag van Vlaanderen
- Observed by: Flemish Community, Belgium
- Date: 11 July
- Next time: 11 July 2027
- Frequency: annual
- Related to: French Community Day, Day of the German-speaking Community, King's Feast

The Flemish Community Day (Dutch: Feestdag van de Vlaamse Gemeenschap) is an annual holiday held in the Flemish Community of Belgium on 11 July. It is also variously translated as the Day of the Flemish Community, Flemish Community Holiday, Feast Day of the Flemish Community, Festival of the Flemish Community, or other variants.

This date was chosen by the Flemish Community of Belgium to mark the anniversary of the Battle of the Golden Spurs (Dutch: Guldensporenslag) in 1302.

== History ==
In 1302, the French king Philip IV sent an army to punish the Flemish citizens of Bruges, who earlier that year rebelled against the king and attacked the French governor of Flanders (the so-called Good Friday of Bruges).

The French army was composed of about 2,500 knights and squires, supported by about 5,500 infantry. The Flemish, in contrast, fielded a town militia force of 9,000 consisting mostly of infantrymen.

The two forces clashed on 11 July in an open field outside the Flemish city of Kortrijk and the battle ended with the overwhelming victory of the Flemish militia. The commander of the French army, Robert II of Artois, was surrounded and killed on the battlefield. At least a thousand French cavaliers were also killed in the battle and the large number of the golden spurs collected from the field gave the battle its name.

The battle was romanticised in 1838 by Flemish writer Hendrik Conscience in his book De Leeuw van Vlaanderen (English: The Lion of Flanders).

== Declaration ==
Following the establishment of the three cultural and linguistic communities of Belgium in 1970, the Dutch Cultural Community (as it was known then) enacted a law on 6 July 1973, which prescribes the flag, the anthem and the Flemish Community Day.

Ever since then, the Flemish Community Day is observed in Flanders. Private employers are not required to award a day's holiday; however the institutions of the Flemish Government and public employers observe this holiday.

== See also ==
- Franco-Flemish War (1297–1305)
- History of Belgium
- Public holidays in Belgium
- French-speaking Community Day
- German-speaking Community Day
