= Belgian National Day =

National holiday of Belgium

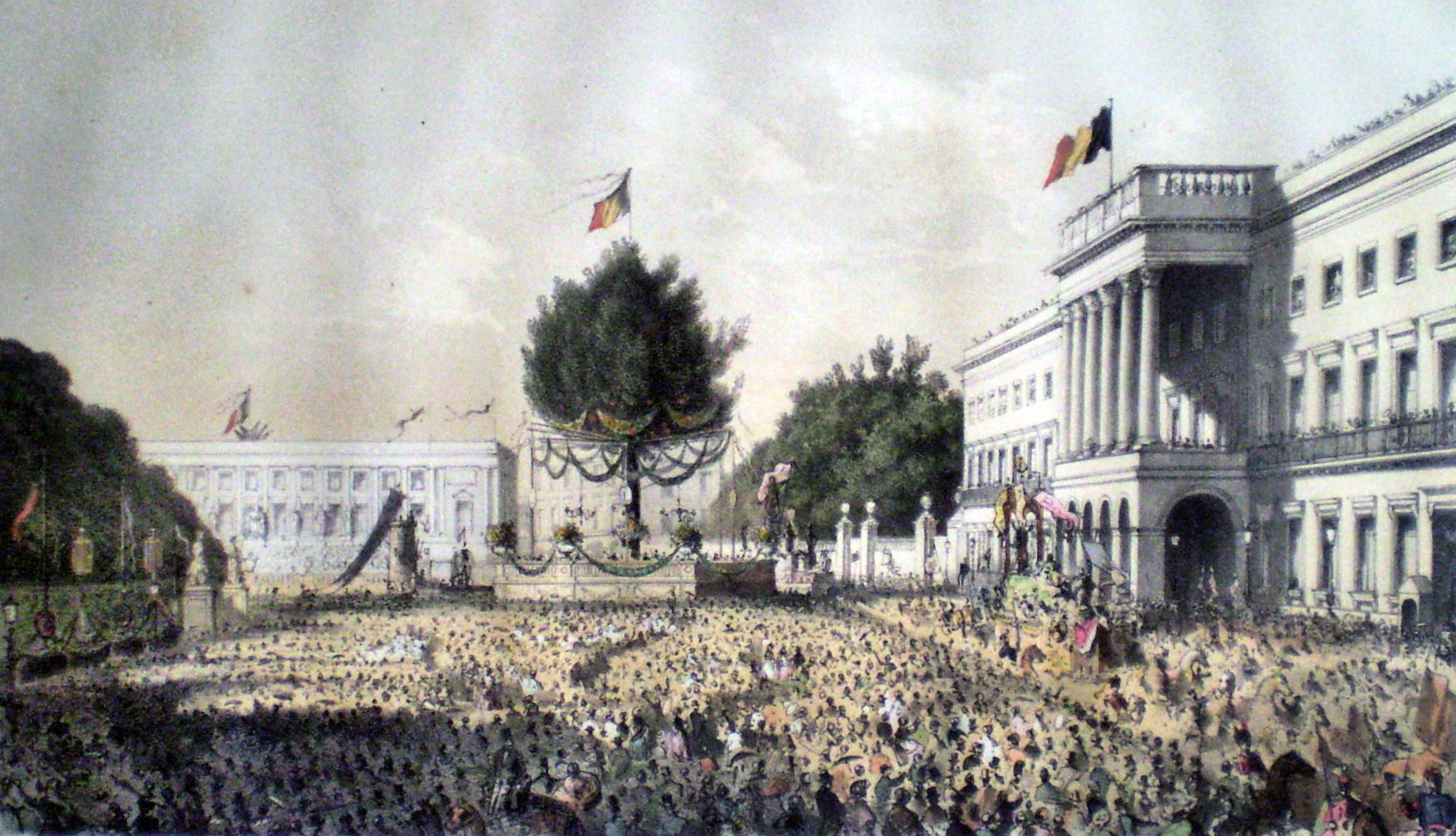
- Celebrations for National Day in Brussels in 1856
- Observed by: Belgium and Belgians
- Significance: Anniversary of King Leopold I's oath of allegiance to the Constitution and investiture as first King of the Belgians in 1831
- Date: 21 July
- Frequency: Annual
- Related to: Belgian independence; Belgian constitution and Belgian monarchy

Belgian National Day (Dutch: Nationale feestdag van België; French: Fête nationale belge; German: Belgischer Nationalfeiertag) is the national holiday of Belgium commemorated annually on 21 July. It is one of the country's ten public holidays and marks the anniversary of the investiture of Leopold I as the first King of the Belgians in 1831.

== History ==
In the aftermath of the Napoleonic Wars, Belgium became part of the United Netherlands. After a period of growing unrest, the Belgian Revolution forced Dutch forces out of the country between August and October 1830. By November, the different revolutionary factions had coalesced around the idea of national independence and began drafting a constitution for an independent Belgian state. It was decided that it would become a constitutional and popular monarchy, reflecting the romantic nationalism popular at the time. Searching for a monarch, the revolutionaries decided on Prince Leopold of Saxe-Coburg-Gotha who was a German aristocrat popular in the United Kingdom. Leopold arrived in Brussels in early July 1831 and, on 21 July, swore allegiance to the constitution, becoming the country's first monarch. 21 July 1831 is thus considered to mark the start of the modern Kingdom of Belgium.

Belgian National Day was originally celebrated on 27 September, the date of the expulsion of Dutch forces from Brussels during the Revolution's "September Days". In 1890, this was changed by law to 21 July to strengthen the association between the observance and the monarchy and constitutional order. Since 1991, 27 September has become the official observance of the French Community of Belgium. In World War I and World War II, Belgium was occupied and public displays of patriotism were banned. As a result, celebrations of 21 July became a common form of symbolic resistance.

== Programme ==
Belgian National Day is celebrated across Belgium and in Belgian emigrant communities abroad on 21 July. It is a public holiday, being one of ten observed nationally each year. Historically, National Day is marked by a televised speech by the King.

The main festivities occur in Brussels. They traditionally begin with a Te Deum at the Cathedral of St. Michael and St. Gudula, attended by the King and other dignitaries. In the afternoon, the Belgian Armed Forces and police are reviewed by the King and parade around the Rue de la Loi/Wetstraat and the perimeter of the Brussels Park in front of the Royal Palace. Foreign contingents from Belgium's European Union and NATO allies have also participated. Refreshments and displays by Belgium's public and emergency services, armed forces, charities, and civic associations are set up for the public in the park and the nearby Place Royale/Koningsplein, Rue de la Régence/Regentschapstraat and Place Poelaert/Poelaertplein. There is also a flypast by the Belgian Air Force. In the evening, there is a fireworks display. Since 2003, there has also been a concert known as the "National Ball" (bal national). In 2019, the festivities in Brussels were attended by an estimated 100,000 people.

Elsewhere in Belgium, celebrations often involve church services, flea markets, and public concerts. Belgian flags are commonly displayed in shops and private houses. Belgium's climate means that rain is common on National Day and is popularly referred to in French as the "National Downpour" (drache nationale).

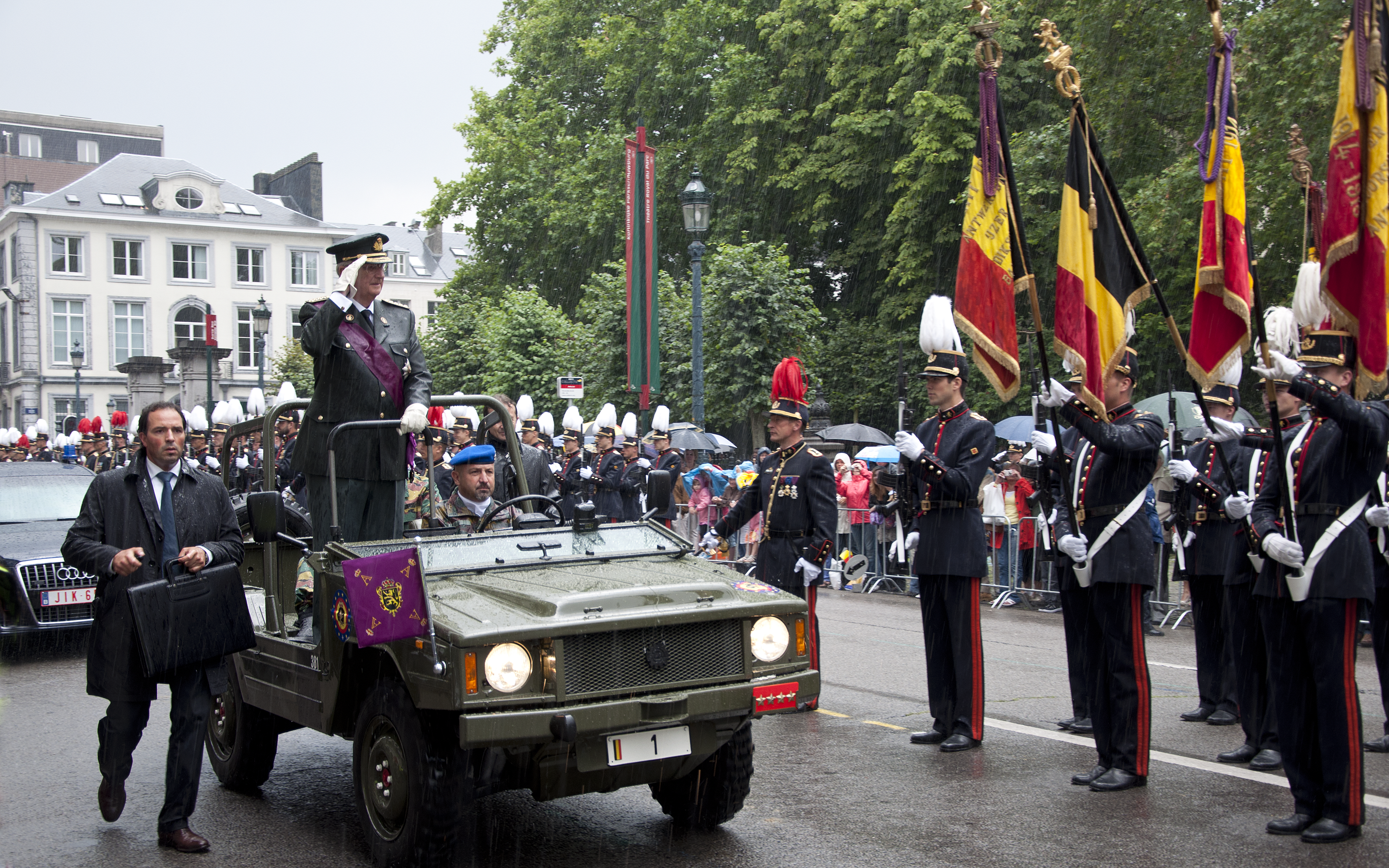
King Albert II reviews cadets of the Royal Military Academy on National Day 2011.

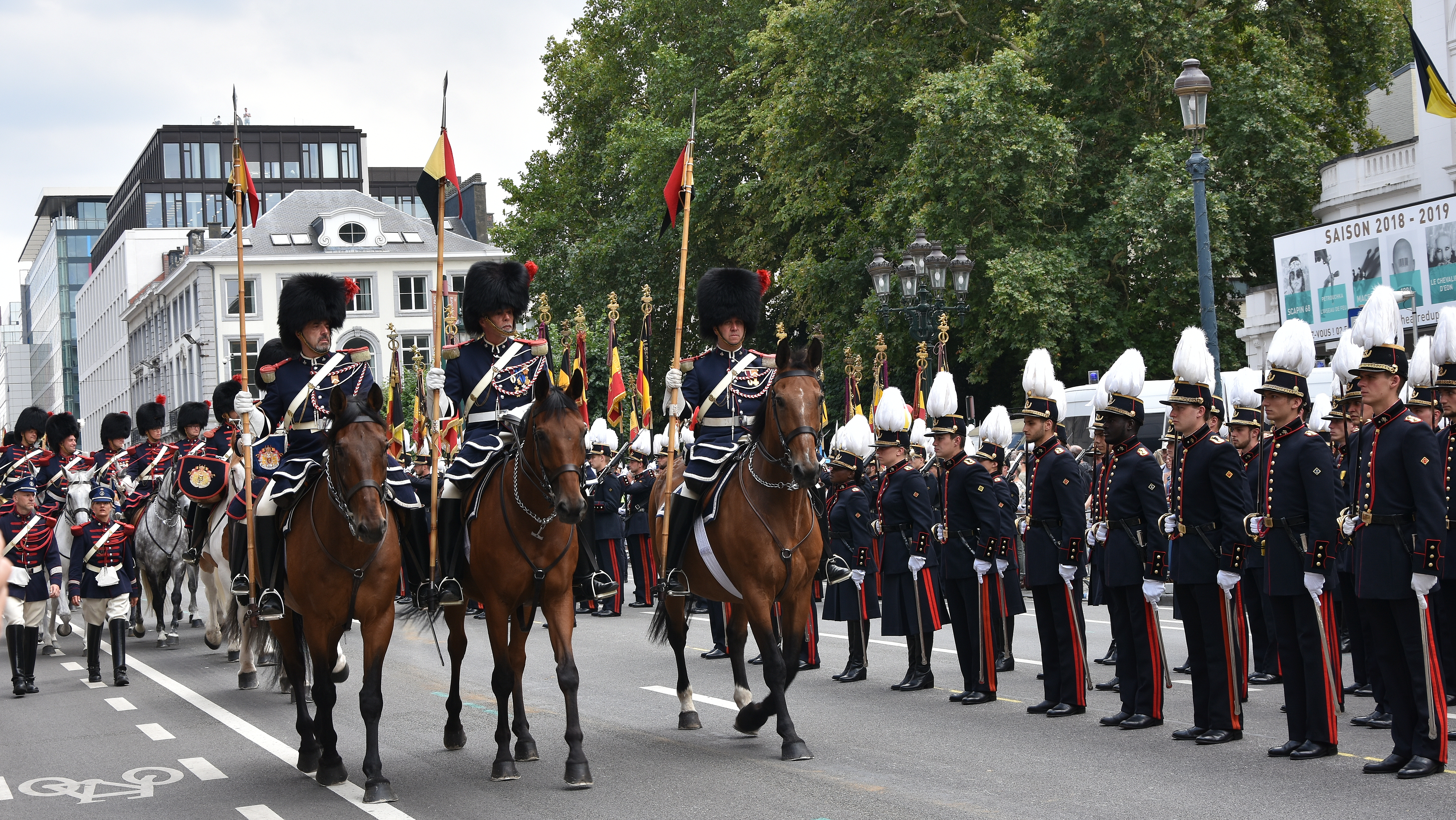
Parade by the Royal Escort on National Day 2018

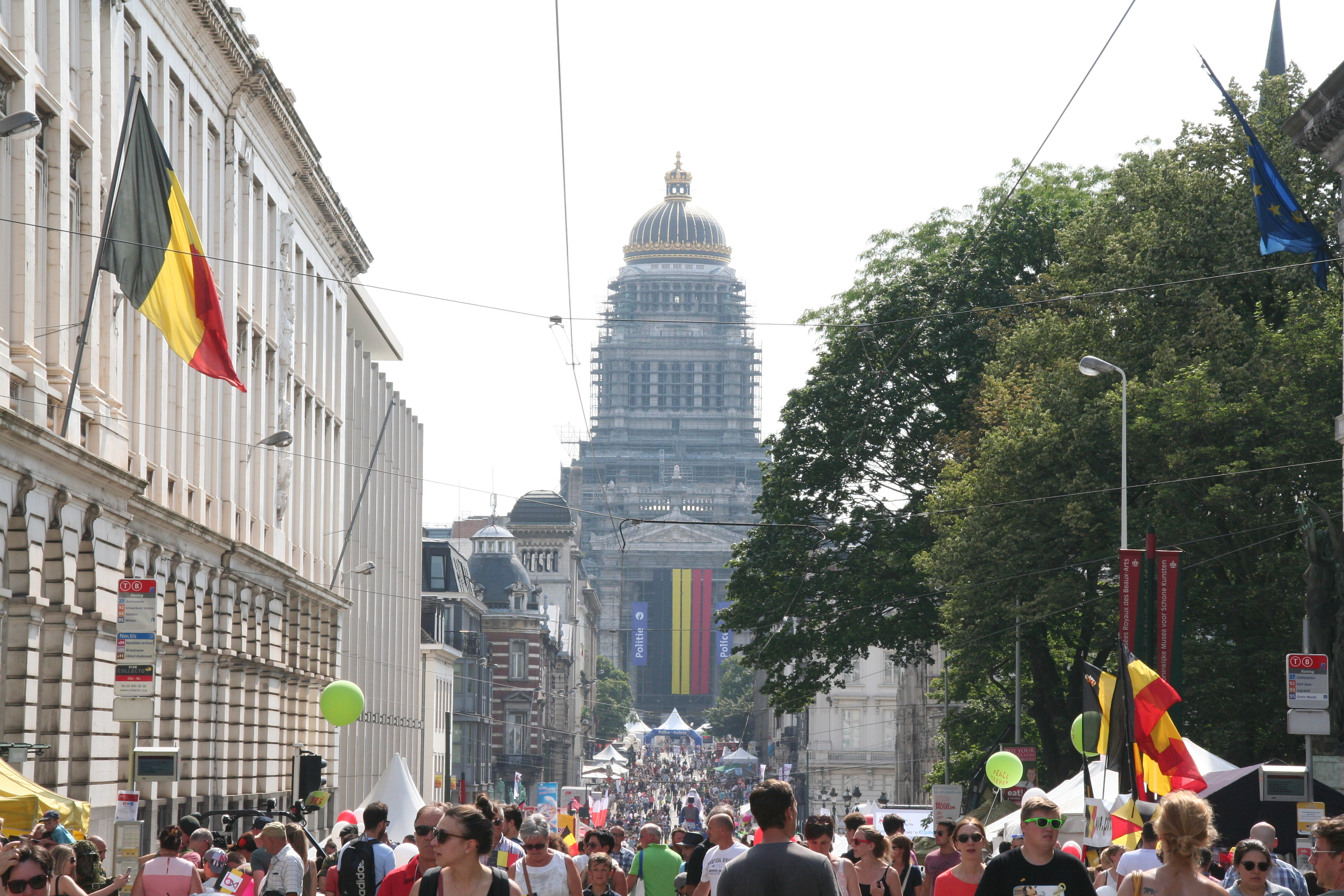
Crowds on the Rue de la Régence/Regentschapstraat on National Day 2016

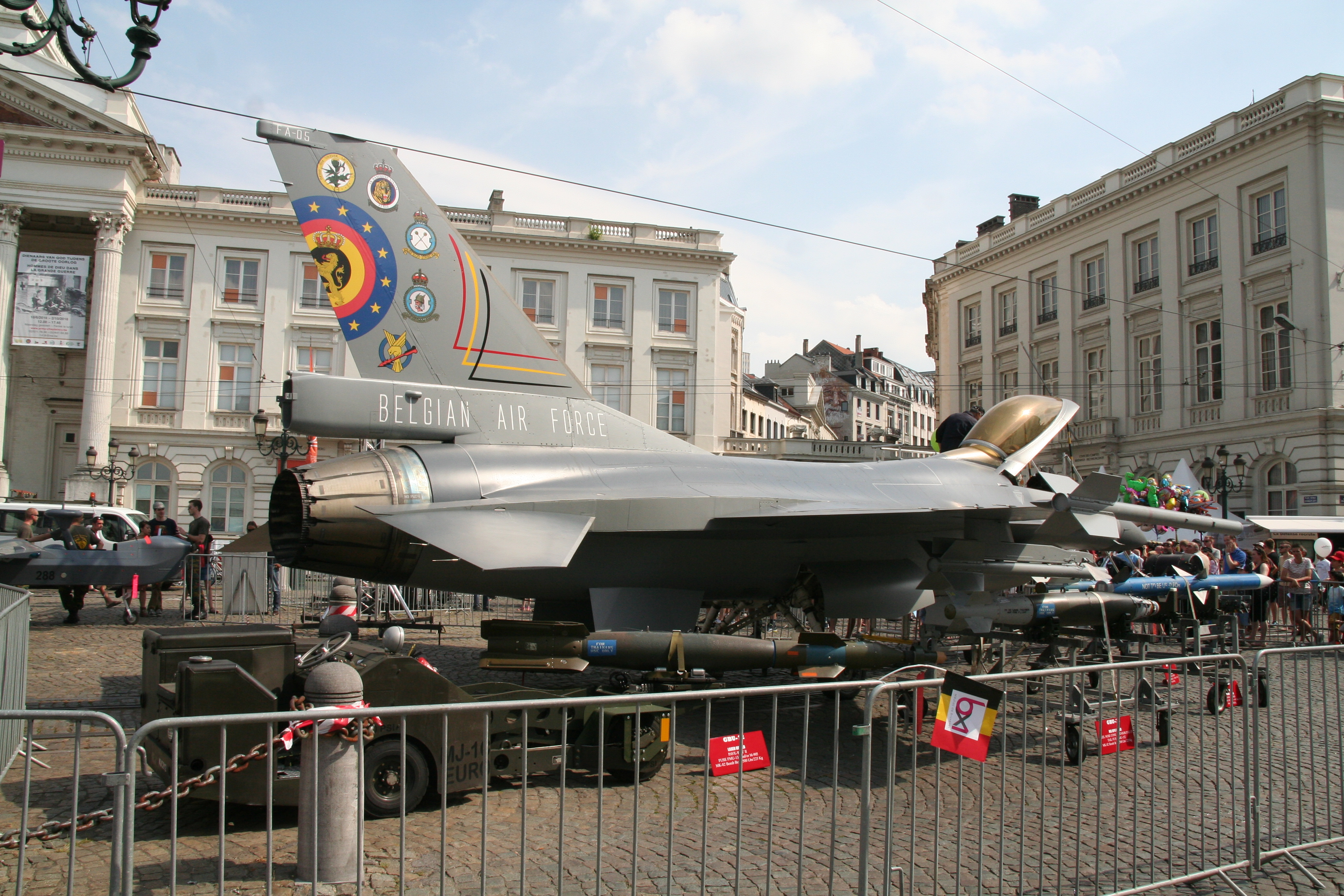
Display by the Belgian Air Force on the Place Royale/Koningsplein in 2016, involving an F-16 jet

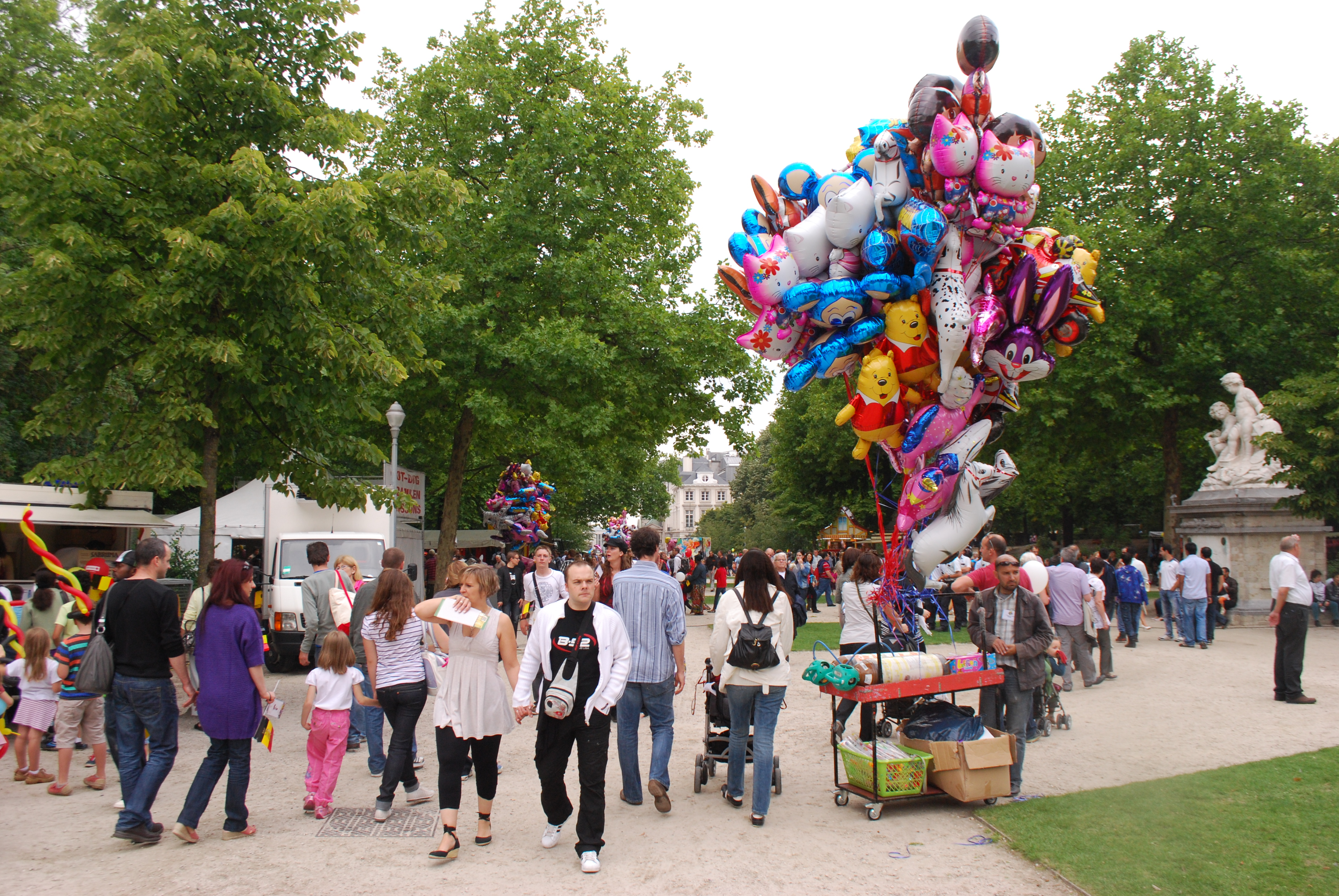
Fast-food kiosks, many selling typically Belgian dishes such as fries or waffles, in Brussels Park in 2011

== Notable events ==
On National Day 2013, King Philippe formally ascended to the throne following the abdication of his father King Albert II.

== See also ==
- Culture of Belgium
- Belgium in the long nineteenth century
