= French Community Day =

Holiday of the French Community of Belgium

- Official name: French: Fête de la Communauté française
- Observed by: French Community of Belgium
- Date: 27 September
- Next time: 27 September 2027
- Frequency: annual
- Related to: Flemish Community Day, Day of the German-speaking Community, Day of the Walloon Region, King's Feast

The French Community Day (French: Fête de la Communauté française) is an annual holiday held in the French Community of Belgium on 27 September. It is also variously translated as the Day of the French Community, French Community Holiday, Feast Day of the French Community, Festival of the French Community, or other variants.

This date was chosen by the French Community of Belgium after an important episode in the Belgian Revolution.

== Origins ==
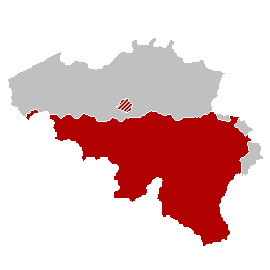
The area of the French Community of Belgium

The Belgian Revolution from the United Kingdom of the Netherlands erupted on the night of 25 August 1830, following a performance of Daniel Auber's sentimental and patriotic opera La Muette de Portici, a tale suited to fire National Romanticism, for it was set against Masaniello's uprising against the Spanish masters of Naples in the 17th century. The play caused a riot and the crowd poured into the streets after the performance, shouting patriotic slogans, and swiftly took possession of government buildings.

The affable and moderate Crown Prince William, who represented the monarchy in Brussels, was convinced by the Estates-General on 1 September that the administrative separation of north and south was the only viable solution to the crisis. His father rejected the terms of accommodation that he proposed.

King William I attempted to restore the establishment order by force, but the royal army under Prince Frederik was unable to retake Brussels in bloody street fighting on 23 to 26 September. A provisional government was declared in Brussels on 26 September, and during the night of the 26–27 the Dutch troops retreated.

Fernand Massart, a Walloon politician active in the 1960s and 1970s, proposed Walloons celebrate on 27 September in commemoration of the victory. On 24 June 1975, the date was chosen by the French Community as French Community Day, and it was first celebrated that same year.

== Modern celebrations ==
All schools are closed for the holiday, though many business remain open. The festival is celebrated with many free concerts featuring francophone acts. These take place throughout the French Community, in cities such as Mons, Namur, Huy, Liège, Charleroi and Brussels. Theatrical performances and sporting events also take place in some areas.

The Flemish Community has a parallel holiday called the Flemish Community Day, held on 11 July. It commemorates the Battle of the Golden Spurs in 1302.

== See also ==
- History of Belgium
- Public holidays in Belgium
