= Day of the Walloon Region =

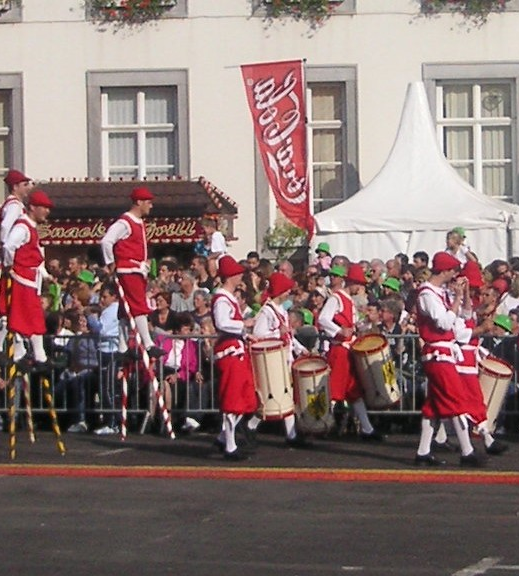
- Stiltwalkers in Namur
- Official name: French: Fête de la Wallonie
- Observed by: Wallonia, Belgium
- Date: Third Sunday in September
- 2024 date: September 15
- 2025 date: September 21
- 2026 date: September 20
- 2027 date: September 19
- Frequency: annual
- Related to: French Community Holiday

The Day of the Walloon Region or simply the Day of Wallonia (French: Fête de la Wallonie) is the annual public holiday of Wallonia, the southern region of Belgium. It is celebrated each third Sunday of September and commemorates the participation of the Walloons to the Belgian Revolution in 1830.

== See also ==
- French Community Holiday
