= King's Feast =

Annual Belgian celebration

King's feast
- Official name: Dutch: Koningsfeest, French: Fête du Roi, German: Festtag des Königs
- Observed by: Belgium
- Date: 15 November
- Next time: 15 November 2025
- Frequency: annual

The King's Feast (Dutch: Koningsdag; French: Fête du Roi; German: Festtag des Königs) has been celebrated in Belgium on November 15 since 1866. Since 2001, the Belgian Federal Parliament has held a ceremony in honor of the King, in the presence of members of the Belgian royal family and other dignitaries. It is not a national public holiday; however, federal government institutions are closed on this day. Traditionally, a Te Deum is sung as well as a private observance being held.

November 15 is the name day of Leopold (the feast of Saint Leopold in the German liturgical calendar) and Albert (the feast of Saint Albert the Great in the General Roman Calendar). In 1951, King Baudouin decided to honor November 15, as did his brother King Albert II. During the regency of Prince Charles, the designations Day of the Dynasty or Feast of the Dynasty were used, and these terms are still often erroneously used. However, it is not the correct name, as was confirmed in a circular letter in 1953.
