= Constitution Day =

Holiday honoring a country's constitution

Constitution Day is a holiday to honour the constitution of a country. Constitution Day is often celebrated on the anniversary of the signing, promulgation or adoption of the constitution, or in some cases, to commemorate the change to constitutional monarchy.

== List of Constitution Days ==
National Constitution Days
Country	Date	Constitution	Local name	Public Holiday	Note
Abkhazia	26 November 1994	Constitution of Abkhazia			
Andorra	14 March 1993	Constitution of Andorra	Dia de la Constitució		
Argentina	1 May 1853	Constitution of Argentina		No	
Armenia	5 July 1995	Constitution of Armenia		Yes	
Australia	9 July 1900	Constitution of Australia		No	
Azerbaijan	12 November 1995	Constitution of Azerbaijan		No	
Bangladesh	4 November 1972	Constitution of Bangladesh	সংবিধান দিবস	No	
Belarus	15 March 1994	Constitution of Belarus	Dzień Kanstytucyji		
Belgium	21 July 1890	Constitution of Belgium	Nationale feestdag van België (in Dutch) Fête nationale belge (in French)		
Bosnia and Herzegovina	14 December 1995	Constitution of Bosnia and Herzegovina	Ustav Bosne i Hercegovine / Устав Босне и Херцеговине		
Brazil	15 November 1889	Constitution of Brazil	Dia da Proclamação da República	Yes	
Cambodia	24 September 1993	Constitution of Cambodia			
Canada	29 March 1867	Constitution of Canada		No	
China	4 December 1982	Constitution of China	国家宪法日 (guójiā xiànfǎrì)	No	
Cook Islands	4 August 1965	Constitution of the Cook Islands	Te Maeva Nui Celebrations		
Croatia	22 December 1990	Constitution of Croatia	Ustav Republike Hrvatske / Božićni ustav	No	
Denmark	5 June (1849, 1953)	Constitution of Denmark	Grundlovsdag		
Dominican Republic	6 November 1844	History of the Dominican Republic			
Ethiopia	16 July 1931	1931 Constitution of Ethiopia			
Faroe Islands	5 June (1849, 1953)	Constitution of Denmark	Grundlovsdag		
Fiji	7 September 2013	2013 Constitution of Fiji			First observed in 2016.
Finland	17 July 1919	Constitution of Finland		No	
Germany	23 May 1949	Constitution of Germany			
Ghana	7 January 2019	Constitution of Ghana			
Hungary	20 August 1949	Constitution of Hungary	Az alkotmány ünnepe	No, but the day itself is a public holiday being the St. Stephen's Day	
India	26 November 1949	Constitution of India	National Law Day; Samvidhan Divas	No	
Indonesia	18 August 1945	Constitution of Indonesia		No	
Ireland	29 December 1937	Constitution of Ireland		No	
Italy	1 January 1948	Constitution of Italy			
Japan	3 May 1947	Constitution of Japan			
Kazakhstan	30 August 1995	Constitution of Kazakhstan			
Kyrgyzstan	5 May 1993	Constitution of Kyrgyzstan			
Latvia	1 May 1920	Constitution of Latvia			Day of Inauguration of the Constitutional Assembly of Latvia.
Lithuania	25 October 1992	Constitution of Lithuania			
Maldives	22 December 1932				
Marshall Islands	1 May 1979	Compact of Free Association			
Mexico	5 February 1917	Constitution of Mexico	Día de la Constitución		Public holiday for Constitution Day is first Monday of February.
Micronesia	10 May 1979	Constitution of Micronesia			
Moldova	29 July 1994	Constitution of Moldova	Ziua Constituției	No	
Mongolia	13 January 1992	Constitution of Mongolia	ᠮᠣᠩᠭᠤᠯ ᠤᠯᠤᠰ ᠤᠨ ᠦᠨᠳᠦᠰᠦᠨ ᠬᠠᠤᠯᠢ ᠶ᠋ᠢᠨ ᠡᠳᠦᠷ; Монгол Улсын Үндсэн хуулийн өдөр	No	
Nauru	17 May 1968	Constitution of Nauru			The Constitution of Nauru came into force in January 1968. The date of Constitution Day, 17 May 1968, marks the date the Constitutional Convention made alterations to the Constitution.
Netherlands	3 November 1848	Constitution of Netherlands			
Niue	19 October 1974	Niue Constitution Act			
Norway	17 May 1814	Constitution of Norway	Syttende mai	Yes	
North Korea	27 December 1972	Constitution of North Korea	사회주의 헌법절 (sahoejuŭi hŏnpŏpchŏl)	Yes	Previously named the Socialist Constitution Day. Renamed to Constitution Day on 29 December 2025.
Pakistan	10 April 1973	Constitution of Pakistan			
Palau	9 July 1980	Constitution of Palau			
Philippines	2 February 1987	1987 Constitution	Araw ng Saligang Batas (in Filipino)	No	First observed in 2002
Poland	3 May 1791	Constitution of 3 May 1791	Święto Konstytucji 3 Maja	Yes	
Puerto Rico	25 July 1952	Constitution of Puerto Rico	Día de la Constitución del Estado Libre Asociado		
Romania	8 December 1991	Constitution of Romania		No	
Russia	12 December 1993	Constitution of Russia			Has been a working holiday since 2005
Serbia	15 February 1835	Constitution of Serbia	Dan državnosti	Yes	
Seychelles	18 June 1993	Constitution of Seychelles		Yes	This was Seychelles' National Day until 2015.
Slovakia	1 September 1992	Constitution of the Slovak Republic	Deň Ústavy Slovenskej republiky		
Spain	6 December 1978	Constitution of Spain	Día de la Constitución Española		
South Korea	17 July 1948	Constitution of South Korea	제헌절 (jeheonjeol)	Yes	
Sweden	6 June (1809, 1974).	Basic Laws of Sweden	Sveriges nationaldagDay of the Swedish flag		
Switzerland	12 September 1848	Swiss Federal Constitution		No	Adoption of the 1st Federal Constitution.
Taiwan	25 December 1947	Constitution of the Republic of China	行憲紀念日 (xíngxiàn jìniànrì)	Yes	
Tajikistan	6 November 1994	Constitution of Tajikistan			
Thailand	10 December 1932	Constitution of Thailand	Wan Ratthathammanun		
Turkmenistan	18 May 1992	Constitution of Turkmenistan			
Turks and Caicos Islands	30 August 1976	Constitution of Turks and Caicos Islands			
Ukraine	28 June 1996	Constitution of Ukraine		Yes	Ukrainian Constitution Day has been a public holiday since 1996 and the capital city of Kyiv will host a number of events to mark the day.
United States	17 September 1787	Constitution of the United States	Constitution Day and Citizenship Day	No	
Uruguay	18 July 1830	Constitution of Uruguay	Jura de la Constitución (de la República Oriental del Uruguay)		
Uzbekistan	8 December 1992	Constitution of Uzbekistan	Konstitutsiya Kuni (in Uzbek)		
Vanuatu	5 October 1979	Constitution of Vanuatu			

International Constitution Days
Organization	Date	Constitution	Day Name	Note
World Constitution and Parliament Association (WCPA)	27 June 1977	Constitution for the Federation of Earth	World Constitution Day	Also known as New Age Day

== Other ==
- Day of the Flemish Community, 11 July (Flemish community only). Known locally as Feestdag van Vlaanderen.
- Day of the German-speaking Community, 15 November (German-speaking community only). Known locally as Feiertag der Deutschsprachigen Gemeinschaft.
- French Community Holiday, 27 September (French-speaking community only). Known locally as Fête de la Communauté française.
- Wallonia Day, third Sunday of September (Walloon Region only).

== Photo gallery ==
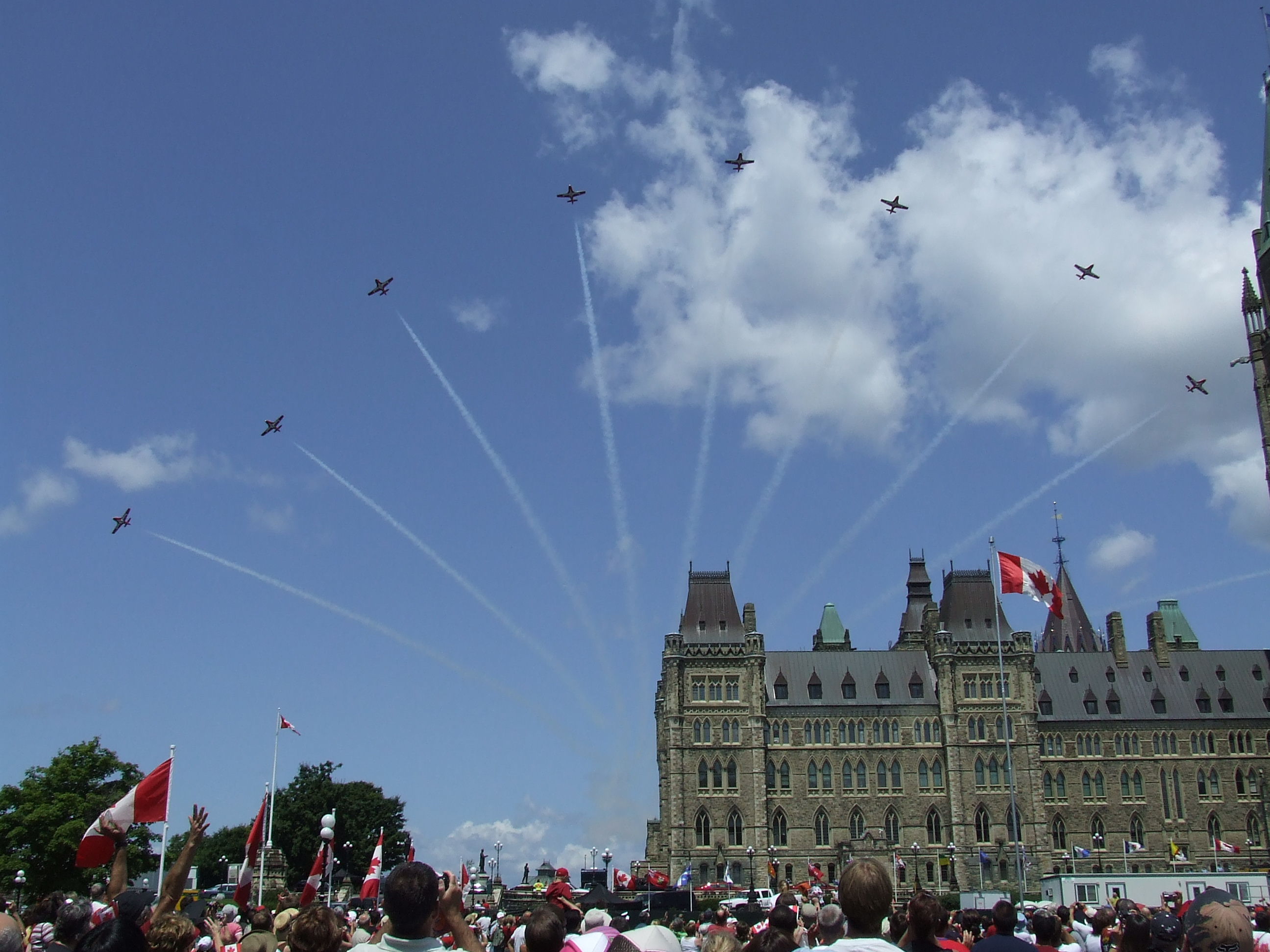
Aerial display of Canadian Snowbirds during the Canada Day celebrations in Ottawa in 2008

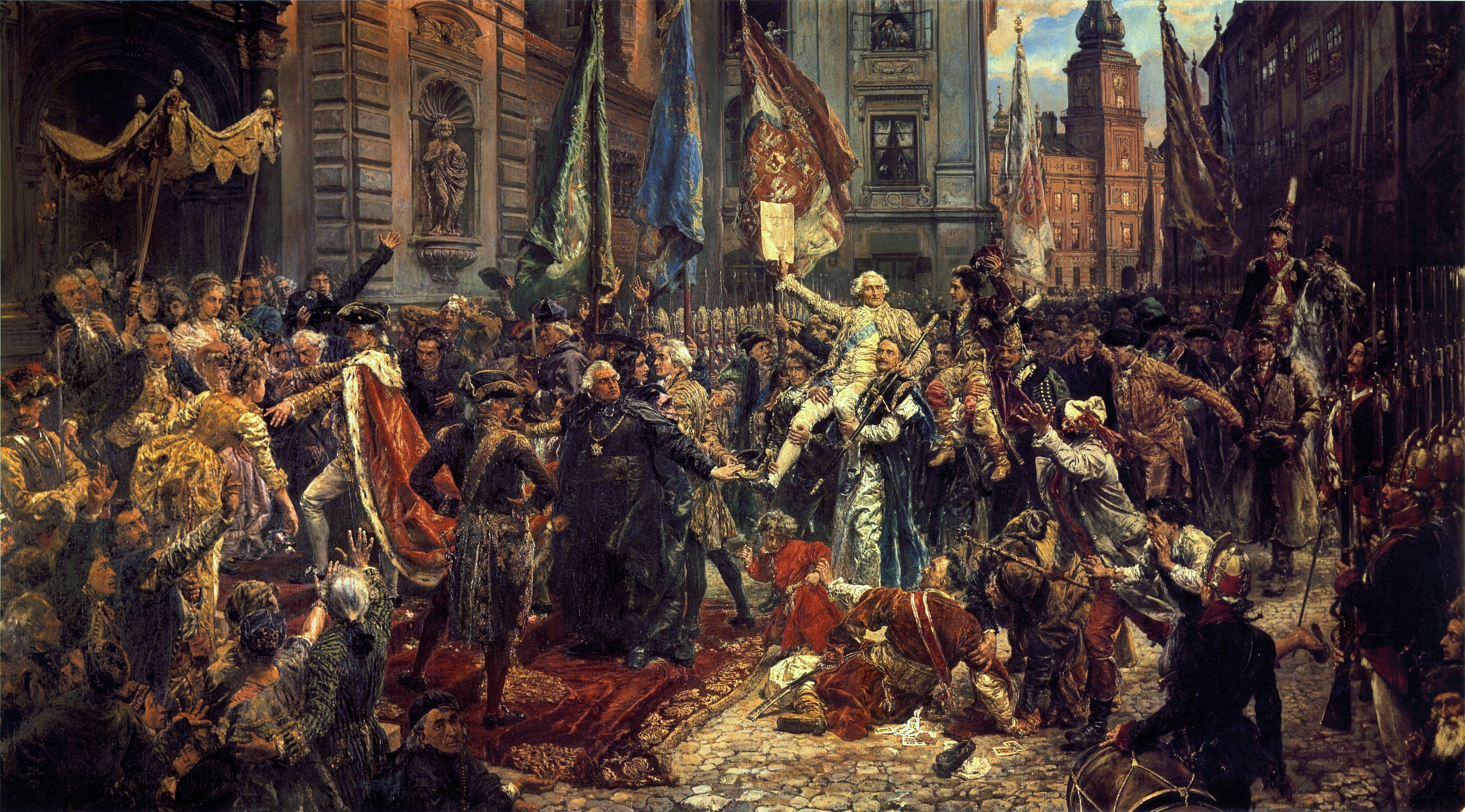
Constitution of 3 May 1791 – oil on canvas, painted by Jan Matejko in 1891 (the centenary of the constitution)

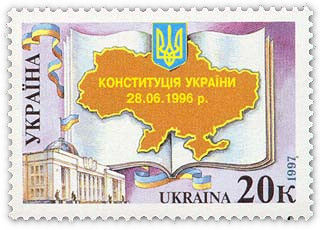
Ukrainian stamp depicting the adoption of Ukraine's new constitution on 28 June 1996

== See also ==
- Fiestas Patrias – Homeland national holidays of Mexico
- Flag Day
- Independence Day
- National Day
- Pledge Across America
- Public holiday
- Republic Day
