= Minsk GUVD Brass Band =

Police band in Belarus

The Minsk GUVD Brass Band (Russian: Духовой оркестр ГУВД Мингорисполкома) is a police band in Belarus that is attached to the Minsk City Police Department. Officially known as the Brass Band of the Main Directorate of Internal Affairs of the Minsk City Executive Committee, it is part of the Ministry of Internal Affairs of Belarus and the Belarusian Militsiya.

== History ==
The band was created by order of the Ministry of Public Order and Protection of the Byelorussian Soviet Socialist Republic on 10 October 1964. During its early existence, the band has visited many parts of the Soviet Union, including Western Siberia, the Mari Autonomous Soviet Socialist Republic and cities such as Gorky, Smolensk, and Pskov in the RSFSR. It also has been engaged in joint-Soviet, having performed for the Komsomol Central Committee and during a festival of friendship between the Ministry of Internal Affairs of Armenia and the Ministry of Internal Affairs of Belarus. In July 1986, it the wake of the consequences of the Chernobyl disaster, it visited Chernobyl to performs for city residents and the injured. In 1989, it took another relief trip to the zone affected by the 1988 Armenian earthquake (Spitak, Leninakan, Kirovakan).

After the collapse of the USSR, the geography of performances by the bans declined sharply. It gave its first performance as an independent Belarusian band in Germany in 1993, during which it hosted a concert in the state of Saarland. Over the years, the band became more active in conducting concerts in the territory of the Republic of Belarus and abroad. In 2010, it performed at the Frédéric Chopin Polish Baltic Philharmonic in Gdańsk.

== Awards & Recognition ==
The band is a multiple laureate of the All-Union Exhibition and Competition of creative teams of the Ministry of Internal Affairs of the Soviet Union and was a regular participant in all-Union concerts on the Day of Police. It is a 6 time laureate of various competitions of the Ministry of Internal Affairs of the USSR. Soloists and musicians of the orchestra have repeatedly received prizes at many international and national competitions. In 2018" band received the honorary title of the "Honored Collective of the Republic of Belarus".

== Duties ==
The brass band participates in department oath taking ceremonies public and festive ceremonies. The concert programs of the big band include works by Belarusian and foreign composers, popular songs, songs about the Second World War, folk music, jazz compositions. Performances in open areas, in parks, in places of mass recreation for citizens on weekends and holidays with entertainment and dance concert programs help to increase the image of state bodies of the Republic of Belarus among the population, increase the credibility of internal affairs bodies. At present, the musicians of the band have been at various concert venues in the capital, regional and district centers, cities and villages. In 2017, it performed during the parade and concert in honor of the Day of the Police of Belarus.

== See also ==
- Band of the Department of Carabinier Troops
- Military Band Service of the Armed Forces of the Republic of Belarus

== External media ==
- Official Website
