= National Foundation Day =

National Foundation Day may refer to:

- National Foundation Day (Japan)
- National Foundation Day (Korea)
