= Korean holidays =

Korean holidays may refer to:

- Public holidays in North Korea
- Public holidays in South Korea
- Traditional Korean holidays; see Korean calendar
