= Minsk City Police Department =

Municipal police force of Minsk, Belarus

Main Directorate of Internal Affairs of Minsk City Executive Committee Галоўнае ўпраўленне ўнутраных спраў Мінскага Гарвыканкама Главное управление внутренних дел Минского Горисполкома
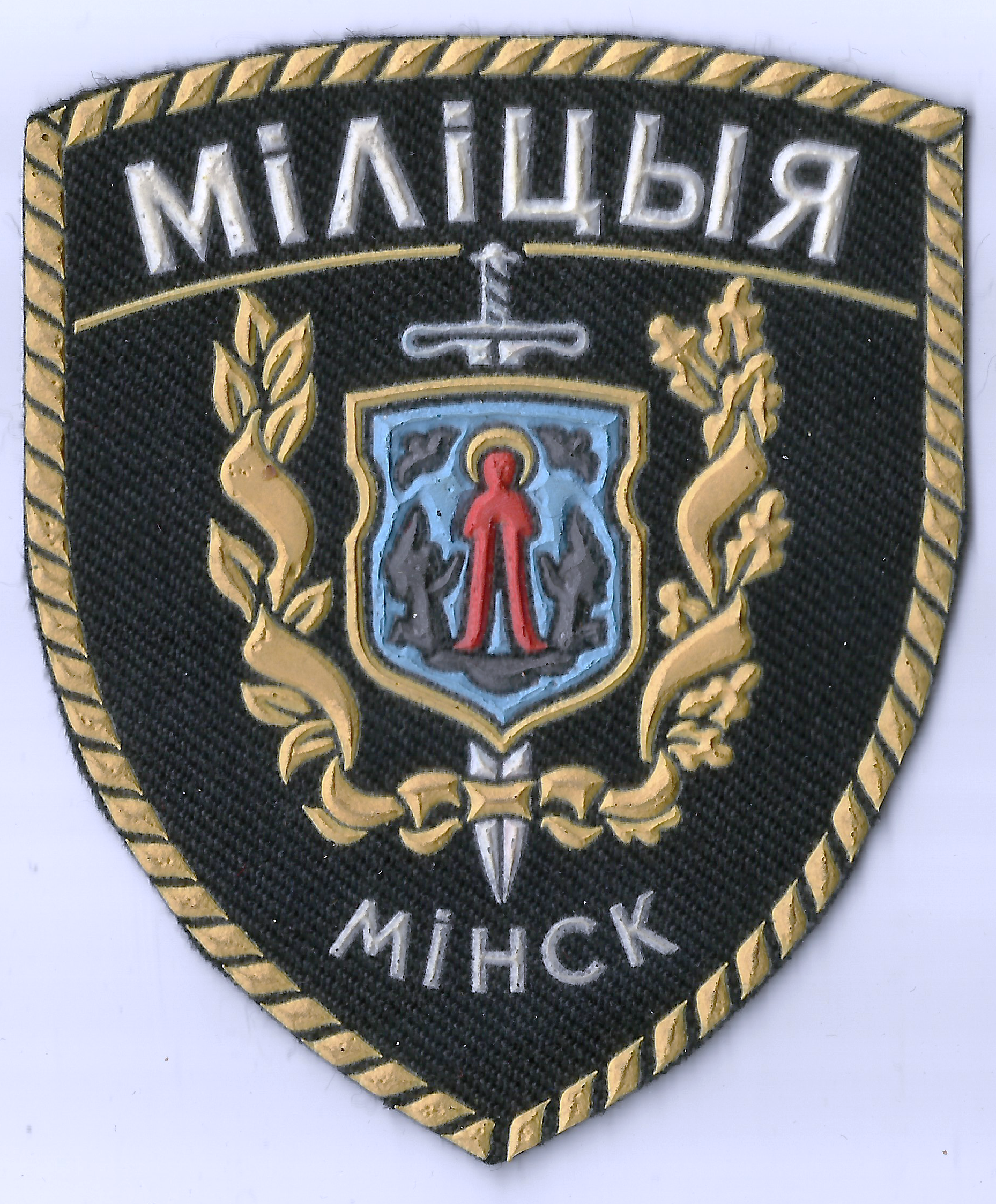
- Common name: Minsk City Police Department
- Abbreviation: GUVD Minsk

Agency overview
- Formed: November 30, 1920

Jurisdictional structure
- Operations jurisdiction: Minsk, Belarus
- Governing body: Ministry of Internal Affairs
- General nature: Local civilian police

Operational structure
- Headquarters: 49 Odintsov Street, Minsk
- Elected officer responsible: Ivan Kubrakov, Interior Minister
- Agency executive: Aleksandr Astreiko
- Parent agency: MVD of Belarus; Militsiya (Belarus)

Notables
- Anniversary: November 30 March 4

Website
- Official Site

The Minsk City Police Department (Belarusian: Галоўнае ўпраўленне ўнутраных спраў Мінскага Гарвыканкама, romanized: Haloŭnaje ŭpraŭlieńnie ŭnutranych spraŭ Minskaha Harvykankama; Russian: Главное управление внутренних дел Минского Горисполкома, lit. 'Main Directorate of Internal Affairs of the Minsk City Executive Committee') is the main municipal police force in the Belarusian capital of Minsk with responsibilities that include law enforcement and investigation in the city.

Minsk has the largest number of policemen per-capita among the post-Soviet republics. It is also one of the most active police forces in Belarus due to Minsk being the center of many protests and arrests.

== History ==
The department was founded as the Main Directorate of the Workers 'and Peasants' Militia of the Socialist Soviet Republic of Belarus on November 30, 1920. On July 10, 1934, the directorate was transformed into a branch of the newly formed People's Commissariat for Internal Affairs (NKVD), which was formed that same day in Moscow. One of the main tasks of the NKVD directorate in Minsk was to enforce the communist ideology imposed by the Communist Party of the Soviet Union.

In March 1946, the NKVD was replaced with the Ministry of Internal Affairs of the USSR. By order of the Ministry of Internal Affairs of the Belarusian SSR of June 2, 1947, No. 00130, two new branches were set up in the police department of the militia department of the Ministry of Internal Affairs to guide the peripheral police bodies along the lines of combating the theft of state and public property.

On June 5, 1991, the Ministry of Internal Affairs of the Belarusian SSR issued an order which placed the directorate under the Ministry of Internal Affairs' jurisdiction.

On October 2, 2020, the U.S. Treasury added Ivan Kubrakov, then head of the department, to its Specially Designated Nationals and Blocked Persons List. On the same day, he was banned from entering the European Union. Kubrakov was also sanctioned by the United Kingdom, Switzerland, and Canada.

On December 23, 2020, the MIAMCEC was designated under sanctions by the US Treasury Department for human rights violations related to the suppression of the 2020 Belarusian protests and placed in the Specially Designated Nationals and Blocked Persons List.

In summer 2021, Mikhail Hryb, the head of the department, was sanctioned by the EU, the US and Switzerland.

== Organization ==
=== Patrol Unit ===
The operations unit has taken part in the suppression of peaceful protests, including protests of Independence Day.

=== State Traffic Inspectorate ===
The State Traffic Inspectorate ensures road safety on the streets of Minsk. The unit currently uses three types of motorcycles, including a German-made BMW which was purchased in 2017. The inspectorate has been known to have been involved in many scandals, including a situation in August 2017 in which a police officer broke the window of a vehicle and dragged the driver out onto the street.

=== Criminal Investigations Unit ===
The Criminal Investigations Unit is responsible for the investigation of violent crimes. The unit commonly works with the FBI and the FSB in order to combat technologically advanced crimes.

=== Security and Protection Unit ===
The Security and Protection Unit provides security during public events in the capital. Since 2013, police officers of the department have been required to learn English.

=== Minsk GUVD Band ===
External videos
- Выступление оркестра ГУВД Мингорисполкома

The Minsk GUVD Brass Band has been operating in the directorate since October 10, 1964. It is similar in nature and purpose to the NYPD Police Band. In Soviet times, the band traveled all over the USSR and often performed in places that have experienced hardship, including Chernobyl in July 1986 and Leninakan in 1989. It gave its first performance as a Belarusian band in Germany in 1993.

== See also ==
- Okrestina, the infamous detention prison operated by the Minsk City Police Department, known for mass tortures of political prisoners
- Ministry of Internal Affairs (Belarus)
- Government of Belarus
- Ministry of the Interior Academy of the Republic of Belarus
