= Constitution Day (Pakistan) =

Pakistan national holiday on 10 April

- Also called: National Law Day
- Observed by: Pakistan
- Type: National holiday
- Significance: Commemorates the adoption of the country's constitution on this day in 1973
- Celebrations: Government ceremonies; Educational events
- Date: 10 April
- Next time: 10 April 2027
- Frequency: annual
- First time: 10 April 2023; 3 years ago
- Related to: Constitution of Pakistan

Constitution Day is celebrated in Pakistan on 10 April to commemorate the adoption of the country's constitution on this day in 1973. It is a national holiday in Pakistan and marks the establishment of the country's democratic governance.

== History ==
The Constitution of Pakistan, which is the supreme law of the country, provides for a federal parliamentary system with a President as the head of state and a Prime Minister as the head of government. It guarantees fundamental rights to all citizens, including the right to life, liberty, and property, and also includes provisions for the protection of minority rights.

== Celebration ==
The initiative to celebrate Constitution Day was first taken in 2015 by the former Chairman of the Senate, Raza Rabbani. However, it was not until the "Golden Jubilee Convention" in 2023 that the resolution to celebrate Constitution Day on a government/state level was presented by Prime Minister Shehbaz Sharif in a joint session of the Parliament. The convention was held to mark the 50th anniversary of the adoption of the 1973 Constitution of Pakistan.

== See also ==
- Constitution Day – other countries' celebrations
