= Public holidays in Belarus =

National holidays in Belarus are classified into state holidays and other holidays and commemorative days, including religious holidays. Nine of them are non-working days.

== Public holidays (non-working days) ==
Date	English name	Local name	Remarks
1-2 January	New Year's Day	Новы год (Novy Hod)	
7 January	Orthodox Christmas	Каляды праваслаўныя (Kalady pravasłaŭnyja)	
8 March	International Women's Day	Мiжнародны жаночы дзень (Mižnarodny žanočy dzień)	
moveable	Radonitsa	Радунiца (Radunica)	9 days after Orthodox Easter
1 May	Labour Day	Дзень працы (Dzień Pracy)	
9 May	Victory Day	Дзень Перамогi (Dzień Pieramohi)	Marks the victory against Nazi Germany in World War II
3 July	Independence Day	Дзень Незалежнасцi (Dzień Niezaležnasci)	Adopted in 1996, in commemoration of the Red Army's 1944 liberation of Minsk during the Minsk Offensive
7 November	October Revolution Day	Дзень Кастрычніцкай рэвалюцыі (Dzień Kastryčnickaj revalucyi)	
25 December	Christmas Day	Каляды каталiцкiя (Kalady katalickija)	

== Other holidays ==
=== State ===
Date	English name	Local name	Remarks
23 February	Defender of the Fatherland and Armed Forces Day	Дзень абаронцы Айчыны і Дзень Узброеных Сіл (Dzień abaroncy Ajčyny i Dzień Uzbrojenych Sil)	
4 March	Day of the Police of Belarus	Дзень міліцыі Беларусі (Dzień milicyi Bielarusi)	
15 March	Constitution Day	Дзень Канстытуцыi (Dzień Kanstytucyji)	Adopted in 1994
2 April	Unity of Peoples of Russia and Belarus Day	Дзень яднання народаў Беларусі i Расii (Dzień jadnańnia narodaŭ Biełarusi i Rasii)	
Second Sunday in May	State Flag and State Emblem Day	Дзень Дзяржаўнага Сцяга i Дзяржаўнага Герба (Dzień Dziaržaŭnaha Sciaha i Dziaržaŭnaha Hierba)	
17 September	National Unity Day	Дзень народнага адзiнства	

=== Commemorative and remembrance days ===
Date	English name	Local name	Remarks
15 February	Afghan War Veterans Day	Дзень памяці воінаў-інтэрнацыяналістаў (Dzień pamiaci voinaŭ-internacyjanalistaŭ)	It commermorates the end of the Soviet-Afghan War.
26 April	Chernobyl tragedy commemorative day	Дзень чарнобыльскай трагедыі (Dzień čarnobylskaj trahiedyji)	
22 June	Day of Remembrance of the victims of the Great Patriotic War	Дзень усенароднай памяці ахвяр Вялікай Айчыннай вайны (Dzień usienarodnaj pamiaci achviar Vialikaj Ajčynnaj vajny)	In solemn remembrance of all the victims of the Second World War, and in commemoration of the heroic last stand of Brest Fortress in 1941, on the very country and city (Brest) in which the Eastern Front began.

== Traditional holidays ==
Also, there are a number of traditional holidays.

Date	English name	Local name	Remarks
6-7 July	Kupalle	Купалле (Kupalle)	
2 November	Dziady	Дзяды (Dziady)	
moveable	Catholic Easter	Вялiкдзень каталiцкi (Vialikdzień katalicki)	
moveable	Orthodox Easter	Вялiкдзень праваслаўны (Vialikdzień pravasłaŭny)	
