= Public holidays in Uzbekistan =

Public holidays in Uzbekistan:

== Fixed date ==
Date	English name	Russian name	Uzbek name
January 1	New Year's Day	Новый Год	Yangi Yil Bayrami
March 8	International Women's Day	Международный Женский День	Xalqaro Xotin-Qizlar Kuni
March 21	Nowruz (Persian new year)	Навруз	Navro'z Bayrami
May 9	Day of Remembrance and Honor	День Памяти и Почестей	Xotira va Qadirlash Kuni
September 1	Independence Day	День Независимости	Mustaqillik Kuni
October 1	Teachers' Day	День Учителя и Наставника	O'qituvchi va Murabbiylar Kuni
December 8	Constitution Day	День Конституции	Konstitutsiya Kuni
1st Shawwal	Eid al-Fitr	Рамадан Ид	Ramazon Hayit
10th Dhu al-Hijjah	Eid al-Adha	Ид аль-Адха	Qurbon Hayit

== See also ==
- Portal: Uzbekistan
