= National Foundation Day (Korea) =

South Korean holiday (3 October)

Gaecheonjeol
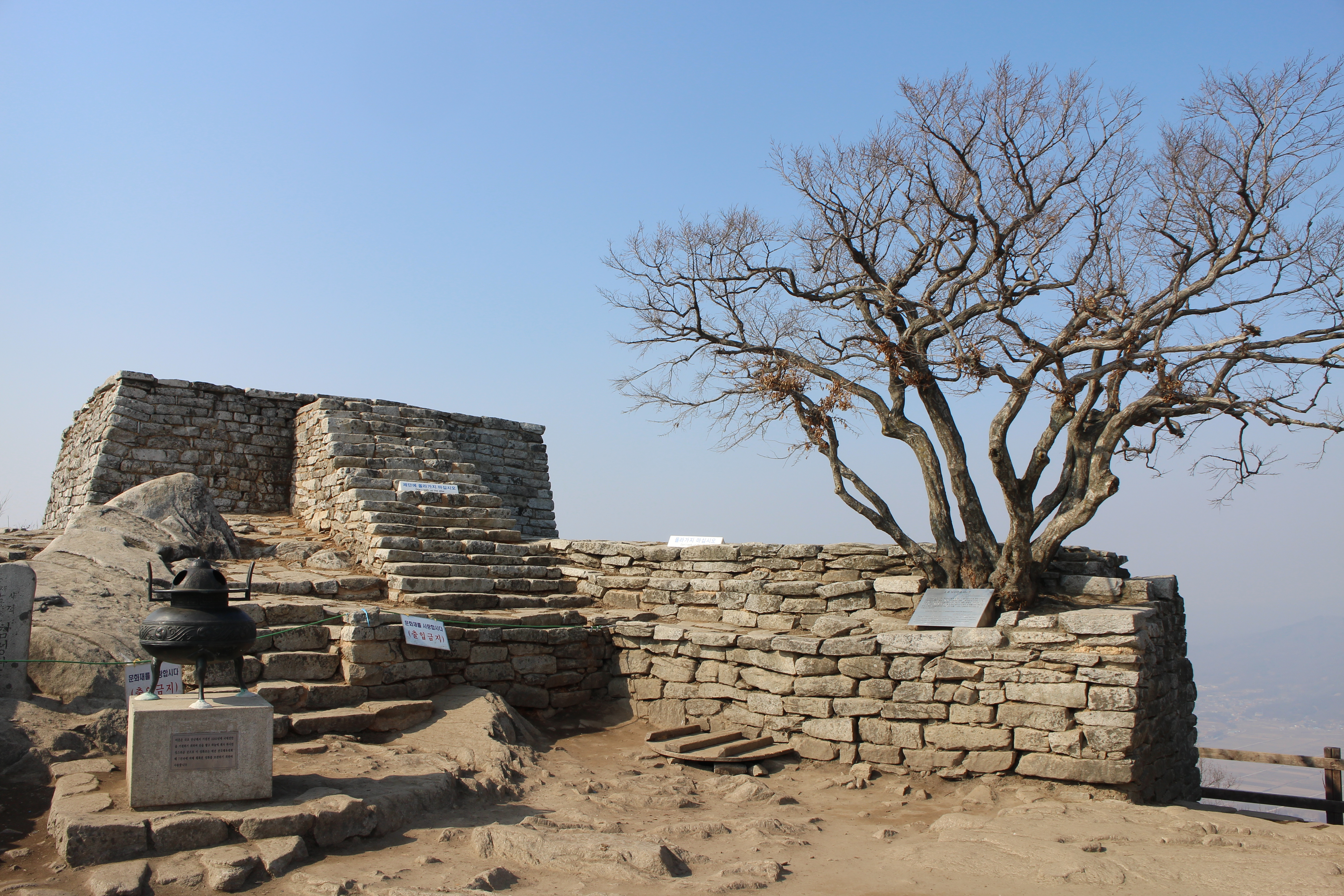
- Chamseongdan Altar, erected by Tan'gun
- Official name: Gaecheonjeol
- Also called: National Foundation Day
- Observed by: South Korea; North Korea
- Type: National
- Significance: Celebrates the myth of the founding of the state of Gojoseon
- Date: 3 October
- Frequency: Annual

Korean name
- Hangul: 개천절
- Hanja: 開天節
- Lit.: The day the heavens opened
- RR: Gaecheonjeol
- MR: Kaech'ŏnjŏl

Gaecheonjeol (Korean: 개천절; Hanja: 開天節; lit. ''The day the heavens opened'') is a public holiday in South Korea on 3 October. Also known by the English name National Foundation Day, this holiday celebrates the legendary formation of the first Korean state of Gojoseon by legendary king Tan'gun in 2333 BC. This date has traditionally been regarded by Koreans as the date for the founding of the Korean nation.

Gaecheonjeol is also recognized in North Korea, although not as a public holiday, with an annual ceremony at the Mausoleum of Tangun, the founder of Gojoseon.

== Origin ==
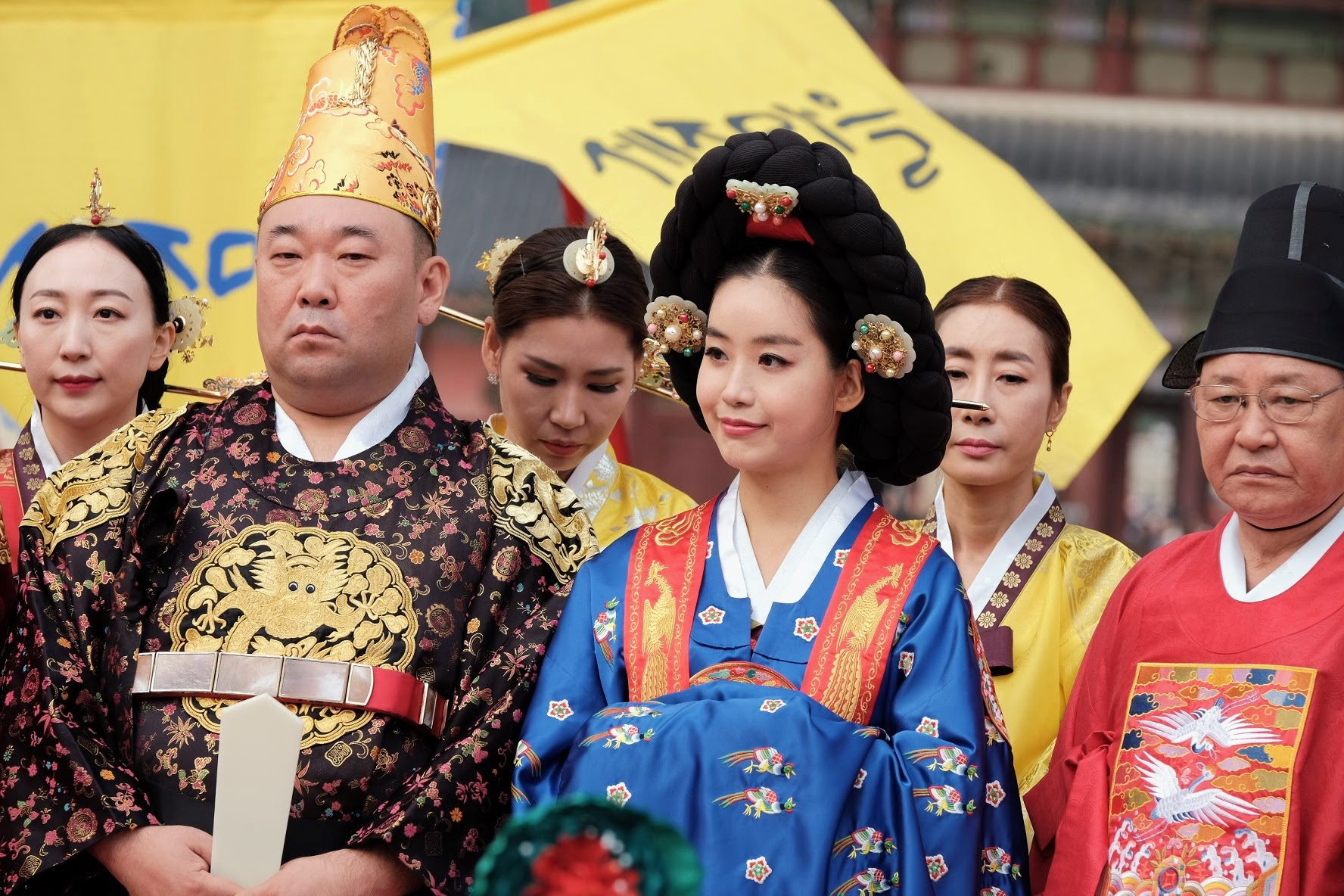
People in traditional costume at Gaecheonjeol 2018, Seoul

Gae-cheon ('Opening of Heaven') refers to 3 October 2457 BCE, the date when Hwanung (환웅) descended from heaven to live with mankind.

The harvest ceremony was celebrated in the Korean realms; Yeonggo (영고; 迎鼓) of Buyeo; Mucheon (무천; 舞天) of Yemaek; Gyeeum (계음; 契飮) of Mahan and Byeonhan; Dongmaeng (동맹; 東盟) of Goguryeo; and Palgwanhoe (팔관회; 八關會) of Silla.

In 1909, Gaecheonjeol was established as a national holiday. At first, the holiday was observed on the third day of the 10th month on the lunar calendar, but it has been fixed on 3 October of the solar Gregorian calendar since 1949.

== History ==
On 15 January 1909, when Daejongism reopened its gate with Nachul at the center, it was established as a celebration day and celebrated every year. Events like this contributed to fostering the spirit of the Korean people under the pressure of Japanese colonial rule.

When the Provisional Government of the Republic of Korea was established in 1919, the provisional government established 3 October of the lunar calendar as a national holiday. This is based on the universal perception of history, which saw Tan'gun as the founder of the Hankyoreh at the time and Gojoseon as the first nation of the Korean people.

Following the establishment of the Republic of Korea after Korea's liberation from Japanese colonial rule, the Dangungiwon (단군기원; 檀君紀元), or dan-gi (단기; 檀紀), was enacted as the official calendar of the nation in the "Act on official calendars" on 25 September 1948. On 1 October 1949, the "Act on National Day of celebration" was enacted and the date of the third lunar month was designated as the Gaecheonjeol. Since it was originally a lunar calendar, it had been used as a lunar calendar even after the establishment of the Korean government, but after the deliberation of the "Deliberation Council regarding the change of celebrations of gaecheonjeol from the lunar calendar to the solar calendar," which was appointed by the Culture and Education Ministry in 1949, it changed the lunar calendar into a solar calendar and became a great practice as it was said that the records of 3 October were precious.

On the other hand, Daejongism believes that the original meaning of the word "Gaecheon" is not Tan'gun's founding day, but the third day of the lunar month of October 2457 BC, when Hwanung opened the sky gate and came down below Sin Dansu, Taebaek Mountain, and began the great work of Hongikingan (弘益人間, translated as 'to widely benefit the humans') and Yihwasegye (理化世界, translated as 'ruling the word with reason').

== National Foundation Day Song ==
The song was originally sung by people who were believers of Daejongism. After the National Foundation Day becomes as a national holiday, the lyrics were changed as it is sung nowadays.

The lyrics are as follows.

Section 1
우리가 물이라면 새암이 있고 If we are water, we would have a fountain that we originated from.
우리가 나무라면 뿌리가 있다. If we are a tree, there must be our roots that we originate from.
이 나라 한아버님은 단군이시니 The great father of this country is dangun (implying their root and fountain is dangun).
이 나라 한아버님은 단군이시니 The great father of this country is dangun.

Section 2
백두산 높은 터에 부자요 부부 In the high place of Mountain Paekdu a father (hwanin) gave mysterious thing to his son (hwanung).
성인의 자취 따라 하늘이 텄다. Following the traces of a saint, the heaven has opened.
이날이 시월 상달에 초사홀이니 Since this is the first three days of October that is a harvest month.
이날이 시월 상달에 초사홀이니 Since this is the first three days of October that is a harvest month.

Section 3
오래다 멀다해도 줄기는 하나 The stem is still one, even though it was a long time ago.
다시 필 단쪽잎에 삼천리 곱다 The sandalwood leaves that will bloom again would be beautiful from 3000 li.
잘 받아 빛내오리다 맹세하노니 I swear i would receive it (the stem or the beauty of dangun) and make you (probs dangun) shine.
잘 받아 빛내오리다 맹세하노니 I swear i would receive it (the stem or the beauty of dangun) and make you (probs dangun) shine.

== See also ==
- Public holidays in South Korea
- Public holidays in North Korea
- Gojoseon
- Korean mythology
- Dan-gun-wang-gum
