= Militsiya (Belarus) =

Belarusian law enforcement agency

Militsiya of the Republic of Belarus Міліцыя Рэспублікi Беларусь (Belarusian) Милиция Республики Беларусь (Russian)
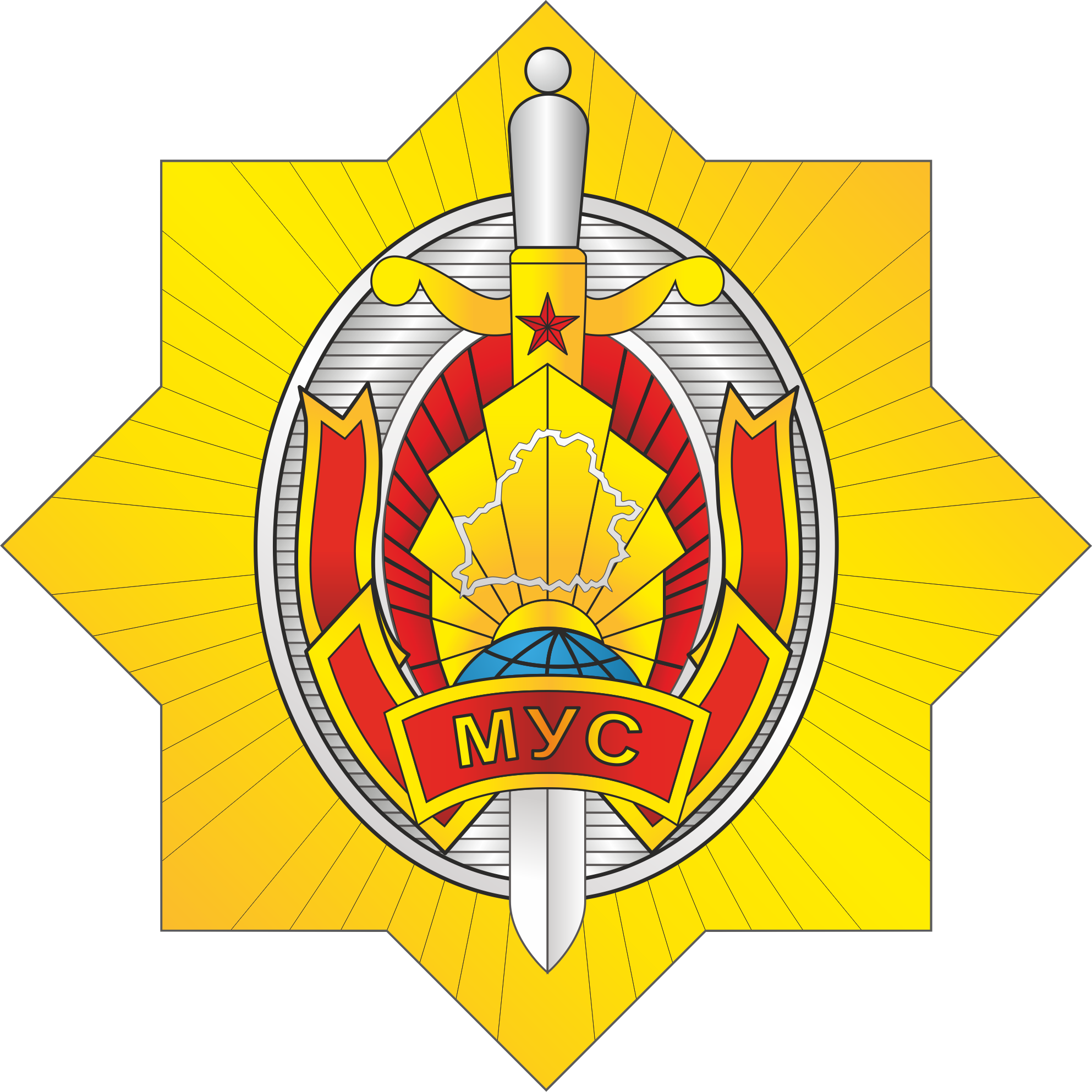
- Belarusian Militsiya emblem
- Common name: Militsiya

Agency overview
- Formed: 1 March 1991
- Preceding agency: Militsiya

Jurisdictional structure
- National agency (Operations jurisdiction): Belarus
- Operations jurisdiction: Belarus
- Legal jurisdiction: Belarus
- General nature: Civilian police

Operational structure
- Parent agency: Ministry of Internal Affairs
- Child agency: Minsk City Police Department

The Militsiya of the Republic of Belarus (Belarusian: Міліцыя Рэспублікi Беларусь, romanized: Militsyya Respubliki Byelarus, Russian: Милиция Республики Беларусь, romanized: Militsiya Respubliki Belarus) is a law enforcement agency in Belarus responsible for regular policing duties in the country.

== History ==
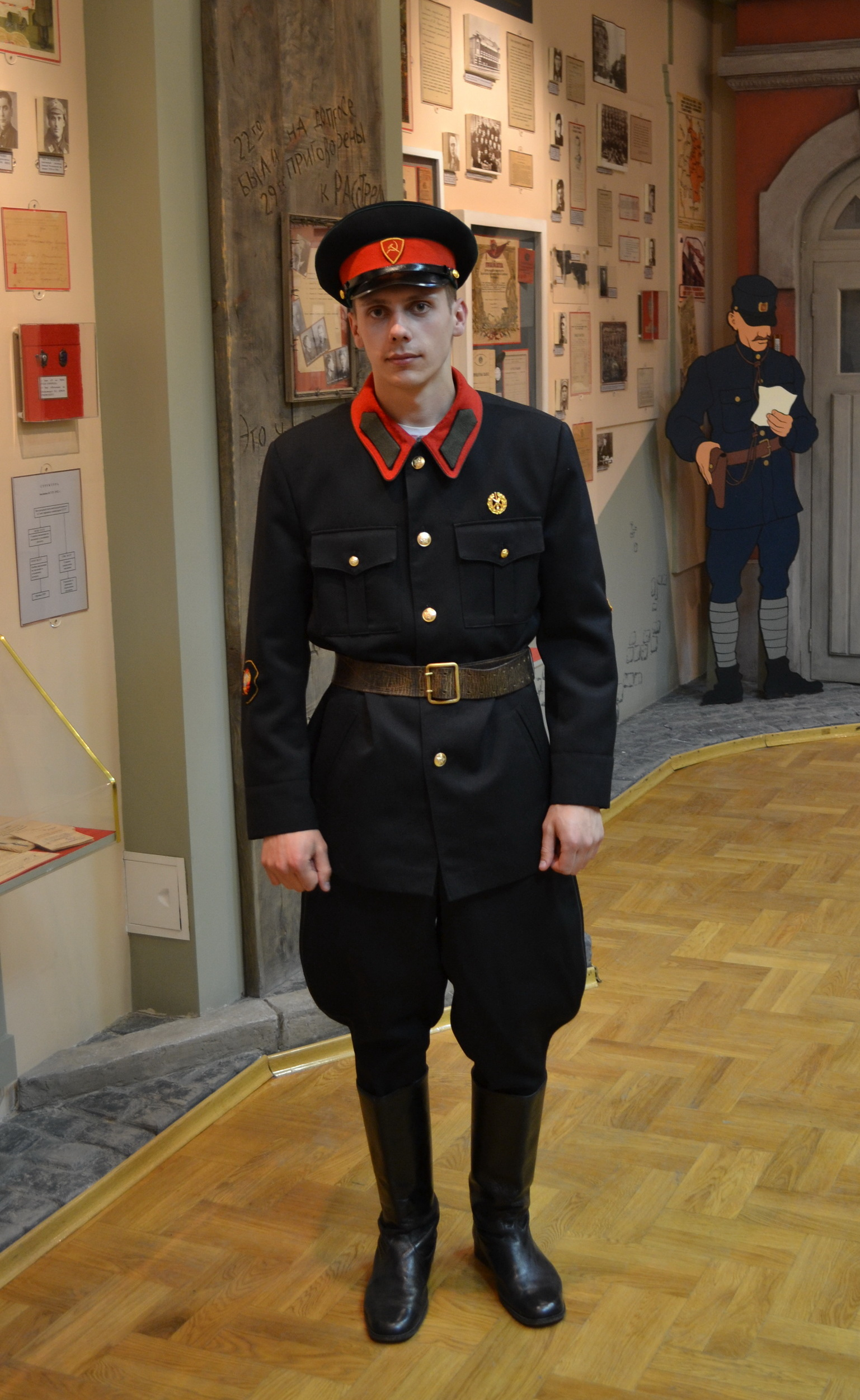
Soviet-era Belarusian policeman's uniform, Museum of the Ministry of Internal Affairs of Belarus

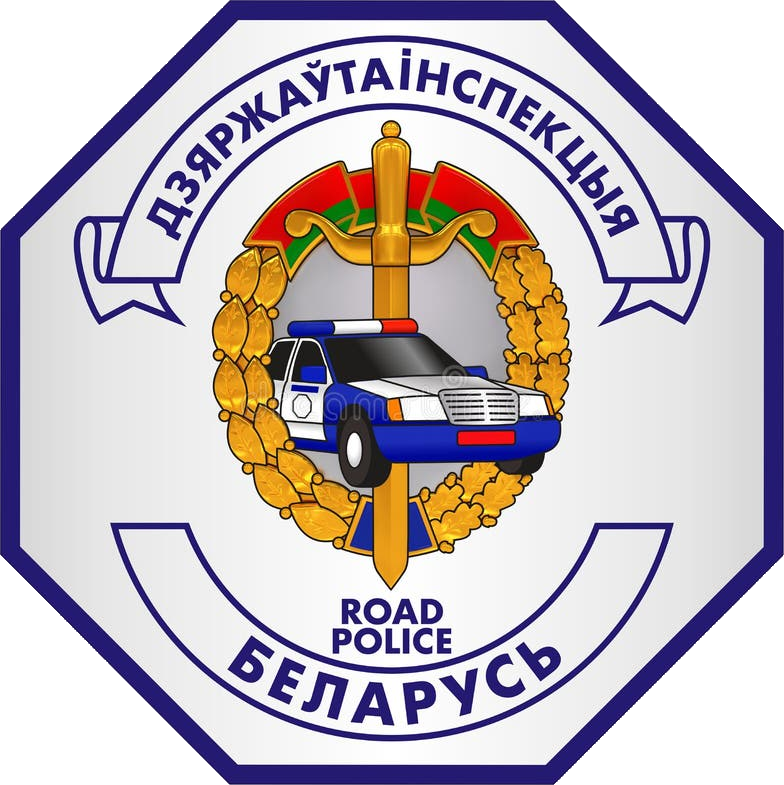
Road Police emblem of Belarus

The original Belarusian Militsiya was founded on 4 March 1917 during the events of the February Revolution, when prominent Bolshevik leader and politician Mikhail Frunze was appointed temporary police chief of the local Minsk civilian militia. Just three days later, various Belarusian cities began the process of creating police departments. The provisional regulations on the police were issued on 17 April 1917, establishing the Militsiya as an executive body of state power. In Belarus, as well as in newly formed Russian SFSR as a whole, the Militsiya replaced the previous Tsarist police services such as the Okhrana. On 10 November (28 October, O.S.) 1917, days after the October Revolution took place, the People's Commissariat for Internal Affairs (NKVD) issued a decree on the first normative act defining the creation of the Soviet Militsiya. A single police structure was developed for the Socialist Soviet Republic of Byelorussia in 1919, which enabled on 30 November 1920 in the form of the Main Police Administration of the BSSR. In July 1934, the NKVD took up secret police duties in the Belarusian SSR, with duties being transferred to the BSSR's Interior Ministry in March 1946. In early February 1962, law enforcement was handled solely by Soviet Belarusian authorities instead of the national agency. On 1 March 1991, the Supreme Soviet of Belarus enacted the Law "On the Police", which is the main legal act regulating the activities of the internal affairs bodies of an independent republic. On 17 July 2007, the National Assembly of Belarus adopted a law effectively making the Belarusian police a fundamental and flagship agency of the MVD/MUS. 4 March is today considered the birthday of the modern Belarusian police service.

== Structure ==
Its law enforcement central agency, the Militsiya, is considered to be the main policing and law enforcement agency in Belarus, consisting of services such as:

- National Police Headquarters
  - Criminal Police
    - Central Department of Criminal Investigation
    - Central Department for Combatting Economic Crimes
    - Department for Drug Control and Trafficking in Human Beings Combatting
  - Public Security Police
    - Central Department for Law and Order Ensuring and Prevention of Crimes
    - Department of State Traffic Police
    - Department of Daily On-Duty Service
  - Regional affiliates
    - Minsk City Police Department
    - Brest City Police Department
    - Gomel City Police Department
    - Mogilev City Police Department
    - Vitebsk City Police Department
  - Educational Institutions
    - The Academy of the Ministry of Internal Affairs of the Republic of Belarus
    - The Mogilev Institute of the Ministry of Internal Affairs
    - Centre for Professional Development of Executives and Specialists of the Ministry of Internal Affairs
    - Minsk City Cadet College № 1

== Police ranks ==
Officers

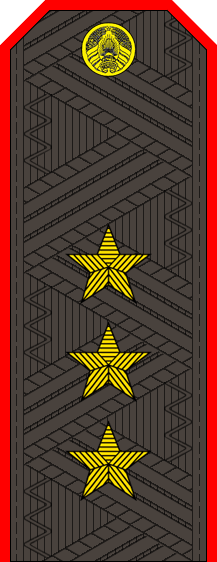
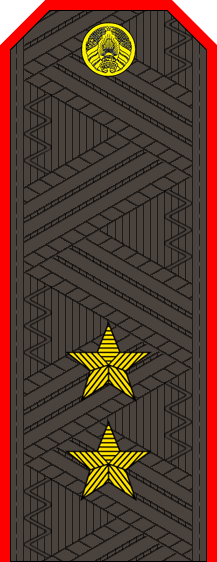
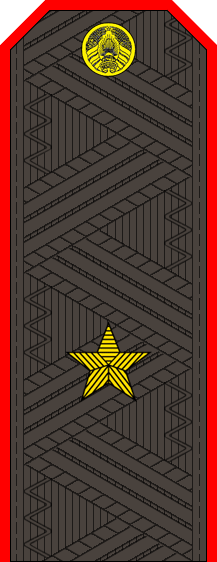
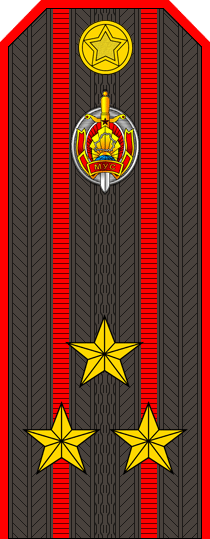
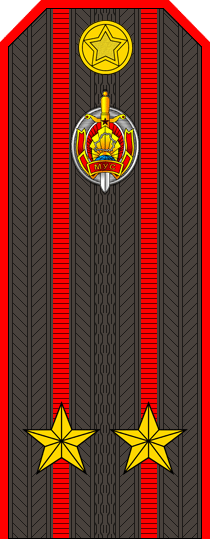
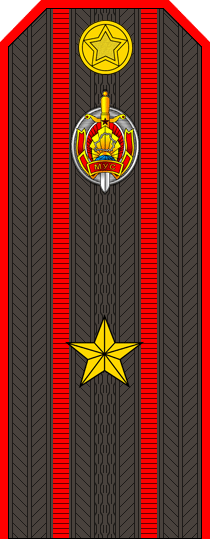
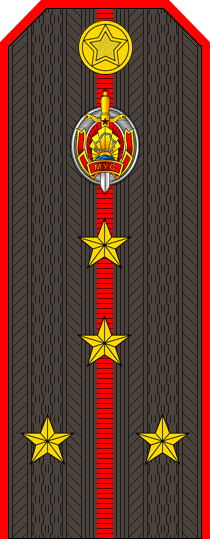
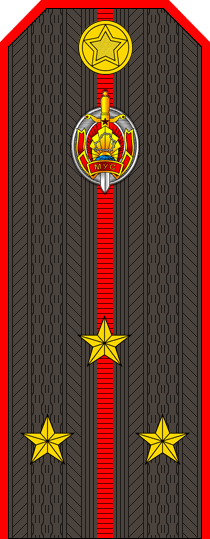
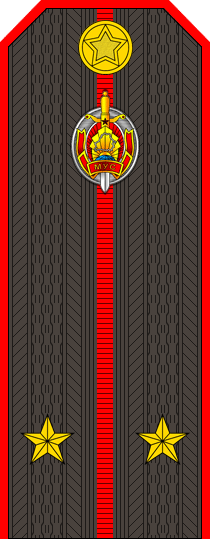
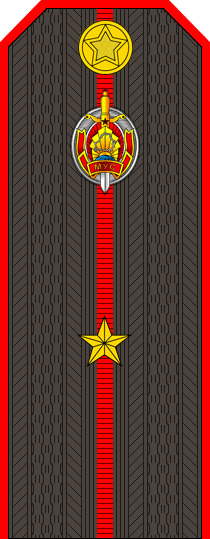
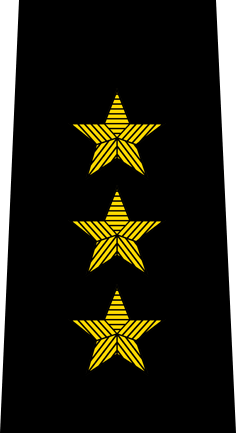
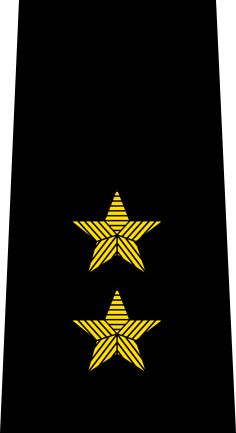
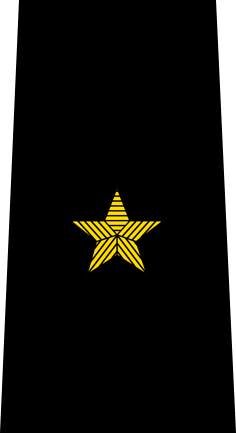
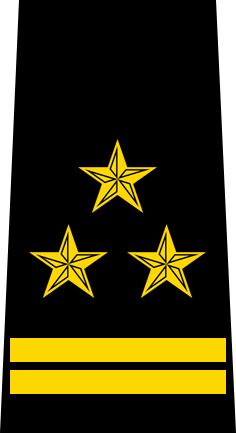
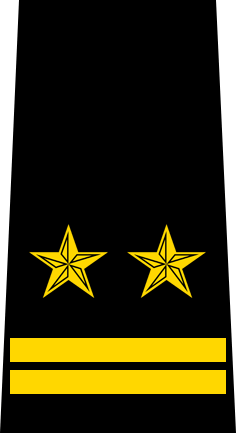
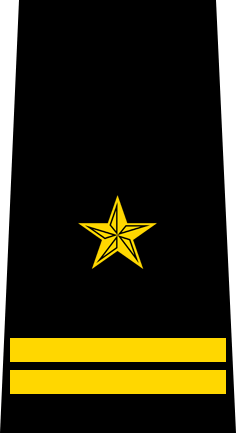
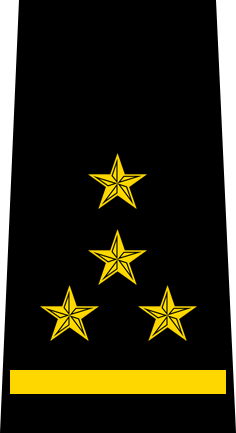
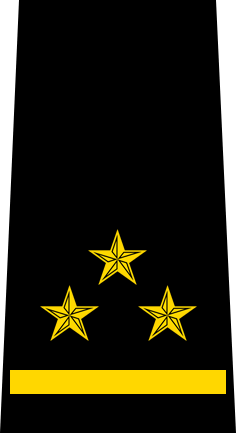
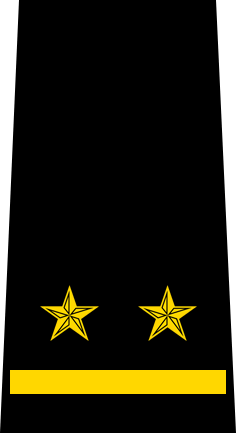
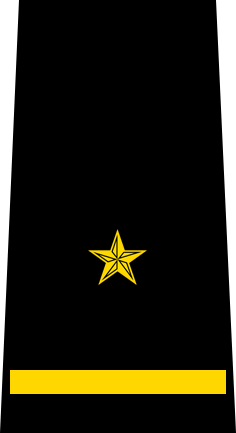
Rank group	General / flag officers			Senior officers			Junior officers
Militsiya
Militsiya	Ґенэрал-палкоўнік; G̀jeneral-palkoŭnik	Ґенэрал-лейтэнант; G̀jeneral-liejtenant	Ґенэрал-маёр; G̀jeneral-major	Палкоўнік; Palkoŭnik	Падпалкоўнік; Padpalkoŭnik	Маёр; Major	Капітан; Kapitan	Старшы лейтэнант Staršy liejtenant	Лейтэнант; Liejtenant	Малодшы лейтэнант Malodšy liejtenant

Cadets

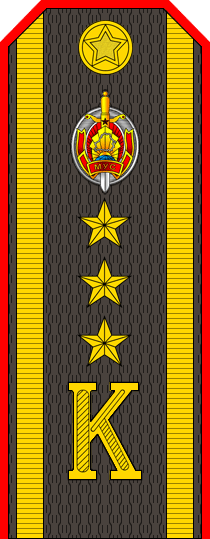
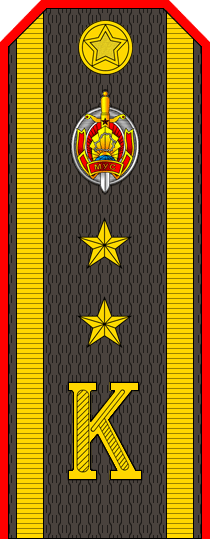
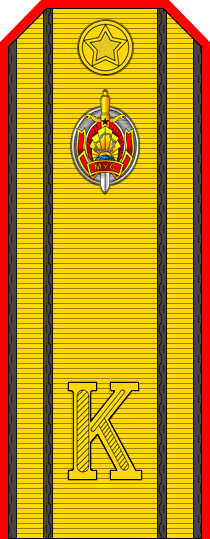
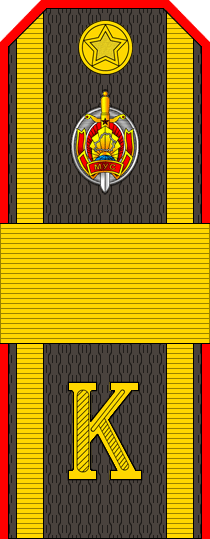
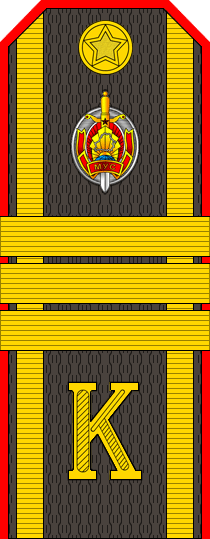
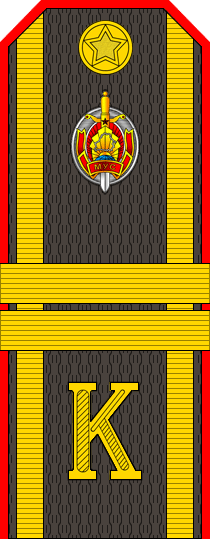
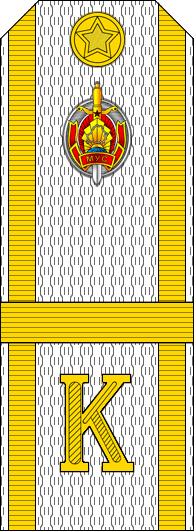
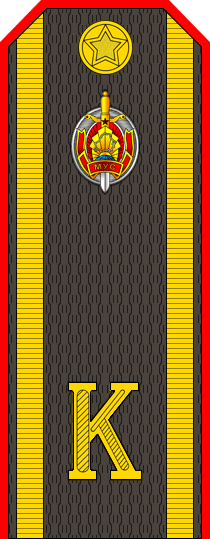
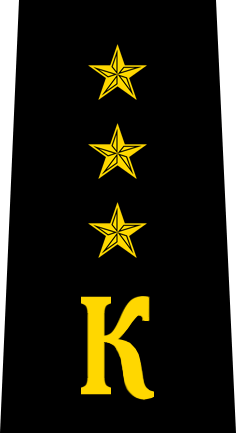
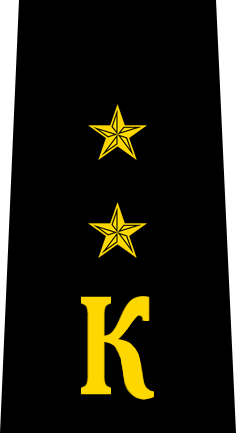
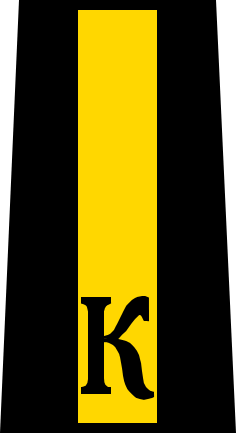
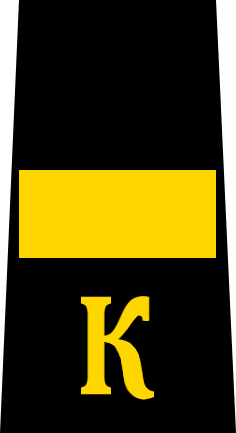
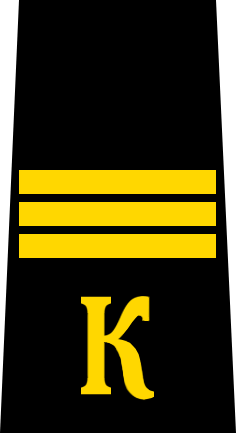
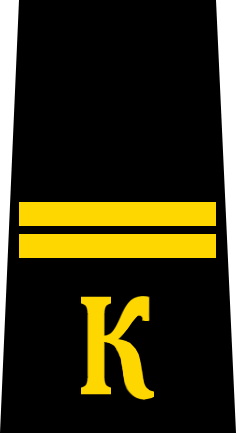
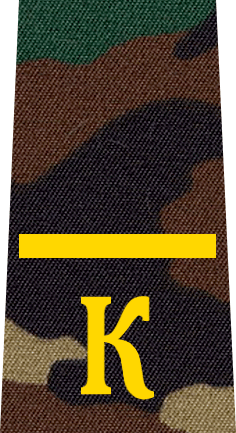
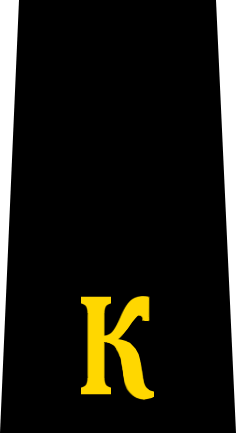
Rank group	Senior NCOs						Junior NCOs	Enlisted
Militsiya
Militsiya	Курсант Старшы прапаршчык Kursant Staršy praparščyk	Курсант Прапаршчык; Kursant Praparščyk	Курсант Старшына; Kursant Staršyna	Курсант Старшы сяржант Kursant Staršy siaržant	Курсант Сяржант; Kursant Siaržant	Курсант Малодшы сяржант Kursant Malodšy siaržant	Курсант Яфрэйтар; Kursant Jafrejtar	Курсант Радавы; Kursant Radavy

Enlisted

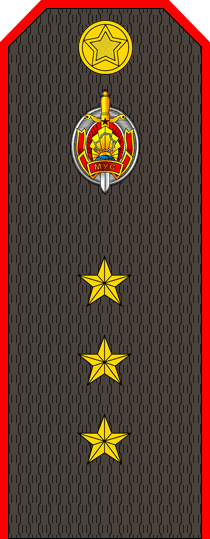
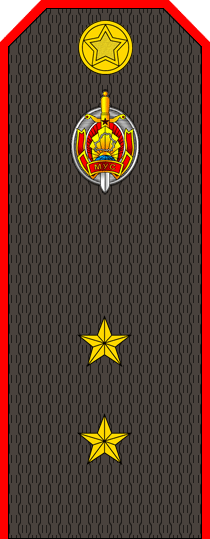
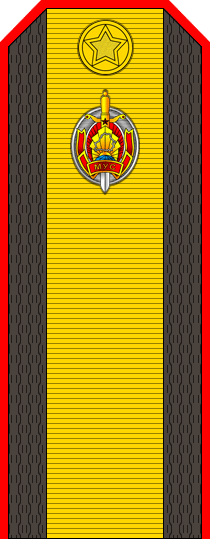
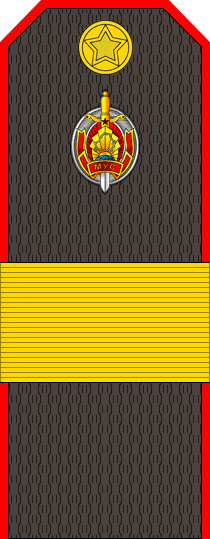
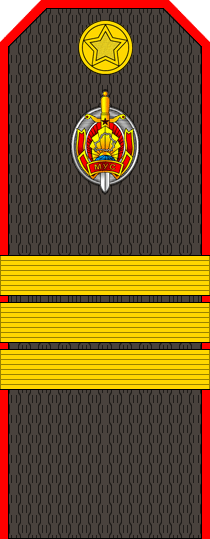
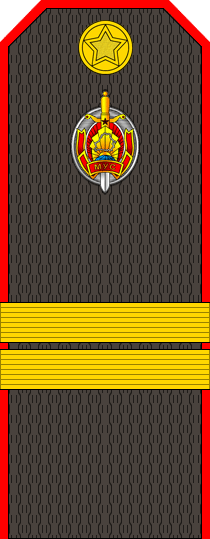
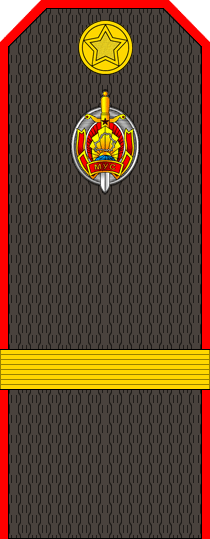
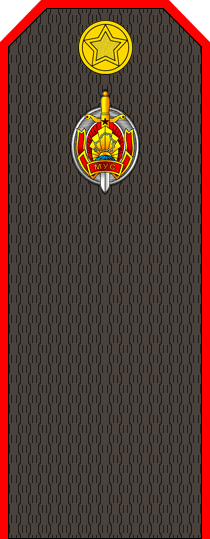
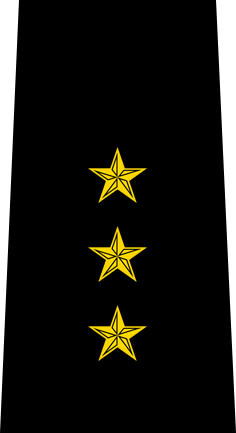
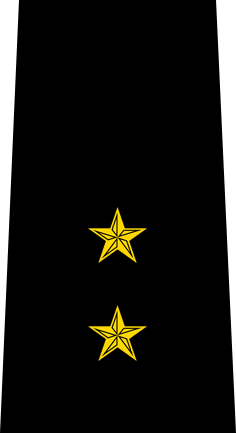
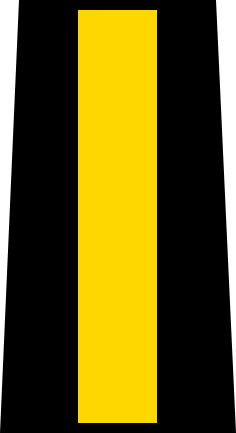
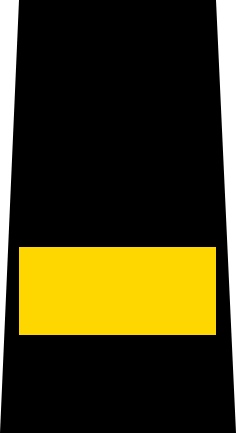
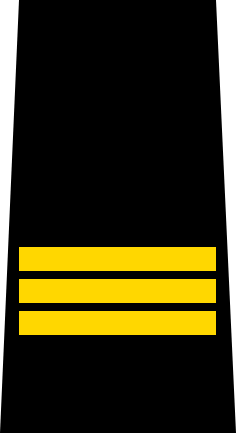
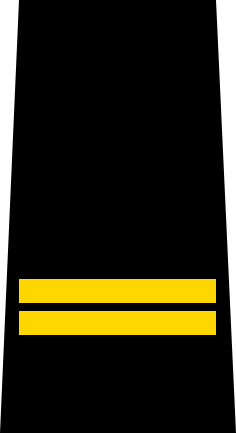
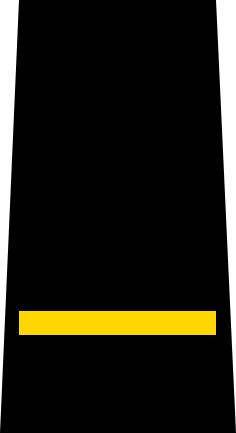
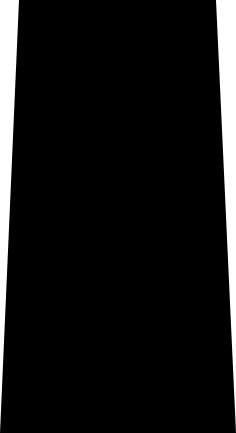
Rank group	Senior NCOs						Junior NCOs	Enlisted
Militsiya
Militsiya	Старшы прапаршчык Staršy praparščyk	Прапаршчык; Praparščyk	Старшына; Staršyna	Старшы сяржант Staršy siaržant	Сяржант; Siaržant	Малодшы сяржант Malodšy siaržant	Яфрэйтар; Jafrejtar	Радавы; Radavy

== Gallery ==
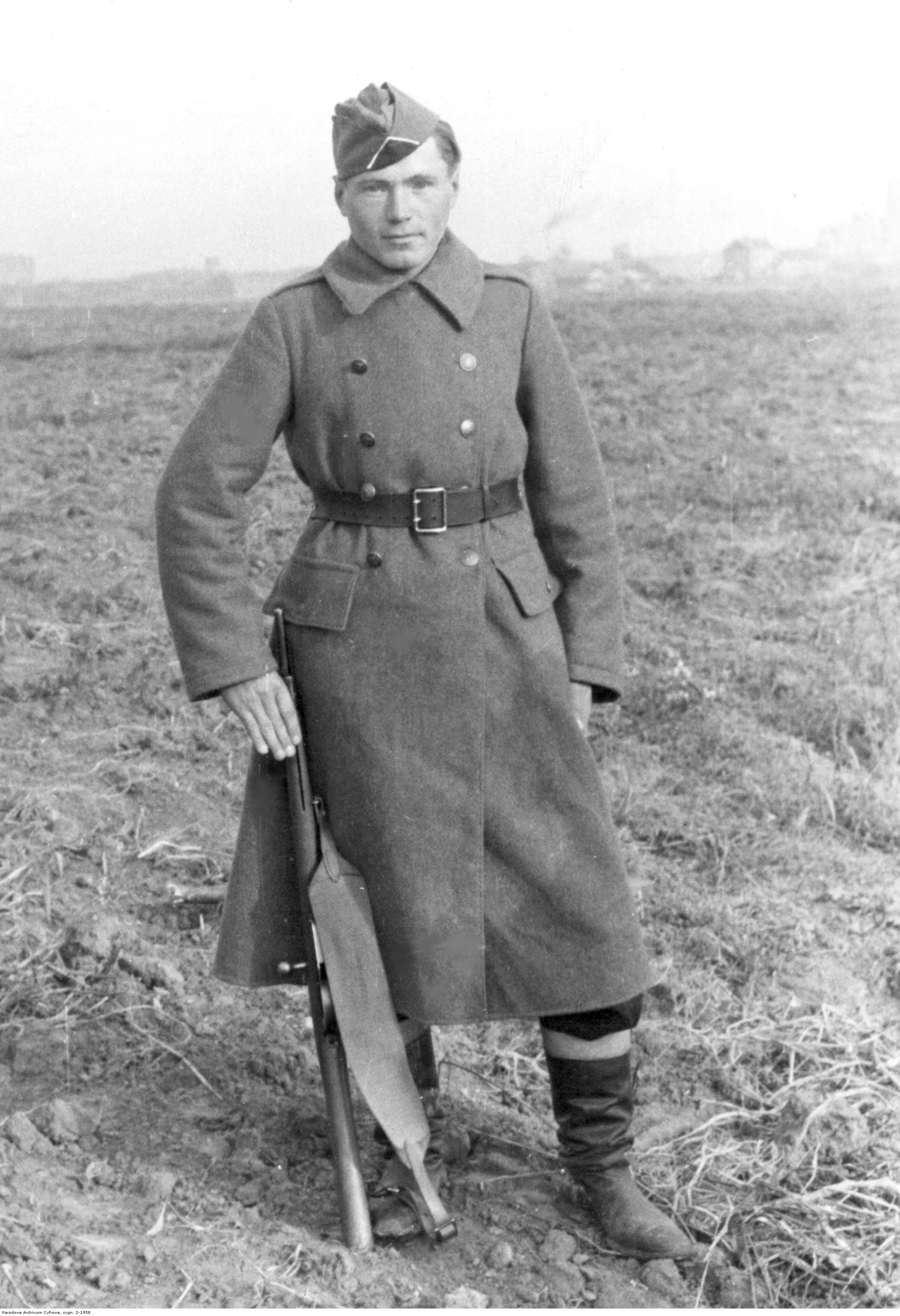
A Soviet-era Belarusian policeman in their regular uniform during the 1950s.

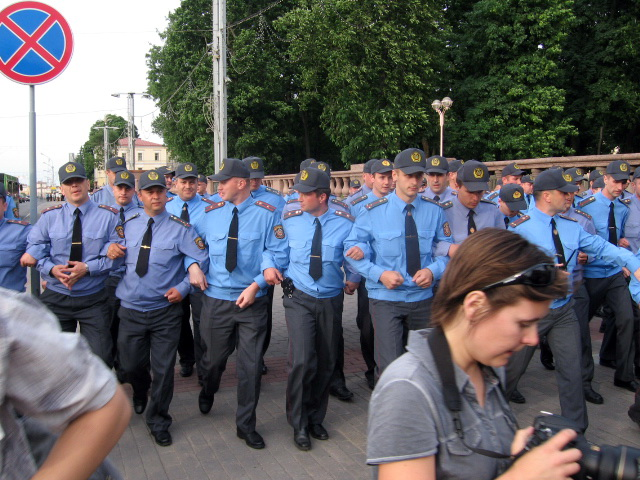
Policemen during civil unrest on October Square.

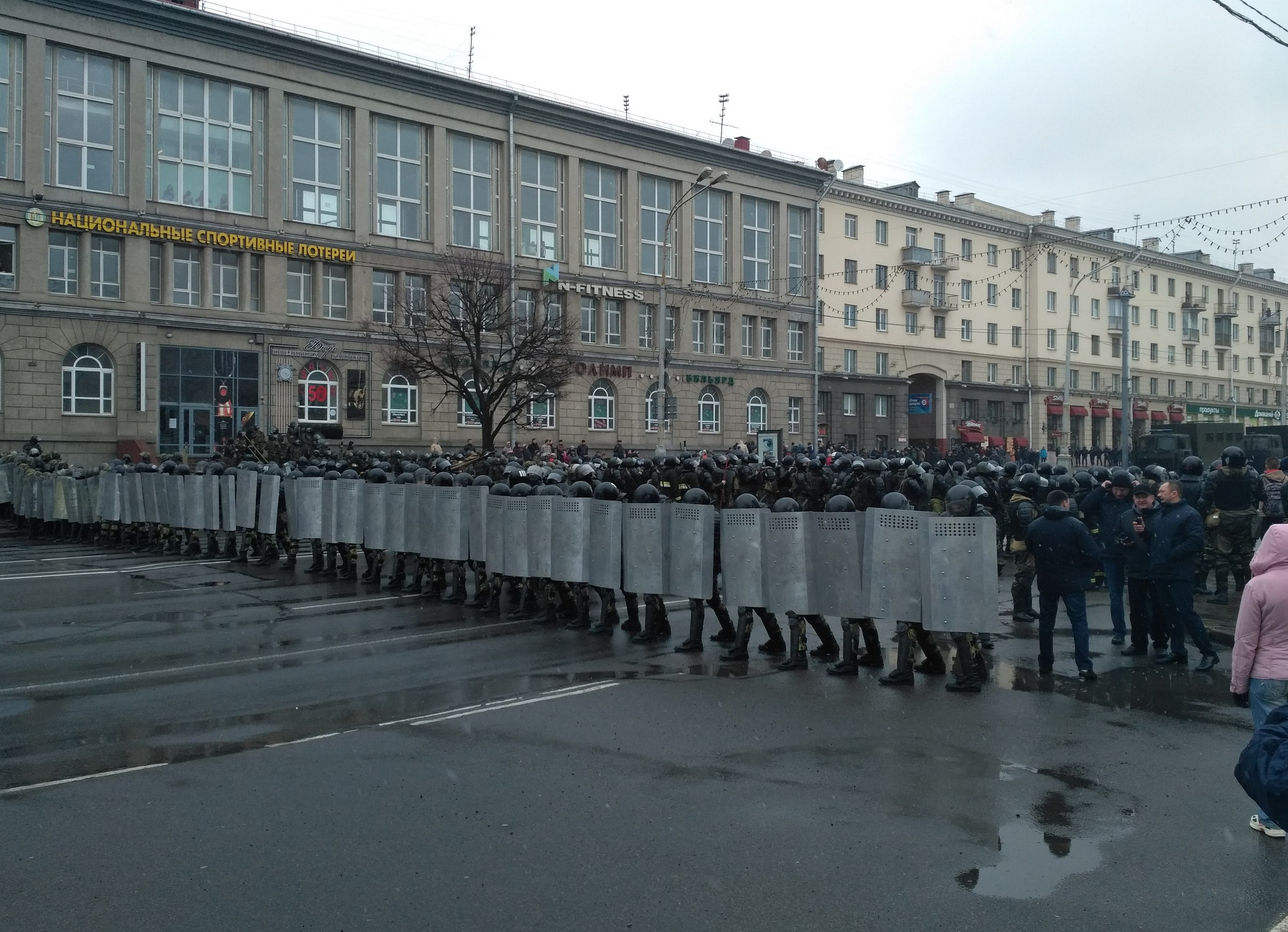
Belarusian riot police during a Freedom Day rally in March 2017.

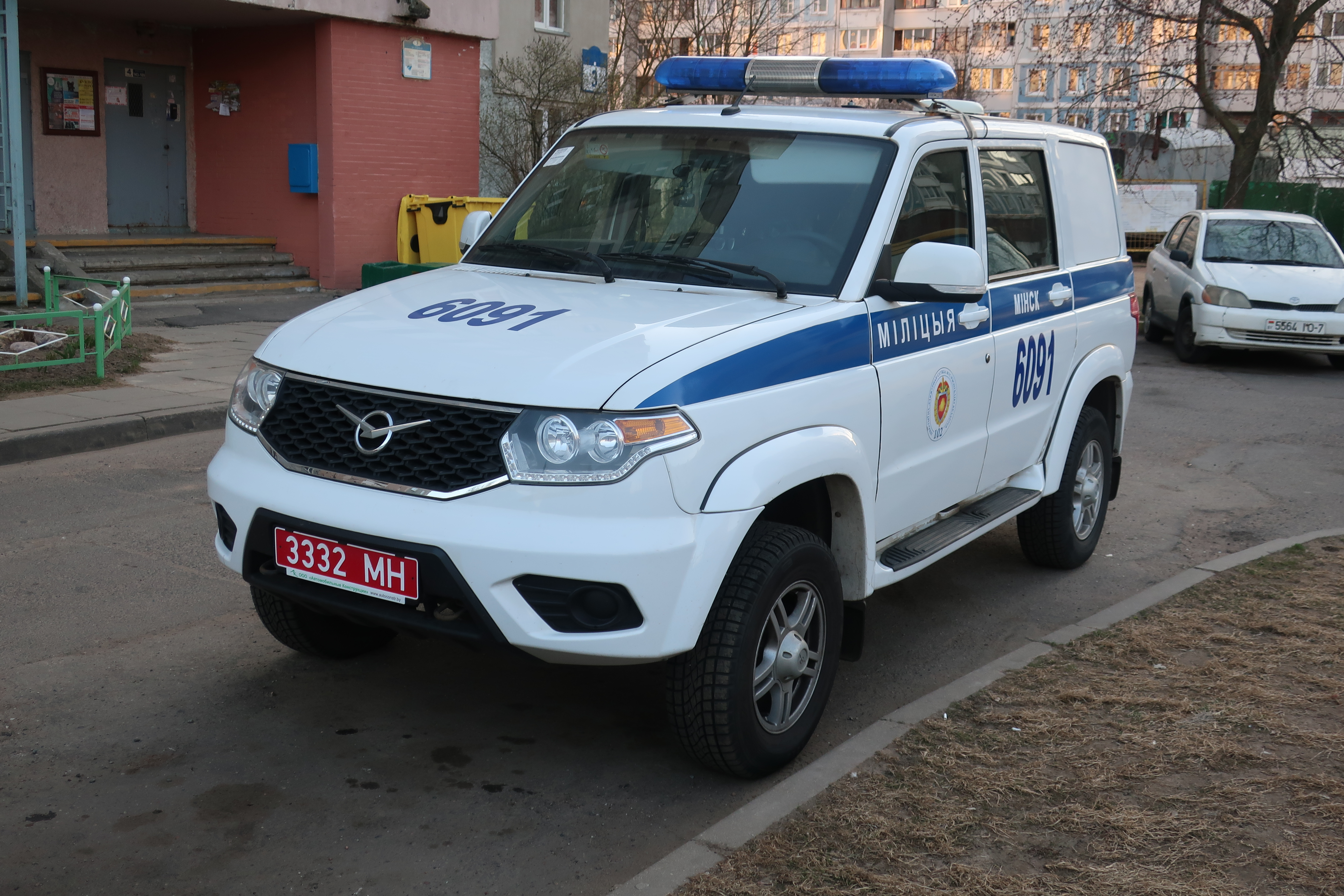
A specially designed UAZ Patriot police car with the Minsk City Police Department in April 2019.

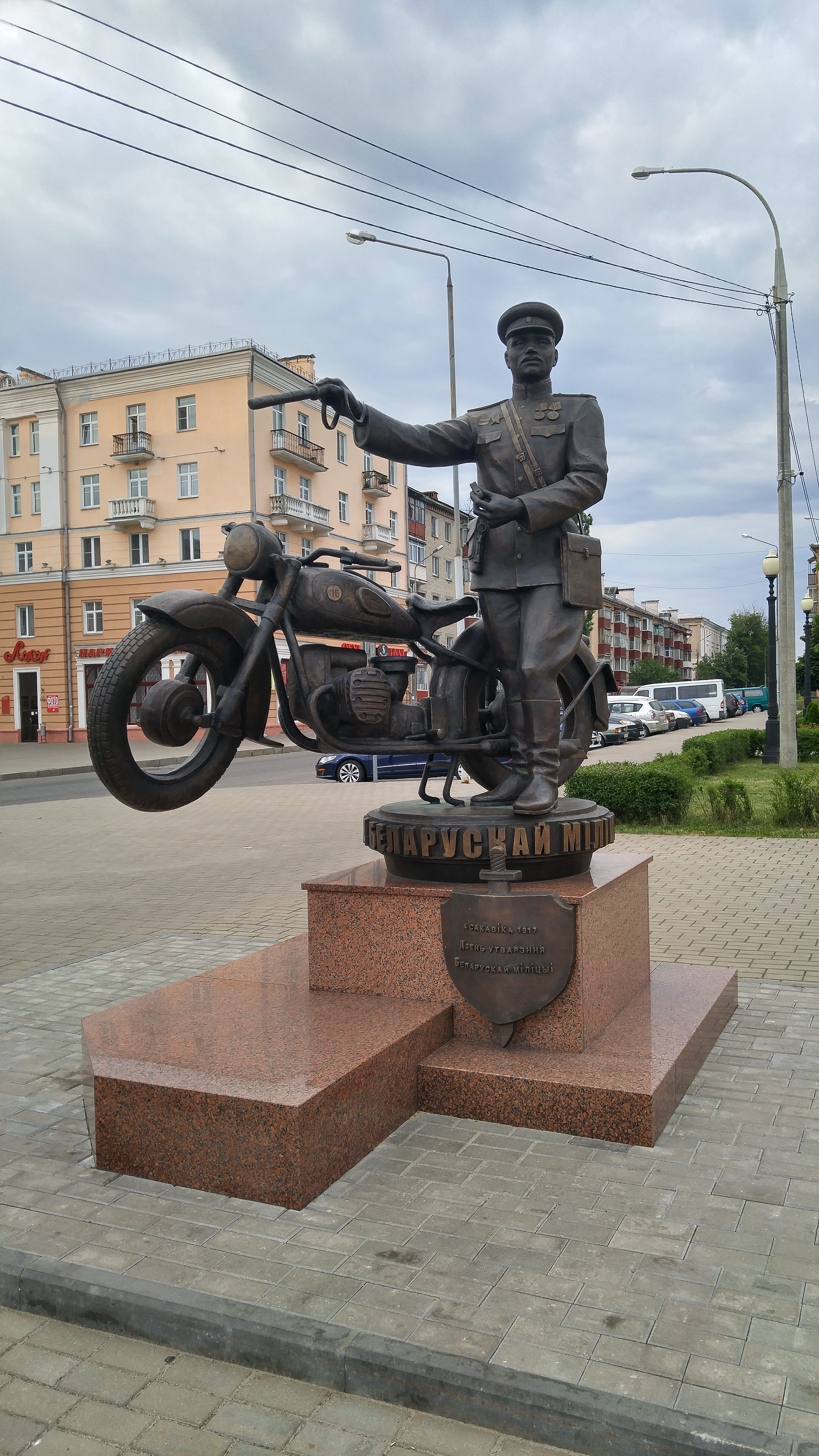
A monument in Gomel commemorating the centennial anniversary of the Belarusian police.

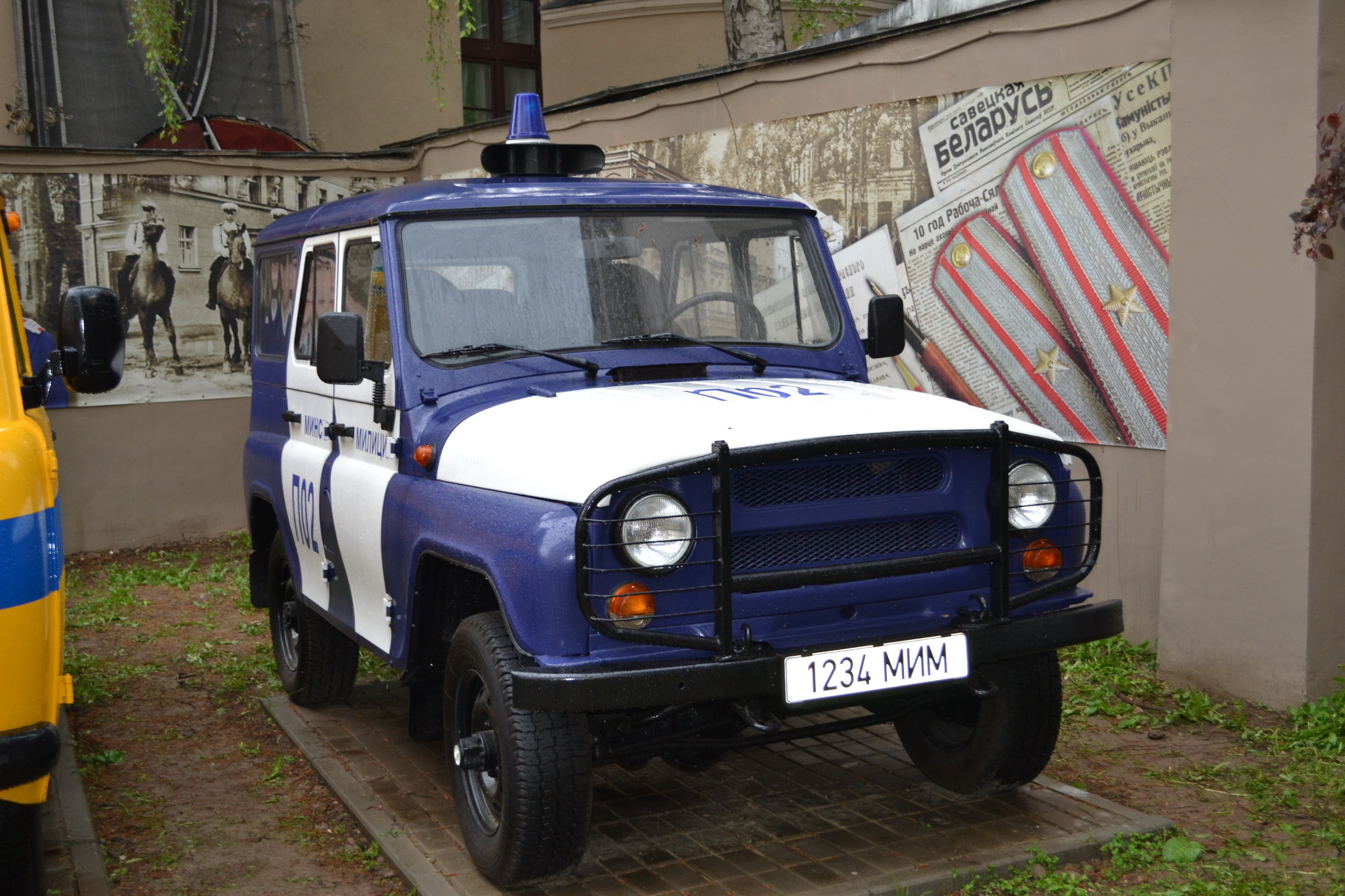
A Belarusian police car in the Museum of the Ministry of Internal Affairs.

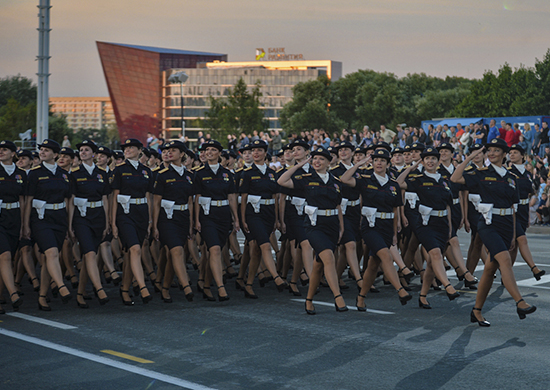
Belarusian policewomen.

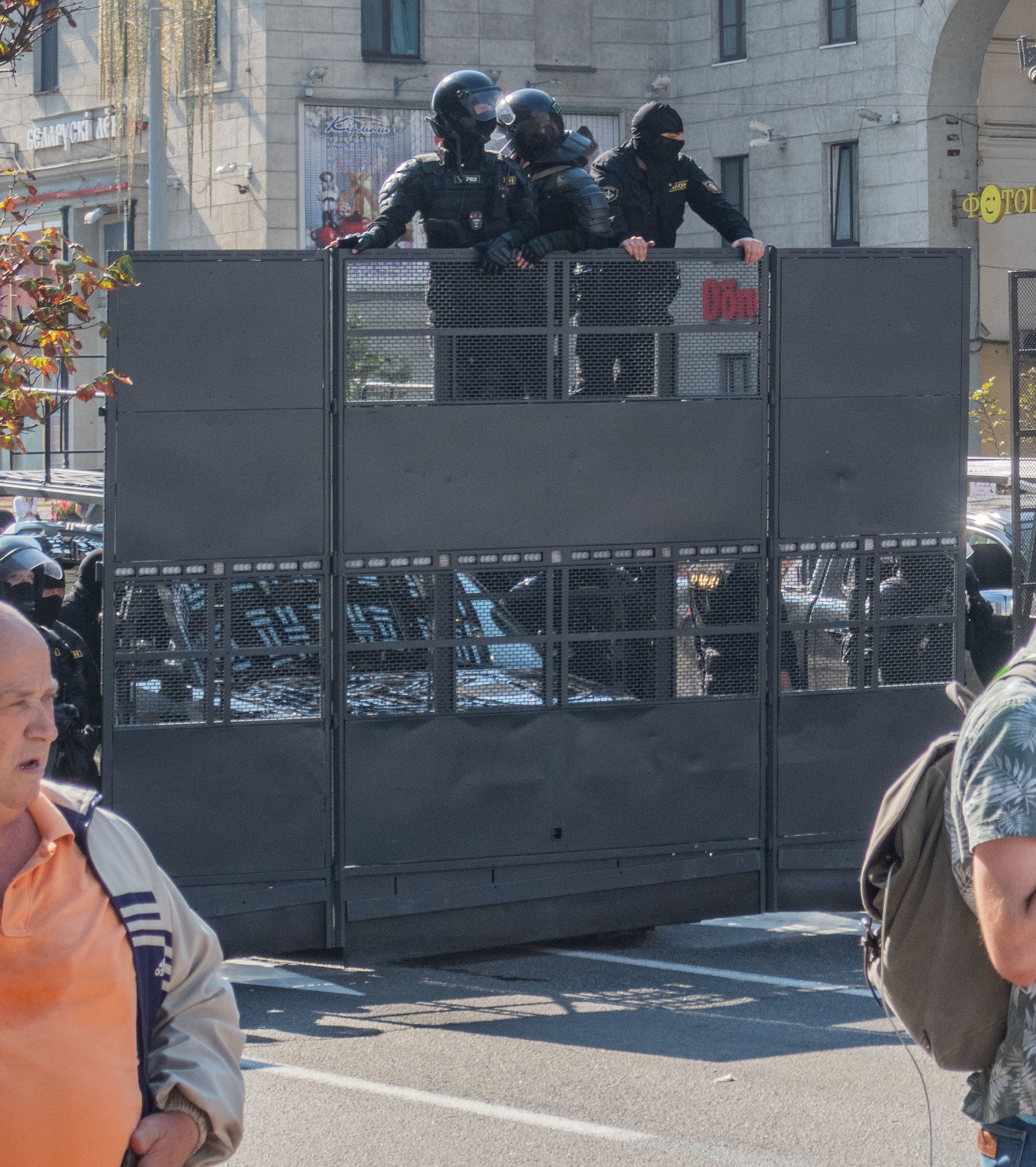
Rubezh special vehicle

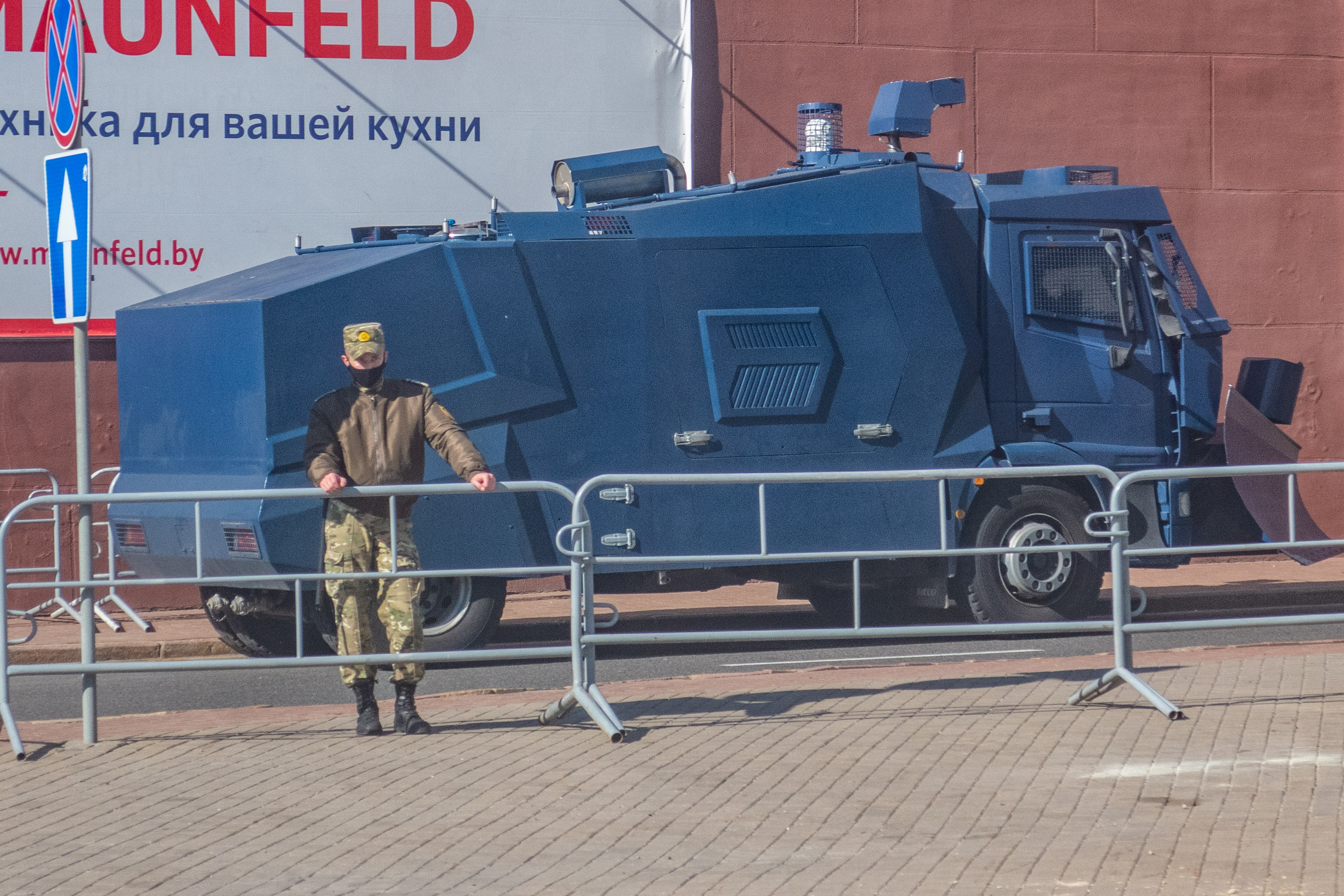
STREIT Predator water cannon

== See also ==
- Police of Russia
- National Police of Ukraine
