= Constitution Day (South Korea) =

National holiday on 17 July

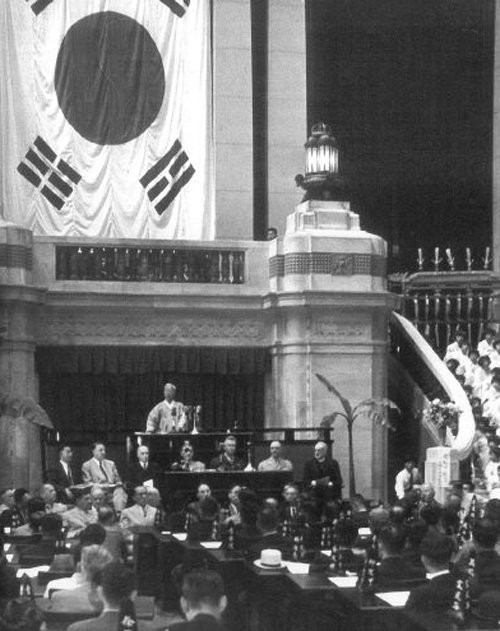
- Constituent National Assembly Opening Ceremony in 1948
- Official name: Constitution Day
- Observed by: South Koreans
- Type: National celebration day but not a public office holiday
- Significance: Marks the proclamation of the South Korean constitution
- Date: 17 July
- Next time: 17 July 2026
- Frequency: Annual

- Constitution Day
- Hangul: 제헌절
- Hanja: 制憲節
- RR: Jeheonjeol
- MR: Chehŏnjŏl
- IPA: [t͡ɕeɦʌɲd͡ʑʌɭ]

Constitution Day or Jeheonjeol (Korean: 제헌절) in South Korea is observed on 17 July, the day that the first South Korean constitution was proclaimed in 1948. The date was deliberately chosen to match the founding date of 17 July of the Joseon dynasty.

== Background ==
Although the Korean Peninsula was liberated from Japanese rule by the Allies after the end of World War II on 15 August 1945, it was caught in the middle of a Cold War power struggle between the Soviet Union and the United States. It took until 1948 for a democratic election for National Assembly members to be held in South Korea. The elected assembly members set upon creating a constitution, and decided upon a presidential and unicameral system. The constitution was formally adopted on 12 July 1948 and promulgated by South Korean President Syngman Rhee on 17 July 1948.

== History ==
Constitution Day was proclaimed to be a South Korean national holiday on 1 October 1949, with the creation of the National Holiday Law.

Between 2008 and 2025 inclusive, Constitution Day in South Korea was not celebrated as a no-work public holiday, following the restructure of laws regarding the public sector with a 40-hour work week. As a result, South Korea no longer had any official public holiday celebrating the nation of South Korea itself or its institutions. It remained, however, a national holiday for commemoration.

In 2026, officials declared the reinstatement of Constitution Day as a no-work public holiday from that year onwards.

== Activities ==
On Constitution Day in South Korea, a commemorative ceremony is held with the President, Chairman of the National Assembly, Chief Justice of the Supreme Court and the original constitutional assembly members in attendance, and citizens hang the national flag in commemoration. Special activities such as marathons are often held.

== See also ==
- Public holidays in South Korea
