= Public holidays in South Korea =

Public holidays in South Korea each belong to one or more of three categories:

- National day (Korean: 국경일; Hanja: 國慶日)
- National flag raising day (국기게양일; 國旗揭揚日)
- Public holiday (공휴일; 公休日): on these days, the general working population gets a day off, and employers are legally required to pay their employees.

Each category has a different legal basis. All national days are also flag-raising days.

== List of public holidays in South Korea ==
English name	Korean name	Transliteration	Date	Remarks	National celebration day	Flag raising	Day off
New Year's Day	신정	Sinjeong	January 1	The official name of the holiday means New Calendar New Year's Day	no	no	yes
Korean New Year	설날	Seollal	1st day of 1st lunar month	Also called Seol (설) or Gujeong (Korean: 구정; Hanja: 舊正). The first day of the Korean lunar calendar. It is one of the most important of the traditional Korean holidays, and is considered a more important holiday than the Gregorian New Year's Day.	no	no	yes (3 days)
Independence Movement Day	3ㆍ1절	Samiljeol	March 1	This day commemorates the March 1st Movement in 1919. On March 1 of this year, 33 Korean nationalists and students declared their nation's independence in Seoul. It started a nationwide civil protest and was a catalyst for the establishment of the Provisional Government of the Republic of Korea (April 13, 1919).	yes	yes	yes
Labor Day	노동절	Nodongjeol	May 1	The day on which given to the workers for their hard work and further boost their motivation. Formerly known as "Workers Day" (근로자의 날) from 1963 to 2025. The Day changed to "Labor Day" in 2025, and became a public holiday in 2026.	no	no	yes
Children's Day	어린이날	Eorininal	May 5	The day on which to esteem the personalities of children and plan for their happiness. In Korea, Children's Day started on May 1, 1922, when 8 people including Bang Jeong-hwan (방정환) declared the Day and held an anniversary. In 1946, the Day changed to May 5, and became a public holiday in 1975.	no	no	yes
Buddha's Birthday	부처님 오신 날	Bucheonnim Osinnal	8th day of 4th lunar month	Formerly called Seokgatansinil (Korean: 석가탄신일; Hanja: 釋迦誕辰日); also referred to as Sawol Chopail (Korean: 사월 초파일; Hanja: 四月初八日). The birthday of Gautama Buddha.	no	no	yes
Memorial Day	현충일	Hyeonchung-il	June 6	The day commemorates the men and women who died while in military service or in the independence movement. On this day, a national commemoration ceremony is held at the Seoul National Cemetery and Daejeon National Cemetery.	no	half mast	yes
Constitution Day	제헌절	Jeheonjeol	July 17	The day celebrates the promulgation of the Constitution of the Republic of Korea in 1948.	yes	yes	yes
Liberation Day	광복절	Gwangbokjeol	August 15	The day celebrates the national liberation from the Empire of Japan in 1945. On the same day in 1948, the government of the Republic of Korea was established. The word Gwangbok (Korean: 광복) means "restoration of light".	yes	yes	yes
Chuseok	추석	Chuseok	15th day of 8th lunar month	Also called Han-gawi (Korean: 한가위). Korean traditional harvest and Mid-Autumn Festival. With Korean New Year, it is one of the most important Korean traditional holidays. As a celebration of the good harvest, Koreans visit their ancestral hometowns and feast on traditional food.	no	no	yes (3 days)
National Foundation Day	개천절	Gaecheonjeol	October 3	The day celebrates the foundation of Gojoseon, the first state of the Korean nation. According to the Samguk Yusa, Dangun founded Gojoseon on the 3rd day of 10th lunar month, 2333 BC. Today, South Koreans celebrate their national foundation on October 3 according to the Gregorian calendar, for convenience sake. Gaecheonjeol means "Heaven-opened Day".	yes	yes	yes
Hangul Day	한글날	Hangeullal	October 9	The day commemorates the invention (1443) and the proclamation (1446) of hangul, the native alphabet of the Korean language. King Sejong the Great, inventor of hangul, is one of the most honored rulers in Korean history.	yes	yes	yes
Christmas	크리스마스/성탄절	Keuriseumaseu/Seongtanjeol	December 25	Commonly called Seongtanjeol (Korean: 성탄절; Hanja: 聖誕節), especially among Korean Christians.	no	no	yes
Election days for elections on the termination of terms of office referred to in Article 34 of the Public Official Election Act	「공직선거법」 제34조에 따른 임기만료에 의한 선거의 선거일	Gongjikseongeobeop jesamsipsajoe ttareun imgimanryoe uihan seongeoeui seongeoil	Not fixed, but always on a Wednesday.	See Elections in South Korea. It is commonly called Seongeoil (Korean: 선거일) or Seongeonal (Korean: 선거날) (Election Day), in short. The date of this holiday is limited to regular presidential election day, legislative election day, and local election day (excluding early voting day, by-election day, referendum day or unscheduled election day caused by things like impeachment).	no	no	yes

== National celebration days ==
These days celebrate events considered joyous to Korea. In the beginning, Independence Declaration Day (March 1) was first stipulated in 1946. After the establishment of the Government of the Republic of Korea in 1948, four major National Celebration Days (Independence Declaration Day, Constitution Day, Liberation Day, National Foundation Day) were provided by "The Law Concerning the National Celebration Days" (국경일에관한법률) in 1949. In 2005, Hangul Day became the 5th National Celebration day.

== National flag raising days ==
All the National Celebration Days, Memorial Day (half staff), Armed Forces Day are provided by Article 8 of the "National Flag Law" (대한민국국기법 제8조). On these days, the raising of the taegukgi at every house and along every roadside is promoted.

== Public days off ==
They are provided by the "Regulations on Holidays of Public Agencies" (관공서의 공휴일에 관한 규정) This Regulation originally applied only to government and public offices, but most individual business offices also follow it.

== Dates in solar calendar of Lunar New Year's Day, Buddha's Birthday, and Chuseok ==
Year	Lunar New Year's Day	Buddha's Birthday	Chuseok
1994	February 10 (Thu)	May 18 (Wed)	September 20 (Tue)
1995	January 31 (Tue)	May 7 (Sun)	September 9 (Sat)
1996	February 19 (Mon)	May 24 (Fri)	September 27 (Fri)
1997	February 8 (Sat)	May 14 (Wed)	September 16 (Tue)
1998	January 28 (Wed)	May 3 (Sun)	October 5 (Mon)
1999	February 16 (Tue)	May 22 (Sat)	September 24 (Fri)
2000	February 5 (Sat)	May 11 (Thu)	September 12 (Tue)
2001	January 24 (Wed)	May 1 (Tue)	October 1 (Mon)
2002	February 12 (Tue)	May 19 (Sun)	September 21 (Sat)
2003	February 1 (Sat)	May 8 (Thu)	September 11 (Thu)
2004	January 22 (Thu)	May 26 (Wed)	September 28 (Tue)
2005	February 9 (Wed)	May 15 (Sun)	September 18 (Sun)
2006	January 29 (Sun)	May 5 (Fri)	October 6 (Fri)
2007	February 18 (Sun)	May 24 (Thu)	September 25 (Tue)
2008	February 7 (Thu)	May 12 (Mon)	September 14 (Sun)
2009	January 26 (Mon)	May 2 (Sat)	October 3 (Sat)
2010	February 14 (Sun)	May 21 (Fri)	September 22 (Wed)
2011	February 3 (Thu)	May 10 (Tue)	September 12 (Mon)
2012	January 23 (Mon)	May 28 (Mon)	September 30 (Sun)
2013	February 10 (Sun)	May 17 (Fri)	September 19 (Thu)
2014	January 31 (Fri)	May 6 (Tue)	September 8 (Mon)
2015	February 19 (Thu)	May 25 (Mon)	September 27 (Sun)
2016	February 8 (Mon)	May 14 (Sat)	September 15 (Thu)
2017	January 28 (Sat)	May 3 (Wed)	October 4 (Wed)
2018	February 16 (Fri)	May 22 (Tue)	September 24 (Mon)
2019	February 5 (Tue)	May 12 (Sun)	September 13 (Fri)
2020	January 25 (Sat)	April 30 (Thu)	October 1 (Thu)
2021	February 12 (Fri)	May 19 (Wed)	September 21 (Tue)
2022	February 1 (Tue)	May 8 (Sun)	September 10 (Sat)
2023	January 22 (Sun)	May 27 (Sat)	September 29 (Fri)
2024	February 10 (Sat)	May 15 (Wed)	September 17 (Tue)
2025	January 29 (Wed)	May 5 (Mon)	October 6 (Mon)
2026	February 17 (Tue)	May 24 (Sun)	September 25 (Fri)
2027	February 7 (Sun)	May 13 (Thu)	September 15 (Wed)
2028	January 27 (Thu)	May 2 (Tue)	October 3 (Tue)
2029	February 13 (Tue)	May 20 (Sun)	September 22 (Sat)
2030	February 3 (Sun)	May 9 (Thu)	September 12 (Thu)
2031	January 23 (Thu)	May 28 (Wed)	October 1 (Wed)
2032	February 11 (Wed)	May 16 (Sun)	September 19 (Sun)
2033	January 31 (Mon)	May 6 (Fri)	September 8 (Thu)
2034	February 19 (Sun)	May 25 (Thu)	September 27 (Wed)
2035	February 8 (Thu)	May 15 (Tue)	September 16 (Sun)
2036	January 28 (Mon)	May 3 (Sat)	October 4 (Sat)
2037	February 15 (Sun)	May 22 (Fri)	September 24 (Thu)
2038	February 4 (Thu)	May 11 (Tue)	September 13 (Mon)
2039	January 24 (Mon)	April 30 (Sat)	October 2 (Sun)
2040	February 12 (Sun)	May 18 (Fri)	September 21 (Fri)
2041	February 1 (Fri)	May 7 (Tue)	September 10 (Tue)
2042	January 22 (Wed)	May 26 (Mon)	September 28 (Sun)
2043	February 10 (Tue)	May 16 (Sat)	September 17 (Thu)
2044	January 30 (Sat)	May 5 (Thu)	October 5 (Wed)
2045	February 17 (Fri)	May 24 (Wed)	September 25 (Mon)
2046	February 6 (Tue)	May 13 (Sun)	September 15 (Sat)
2047	January 26 (Sat)	May 2 (Thu)	October 4 (Fri)
2048	February 14 (Fri)	May 20 (Wed)	September 22 (Tue)
2049	February 2 (Tue)	May 9 (Sun)	September 11 (Sat)
2050	January 23 (Sun)	May 28 (Sat)	September 30 (Fri)

== See also ==
- Festivals of Korea
- Korean calendar
- Lunar Month
- Public holidays in North Korea
- Working hours in South Korea

General:

- Culture of Korea
  - Culture of South Korea
  - Culture of North Korea
