= Day of the Police of Belarus =

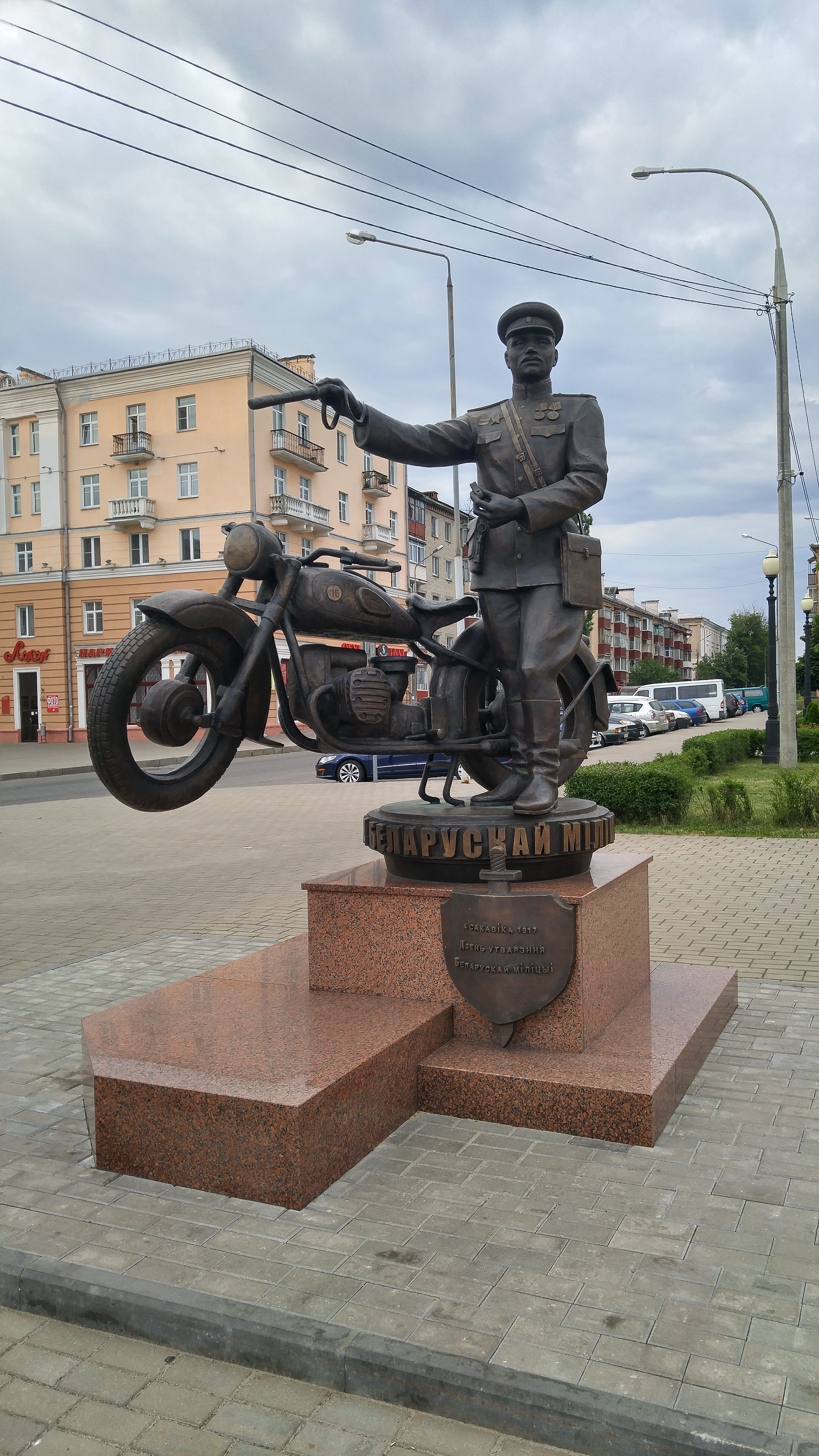
A monument commemorating the centennial anniversary of the Belarusian police.

The Day of the Police of Belarus (Belarusian: Дзень паліцыі Беларусі, Dzień palicyi Bielarusi; Russian: День белорусской милиции, Dyen byelorusskoy militsii) is a professional holiday of the Belarusian police (Militsiya). On 4 March 1917, Bolshevik politician and icon Mikhail Frunze was appointed the chief of the militia of the city of Minsk. This date is considered to be the birthday of the Belarusian police. The holiday was officially approved by decree of the President of Belarus Alexander Lukashenko on 26 March 1998.

== Traditions and events ==
During the holiday, unit commanders as well as MVD leaders congratulate their subordinates on the holiday, with individual a presentations of awards, certificates, and medals to high performing employees. The Museum of the MVD is open on this date and gives special tours to tourists and employees. Police officers have also on occasion been given tours of state institutions such as Independence Palace and Government House. Special reports and documentary films are also shown on television stations such as Belarus 24 and Belsat TV. The 100th anniversary of the Belarusian police was celebrated with a parade of the Militsiya and the Internal Troops on Minsk's October Square. In Grodno, the local police traditionally celebrate the holiday by marching along the Neman river.

== See also ==
- Law enforcement in Belarus
- Militsiya
- Public holidays in Belarus
